= Index of prostitution-by-area articles =

This is a list of prostitution-by-area articles

== A ==
- Prostitution in Afghanistan
- Prostitution in Africa
- Prostitution in Albania
- Prostitution in Algeria
- Prostitution in American Samoa
- Prostitution in the Americas
- Prostitution in ancient Greece
- Prostitution in ancient Rome
- Prostitution in Angola
- Prostitution in Antigua and Barbuda
- Prostitution in Argentina
- Prostitution in Armenia
- Prostitution in Asia
- Prostitution in Australia
- Prostitution in Austria
- Prostitution in Azerbaijan

== B ==
- Prostitution in the Bahamas
- Prostitution in Bahrain
- Prostitution in Bangladesh
- Prostitution in Barbados
- Prostitution in Belarus
- Prostitution in Belgium
- Prostitution in Belize
- Prostitution in Benin
- Prostitution in Bhutan
- Prostitution in Bolivia
- Prostitution in Botswana
- Prostitution in Brazil
- Prostitution in the British Overseas Territories
- Prostitution in Brunei
- Prostitution in Bulgaria
- Prostitution in Burkina Faso
- Prostitution in Burundi

== C ==
- Prostitution in California
- Prostitution in Cambodia
- Prostitution in Cameroon
- Prostitution in Canada
  - History of prostitution in Canada
- Prostitution in Cape Verde
- Prostitution in the Central African Republic
- Prostitution in Chad
- Prostitution in Chile
- Prostitution in China
  - Prostitution in Hong Kong
  - Prostitution in Macau
  - Prostitution in Taiwan
  - Prostitution in Tibet
- Prostitution in Colombia
- Prostitution in colonial India
- Prostitution in the Democratic Republic of the Congo
- Prostitution in Costa Rica
- Prostitution in Croatia
- Prostitution in the Crown dependencies
- Prostitution in Cuba
- Prostitution in Cyprus
- Prostitution in the Czech Republic

== D ==
- Prostitution in Denmark
- Prostitution in the Democratic Republic of the Congo
- Prostitution in Djibouti
- Prostitution in the Dominican Republic
- Prostitution in the Dutch Caribbean

== E ==
- Prostitution in Ecuador
- Prostitution in Egypt
- Prostitution in El Salvador
- Prostitution in Eritrea
- Prostitution in Estonia
- Prostitution in Ethiopia
- Prostitution in Eswatini
- Prostitution in Europe

== F ==
- Prostitution in Fiji
- Prostitution in Finland
- Prostitution in France
  - Prostitution in Overseas France
  - Prostitution in Paris

== G ==
- Prostitution in the Gambia
- Prostitution in Georgia (country)
- Prostitution in Germany
  - Prostitution in the German Democratic Republic
- Prostitution in Ghana
- Prostitution in Greece
  - Prostitution in ancient Greece
- Prostitution in Guam
- Prostitution in Guatemala
- Prostitution in Guinea-Bissau
- Prostitution in Guyana

== H ==
- Prostitution in Haiti
- Prostitution in Harlem Renaissance
- Prostitution in Hawaii
- Prostitution in Honduras
- Prostitution in Hong Kong
- Prostitution in Hungary

== I ==
- Prostitution in Iceland
- Prostitution in India
  - Prostitution in colonial India
  - Prostitution in Kolkata
  - Prostitution in Mumbai
- Prostitution in Indonesia
- Prostitution in Iran
- Prostitution in Iraq
- Prostitution in the Republic of Ireland
- Prostitution in Israel
- Prostitution in Ivory Coast
- Prostitution in Italy
  - Prostitution in ancient Rome

== J ==
- Prostitution in Jamaica
- Prostitution in Japan
- Prostitution in Jordan

== K ==
- Prostitution in Kazakhstan
- Prostitution in Kenya
- Prostitution in Kolkata
- Prostitution in North Korea
- Prostitution in South Korea
- Prostitution in Kosovo

== L ==
- Prostitution in Laos
- Prostitution in Latvia
- Prostitution in Lebanon
- Prostitution in Libya
- Prostitution in Lithuania
- Prostitution in Luxembourg

== M ==
- Prostitution in Macau
- Prostitution in the Republic of Macedonia
- Prostitution in Madagascar
- Prostitution in Malawi
- Prostitution in Malaysia
- Prostitution in the Maldives
- Prostitution in Mali
- Prostitution in Malta
- Prostitution in Mexico
- Prostitution in Moldova
- Prostitution in Monaco
- Prostitution in Mongolia
- Prostitution in Morocco
- Prostitution in Mozambique
- Prostitution in Mumbai
- Prostitution in Myanmar

== N ==
- Prostitution in Namibia
- Prostitution in Nepal
- Prostitution in Nevada
- Prostitution in the Netherlands
  - Prostitution in the Dutch Caribbean
- Prostitution in New Zealand
- Prostitution in Nicaragua
- Prostitution in Niger
- Prostitution in Nigeria
- Prostitution in North Korea
- Prostitution in Northern Ireland
- Prostitution in Norway

== O ==
- Prostitution in Oceania
- Prostitution in Oman
- Prostitution in Overseas France

== P ==
- Prostitution in Pakistan
- Prostitution in the State of Palestine
- Prostitution in Panama
- Prostitution in Papua New Guinea
- Prostitution in Paraguay
- Prostitution in Paris
- Prostitution in Peru
- Prostitution in the Philippines
- Prostitution in Poland
- Prostitution in Portugal

== Q ==
- Prostitution in Qatar

== R ==
- Prostitution in the Republic of Ireland
- Prostitution in the Republic of Macedonia
- Prostitution in Rhode Island
- Prostitution in Romania
- Prostitution in Russia
  - Prostitution in the Soviet Union
- Prostitution in Rwanda

== S ==
- Prostitution in Samoa
- Prostitution in Saudi Arabia
- Prostitution in Scotland
- Prostitution in Senegal
- Prostitution in Sierra Leone
- Prostitution in Singapore
- Prostitution in the Solomon Islands
- Prostitution in Somalia
- Prostitution in South Africa
- Prostitution in South Korea
- Prostitution in South Sudan
- Prostitution in the Soviet Union
- Prostitution in Spain
  - Prostitution in Francoist Spain
  - Prostitution in the Spanish Civil War
- Prostitution in Sri Lanka
- Prostitution in the State of Palestine
- Prostitution in Suriname
- Prostitution in Sweden
- Prostitution in Switzerland
- Prostitution in Syria

== T ==
- Prostitution in Taiwan
- Prostitution in Tajikistan
- Prostitution in Tanzania
- Prostitution in Thailand
  - Child prostitution in Thailand
- Prostitution in Tibet
- Prostitution in Timor-Leste
- Prostitution in Togo
- Prostitution in Trinidad and Tobago
- Prostitution in Tunisia
- Prostitution in Turkey
- Prostitution in Turkmenistan

== U ==
- Prostitution in Uganda
- Prostitution in Ukraine
- Prostitution in the United Arab Emirates
- Prostitution in the United Kingdom
  - Prostitution in the British Overseas Territories
  - Prostitution in the Crown dependencies
  - Prostitution in Northern Ireland
  - Prostitution in Scotland
- Prostitution in the United States
  - Prostitution in California
  - Prostitution in Harlem Renaissance
  - Prostitution in Hawaii
  - Prostitution in Nevada
  - Prostitution in Rhode Island
- Prostitution in Uruguay
- Prostitution in Uzbekistan

== V ==
- Prostitution in Venezuela
- Prostitution in Vietnam

== Y ==
- Prostitution in Yemen

== Z ==
- Prostitution in Zambia
- Prostitution in Zimbabwe
