= Prostitution in Korea =

Prostitution in Korea can refer to:

- Prostitution in North Korea
- Prostitution in South Korea
