= Prostitution in North Macedonia =

Prostitution in North Macedonia is legal, though with various restrictions, and common. UNAIDS estimate there are 3588 prostitutes in the country. The government of North Macedonia is trying to clamp down on prostitution.

STAR-STAR (Association for support of marginalised workers) is a sex worker led support group. Its Executive Board is exclusively made up of sex workers. STAR-STAR was the first sex workers collective in the Balkans.

The country is a major transit point for prostitution to the west. The trafficking of women for sex is worth billions in North Macedonia and is considered to be run primarily by Albanian gangsters. The reputed 'kingpin' of sex trafficking, Dilaver Bojku, was murdered by a close range gunshot to the head in August 2017.

== Legal situation ==
Activities related to prostitution are prohibited in North Macedonia by both the Law on Misdemeanours Against the Public Order and Peace and the Criminal Law 1996.

Soliciting in a public place is prohibited by article 19 of the Law on Misdemeanours. The article also prohibits providing space for an act of prostitution. As restaurants, bars and hotels are defined as public places, owners of such places can be fined if prostitution occurs on the premises. Sex in public is also prohibited.

Article 191 of the Criminal Law prohibits third party involvement, such as procuring, pimping and profiting from the prostitution of others.

Law enforcement is corrupt, and often violent towards sex workers. In a 2007 study reported 82.4% of sex workers had been assaulted by the police.

== Sex trafficking ==
North Macedonia is a source, transit, and destination country for women and children subjected to sex trafficking. Women and girls in North Macedonia are subjected to sex trafficking within the country in restaurants, bars, and nightclubs. Foreign victims subjected to sex trafficking in North Macedonia typically originate from Eastern Europe, particularly Albania, Bosnia and Herzegovina, Kosovo, Romania, Serbia, and Ukraine. Citizens of North Macedonia and foreign victims transiting North Macedonia are subjected to sex trafficking in Southern, Central, and Western Europe. Migrants and refugees, particularly women and unaccompanied minors, travelling or being smuggled through North Macedonia are vulnerable to trafficking. Students are vulnerable to false employment promises in other European countries. Traffickers frequently bribe police and labour inspectors. Police have been investigated and convicted for complicity in human trafficking.

Articles 418(a) and (d) of the criminal code prohibit all forms of trafficking and prescribe a minimum penalty of four years imprisonment for trafficking adults and 12 years imprisonment for trafficking children. In December 2015, the government deleted article 191(a) on child prostitution, which had allowed the prosecution of child sex traffickers for a lesser offence, and amended article 418(d). The government investigated one sex trafficking case involving six suspects for sex and labour trafficking of children, compared to zero investigations in 2015.

The United States Department of State Office to Monitor and Combat Trafficking in Persons ranks North Macedonia as a 'Tier 2' country.
