= Prostitution in Burundi =

Prostitution in Burundi is illegal but is commonplace and on the rise. Prostitution is prevalent in all areas of the country, and especially in the largest city (and former capital), Bujumbura, and prior to the security crisis in 2015, the tourist areas around Lake Tanganyika. UNAIDS estimate there are 51,000 prostitutes in Burundi. Many women have turned to prostitution due to poverty. Previously law enforcement made little effort to curb prostitution. Political pressures, including from the mayor of Bujumbura, Freddy Mbonimpa, have led to crackdowns all over the country.

HIV, sex trafficking and child prostitution are problems in the country.

== HIV ==
As with other sub-Saharan African countries, HIV is a problem in Burundi. Sex workers are one of the high risk groups. The Burundi Second Multisectoral HIV/AIDS Project, funded by the World Bank, ran from 2008 to 2011 and worked to increase availability and use of preventive services to high risk groups. HIV prevalence rates amongst sex workers has fallen from 38% in 2007 to 21% in 2016.

== Sex trafficking ==
Burundi is a source country for children and possibly women subjected to sex trafficking. Due to a complex political, economic, and security crisis in 2015, Burundi's fragile economic and security environment created an opportunity for criminals, including traffickers, to take advantage of Burundians in precarious or desperate situations. There is little official data available on abuses committed against Burundi's approximately 60,000 IDPs, 60 percent of whom are younger than age 18 and are highly vulnerable to exploitation. Between April and December 2015, approximately 70,000 Burundians refugees fled to Rwanda, which contributed to an increase in child sex trafficking of both male and female refugees in Rwanda. Burundian refugee girls residing in Rwanda's Kigeme refugee camp were reportedly exploited in sex trafficking in nearby towns.

Traffickers allegedly include victims’ relatives, neighbours, and friends, who recruit them under false pretences to exploit them in forced labor and sex trafficking. Children are fraudulently recruited from rural areas for domestic work and later exploited in sex trafficking, including in Bujumbura. Women offer vulnerable girls room and board within their homes, eventually pushing some into prostitution to pay for living expenses. These brothels are located in poorer areas of Bujumbura, along the lake, on trucking routes, and in other urban centers such as Ngozi, Gitega, and Rumonge. Some orphaned girls are exploited in sex trafficking, with boys acting as their facilitators, to pay for school, food, and shelter. Incarcerated women facilitate commercial sex between male prisoners and detained children within the Burundian prison system. Men from East Africa and the Middle East, as well as Burundian government employees including teachers, police officers and gendarmes, military, and prison officials, are among the clients of Burundian girls in child sex trafficking. Business people recruit Burundian girls for exploitation in sex trafficking in Bujumbura, as well as in Rwanda, Kenya, Uganda, and the Middle East. In 2015, Rwandan officials and international and local NGOs reported that Burundian refugee girls were exploited in sex trafficking in Uganda after transiting Rwanda.

The United States Department of State Office to Monitor and Combat Trafficking in Persons ranks Burundi as a 'Tier 2' country.
