= Prostitution in Timor-Leste =

Prostitution in Timor-Leste (formerly East Timor) is legal, but soliciting and third party involvement for profit or to facilitate prostitution is forbidden. Prostitution has become a problem since the country gained independence from Indonesia in 2002, especially in the capital, Dili. There are estimated to be 1,688 sex workers in the country.

Law enforcement is weak, but there are occasional clampdowns. Foreign sex workers are usually targeted, and are often deported. Public order laws are also used against prostitutes.

Many of the local prostitutes have entered the sex trade due to poverty and lack of other employment. Foreign prostitutes, especially from Indonesia, China and the Philippines, enter the country on 90-day tourists visas.

Sex trafficking and Child prostitution are problems in the country.

== UN peacekeeping force ==
Prior to its departure in 2012, the UN peacekeeping force's UNPOL division assisted the police, including taking part in prostitution raids. However, despite a zero-tolerance policy towards UN personnel using prostitutes, the UN personnel were also a large client group of the prostitutes. It was alleged they frequented brothels, including those using trafficked women. UN vehicles were used to pick up street prostitutes.

There were also allegations that a ship chartered by the UN was being used to traffic children for prostitution in the country.

== Sex trafficking ==
Timor-Leste is a source and destination country for women, and children subjected to sex trafficking. Timorese women, girls, and occasionally young men and boys from rural areas are led to the capital with the promise of better employment or education prospects and are subjected to sex trafficking; there are reports of official complicity in these practices. Foreign women, including those from Cambodia, China, Indonesia, the Philippines, and Vietnam, are vulnerable to sex trafficking in Timor-Leste. Transnational traffickers may be members of Indonesian or Chinese organised crime syndicates, and they appear to rotate foreign victims of sex trafficking in and out of the country for the length of a 90-day tourist visa in order to avoid raising suspicions or calling attention to the crime through visa overstay violations. Police accept bribes from establishments involved in trafficking or from traffickers attempting to cross borders illegally, and in prior years have been identified as clients of commercial sex venues investigated for suspected trafficking.

According to immigration officials, police, and media sources, foreign women in prostitution, many of whom were possible victims of sex trafficking, were sometimes detained en masse during law enforcement raids and then deported without proper screening, or as a result of arresting officers’ inability to derive pertinent information from the women due to their having been coached to provide identical accounts. For this reason, PNTL officers claimed they were not able to obtain sufficient evidence to prosecute the owners of a karaoke bar who may have subjected 67 foreign women to sex trafficking during the reporting period. The PNTL reported karaoke bar owners confiscated the passports of foreign workers and only surrendered them if the police ordered the foreign workers’ deportation.

The United States Department of State Office to Monitor and Combat Trafficking in Persons ranks Timor-Leste as a 'Tier 2' country.
