= Prostitution in Cape Verde =

Prostitution in Cape Verde is legal and commonplace. There are no prostitution laws on the islands except for those concerning trafficking and child prostitution. UNAIDS estimate there are 1,400 prostitutes in Cape Verde, and many were from Ghana and Senegal before being expelled by the police. Some turn to prostitution through poverty.

Sex tourism, including child sex tourism, is a major occurrence in Cape Verde, especially in Santa Maria and the tourist beach resorts on the Cape Verdian island of Sal. The islands are also a destination for female sex tourism.

Sex trafficking, and child prostitution are problems on the islands.

== Sex trafficking ==
Cabe Verde is primarily a source country for children subjected to sex trafficking within the country and a destination for women in forced prostitution. Boys and girls, some of whom may be foreign nationals, are exploited in sex trafficking in Santa Maria, Praia, and Mindelo, sometimes through child sex tourism. Increasing numbers of West African women have been identified in forced prostitution, including on Boa Vista and Sal Islands and sometimes through sex tourism. Children living in impoverished neighbourhoods with little state presence are also at risk, especially for sex trafficking. West African migrants may transit the archipelago en route to situations of exploitation in Europe. Some adult migrants from China and ECOWAS countries may receive low wages, work without contracts, and have irregular status, rendering them vulnerable to sex trafficking.

In 2016, the government increased anti-trafficking law enforcement efforts, but gaps remained. The penal code appears to prohibit all forms of trafficking in persons. Article 271 criminalises slavery and prescribes sufficiently stringent penalties of six to 12 years' imprisonment. Article 271-A makes it a crime to use force, fraud, or coercion for the purposes of sexual or labour exploitation and prescribes penalties of four to 10 years' imprisonment. When the victim is a minor, an undefined term which elsewhere in the criminal code is defined at 16, the penalty increases to six to 12 years' imprisonment. In addition to article 271-A, article 148 of the criminal code outlaws the promotion, encouragement, or facilitation of prostitution and sexual acts with minors younger than 16 years of age or persons suffering from mental incapacity with penalties of four to 10 years' imprisonment, or two to six years' imprisonment if the victim is between ages 16 and 18. Article 149 of the penal code punishes those who entice, transport, host, or receive children younger than 16 years of age or promote the conditions for sexual acts or prostitution in a foreign country with two to eight years' imprisonment.

The United States Department of State Office to Monitor and Combat Trafficking in Persons ranks Cape Verde as a 'Tier 2' country.
