= Prostitution in Bulgaria =

Prostitution in Bulgaria is itself legal, but organised prostitution brothels, prostitution rings, or other forms of prostitution procuring are prohibited. In the past, the Bulgarian government considered fully legalising and regulating prostitution.

The sex trade is a major source of income for Bulgarian criminals.

UNAIDS estimates there are 10,000 prostitutes in the country, and in 2013 there were 20,000 Bulgarian prostitutes working abroad and this was a source of foreign exchange earnings for Bulgaria. Because of poor socioeconomic conditions, a high number of Romani women are involved in prostitution. Nine NGOs offer outreach services to prostitutes in the main cities.

== History ==
Bulgaria became a principality in 1878. The regulation system, with registered prostitutes working in licensed brothels and tolerated as long as they subjected to regular examination for sexual diseases, regulated prostitution in Bulgaria for four decades until the 1920s.

The regulation system of tolerated prostitution attracted opposition and condemnation, and the licensed brothels were banned in the early 1920s. While formally banned, prostitution was nonetheless tolerated in the interwar period since the police routinely turned a blind eye to prostitution, and the law was not enforced until after the Communist takeover in the 1940s.

== Legal situation ==
Article 155 of the Criminal Code prohibits procuring and keeping premises used for prostitution:

(1) A person who persuades an individual to practise prostitution or acts as procurer or procuress for the performance of indecent touching or copulation, shall be punished by imprisonment of up to three years and by a fine from BGN 1,000 to 3,000
(2) A person who systematically places at the disposal of different persons premises for sexual intercourse or for acts of lewdness shall be punished by deprivation of liberty for up to five years and by a fine from BGN 1,000 to 5,000
(3) Where acts under Paragraphs 1 and 2 above have been committed with a venal goal in mind, punishment shall be imprisonment from one to six years and a fine from BGN 5,000 to 15,000.
(4) A person who persuades or forces another person to using drugs or analogues thereof for the purposes of practising prostitution, to performing copulation, indecent assault, intercourse or any other acts of sexual gratification with a person of the same sex, shall be punished by imprisonment for five to fifteen years and by a fine from BGN 10,000 to 50,000
(5) Where the act under Paragraphs 1 - 4 has been committed:

1. by an individual acting at the orders or in implementing a decision of an organised criminal group;
2. with regard to a person under 18 years of age or insane person;
3. with regard to two or more persons;
4. repeatedly;
5. at the conditions of a dangerous recidivism,

the punishment under pars. 1 and 2 shall be imprisonment from two to eight years and a fine from BGN five thousand to fifteen thousand, under Paragraph 3 - imprisonment from three to ten years and a fine from BGN ten thousand to twenty five thousand, and under Paragraph 4 - imprisonment from ten to twenty years and a fine from BGN hundred thousand to three thousand

Vagrancy and public order laws are used against prostitutes soliciting.

== Sex trafficking ==
In addition to being a transit and destination country for the sex trade, Bulgaria also remains one of the primary source countries of human trafficking in the EU. Bulgarian women and children are subjected to sex trafficking within the country, as well as in Europe, and the Middle East. Romanian girls are subjected to sex trafficking in Bulgaria. Government corruption creates an environment enabling some trafficking crimes, and officials have been investigated for suspected involvement in trafficking.

The Bulgarian government has stepped up its efforts to eradicate human trafficking. Authorities launched 66 sex trafficking investigations in 2016, compared with 71 investigations in 2015. Authorities prosecuted 72 defendants with sex trafficking in 2016 (55 in 2015). The government convicted 34 sex traffickers in 2016 (47 sex traffickers convicted in 2015). Only 12 of the 34 convicted traffickers, 34 percent, received a prison sentence that was not suspended, a similarly low rate as in the previous three years.

The United States Department of State Office to Monitor and Combat Trafficking in Persons ranks Bulgaria as a 'Tier 2' country.
