= Prostitution in Panama =

Prostitution in Panama is legal and regulated. Prostitutes are required to register and carry identification cards. However, the majority of prostitutes are not registered. There are 2,650 sex workers registered with the government in 2008, but there was no accurate information regarding the total number of persons practising prostitution in the country. Some estimate put the number of unregistered prostitutes at 4,000.

The main area of prostitution in Panama City is Bella Vista. Street prostitution also occurs on Avenida Ricardo Arias, Central Avenue and Avenida Perú.

There are many foreign prostitutes in the country, especially from Cuba, Venezuela and Colombia (Panama was part of Colombia until 1903). To work as a prostitute, foreign prostitutes need an "alternadora" visa. As this is stamped into their passport, many work unofficially on tourist visas to avoid effectively having "prostitute" stamped in their passport. Working without the correct visa and being unregistered is an administrative offence not a criminal offence and usually punished with a small fine if caught. Unregisted prostitutes can still access health services at clinics such as the one in Santa Ana, Panama City.

== Panama Canal Zone ==
During the construction of the Panama Canal (1904-1914), many prostitutes came to the canal zone to service the workers building the canal. Many were from the Caribbean, especially the English speaking islands. In 1905, the US Government arranged for several hundred women from Martinique to be transported to Panama. President Roosevelt launched an inquiry into the morality of these women, in case they had been brought in to work as prostitutes.

After the completion of the canal, most of the migrant labour force left, leaving mainly US troops and civilians. These US citizens became the main customers of the red-light districts in Panamanian cities close to the canal such as Panama City and Colon. (The US had deported 150 women back to the British Caribbean.)

The US government, concerned about the spread of STIs, tried to pressurise the Panamanian authorities into prohibiting prostitution and shutting down the red-light districts. The Panamanians resisted the US pressures to alter the laws within an independent state. They saw the prostitutes as a buffer between the US servicemen and Panamanian women. It countered the US's argument with the suggestion that it was the US servicemen giving STIs to the prostitutes not the other way around. However, Panama did introduce regulation of prostitution, including health checks.

During WWII, the Vincentian Fathers encouraged parishes to set up "Catholic recreational centers for servicemen" to try to get the serviceman away from the red-light districts.

== HIV ==
In 2005, the World Health Organization estimated that there was a 1.9% HIV prevalence rate amongst female sex workers compared to 0.92% prevalence rate amongst the overall adult population. However the figures were higher for sex workers in Panama City and Colon than for those in the rest of the country. A law on HIV/AIDS and sexually transmitted infections was adopted in 2000. In September 2016, a prostitute was sentenced to one years imprisonment for soliciting while knowingly being HIV positive.

== Sex trafficking ==
Panama is listed as a Tier 2 country by the US Department of State Office to Monitor and Combat Trafficking in Persons.

Panama is a source, transit, and destination country for men and women subjected to sex trafficking. Child victims of trafficking are typically Panamanian nationals subjected to commercial sex acts inside Panama. Panamanian women are subjected to sex trafficking in other countries, including The Bahamas and Guyana. In Panama, most identified trafficking victims are foreign adults exploited in sex trafficking, especially women from Brazil, Colombia, Venezuela, Cuba, the Dominican Republic, Honduras, and Nicaragua. In 2016, the number of foreign transgender victims subjected to sex trafficking increased. Transgender individuals are discriminated against in Panama, making them more vulnerable to trafficking, especially given the high demand in Panama for sexual services from this population. Traffickers recruit female victims with promises of good jobs and high salaries in the housekeeping and restaurant industries, as well as for modelling and prostitution, but exploit them in sex trafficking.

Authorities have identified potential sex trafficking victims among Eastern European women working in nightclubs. Men from the United States have been investigated as child sex tourists in Panama. Panamanian and European officials report some men and women from Central America who transit Panama en route to the Caribbean or Europe are subjected to sex trafficking in their destination countries.

== Child prostitution ==
Panamanian officials continue to prosecute cases of sexual abuse of children in urban and rural areas, as well as within indigenous communities. Officials believed that commercial sexual exploitation of children occurs, including in tourist areas in Panama City and in beach communities, although they do not keep separate statistics.

=== Legislation ===
Article 187, Penal Code this Article states that anyone who uses, allows or permits a minor to participate in acts or indecent exposure or pornography, whether or not actually recorded, photographed or filmed, will be liable to imprisonment for six to eight years. The same penalty applies to anyone who uses email, the Internet or any other regional or mass media to incite minors to engage in online sex, or to provide or stimulate sexual services, through any of the above means, by phone or in person.

Article 190, Penal Code, imposes a penalty of imprisonment for eight to ten years for anyone who promotes, directs, organizes, advertises, invites, facilitates or arranges for any local or mass media, local or international sex tourism, the recruitment of a minor aged between fourteen and seventeen for sexual exploitation, whether this actually takes place or not. The penalty will increase by half the maximum sentence if the victim is under the age of fourteen.
