= Prostitution in Niger =

Prostitution in Niger is illegal but common in the cities, near mines and around military bases. Per UNAIDS 2016 estimates, there were 46,630 sex workers in the country. Many have turned to prostitution because of poverty.

Some Nigerian prostitutes ply their trade on the Niger border as many prostitutes are persecuted in their homeland and Niger is perceived as being more amiable and less likely to prosecute them for their trade. Nigerian men prefer to cross the border to seek sex as the punishment in Islamic Northern Nigeria is 50 lashes for "procuration of woman".

In 2017 the government ordered a clampdown on prostitution throughout the country.

== HIV ==
HIV is a problem in the country. Preventative measures, including distribution of condoms have seen prevalence rates fall in recent years. Sex workers are one of the high risk groups. In 2016 UNAIDS estimated there was a 17% prevalence rate amongst sex workers.

== Sex trafficking ==
Niger is a source, transit, and destination country for women and children subjected to sex trafficking. Victims from Benin, Burkina Faso, Cameroon, Ghana, Algeria, Mali, Nigeria, and Togo are exploited in sex trafficking in Niger. Corrupt marabouts or loosely organised clandestine networks may also place Nigerien girls into commercial sex. Nigerien girls are subjected to sex trafficking along the border with Nigeria, sometimes with the complicity of their families. In the Tahoua region of Niger, some girls in forced marriages may be exploited in commercial sex after fleeing these nominal unions. In Algeria, Nigerien women and girls were vulnerable to sex trafficking.

Nigerien women and children are recruited from Niger and transported to Nigeria, North Africa, the Middle East, and Europe where they are subjected to sex trafficking. Some migrants were suspected to be traffickers, particularly Nigerien migrants to Algeria. Traffickers operated primarily small, freelance operations in loosely organised networks of individuals, including some marabouts. There have been reports of freelance business people (both men and women) and informal travel agencies that recruit women to the Middle East or to northern Nigeria for sex trafficking. Niger is a transit country for women and children from West and Central Africa migrating to North Africa and Western Europe, where some are subjected to sex trafficking. In some instances, law enforcement and border officials have accepted bribes from traffickers to facilitate the transportation of victims through the country.

The United States Department of State Office to Monitor and Combat Trafficking in Persons ranks Niger as a 'Tier 2 Watch List' country.
