= Prostitution in Barbados =

Prostitution in Barbados is legal but related activities such as brothel keeping and solicitation are prohibited. The country is a sex tourism destination, including female sex tourism.

In the capital Bridgetown, there is a red-light district in Nelson street, and street prostitution around The Garrison. About half of the prostitutes are from Guyana and Jamaica.

In 2014, a group of prostitutes in the south of the island started to blackmail clients. They would arrange group sex sessions with the client and later claim one of the prostitutes were underage. One man paid $70,000 to prevent a fake statutory rape claim.

Sex trafficking is a problem in the country.

== 2018 general election ==
In March 2018, local prostitute Natalie Harewood, announced her intention to stand as candidate for the Bridgetown City seat in the forthcoming general election. Initially her campaign manager was Charles Lewis, the President of the Adult Industry Association in Barbados. Lewis resigned and formed a new political party, the Political Prostitutes Party (PPP). His intention was to recruit sex workers, strippers, webcam performers and porn actresses to stand in all 30 seats in the election. However, Lewis was unable to find enough candidates and the PPP did not stand at the election.

== Sex trafficking ==
Barbados is a source and destination country for women and children subjected to sex trafficking. Authorities and NGOs report foreign women have been forced into prostitution in Barbados. Legal and undocumented immigrants from Jamaica and Guyana are especially vulnerable to trafficking. Child sex trafficking occurs in Barbados. There are anecdotal reports by authorities and NGOs that children are subjected to sex trafficking, including by parents and caregivers. Previously, traffickers operated as part of an organization; more recently they appear to operate individually. Authorities have noted an increased use of social media as a means of trolling for victims.

In June 2016, the Trafficking In Persons Prevention Act (TIPPA) was enacted. The TIPPA criminalizes all forms of human trafficking and is generally in line with the definition of international law, defining “exploitation” broadly to include slavery, practices similar to slavery, forced labor, domestic and sexual servitude, and the exploitation of the prostitution of another or other forms of commercial sexual exploitation. It also requires “means” of force, fraud or coercion, except with regard to the exploitation of children. The TIPPA covers transnational as well as domestic trafficking crimes, makes evidence of past sexual behavior inadmissible, disallows the defense of consent, and makes withholding or destroying travel documents a crime. The punishment for labor or sex trafficking of adults is the same: 25 years in prison, a fine of one million Barbados dollar (BBD) ($495,050), or both penalties. Labor or sex trafficking of children is punished by a fine of two million (BBD) ($990,099), life imprisonment, or both penalties.

The United States Department of State Office to Monitor and Combat Trafficking in Persons ranks Barbados as a 'Tier 2' country.
