= Prostitution in the Democratic Republic of the Congo =

Prostitution in the Democratic Republic of the Congo is legal but related activities are prohibited. The Congolese penal code punishes pimping, running a bawdy house or brothel, the exploitation of debauchery or prostitution, as well as forced prostitution. Activities that incite minors or promote the prostitution of others have been criminalised. The government does little to enforce the law. During the colonial era and the years that followed independence, the Ministry of Health issued calling cards identifying professional sex workers and provided them with medical health checks. However, this system was abandoned in the 1980s. Public order laws are sometimes used against sex workers. Street prostitutes report harassment, violence and extortion from the police. UNAIDS estimated there are 2.9 million sex workers in the country.

Food insecurity and extreme poverty are now the main reasons why women in the DRC become prostitutes. Traders make up the majority of clients, along with officials working for national and international NGOs. Many sex workers earn between $2 and $5 and payment is sometimes made in the form of food or other goods. Prostitutes working in bars and nightclubs receive between $10 and $20, and are known as "Londoners" as they dress like British girls on a Saturday night out. "VIP prostitution" operates from hotels, with sex workers earning between $50 and $100. Some Congolese prostitutes are from abroad or homeless children who have been accused of witchcraft.

== HIV ==
The Democratic Republic of the Congo (DR Congo) was one of the first countries in Central Africa to recognize HIV, registering cases of HIV among hospital patients as early as 1983. UNAIDS reported in 2016 that there was an HIV prevalence of 5.7% amongst sex workers, compared with 0.7% amongst the general population. There is a reluctance to use condoms amongst the clients of sex workers, and will pay double the price for unprotected sex. Médecins Sans Frontières distribute condoms to sex workers and encourage their use.

== Child prostitution ==
Child prostitution is a problem in the country but is generally ignored by the authorities. NGOs such as Association de Solidarité Internationale (ASI) and Reiper work to try and alleviate the problem.

There is evidence of sexual abuse of children by soldiers during the Continental and Civil wars. Between 2004 and 2008 there were 140 recorded instances of Congolese, Indian and UN Peace Corps soldiers paying for sex with children, with local criminal gangs being implicated.

Child prostitution in the country takes many forms:

- "Shegues" - Boys and girls from 13 to 16 years old who have run away from home and survive from the proceeds of street prostitution.
- "Kamuke" or "Petit Poussins" - Boys aged 10 to 17 years who take a passive role in sexual intercourse.
- "Filles Londoniennes" - Girls from 10 to 15 who offer sexual services in urban areas
- "Encadreurs Filles" - Girls offered to visiting dignitaries by the host as a sign of appreciation. This activity is becoming rarer.

== Sex trafficking ==
The DRC is a source, destination, and transit country for women, and children subjected to sex trafficking. Women and girls were forced to marry or serve as sex slaves for members of some armed groups. Some street children are suspected to be exploited in sex trafficking. An NGO reported some families send their children to Kinshasa, after being promised educational opportunities for the children; however, upon arrival, the children are subjected to sex trafficking. Some Congolese women and girls subjected to forced marriage are highly vulnerable to sex trafficking. Congolese women and children migrate to other countries in Africa, the Middle East, and Europe, where some are exploited in sex trafficking.

The 2006 sexual violence statute (Law 6/018) prohibits sexual slavery, sex trafficking, and child and forced prostitution and prescribes penalties ranging from five to 20 years imprisonment.

The United States Department of State Office to Monitor and Combat Trafficking in Persons ranks the Democratic Republic of the Congo as a Tier 3 country.

== See also ==
- Women in the Democratic Republic of the Congo
