= Prostitution in Fiji =

Prostitution in Fiji is legal, but most activities connected with it are illegal: brothel keeping, pimping and buying or selling sex in public. Street workers make up the bulk of Fiji's prostitutes. Many of the prostitutes are Asian, especially Chinese that provide sexual services for the growing number of tourists arriving in the country and also locals. Some come into the country on student visas. In 2014, it was estimated that there were 857 sex workers in Fiji. Even though buying and selling sex in public is illegal in Fiji, police have no legal authority to arrest prostitutes without an official report being lodged for the police to take action.

Child trafficking is a problem and many foundations are urging Fiji to crack down on child trafficking.

== Legislation ==
The Crimes Decree 2009 sets out the legislation regarding sex work and replaces the provisions of the earlier Penal Code. The Decree criminalises the following aspects of prostitution:

- Section 217 - Procuring for prostitution
- Section 230 - Knowingly living on the earnings of prostitution
- Section 231 - Soliciting for immoral purposes, seeking or buying sex in a public place
- Section 233 - Brothel keeping
- Section 233 - Anti-trafficking provisions

== Law enforcement ==
Since new legislation was introduced in 2009, there has been increased enforcement, especially towards transgender sex workers, street workers and their clients. Sex workers report that in 2011 they were rounded up by the military and suffered humiliation and abuse and were subjected to forced labour. During police crackdowns sex workers are subjected to assault, theft and rape. Police are allegedly open to bribes.

== Sex trafficking ==
Fiji is a source, destination, and transit country for women and children subjected to sex trafficking. Family members, taxi drivers, foreign tourists, businessmen, and crew on foreign fishing vessels have allegedly exploited Fijian children in sex trafficking. Some Fijian children are at risk of trafficking as families follow a traditional practice of sending them to live with relatives or families in larger cities, where they may be subjected to coerced to engage in sexual activity in exchange for food, clothing, shelter, or school fees. Women from China, Thailand, Malaysia, and other East Asian countries are deceptively recruited by the lure of legitimate jobs in their home countries or while visiting Fiji, sometimes by Chinese criminal organisations, and then exploited in illegal brothels (posing as massage parlors and spas), local hotels and private homes.

The United States Department of State Office to Monitor and Combat Trafficking in Persons ranks Fiji as a 'Tier 2 Watch List' country.
