= Prostitution in Guam =

Prostitution in Guam is illegal but is practised covertly, especially in massage parlours. Although massage parlours are sometimes raided, generally the authorities turn a blind eye.

== Legislation ==
Chapter 28 (Public Indecency) of the Guam Crimes and Correctional Code outlaws prostitution as well as soliciting, compelling, promoting or abetting prostitution. The latter includes using the services of a prostitute. The relevant articles are:

- § 28.10. Prostitution Defined: Defines terms used in the legislation
- § 28.15. Loitering for the Purpose of Soliciting to Engage in Prostitution: Criminalises solicitation
- § 28.20. Promoting Prostitution: Criminalises owning, controlling, managing or supervising a place of prostitution, inciting somebody to enter prostitution
- § 28.25. Abetting Prostitution: Criminalises soliciting a person to patronise a prostitute, procures a prostitute for himself, transports a person in or out of Guam for the purposes of prostitution
- § 28.30. Compelling Prostitution: Criminalises forced prostitution and child prostitution

The Department of Public Health and Social Services mandates STI testing massage parlour workers.

== History ==
When the island was discovered by Portuguese explorer Ferdinand Magellan, the indigenous Chamorros already practised prostitution and regarded it as a prestigious occupation.

During the Japanese occupation of Guam in WW2, some local Chamorro women were forced to work in the Japanese military brothels set up on the island (I Tiempon Chapones) along with the Japanese and Korean woman the Japanese had brought there. After the American liberation of Guam, a number of brothels were set up to serve the American servicemen.

The establishment of US bases on the island after the islands were liberated in WW2, increased the demand for prostitution.

== Red-light district ==
The tourist area of the Tumon district of Tamuning is the island's de facto red-light district. There are many massage parlours, with 75% opening 24 hours a day.

There have been ongoing discussions about establishing a legitimate red-light district since 2006. A Bill was introduced to the Legislature in 2010 by vice-speaker Benjamin Cruz. It proposed re-zoning Tumon and having all the adult entertainment establishments in one designated area. The Bill did not pass into law.

== Sex trafficking ==
Sex trafficking is a problem on the island, although due to poor reporting the extent is not fully known.

In 2012, a 70-year-old female was sentenced to life imprisonment for sex trafficking. She owned the "Blue House" karaoke bar where women were trafficked to and from Chuuk in Micronesia. The women were promised employment in restaurants or stores but on arrival were forced to work as prostitutes. The manageress of the bar and 2 police officers also faced charges for their involvement. A third police officer disciplined by the police department.

It has been suggested that lax policies on massage parlours contributes to sex trafficking.
