= Prostitution in Djibouti =

Prostitution in Djibouti is illegal but tolerated. UNAIDS estimate there are 2,900 prostitutes in the country. Many work from bars and nightclubs. There is a red-light district in Djibouti City. Quartier 2 is a neighbourhood in Djibouti city where there are numerous small bars with large numbers of Ethiopian sex workers.

== Overview ==
During World War I, the French set up military brothels for their troops. These continued for the use of the Foreign Legion until 1978. Due to its strategic position, troops from United States, China, France, Japan, Saudi Arabia, Italy. Russia, Spain, Germany and the United Kingdom are stationed in bases in Djibouti. The presence of these troops increase the demand for prostitution. During an investigation in 2015, it was found almost half of the 775th Engineering Detachment of the Tennessee Army National Guard had used prostitutes whilst stationed in Djibouti. Many Ethiopian women in Djibouti work as domestic workers, nannies, cleaners, and sex workers. Sex work is particularly lucrative in Djibouti due to the presence of foreign military personnel, port workers, truck drivers, and international capital. Ethiopian girls are often forced into prostitution in Djibouti.

== HIV prevalence ==
A cross-sectional HIV-1 serosurvey conducted in Djibouti during the first quarter of 1991 among high-risk groups found HIV-1 infection in 36.0% (n= 292) of street prostitutes, 15.3% (n= 360) of prostitutes working as bar hostesses, and 10.4% (n= 193) of males diagnosed with sexually transmitted disease. Multivariate analysis found that HIV-1 seropositivity among prostitutes was associated with Ethiopian nationality, street-based sex work, and residence in Djibouti for two years or less. The study concluded that prostitution, particularly street prostitution, was a major route of HIV-1 transmission in Djibouti.

In 2018, HIV prevalence amongst sex workers in the country was 12.9%.

== Sex trafficking ==
Djibouti is a source, transit, and destination country for women and children subjected to sex trafficking, traffickers exploit migrants transiting through Djibouti. In 2023, an international organization estimated that more than 200,000 migrants passed through the country by land and sea, the majority of them Ethiopians. Men, women, and children, primarily from Ethiopia and Somalia, and to a lesser extent from Eritrea, transit Djibouti voluntarily en route to Yemen and other locations in the Middle East, particularly Saudi Arabia, to seek work. An unknown number of these migrants are subjected to sex trafficking in their intended destinations.

Djiboutian and migrant women and street children are vulnerable to sex trafficking in Djibouti City, the Ethiopia-Djibouti trucking corridor, and Obock, the main departure point for Yemen. Some migrants intending to be smuggled may be transported or detained against their will and subsequently subjected to trafficking and other forms of abuse in Djibouti. Some migrant women reportedly were subjected to domestic servitude and forced prostitution in Djibouti.

The 2016 Law No. 133, On the Fight Against Trafficking in Persons and Illicit Smuggling of Migrants, criminalizes all forms of trafficking; it prescribes penalties of five to 10 years imprisonment, and 20 when aggravating factors are present, which are sufficiently stringent and commensurate with those for other serious crime.

The United States Department of State Office to Monitor and Combat Trafficking in Persons ranks Djibouti as a 'Tier 2' country.
