= Prostitution in Burkina Faso =

Prostitution in Burkina Faso is not specifically prohibited by the law, but soliciting and pimping are illegal. Burkinabe society only accepts sexual intercourse within marriage. In 2009, Voice of America reported that the number of prostitutes in Burkina Faso had increased as a result of the country's poverty. The increase in prostitution has given rise to fears of an increase in the number of Burkinabés infected with HIV and AIDS. UNAIDS estimate there to be 31,000 prostitutes in the country.

Burkina Faso has been referred to as "a theatre of child labour" as many children are trafficked into the country for forced prostitution as well as domestic work. In 1990 the Burkina Faso government ratified the UN Convention on the Rights of the Child and there are laws against the commercial sexual exploitation of children. The government has taken measures to ensure the safety of children against sexual abuse and exploitation, but it is still prevalent. Children from poor families relied on prostitution to meet their daily needs and, at times, to help their needy parents. Trafficked children, primarily Nigerian nationals, were also subject to sexual abuse and forced prostitution.

In the capital, Ouagadougou, the main area of prostitution is in the Dapoya district.

Although homosexuality is illegal in the country, male prostitution takes place, especially in the tourist areas.

== Forms of prostitution ==
=== Sédentaires ===
Sédentaires (French for 'sedentary') sex workers sit outside their houses on stools trying to attract clients. They tend to be older women and have lower rates than other sex workers.

=== Trotteuses ===
Trotteuses (French for 'trotters') are street prostitutes. They walk the streets in areas known for prostitution. Many of them are foreign, particularly from Ghana and Togo.

=== Professionnelles de luxe ===
Professionnelles de luxe (French for 'luxury professionals') are call girls who offer their services, by appointment, in hotels, motels and clients' residences. Their clients are usually businessmen, travellers or tourists.

=== Bar waitresses ===
Waitresses that work in bars, nightclub and hotels sometimes offer sexual services as a sideline. They may use guest rooms, or the client's or waitress's home.

=== Transhumantes ===
These sex workers work for a "Granny" or a "Tantie" who acts as their pimp. They travel from town to town and work in places such as construction sites and gold mines. They tend to be younger women between the ages of 16 and 25.

=== Mbaraan ===
Many young women, especially high school students, turn to part-time prostitution to afford "luxury" goods such as fashionable European clothing.

=== Rural areas ===
Some women in small rural areas will stand by main roads trying to attract clients. This may happen by day or by night.

== HIV ==
Like other Sub-Saharan African countries the prevalence of HIV/AIDS infection is relatively high, although it is dropping. The country has one of the highest prevalences in West Africa. In 1999, the adult prevalence was 6.4%, by 2016 it had dropped to 0.8%.

Sex workers are a high risk group. Prevalence has fallen from 53% in 1998, to 16.2% in 2016

== Sex trafficking ==
Burkina Faso is a source, transit, and destination country for women and children subjected to sex trafficking. Burkinabe girls are exploited in sex trafficking. Burkinabe children are transported to Côte d'Ivoire, Mali, and Niger for sex trafficking. To a lesser extent, traffickers recruit women for ostensibly legitimate employment in Lebanon, Qatar, Saudi Arabia, and various European countries and subsequently subject them to forced prostitution. Burkina Faso is a transit country for traffickers transporting children from Mali to Côte d'Ivoire and women and girls from Côte d'Ivoire to Saudi Arabia. It is a destination for children subjected to trafficking from neighbouring countries, including Côte d'Ivoire, Ghana, Guinea, Mali, Niger, and Nigeria. Women from other West African countries are fraudulently recruited for employment in Burkina Faso and subsequently subjected to forced prostitution. Nigerian girls are exploited in sex trafficking in Burkina Faso. Nepalese traffickers have subjected Tibetan women to sex trafficking in Burkina Faso.

The 2008 anti-trafficking law criminalises all forms of trafficking and prescribes penalties of five to 10 years imprisonment, which are sufficiently stringent and commensurate with penalties prescribed for other serious crimes, such as rape. Law No. 11-2014/AN criminalises "child prostitution" and the sale of children—including the sale of children for crimes not considered trafficking in the 2000 UN TIP Protocol.

The United States Department of State Office to Monitor and Combat Trafficking in Persons ranks Burkina Faso as a Tier 2 country.
