= Prostitution in Bhutan =

Prostitution is illegal in Bhutan but in many of Bhutan's border towns there are people openly practising in the sex trade. Prostitution mainly occurs in bars, clubs and hotels. Some of the sex workers are employed by bar and hotel owners to attract customers. Prostitution also occurs in the capital, Thimphu.

There are thought to be 400–500 sex workers in the country, many from poor backgrounds, who enter prostitution for financial reasons.

In 2017, the NGO Lhak-Sam proposed that sex work was legalised by the government, but the proposal was turned down.

Sex trafficking is a problem in the country.

== Sex tourism ==
Bhutan is becoming a destination for sex tourism for people from the West and India. Some high-end prostitutes are involved, tourists being more likely to be able to afford their fees. Some of the tourists are looking for sex with boys and girls. The Guides Association of Bhutan report some tourists ask for female 'guides' to accompany them during their stay in the country.

== Legislation ==
The Penal Code of Bhutan criminalises prostitution:

Chapter 26 - Prostitution and Related Offences

- Prostitution

373. A defendant shall be guilty of the offence of prostitution, if the defendant offers, agrees to engage, or engages in sexual conduct with another person for money or property.

- Grading of Prostitution

374. The offence of prostitution shall be a misdemeanour.

- Promotion of prostitution

375. A defendant shall be guilty of the offence of promotion of prostitution, if the defendant:

(a) Owns, leases, controls, manages, supervises a brothel or otherwise keeps a prostitution business;
(b) Procures a person for a house of prostitution;
(c) Encourages, induces, or otherwise purposely causes another to become or remain as a prostitute;
(d) Solicits a person to patronise a prostitute;
(e) Procures a prostitute for a patron;
(f) Requires a prostitute to give a part or all of the money or property received as a result of the prostitution.

- Grading of Promotion of prostitution

376. The offence of promotion of prostitution shall be:

(a) A misdemeanour;
(b) A felony of the fourth degree, if the person used for prostitution is a child of above 12 years and below 18 years; or
(c) A felony of the third degree, if the person used for prostitution is a child of 12 years and below.

- Patronising a prostitute

377. A defendant shall be guilty of the offence of patronising a prostitute, if the defendant gives money, property, or other gratification to engage in sexual act.

- Grading of Patronising a prostitute

378. The offence of patronising a prostitute shall be:

(a) A misdemeanour;
(b) A felony of the fourth degree, if the person used for prostitution is a child of above 12 years and below 18 years; or
(c) A felony of the third degree, if the person used for prosecution is a child of 12 years and below.

- Trafficking a person for prostitution

379. A defendant shall be guilty of the offence of trafficking a person for prostitution, if the defendant transports, sells or buys a person into or outside of Bhutan with the purpose of engaging that person in prostitution.

- Grading of trafficking a person for prostitution

380. The offence of trafficking a person for prostitution shall be a felony of the:

(a) Third degree;
(b) Second degree, if the person is a child of above 12 years and below 18 years;
(c) First degree, if the person is a child of 12 years and below.

== Sex trafficking ==
Bhutan is a source and destination country for women and children vulnerable to sex trafficking. Bhutanese girls, working as domestic servants and entertainers in drayungs or karaoke bars, may be subjected to sex trafficking, coerced by debt and threats of physical abuse.

The United States Department of State Office to Monitor and Combat Trafficking in Persons ranks Bhutan as a 'Tier 2 Watch List' country.
