= Prostitution in Ivory Coast =

Prostitution in Ivory Coast (Côte d'Ivoire) is legal, but associated activities, such as soliciting, pandering or running brothels, are illegal. Sex workers report law enforcement is sparse and corrupt. Police sometimes harass sex workers and demand bribes or sexual favours. Transgender prostitutes are often targeted by police and soldiers and subjected to violence. It was estimated in 2014 that there were 9,211 prostitutes in the country.

The civil war has left many women in need for wages, so some have resorted to prostitution, as there is high unemployment.

In the capital, Abidjan, most of the prostitutes come from Ghana, Nigeria, Togo, Mali, Senegal and other West African states, the largest group being from Ghana. Ivorian soldiers and UN Peacekeeping personnel are amongst the clients.

In the cities, sex workers have started organisations to protect their interests. Often they cater for a particular ethnic group. Each organisation has a president and other officers, these are normally older prostitutes who are regarded as "wiser".

Sex Tourism is also a problem in the Ivory Coast.

== Local nomenclature ==
- "Serpents" - In Abidjan, street walkers are known as "serpents" because of the hissing sounds they make to attract clients. Rue Pierre et Marie Curie in the city's red-light district of Marcory Zone 4 is known locally as "Serpent Street".
- "Dioula women" - Younger prostitutes originating from Mali. After a short stint working as prostitutes they usually become traders in local markets.
- "Karoua women" - Older Zarma or Hausa women, usually divorced, from Ghana.
- "Evolue" - These women, from various countries in French West Africa, seek clients in bars and nightclubs.
- "TouTou" - Coming from the British West African states, these women are mainly street prostitutes. The name is derived from 'two shillings, two pence'; a prostitute who doesn't charge much.

== History ==
Prior to the arrival of the Europeans, a form of institutional prostitution known as abrakree was prominent among the Southwest Akan of the Gold and Ivory Coasts. The political elite acquired women, usually slaves, to service the sexual needs of the unmarried males. They were initiated by religious rites and their earnings were controlled by the state. After a visit to Assini (Note: Harley and Ampofo state that Assini was located on the Gold Coast but Acheampong writes that it was located in Ivory Coast.) in 1701, Jean Barbot documented that the abrakree in Assini distinguished themselves from other women by wearing a cloth of white linen around their head. Married men were forbidden to use their services, and punishment was severe.

In the 1960s, many French prostitutes came to the country, mainly from Paris and Marseille. They worked as barmaids at bars and nightclubs, predominately in Abidjan. They charged high fees, but the bar owner took a per-client "air conditioning" commission. Because of the high fees, clients were Europeans or elite Africans.

Ghanaian woman started to migrate to the Ivory Coast to work as prostitutes in the 1970s due to a downturn in the Ghanaian economy. This migration continued, and in the 1990s over half of the prostitutes in Abidjan were from Ghana.

== HIV ==
As with other countries in West Africa, Ivory Coast has an HIV epidemic. Sex workers are a high risk group, and condom use was previously not common, leading to 70% of sex workers in Abidjan being HIV positive in 1995. Aggressive public outreach campaigns and education interventions targeted key high-risk populations, such as sex workers, which brought the infection rate down to 40% in 1998.

Continued campaigns, education, condom distribution and access to better health care brought the HIV prevalence amongst sex workers down to 26.6% in 2011, and 11% in 2016.

== Sex trafficking ==
Ivory Coast is a source, transit, and destination country for women and children subjected to sex trafficking. Trafficking within the country is more prevalent than transnational trafficking, and the majority of identified victims are children. Due to a stronger emphasis on monitoring and combating child trafficking within the country, the prevalence of adult trafficking may be under reported. Ivorian women and girls are primarily subjected to forced labor in domestic service and restaurants in Côte d'Ivoire but are also exploited in sex trafficking. Some women and girls recruited from Ghana and Nigeria as waitresses are subjected to sex trafficking. Officials note illegal Ivorian migrants in Algeria are vulnerable to trafficking due to their irregular and illegal status. A lack of comprehensive data on trafficking in Côte d'Ivoire renders the full scope of the problem unknown.

The United States Department of State Office to Monitor and Combat Trafficking in Persons ranks Ivory Coast as a Tier 2 country.
