= Prostitution in Lithuania =

Prostitution in Lithuania is illegal, but it is common. Law enforcement is weak, corrupt and is reputedly connected to organised crime. It is estimated that there are 3,000 prostitutes in the capital Vilnius. Many prostitutes in Lithuania are foreigners, (Note: In regard to their numbers, according to a report from 2001, "expert evaluation vary of about 20-30%".) primarily from Russia, Belarus, and Ukraine. Street prostitution, including underage prostitutes, is generally controlled by criminal elements.

Sex trafficking is a problem in the country.

== Legal situation ==
Both prostitution itself and buying sex are prohibited by the Code of Administrative Offences. Related activities are prohibited by the Criminal Code. Public order laws are also used against prostitutes.

=== Code of Administrative Offences ===
Prostitution itself and the clients of prostitutes are criminalised by Article 182^{1} of the Administrative Code. The penalty is a fine of €86 to €144 for a single offence and €144 to €288 for repeat offences. Repeat offenders may also be subject to administrative arrest for up to thirty days

=== Criminal Code ===
The following are offences under the criminal code:

Article 307. Gaining Profit from Another Person’s Prostitution

1. Profit from another person’s prostitution or from procuration for prostitution (maximum sentence 4 years imprisonment)
2. Organises or is in charge of prostitution or transports a person with his consent for prostitution into or out of Lithuania (max 6 years)
3. Profit from the prostitution of a minor or organises or is in charge of the prostitution of the minor or transports the minor with his consent for prostitution into or out of Lithuania (max 8 years)

Article 308. Involvement in Prostitution

1. Involving a person in prostitution (max 3 years)
2. Involves in prostitution a person dependent on him financially, subordinate in office or otherwise or involves a person in prostitution by using physical or mental coercion or by deceit or who, in any manner, involves in prostitution a minor (7 years)

== Sex trafficking ==
Lithuania is a source, transit, and destination country for women and girls subjected to sex trafficking. Observers estimate 40 percent of identified Lithuanian trafficking victims are women and girls subjected to sex trafficking within the country. Lithuanian women are also subjected to sex trafficking in Western Europe and Scandinavia. Vietnamese adults and children transiting through Lithuania may be trafficking victims. The approximately 4,000 boys and girls institutionalised in more than 95 orphanages are especially vulnerable to trafficking.

Articles 147 and 157 of the criminal code prohibit all forms of trafficking and prescribe penalties ranging from two to 12 years imprisonment.

In March 2015, prosecutors announced an investigation into allegations that the director of an orphanage sexually exploited boys and operated a sex trafficking ring inside the institution, offering young boys to paedophiles. The investigation remained ongoing during the reporting period. In January 2015, prosecutors announced the investigation of a state-run residential institution for children with special needs; teenage residents allegedly had been subjecting girl residents to sex trafficking. The orphanage's director defended her institution by saying such activity is common at all Lithuanian orphanages. In March 2017, the court sentenced four men to two to four and a half years in jail for sex with juvenile residents of this orphanage and imposed one to three years probation sentences to four girls for facilitating prostitution. Prosecutors will appeal the decision asking the higher instance court to sentence the criminals for human trafficking.

The United States Department of State Office to Monitor and Combat Trafficking in Persons ranks Lithuania as a 'Tier 1' country.

== See also ==
- Prostitution in Europe
