= Prostitution in Taiwan =

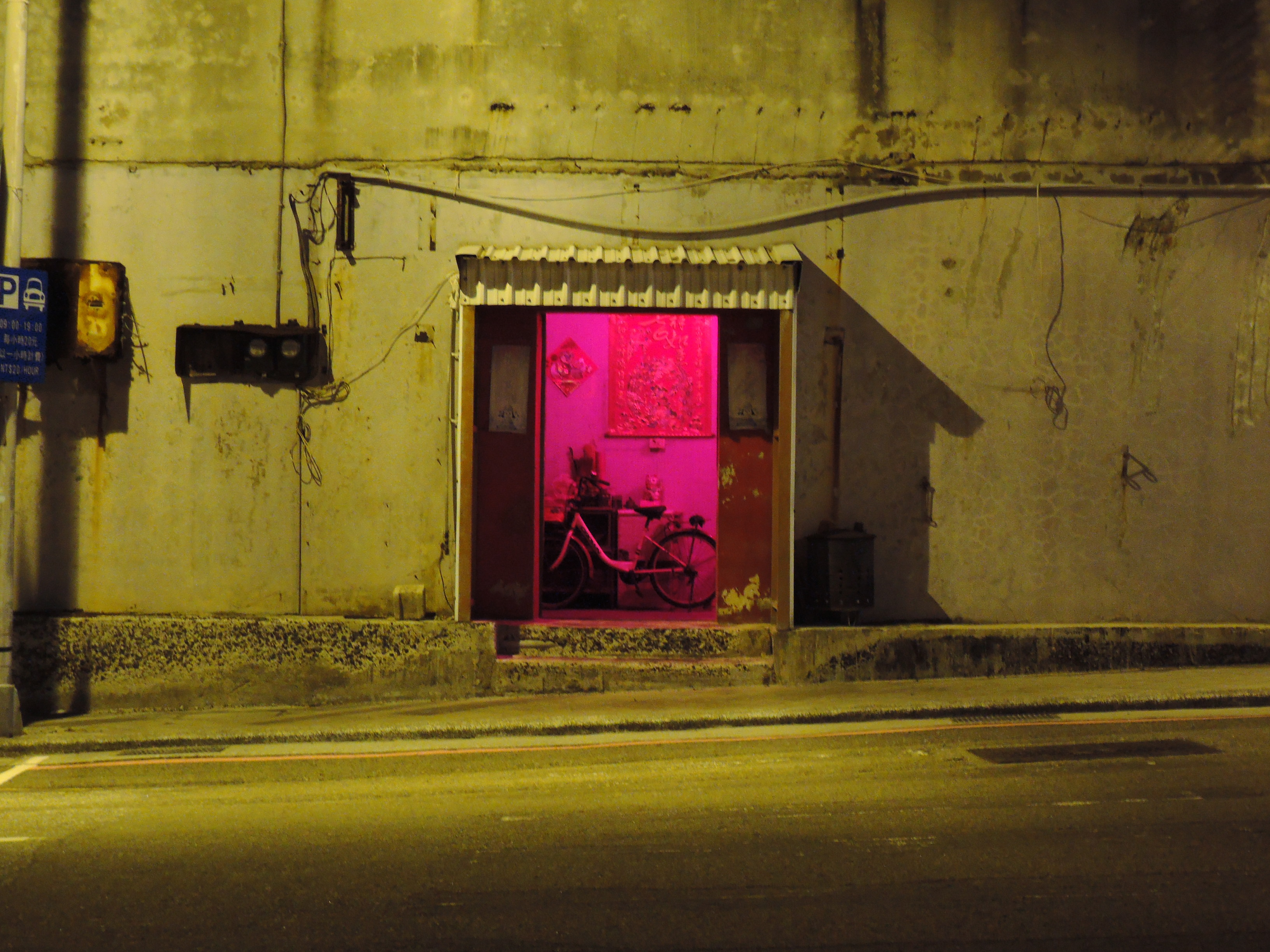
"Qin Paradise", one of the last brothels in Taiwan

Prostitution in Taiwan was made illegal under a 1991 law. However, legislation was introduced in 2011 to allow local governments in Taiwan to set up "special sex zones" (Chinese: 性專區) where prostitution is permitted. Outside these zones prostitution is illegal. As of 2017, no "special sex zones" have been created.

== History ==
=== Japanese rule (1895–1945) ===
During the period of Japanese rule (1895–1945), geisha houses and brothels were authorized to operate in certain districts of Taiwan. Later, geishas evolved into "hostesses". As late as the 1950s, many girls who were indentured by their parents into prostitution for financial reasons consented out of filial piety. During World War II, the Japanese recruited or coerced women into serving as comfort women.

During this period, Korean women came to work as prostitutes for the Japanese in Taiwan or were coerced into sexual slavery.

=== Postwar Nationalist Government (1945–) ===
When the Republic of China took control in 1945, the Chinese Nationalist government initially banned most hostesses and prostitutes, labeling prostitution an immoral practice encouraged by the Japanese. At the same time, however, the Ministry of Defense maintained official brothels on outer islands to provide sexual services to the many single military men who arrived from China in 1949. In 1956, the government revived the policy of registering and licensing prostitutes under the Measures for the Administration of Taiwan Province of Prostitutes.

Rapid industrialization in the 1960s brought an influx of young people into the cities, giving rise to a coffee-house subculture, where female hostesses catered to young male workers. At roughly the same time, the opening of two U.S. army bases spawned bars and dance halls to cater to the American military population. The majority of bar girls servicing US troops in Taiwan were Taiwan Aboriginal women. The prostitutes patronised by foreigners at Beitou hot springs in Taiwan during this period were Taiwan Aboriginal women ("young tribal girls from the mountains") whose clients included Japanese businessmen who later switched to sex tourism of South Korean women in 1972 after Japan ended formal diplomatic relations with Taiwan.

Government concern over immorality led to increased police attention directed at intimacy in public, and sometimes in private. The sex trade became increasingly controversial; in 1974 the government stopped licensing new brothels, and in the 1980s, a campaign aimed at rescuing Taiwanese aborigine girls forced into prostitution grew into an anti-prostitution movement that successfully lobbied for outright banning of prostitution across Taiwan. The last jurisdiction to outlaw prostitution was the city of Taipei, in 1997, under mayor Chen Shui-bian. However, Chen lost the next election and his successor, Ma Ying-jeou, allowed a grace period that extended to April 2001.

=== Criminalization (1991) ===
Sex work became illegal in Taiwan under Article 80 of the Social Order and Maintenance Act 1991, which replaced the Police Offence Law of the 1950s and criminalized the mainly female population of sex workers. Sex workers could be detained for a maximum of three days, fined up to NT$30,000 or sent to a correctional institution for a period of between 6 and 12 months.

Chen, who outlawed sex work in Taipei in 1997, was president from 2000 to 2008. During this time, sex workers were prosecuted and advocates like Josephine Ho also faced discrimination from conservative groups.

After a long public debate, Cheng Li-wun introduced a Bill in April 2009, to decriminalize sex work. In June 2009, in response to sex workers’ demands and academic research, and citing a commitment to bring Taiwan's legislation into harmony with the International Covenant on Civil and Political Rights and the International Covenant on Economic, Social and Cultural Rights, the Ma Ying-jeou administration announced that prostitution was to be decriminalized, according to Jiang Yi-huah, minister of the Research, Development and Evaluation Commission.

Announcing that Article 80 would be abolished, on the grounds of treating prostitution as a matter of human rights, the government concluded that punishing sexual transactions only forced them underground, leaving sex workers open to abuse. The government stated that while sexual transactions between consenting adults should be governed by personal, educational and religious considerations, rather than by laws, the sex trade should be regulated like any other occupation. The law was also felt to be largely ineffectual. It left the question of where people could engage in prostitution up to local governments. Regulations were promised within six months, which were to be mainly the responsibility of local government. In the meantime jail terms were to be replaced by fines, and police officers would no longer be credited for the arrest of sex workers.

=== Constitutional decision (2009) ===
Subsequent to this, the Constitutional Court declared the existing legislation unconstitutional, and ordered that it cease to be in effect within 2 years. Again government officials stated there were plans to decriminalize sex work. This was the first pronouncement by the Ministry of the Interior on the subject, but plans to allow local red-light districts were opposed by Taipei's Mayor Hau Lung-bin. However, in 2010 the government was still debating the subject.

In October 2010, the government announced it was planning to allow small brothels to operate, while meanwhile the laws were no longer being enforced. In May 2011, the government announced that a draft bill was imminent.

==== Response ====
Taiwan's approach created renewed hope for those advocating for more liberal policies in China. In Taiwan the public narrowly supported the initiative but it was opposed by some women's groups such as The Garden of Hope Foundation.

==== Legal status ====
Prostitution in Taiwan is illegal except in dedicated zones, known as "special sex zones", which have yet to be created. Foreign prostitutes caught by police are charged with prostitution rather than "illegal work by foreign national", which implies illegality.

In 2015, Taiwan busted a global escort prostitution ring.

== Sex trafficking ==
Taiwan is a destination for women subjected to sex trafficking. To a lesser extent, Taiwan is a source of women and children subjected to sex trafficking. Taiwanese women and children are subjected to domestic sex trafficking, including as part of an increasing trend in which traffickers induce and take advantage of Taiwanese and foreign victims’ drug addictions. Many child sex trafficking victims are from economically disadvantaged areas in Taiwan. Women from China and Southeast Asian countries are lured to Taiwan through fraudulent marriages and deceptive employment offers for purposes of sex trafficking. Traffickers in Taiwan are also increasingly utilizing smartphone apps and the internet to conduct their recruitment activity and to mask their identities from law enforcement.

The United States Department of State Office to Monitor and Combat Trafficking in Persons ranks Taiwan as a 'Tier 1' country.

== Sources ==
- Hwang, Shu-Ling; Bedford, Olwen (May 2003). "Precursors and Pathways to Adolescent Prostitution in Taiwan". Journal of Sex Research. 40 (2). Archived from the original on 22 November 2004 – via FindArticles.
- Huang HTM. State power, prostitution and sexual order in Taiwan: towards a genealogical critique of ‘Virtuous Custom’. Inter-Asia Cultural Studies 5(2) 2004 237-262
- MH. Selling bodies/selling pleasure: The social organisation of sex work in Taiwan, in Gangoli G, Westmarland N (eds.) International approaches to prostitution: law and policy in Europe and Asia, Policy press, Bristol 2006 pp 165-184
- Chun-ju Flora Hung. Relationship building, activism, and conflict resolution — A case study on the termination of licensed prostitution in Taipei City Asian Journal of Communication Volume 13, Issue 2 2003, pages 21 – 49
- Asia Monitor Resource Centre. Sex Work in Taiwan
