= Prostitution in Nicaragua =

Prostitution in Nicaragua is legal, but promoting prostitution and procuring are prohibited. The minimum age for prostitutes is 18 years old. It was estimated in 2015 that there were around 15,000 prostitutes in the country.

Prostitution is common in Managua. Prostitutes work on the streets, in nightclubs and bars, or in massage parlors.

Prostitutes are known locally as "zorras".

== History ==
From 1880 to 1927 there were no prostitution laws. Prostitutes, pimps and madams were charged with vagrancy. Prostitution was legalised and regulated from April 1927. Prostitutes has to register and have a weekly health check. Those who did not comply were fined by the police, or after 1933 the National Guard.

In August 1955 a law was passed prohibiting the promotion of prostitution. By then the national Guard had taken control of prostitution in the country. The only people jailed for controlling prostitution were those who wouldn't pay the required bribes.

Starting in the 1960s President Somoza's business empire moved into prostitution and gambling houses. The National Guard (who Somoza was the head of), through being bribed, ensured these establishments flourished. After Somoza was deposed in 1979 by the Sandinista National Liberation Front (FSLN)), one of their first actions was the destruction and burning of "a great number of brothels, bars and gambling houses". The FSLN had previously advocated the elimination of prostitution in its 1969 manifesto, but this was never enacted.

== Facilitadoras judiciales ==
Nicaragua became the first country to train sex workers to be official representatives of the government and the judicial system. In a pilot scheme, 16 sex workers were trained as "Facilitadoras judiciales" (judicial facilitators). This led to a further 60 sex workers being trained. The eventual aim is to have at least six sex workers trained in every municipality (153).

The scheme was organised by the Sunflowers Sex Workers’ Association and is part of a larger initiative that has trained 4,300 facilitators in the country. The scheme is endorsed by the Nicaraguan Judicial System. Vice-president Marvin Aguilar said "We are the only country in the world that treats sex workers as ‘judicial facilitators’. The only country in the world that does not try and arrest them, where the activity is not criminalized.”

The judicial facilitators have the following tasks:

- Help local judges in proceedings
- They disseminate civic-legal laws and regulations among the population
- Advise and accompany the population in judicial and administrative proceedings
- Carry out mediations in cases that the Law allows
- They send the corresponding authorities the cases that are not within their competence.

== HIV ==
With only 0.2 percent of the adult population estimated to be HIV-positive, Nicaragua has one of the lowest HIV prevalence rates in Central America. HIV was first detected in Nicaragua in 1987, after concentrated epidemics had been reported in other Central American nations. The onset of the epidemic was likely delayed by Nicaragua's 10-year civil war and the U.S.-led economic blockade, both of which left the country isolated for several years. Relative control over commercial sex work, low infection rates among injecting drug users, and a ban on the commercial sale of blood also slowed HIV transmission.

A September 2005 study on HIV among commercial sex workers reported by UNAIDS demonstrated a prevalence of only 0.2 percent in that group. This had increased to 2.6% in 2016.

== Child Prostitution ==
Child prostitution is widespread, particularly in Managua, port cities, along the Honduran and Costa Rican borders, and near highways.

The law permits juveniles 14 years of age or older to engage in prostitution. According to Casa Alianza, between 1,200 and 1,500 girls and young women work in the brothels of Managua, and almost half are under the age of 18. Every night, hundreds of teenage girls line the Masaya Highway commercial corridor on the capital's south side. Street children engage in prostitution, often to support a drug habit.

Nicaragua is a destination for child sex tourists from the United States, Canada, and Western Europe. The law imposes a penalty of five to seven years' imprisonment for convicted sex tourism offenders.

== Sex trafficking ==
Nicaragua is principally a source and transit country for women, and children subjected to sex trafficking. Nicaraguan women and children are subjected to sex trafficking within the country and in other Central American countries, Mexico, and the United States. Many trafficking victims are recruited in rural areas or border regions with false promises of high-paying jobs in urban centres and tourist locales, where they are subjected to sex trafficking. Victims’ family members are often complicit in their exploitation, and traffickers have reportedly increased recruitment activity on social media sites. Nicaraguan women and children are subjected to sex trafficking in the RAAN and RAAS, where the lack of strong law enforcement institutions and a higher crime rate increase the vulnerability of the local population.

Nicaraguans from Northern-Central departments who migrate to other Central American countries and Europe are reportedly vulnerable to sextrafficking. During the reporting period, Nicaraguans were reported as among the primary nationalities of victims identified in Guatemala. In addition, children left by these migrants in Nicaragua reportedly become vulnerable to sex trafficking.

The United States Department of State Office to Monitor and Combat Trafficking in Persons ranks Nicaragua as a Tier 2 Watch List country.
