= Prostitution in Macau =

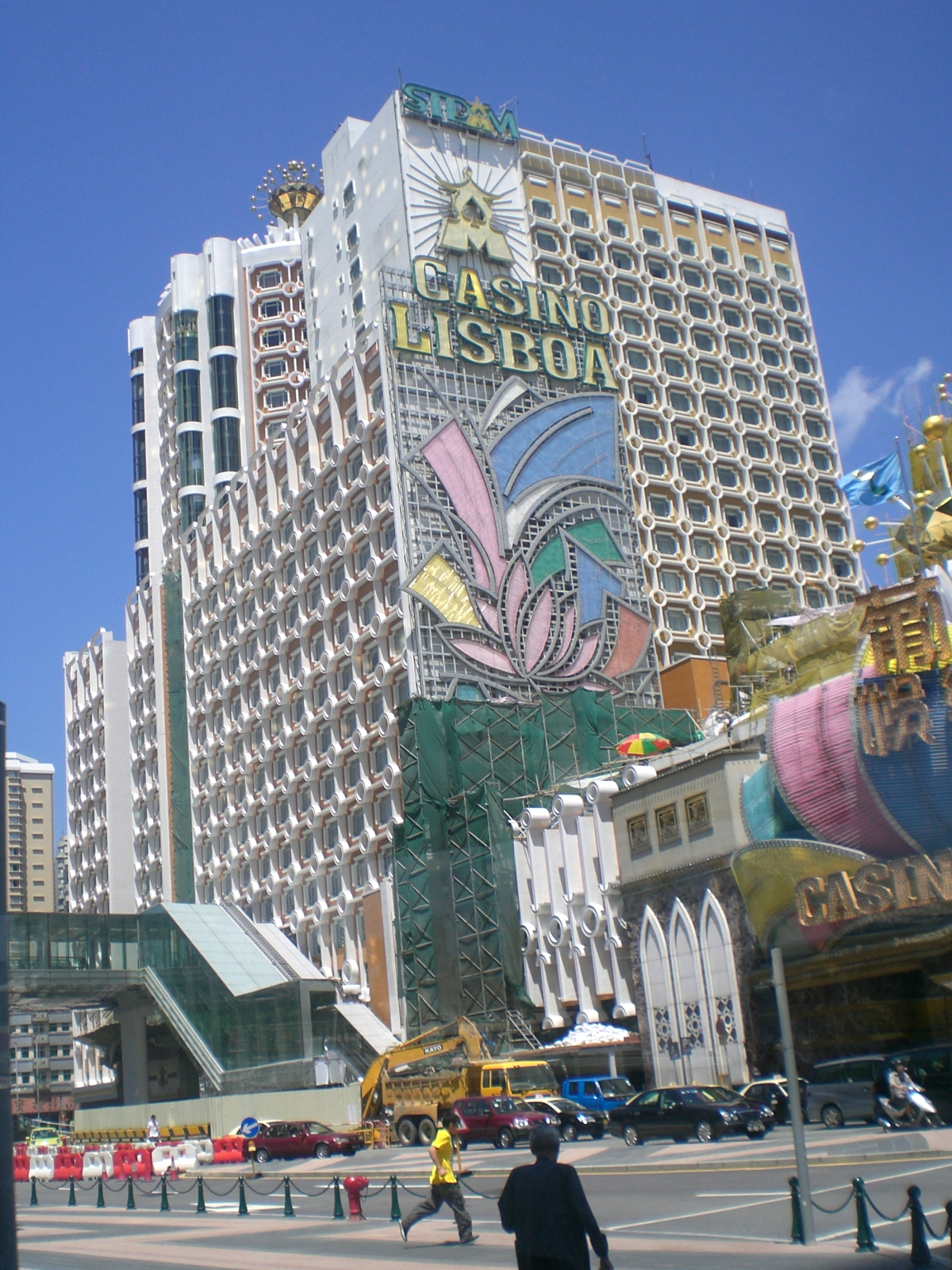
Casino Lisboa, Macau. "Scores of legally tolerated prostitutes, many of whom live in the casino's hotel, circle the Lisboa's public areas."

Prostitution is legal in Macau unlike in mainland China, because the city is a special administrative region of the country. However, operating a brothel and procuring are both illegal in Macau, with the latter punishable by a maximum jail sentence of 8 years. Street prostitution is illegal but sex work in a massage parlor is considered to be de facto legal. The city has a large sex trade despite there being no official red-light district. In addition to street prostitution, prostitutes work in low-rent buildings, massage parlours and illegal brothels, and the casinos, nightclubs, saunas and some of the larger hotels. Most hotels, however, have suspected prostitutes removed from the premises. Many of the city's sidewalks and underpasses are littered with prostitutes' calling cards.

Macau's economy is based largely on tourism with significant input from gambling casinos, drugs and prostitution which has led to the city being called a Sin City. As the Macau administration relies heavily on taxes from prostitution and gambling, the authorities have traditionally been reluctant to reduce the size of the sex industry. The trade is said to be controlled by Chinese organized crime groups with different gangs made up of people from different provinces in China, a system which has led to violent clashes.

== History ==
Prostitution was recorded in Macau during the 19th and 20th centuries. In the nineteenth century, in addition to conventional brothels, Macau had floating brothels known as "flower boats" which serviced foreign ships. After 1851 prostitution was regulated, and in the 1930s the government attempted to end the exploitation and abuse of prostitutes. In the late 1930s there were 120 brothels in the city with 1500 prostitutes.

In the 1990s there were reports alleging that Chinese triad members were arranging marriages of convenience with Portuguese prostitutes in order to secure Portuguese citizenship. In early 2015 there were tabloid reports of popular Japanese pornographic film actresses coming to Macau to work as prostitutes; their clients were said to be rich Chinese men. A subsequent Chinese national anti-corruption drive has reduced prostitution-related advertising and increased the number of inspections of illegal brothels. Some underground brothels have been shut down and over 100 people were arrested in connection with criminal involvement in prostitution at a Macau hotel.

== Sex trafficking ==
Syndicates from China are said to lure women from mainland China to work as prostitutes in Macau with false advertisements for casino jobs, work as dancers, or other types of legitimate employment. There are also allegations that women are trafficked to Macau for prostitution from Mongolia, Russia, Philippines, Thailand, Vietnam, Burma, Central Asia and South Africa. A gang bringing South Korean prostitutes to Macau to serve Chinese men was arrested in 2015. According to the United States embassy in Ulaanbaatar, estimates of Mongolian sex workers in Macau vary from 200-300 women. Macau has been put on a U.S. State Department watch list for human trafficking, ranked at Tier 2 (territories which do not fully comply with minimum standards in the Victims of Trafficking and Violence Protection Act of 2000 “but are making significant efforts to bring themselves into compliance”). Human trafficking is illegal in Macau, with a maximum jail sentence of 12 years (15 years if minors are involved).

The United States Department of State Office to Monitor and Combat Trafficking in Persons ranks Macau as a 'Tier 2 Watch List' territory.

== See also ==
- Prostitution in China
- Prostitution in Hong Kong
- Prostitution in Tibet
