= Prostitution in Guinea-Bissau =

Prostitution in Guinea-Bissau is common and there are no prostitution laws. In 2016 it was estimated there were 3,138 prostitutes in the country. Often it is associated with other crimes: Many pimps are also reported to be drug dealers. Poverty leads many women to be tempted into prostitution and cocaine addiction.

Many of the prostitutes in Bissau and other towns in Guinea-Bissau are Manjako women from Caio in the Cacheu Region. They tend to be over 30 and wait in designated rooms in their houses for clients. Occasionally they will go to a local bar in search of clients. Prostitutes from Caio also travel to Ziguinchor in Senegal and Banjul in The Gambia to work.

Younger prostitutes in the cities often work in bars.

There have been reports of child sex tourism on the Bissagos Islands.

== HIV ==
Like other countries in Sub-Saharan Africa, HIV is a problem in the country. Adult prevalence is 3.1%

Condom use amongst sex workers is irregular, which has led to an HIV prevalence amongst sex workers of 39%.

== Child prostitution ==
Child prostitution is a problem in the country. Many children engage in prostitution for survival. The activity mainly takes place in clubs, bars and hotels. The government takes little action, relying on NGOs to try and address the problem.

Around 2000-2004 there have been reports of child sex tourism on the Bissagos Islands.

== Sex trafficking ==
Guinea-Bissau is a source country for children subjected to sex trafficking. The extent to which adults are subjected to forced prostitution is unclear. Bissau-Guinean girls are subjected to child sex trafficking in Guinea and Senegal.

The United States Department of State Office to Monitor and Combat Trafficking in Persons ranks Guinea-Bissau as a Tier 2 Watch List country.
