= Prostitution in South Sudan =

Prostitution in South Sudan is legal but related activities such as soliciting or brothel-keeping are illegal.

Since independence from Sudan in July 2011, prostitution has expanded considerably, mainly due to an influx of prostitutes from nearby African countries. In the capital, Juba, the number of prostitutes rose from a few thousand at the time of independence to an estimated 10,000 in 2014. Juba has a large percentage of foreign residents including aid workers and UN personnel. Many of these are single men, or married men living away from home. Their relative wealth has attracted women and girls from within South Sudan and also from Kenya, Congo, Uganda, and Khartoum.

Sex workers are subject to police harassment and brutality.

Sex trafficking, child prostitution and HIV are problems in the country.

== HIV ==
Due to long periods of war (Second Sudanese Civil War and South Sudanese Civil War), HIV prevention campaigns have lagged behind other African countries. Data about HIV in the country is sparse, but estimates of HIV prevalence are 2.6% amongst adults and 21% amongst sex workers, although UNAIDS warn this may increase to an epidemic within 10 years if the issue is not addressed adequately.

Lack of awareness, shortage of condoms, clients’ reluctance to use condoms when available, and limited access to healthcare are all factors in the spread of HIV amongst sex workers and their clients. In 2014, sex workers called on the government to promote safe sex.

== Child prostitution ==
Child prostitution is a problem in the country, especially in Juba. Many of the girls are trafficked, some from within South Sudan, others from Eritrea, Ethiopia, and Somalia. In Juba there were an estimated 3,000 street children in 2014, of which around 500 girls are thought to be involved in prostitution.

== Sex trafficking ==
South Sudan is a source and destination country for men, women, and children subjected to sex trafficking. South Sudanese women and girls, particularly those from rural areas or who are internally displaced, are forced to engage in commercial sex acts. South Sudanese girls are subjected to sex trafficking in restaurants, hotels, and brothels in urban centres, at times with the involvement of corrupt law enforcement officials. Girls are forced into marriages, at times as compensation for inter-ethnic killings; some may be subsequently subjected to sexual slavery. South Sudanese and foreign business owners recruit men and women from regional countries, especially Eritrea, Ethiopia, and Somalia, as well as South Sudanese women and children, with fraudulent offers of employment opportunities in hotels, restaurants, and construction; many are subjected to sex trafficking. Authorities occasionally assisted traffickers in crossing international borders, and some South Sudanese officials purchased sex from child trafficking victims, facilitated child sex trafficking, or protected establishments that exploited victims in the sex trade.

Violent conflict increased the number of internally displaced people to 1.9 million and the number of refugees in neighbouring states to nearly 1.5 million. The UN-estimated 20,000 unaccompanied minors in refugee camps or moving between camps, particularly while crossing the Kenya-South Sudan and Democratic Republic of the Congo-South Sudan border, were vulnerable to abduction for sex trafficking. Inter-ethnic abductions, as well as abductions by external criminal elements, continued between some communities in South Sudan, especially in Jonglei, Unity, and Upper Nile states. In previous years, abduction was also pervasive in Warrap, Northern Bahr el-Ghazal, and Lakes states. Some abductees were subjected to sex trafficking.

The United States Department of State Office to Monitor and Combat Trafficking in Persons ranks South Sudan as a Tier 3 country.

== See also ==
- Prostitution in Sudan
