= Prostitution in Samoa =

Prostitution in Samoa is illegal but is commonly practised. In 2009, an investigation by the Samoan Observer newspaper identified that prostitution was taking place on the islands. A study carried out in 2016 by the United Nations Development Programme, UNICEF and the University of New South Wales indicated that there were approximately 400 female sex workers in Samoa, serving local and foreign clients. This equates to 1 in every 140 of the adult women on the island. The primary reason for women doing sex work was economic; some starting sex work as early as 13 years old. In February 2017, Samoa Police prepared to launch an investigation into a foreign-owned business alleged to be using local women in a prostitution operation. In the same year the Ministry of Health put forward plans to offer counselling and educational services to sex workers as part of the National HIV, AIDS, and STI Policy 2017-2022.

== Legal situation ==
Prostitution is illegal in Samoa under the Crimes Act 2013. Samoan law also prohibits anyone from living on the earnings of a prostitute, for which the maximum penalty is ten years' imprisonment. Procuring and brothelkeeping are also illegal, with the latter subject to a maximum of ten years' imprisonment.

=== Legislation ===
The provisions of the Crimes Act 2013 in relation to prostitution are:

- Article 62. Using threats of intimidation for the purpose of sexual conduct - Maximum penalty 5 years imprisonment
- Article 70. Brothel keeping - Maximum 10 years
- Article 72. Prostitution - Maximum 3 years
- Article 73. Solicitation - Maximum 5 years
- Article 74. Living on earnings of prostitution - Maximum 10 years
- Article 75. Procuring sexual intercourse - Maximum 7 years

== History ==
In the 19th century, the fishing village of Apia grew into a port in which ships of many nations stopped. Prostitution grew in the harbour area to such an extent that in 1892, Robert Louis Stevenson wrote "the white people of Apia lay in the worst squalor of degradation". The town was also known as “little Cairo” and “hell in the Pacific”. Many of the prostitutes were "half-caste". In 1893, the Reverend John William Hill proposed building a hospital for diseased prostitutes.

During the Second World War, the number of American troops on the island caused a large spike in prostitution. The entrance gates at the airport were known by Samoans as “the gates of sin." One matai (chief) was expelled from his village for suspicion of procuring prostitutes for the Americans.

== Sex trafficking ==
The United States Department of State reported that in 2016 there were no confirmed reports that the country was a source, destination, or transit country for victims of sex trafficking.
