= Prostitution in Hawaii =

Prostitution in Hawaii is illegal but common. There are about 150 brothels in Oahu alone.

== Legal situation ==
Under Hawaii Revised Statutes section 712-1200, both the buying and selling of sex are illegal, and also related activities such as soliciting, promoting prostitution and allowing premises to be used for prostitution, are prohibited. The penalty is a fine of up to US$500 and/or up to 30 days imprisonment.

It was legal for Law Enforcement Officers to have sex with prostitutes if they were 'collecting evidence' of prostitution. A new law in 2014 outlawed this practice.

A Bill was put before Hawaii's state government in January 2017, with the intent of decriminalising prostitution. On the second reading in February 2017 it was referred to the "House Committee on Judiciary" for further investigation and the case was adjourned sine die.

== History ==
Prior to European contact, there was no prostitution on the islands. Polygamy was common and there was no need for prostitutes. Once European sailors started to come to the island and offered money or goods for sex to the native women, prostitution started. The dock area of Iwilei grew into a red-light district.

A law was passed in 1835 that prohibited "illicit connections," including prostitution. This was soon followed by a "Law Respecting Lewdness". In 1860, the "Act to Mitigate the Evils and diseases arising from Prostitution" was passed. It required registration and periodic medical examinations for prostitutes.

By the 1900s, Iwilei had become a closed stockade, its 5 entrances controlled by police. Inside there were brightly coloured houses where the prostitutes worked. Many of the prostitutes were Japanese. In 1898 there were 26 Hawaiian, 5 half-caste, 8 French, 2 British, 1 American and 115 Japanese prostitutes registered. Iwilei lasted until May 1917, when it was closed down due to pressure from moralists.

The "bawdy houses" soon set up in Chinatown. An era of unofficial regulation followed, which was endorsed by the US military. There were struggles between the police and military, neither wanting to be seen as being in charge of the red-light district.

=== World War II ===
During the early 1940s the area served 250,000 men per month, at a fixed fee of $3. On August 28, 1942, the prostitutes of Hotel Street (the main street of the red-light district) went on strike for better conditions and the right to work away from the brothels. The strike lasted 22 days.

The best-known prostitute of the period was Jean O'Hara. She is credited with inventing the "bull pen" system where a single prostitute would work three rooms in rotation: In one room a man would be undressing, in a second room the prostitute would be having sex, and in the third room the man would be dressing. With price controls circumventing the laws of supply and demand, O'Hara's system sped up the process and allowed each prostitute to see many more 'johns' every day. O'Hara later wrote her memoirs in My Life as a Honolulu Prostitute.

Following pressure from various groups, Hawaii's Governor, Ingram Stainback, ordered the closure of the red-light district. On September 21, 1944, all the houses of prostitution were ordered to close.

== Sex trafficking ==
Hawaii is a source, destination and transit location for sex trafficking. Women from China, Japan, Korea, Thailand, Russia and parts of Eastern Europe are trafficked to the island and forced into prostitution. Many are moved on to cities on the American mainland after a few months. Hawaiian women and girls are vulnerable to sex trafficking.

In 2017 a Chinese national was convicted of trafficking. He brought in Chinese women to work in the Mayflower and Empire Relax massage parlors in Honolulu. He also trafficked women to work in massage parlors in New York City. The Chinese owner of the Mayflower was convicted of attempting to bribe Federal Bureau of Investigation agents. Both faced deportation.

In January 2018, an American male was charged with prostitution and sex trafficking offences. He had "recruited, enticed, harbored, transported, provided, obtained, advertised, maintained, patronized, and solicited" by force and threats.
