= Prostitution in Sierra Leone =

Prostitution in Sierra Leone is legal and commonplace. Soliciting and 3rd party involvement are prohibited by the Sexual Offences Act 2012. UNAIDS estimate there are 240,000 prostitutes in the country. They are known locally as 'serpents' because of the hissing noise they use to attract clients.

Sex workers report they are often abused, harassed and suffer extortion by the police.

In 1787 the British Crown founded a settlement in Sierra Leone in what was called the "Province of Freedom". It intended to resettle some of the "Black Poor of London," mostly African Americans freed by the British during the American Revolutionary War. About 290 free black men, 41 black women and 60 white prostitutes from London reached Sierra Leone on 15 May 1787.

Since the end of the ten-year civil war in Sierra Leone, there has been an increase in child prostitution, especially among children who are struggling to survive. This has happened in spite of the fact that child prostitution is illegal in the country.

== Sex trafficking ==
Sierra Leone is a source and destination country for men, women, and children subjected to sex trafficking. Victims originate largely from rural provinces and are recruited to urban and mining centers for exploitation in sex trafficking. At times, sex trafficking occurs on beaches and in nightclubs. Trafficking victims are also exploited in fishing and agriculture and subjected to sex trafficking through customary practices, such as forced marriages. Traffickers typically operate individually, convincing parents to hand over their children and promising to provide an education or better life but instead exploiting the children in trafficking. Sierra Leonean girls are increasingly exploited in Guinea. Traffickers have exploited boys and girls from Sierra Leone to reportedly work as “cultural dancers”—and possibly also for sexual exploitation—in The Gambia. Sierra Leonean adults voluntarily migrate to other West African countries, including Mauritania and Guinea, as well as to the Middle East and Europe, where some are subjected to forced prostitution. As in previous years, Sierra Leonean women are subjected to trafficking in Kuwait and Lebanon. Children from neighboring West African countries have been exploited in prostitution in Sierra Leone.

The 2005 anti-trafficking law criminalizes all forms of human trafficking and prescribes a maximum penalty of 10 years imprisonment and/or a fine of 50 million leones ($6,710) for sex trafficking. In addition, two other laws prescribe penalties for sex trafficking offenses that differ from the anti-trafficking law. The Child Rights Act imposes a penalty for the prostitution of a child by a third party of 30 million leones ($4,030) and/or two years imprisonment, which is neither sufficiently stringent nor commensurate with penalties for rape. The Sexual Offences Act criminalizes forced prostitution and child prostitution with penalties of up to 15 years imprisonment.

The United States Department of State Office to Monitor and Combat Trafficking in Persons ranks Sierra Leone as a 'Tier 2 Watch List' country.
