= Prostitution in Papua New Guinea =

Prostitution in Papua New Guinea is generally regarded as illegal but widely practiced with the laws rarely enforced. Prostitution occurs on the streets, in bars, brothels and in logging, mining, and palm oil areas. In 2010 it was estimated there were 2.000 prostitutes in the capital, Port Moresby. The drought in 2016 caused a rise in prostitution. Many of the women have turned to sex work due to poverty or unemployment.

HIV, sex trafficking and child prostitution are common problems in Papua New Guinea.

== Legal situation ==
The legal situation in Papua New Guinea is complex. The Summary Offences Act 1977 makes keeping a brothel and living on the earnings of prostitution offences. The idea of the law was to decriminalise prostitution but criminalise those who sought to exploit or profit from it. In 1978, a Papua New Guinea court interpreted ‘living on the earnings of prostitution’ to include 'profit from one's own prostitution'. (Wemay v Tumdual) The ruling effectively made all prostitution illegal. In a further case it was ruled that "occasional transactional sex for small amounts of money was insufficient to warrant a conviction". This may be a unique legal situation in that prostitution is made illegal not by Statute law but by case law.

In rural areas, 'customary law' is also in force. These laws are not written down, but are based on the knowledge of the laws of the indigenous peoples.

There have been calls to legalise prostitution. In October 2016, a private member's Bill was introduced to Parliament by the Member for Sumkar, Ken Fairweather, to instigate legalisation. Prime Minister Peter O'Neill and Oro Governor Gary Juffa said they would oppose any call for legalisation.

== Law enforcement ==
Law enforcement is inconsistent. Sex workers and NGOs report corruption amongst police. There also report violence, intimidation, abuse, extortion and rape at the hands of the police. Knowingly transmitting HIV contrary to the HIV/AIDS Management and Prevention Act (HAMP) Act 2003 is sometimes used to detain sex workers, but there is no evidence of any charges being brought under this legislation.

== HIV ==
The country has the highest HIV prevalence in the Pacific. Sex workers are one of the high risk groups, although HIV response in the country is now being directed towards the high risk groups. Access to healthcare is poor for sex workers. UNAIDS estimated an HIV prevalence of 17.8% amongst sex workers in 2016.

in 2026, sex workers still report health and social challenged regarding their work, particularly in regarding the spread of HIV. Sex workers are often offered higher payment for unprotected sex, which increases their vulnerability to HIV infection. The country declared an HIV crisis in 2025 following a sharp rise in infections, with tens of thousands of people living with the virus and ongoing gaps in testing and treatment. Marginalised groups, including transgender sex workers, are particularly at risk and frequently encounter stigma and discrimination in healthcare settings, although this remains contested by government officials.

== Sex trafficking ==
Papua New Guinea is a source, transit, and destination country for women, and children subjected to sex trafficking. Foreign and local women and children are subjected to sex trafficking, including near logging, mining, and palm oil sites. “Mosko Girls”, young girls employed in bars to provide companionship to patrons and sell an alcoholic drink called mosko, are vulnerable to human trafficking, especially around major cities. Within the country, children and women from rural areas are deceived, often by relatives, with promises of legitimate work or education to travel to different provinces where they are subjected to sex trafficking. NGOs report some parents receive money from traffickers who exploited their teenage daughters in prostitution, including near mining and logging sites. Children, including girls as young as 5 years old from remote rural areas, are reportedly subjected to sex trafficking by members of their immediate family or tribe. Tribal leaders reportedly trade with each other the service of girls and women for guns and to forge political alliances.

Young girls sold into polygamous marriages may be exploited in prostitution. In urban areas, parents reportedly exploit their children in sex trafficking directly or in brothels as a means to support their families or to pay for school fees. Government officials reportedly facilitate trafficking by accepting bribes to allow undocumented migrants to enter the country or ignore trafficking situations, and some may exploit sex trafficking victims or procure victims for other individuals in return for political favours or votes.

Malaysian and Chinese logging companies arrange for some foreign women to enter the country voluntarily with fraudulently issued tourist or business visas. After their arrival, many of these women, from countries including Indonesia, Malaysia, Thailand, China, and the Philippines, are turned over to traffickers who transport them to logging and mining camps, fisheries, and entertainment sites, and exploit them in forced prostitution.

The United States Department of State Office to Monitor and Combat Trafficking in Persons ranks Papua New Guinea as a "Tier 3" country.
