= Prostitution in Jordan =

Prostitution in Jordan is technically illegal, but in practice, tolerated, with authorities turning a blind eye to the act. Prostitution occurs mainly in the larger cities in their poor neighbourhoods. It occurs in brothels, restaurants, night clubs and on the streets. The prostitutes are mainly from Russia, Ukraine, the Philippines, Morocco, Tunisia, Syria, Iraq as well as Jordanians.

Red-light districts are rare in the country, although most cities have "cruising areas". In the neighborhood of Jubaiha (al-jubaiha:الجبيهة), in the capital, Amman, one of the major streets has been commonly called "Tallaini Street" meaning "the pick me up street". Local residents have tried to stop prostitution in the area.

In 2007, in an attempt to limit the number of prostitutes in Jordan, Jordan's Ministry of Interior announced a special visa scheme for women aged 17–40 travelling alone from Ukraine, Estonia, Russia, Bulgaria, Moldova, Tunisia, Algeria, Morocco, Belarus, Uzbekistan and Armenia. Protests from the tourist industry resulted in the scheme being withdrawn.

Jordan is known for sex tourism within the Middle East. Instances of female sex tourism with Bedouin men have been reported at tourist sites in the Jordanian desert.

Some Syrian refugees in Jordan have been reported to be working as prostitutes, including in the Zaatari refugee camp.

== History ==
During the era of slavery in Jordan, prostitution was connected to slavery. The Islamic Law formally prohibited prostitution. However, since the principle of concubinage in Islam in Islamic Law allowed a man to have intercourse with his female slave, prostitution was practiced by a pimp selling his female slave on the slave market to a client, who was allowed to have intercourse with her as her new owner, and who after intercourse returned his ownership of her to her pimp on the pretext of discontent, which was a legal and accepted method for prostitution in the Islamic world. Slavery in Jordan was however abolished in 1929.

== Sex trafficking ==
Jordan is a source and destination country for adults and children subjected to sex trafficking. Trafficking victims in Jordan are primarily from South and Southeast Asia, East Africa, Egypt, and Syria. Syrian refugees in Jordan continue to be highly vulnerable to trafficking. There have been reported cases of Syrian refugee women and girls sold into "temporary" or forced marriages to Jordanians and men from the Persian Gulf for the purpose of forced commercial sex. For example, in 2016 the government reported a case involving three Syrian girls and one Syrian woman who were forced by their father into temporary marriages—for the purpose of sexual exploitation—with a national from Saudi Arabia. Syrian, Lebanese, North African, and Eastern European women may be forced into prostitution after migrating to Jordan to work in restaurants and nightclubs; some Jordanian women working in nightclubs may also be forced into prostitution. As reported by an NGO in 2016, some Egyptian women are forced into prostitution by their Jordanian husbands. Some out-of-status domestic workers from Indonesia, the Philippines, Bangladesh, and Sri Lanka have been reportedly forced into prostitution after fleeing their employers.

The 2009 anti-human trafficking law criminalizes all forms of sex and labor trafficking. Penalties for sex trafficking and forced labor of adults are a minimum of six months imprisonment and/or a fine ranging from 1,000-5,000 Jordanian Dinars ($1,410-$7,060).

The United States Department of State Office to Monitor and Combat Trafficking in Persons ranks Jordan as a 'Tier 2' country.
