= Prostitution in Iraq =

Prostitution in Iraq is illegal. The Iraqi penal code outlaws prostitution, with the pimp, the prostitute and the client all being liable for criminal penalties. Punishment can be severe, including life imprisonment.

== History ==
During the era of slavery in Ottoman Iraq (1534–1920), prostitution was connected to slavery. The Islamic Law formally prohibited prostitution. However, since the principle of concubinage in Islam in Islamic Law allowed a man to have intercourse with his female slave, prostitution was practiced by a pimp selling his female slave on the slave market to a client, who was allowed to have intercourse with her as her new owner, and who after intercourse returned his ownership of her to her pimp on the pretext of discontent, which was a legal and accepted method for prostitution for centuries in the Islamic world.

== Iraq war ==
Many women fleeing the war in Iraq have been forced into prostitution. Some sources claim up to fifty thousand Iraqi refugee women in Syria, many of them widows or orphans, have been forced into prostitution. Sources claim the women are exploited by Arab states of the Persian Gulf. After the American invasion of Iraq in 2003, private contracting companies used foreign prostitutes smuggled into bases and the Green Zone as bribery for other contracts.

== Kurdistan Region ==
The Kurdistan region has reportedly received "women and children trafficked from the rest of Iraq for prostitution". Criminal gangs may have prostituted girls from outside of the Kurdistan Region in the provinces of Erbil, Duhok, and Slemani. NGOs have alleged that some personnel from the Kurdistan Regional Government's Asayish internal security forces have facilitated prostitution in Syrian refugee camps in the Kurdistan Region. Iraqi women were sold into “temporary marriages” and Syrian girls from refugee camps in the Kurdistan Region were forced into early or “temporary marriages”, and it was alleged that Kurdistan region's authorities ignored such cases.

== Prostitutes invade Kirkuk ==
Soran Mama Hama, a young reporter for Livin Magazine wrote an article entitled "Prostitutes invade Kirkuk", which was published on 15 June 2008. Hama said that he had the names of police brigadiers, many lieutenants, colonels, and many police and security officers involved in and covering up a prostitution network in Kirkuk. The network involved 200 brothels in the city, each with 2–6 prostitutes.

The Kurdistan Journalists Syndicate (KJS) said Mama Hama had received a threatening message from an unidentified person on 15 May.

Hama was shot and killed in front of his home in Kirkuk on 21 July. In the mobile phone Hama was using, there were messages discovered to be from a PUK politician who had threatened him with death prior to his assassination.

== Other types of prostitution ==
In some cases, Iraqi teenage boys and young men are the prostitutes. In these cases the prostitutes are typically motivated by poverty and are mostly heterosexual.

== Sex trafficking ==
Iraq is a source and destination country for women and children subjected to sex trafficking. The violent conflict with ISIS exacerbated the population's vulnerability to trafficking, in particular women and children. Refugees and IDPs face heightened risk of trafficking due to their economic and social vulnerability and lack of security and protections. NGOs report trafficking networks in the Kurdistan Region target refugees and IDPs, operating with assistance from local officials, including judges, officials from the Asayish forces, and border agents. In 2015, members of the Kurdistan Region Parliament and NGOs reported some personnel from the Asayish forces facilitated the sex trafficking of women and girls in Syrian refugee camps in the Kurdistan Region, primarily in Domiz refugee camp, as well as sex trafficking of girls outside of the camps. In 2016, NGOs reported Asayish guards not only allowed men to enter a camp to solicit commercial sex with refugee girls, but the guards also solicited sex from the refugee girls, including granting them permission to leave the camp in exchange for sex. Reports from 2015 indicated IDPs and some Syrian refugee women were forced into prostitution by a trafficking network in hotels and brothels in Baghdad, Basrah, and other cities in southern Iraq after agents of the network promised to resettle them from the Kurdistan Region.

Reports continue to suggest some Iraqi law enforcement officials have allegedly frequented brothels known for sex trafficking or accepted bribes to allow sex trafficking. Media and other observers reported in 2015 that an Iranian sex trafficking network operated brothels in Erbil where Afghan girls were exploited in commercial sex; the media reported a KRG official allegedly paid $3,000 for an Afghan sex trafficking victim. There were anecdotal reports, including from a June 2016 local television station, of child sex trafficking of girls primarily from Iraq and Syria, as well as some from the Kurdistan Region, in Sulaymaniyah. NGOs also report cases in which girls who have run away from their families out of fear of honor killings are exploited in commercial sex by criminal networks.

Women primarily from Iran, China, and the Philippines are forced into prostitution in Iraq.

The United States Department of State Office to Monitor and Combat Trafficking in Persons ranks Iraq as a 'Tier 2 Watch List' country.
