= Prostitution in Greece =

Prostitution in Greece is legal and regulated at the age of 18. It is estimated that fewer than 1,000 women are legally employed as prostitutes and approximately 20,000 women, half of whom are of foreign origin and the other half are Greek, are engaged in illegal prostitution. Many women affected by the economic crisis have turned to prostitution through poverty.

== Legal situation ==
People legally engaged in prostitution may only work in brothels which have official permits. The women must be over 18; unmarried; have the right to live and work in Greece; be free from STIs; not suffer from mental illness; not have a drug addiction; and not have been convicted of homicide, pimping, child pornography, trafficking, robbery or blackmail. They must carry a medical card that is updated every two weeks.

Greek authorities decided to implement a 1999 law which stipulates that all brothels must have permits. Permits are issued by the state, usually to older women. Many of these women are former prostitutes. Brothels must be at least 200 m (656 ft) from public buildings. It was proposed this should be reduced to 100m ahead of the 2004 Athens Olympics but the Greek government did not act on the proposal.

Solicitation is illegal, but common, although the number of street prostitutes is decreasing. Pimping and procuring are illegal.

== HIV ==
Between 2011 and 2015, HIV infections increased 200% in Greece. In April 2012, after the HIV rate had increased 60% in one year, the authorities in Athens arrested many drug addicts and prostitutes (on charges of intentionally attempting to inflict serious bodily harm by allegedly having unprotected sex with customers) and conducted compulsory testing for HIV on these individuals. The media were complicit in the crack-down and published names and photographs of those who were HIV positive after the Greek authorities released the information. This action made sex workers wary of getting tested in case their names were published if they tested positive.

Condom use between sex workers and clients is low (estimated to be 4.7% by UNAIDS). This increases the risk of HIV and other STIs being transmitted.

== Sex trafficking ==
Greece is a destination, transit, and, to a very limited extent, source country for women and children subjected to sex trafficking. Traffickers subject some women and children from Eastern and Southern Europe, South and Central Asia, China, Georgia, Nigeria, and Russia to sex trafficking in unlicensed brothels, on the street, in strip clubs, in massage salons, and in hotels. The increase in unaccompanied child migrants in Greece has increased the number of children susceptible to exploitation. Some public officials have been investigated for suspected involvement in human trafficking.

Law 3064/2002 and Presidential Decree 233/2003 prohibit both sex trafficking and forced labour and prescribe punishments of up to 10 years imprisonment. Police investigated 18 sex trafficking cases in 2015 (26 in 2015). The government prosecuted 25 defendants for sex trafficking in 2016 (97 in 2015). The government has increased victim protection efforts. Police identified 26 sex trafficking victims, including five children, compared to 34 in 2015.

During 2016, Greece continued to experience a wave of migration from the Middle East, Africa, and South Asia, consisting of a mix of asylum-seekers, potential refugees, economic migrants, and populations vulnerable to trafficking, among others. One international organisation estimated Greece received more than 170,000 migrants and asylum-seekers in 2016; some of these individuals, such as unaccompanied children and single women, are highly vulnerable to trafficking. Unaccompanied children, primarily from Afghanistan, engage in survival sex and are vulnerable to trafficking. Recruiters target migrants in refugee camps from their own countries. Most migrants and asylum-seekers are believed to rely on smugglers at some point during their journey and in some instances are forced into exploitation upon arrival in Greece.

The United States Department of State Office to Monitor and Combat Trafficking in Persons stated that: "The Government of Greece does not fully meet the minimum standards for the elimination of trafficking but is making significant efforts to do so. The government demonstrated overall increasing efforts compared with the previous reporting period; therefore, Greece remained on Tier 2.

== History ==
The Regulation System was introduced in Greece after the Greek War of Independence and the foundation of the Kingdom of Greece.

The System was informally practiced from 1834 onward, when prostitutes were allowed to work in special neighborhoods in some public localities such as hotels, in exchange for registration with the police and monthly heakth controls: it was formally introduced in 1856.

The diakanonistikon Regulation System was abolished in Greece in 1955.

== See also ==
- Prostitution in ancient Greece
