= Prostitution in Guyana =

Prostitution in Guyana is illegal but widespread. Prostitution law is antiquated and dates from the colonial era. Law enforcement is inconsistent and sex workers report violence and abuse by the police. Many turn to prostitution for economic reasons and the lack of other job opportunities. Prostitution continues to receive greater public attention due to the high incidence of HIV/AIDS among prostitutes. Prostitution in the country is separated into three types: "uptown", servicing affluent clients, "downtown", servicing the working classes, and mining sites. UNAIDS estimate there to be 6,000 prostitutes in the country.

Prostitutes often rent rooms in hotels and attract clients in the hotel's bar or outside the hotel. Dancers in lap dancing and striptease establishments sometimes offer sexual services as a sideline.

In the capital, Georgetown, prostitutes sometimes visit moored freighters, with the captain's permission, to service the crews.

== Legal situation ==
Prostitution is not specifically prohibited by Guyanese law, but "common nuisance" in section 356 of the Criminal Law (Offences) Act of 1893 is interpreted to include prostitution. Section 357 makes it illegal to keep or manage a "common bawdy house" (brothel)

Title 26 - Nuisances, Bawdy Houses

356. Everyone who commits any common nuisance which endangers the lives, safety or health of the public, or which injures the person of any individual, shall be guilty of a misdemeanour and liable to imprisonment for two years.
357. Everyone who -

(a) keeps or manages a common bawdy house; or
(b) keeps or manages a common ill-governed or disorderly house;

shall be guilty of a misdemeanour and liable to imprisonment for two years.
— Criminal Law (Offences) Act (No. 18 of 1893)

The Combating Trafficking of Persons Act of 2005 prohibits all forms of trafficking and prescribes sufficiently stringent penalties ranging from three years to life imprisonment.

=== Calls for decriminalization ===
In 2014, the sex workers organisation "Guyana Sex Worker Coalition" and several NGOs called for prostitution to be legalised and regularization of sex work. The aims was to end discrimination and abuse towards sex workers and to give them full access to health services. The NGOs included Youth Challenge Guyana and the Society Against Sexual Orientation Discrimination.

== Mining ==
There is a gold mining industry in the interior of Guyana. Women, often from Maroon and Amerindian villages, come to the area to service the gold miner's sexual needs. The women work in "kiamoos!, temporary structures of wood, zinc or tarpaulin, that consist of a series of rooms, just big enough for a bed, where the women live and entertain clients. Women from the coast also travel to the mines, usually for a two or three month period. When there is a "shout" (significant find), the number of prostitutes around that mine increases.

There are also bauxite and diamond mines in the country which also attract prostitutes. However, the downturn in the bauxite industry in the early 2000s, and resulting in less employment and spending power of the men, led to a large decline in the number if sex workers around these mines.

There is evidence of women being trafficked to work as prostitutes at the mines.

== HIV ==
HIV is a problem in the country, however due to the efforts of the Guyanese government and international organisations, the situation is being controlled. The epidemic peaked in around 2006, and in 2016 it was estimated that 1.6% of the adult population were affected. Amongst other measures, including education about HIV, a condoms distribution programme has been initiated. Sex workers are a high risk group. The incidence of HIV amongst sex workers has fallen over the years: 47% in 1997, 27% in 2004, 16% in 2010 and 6.1% in 2016.

== Sex trafficking ==
Guyana is a source and destination country for men, women, and children subjected to sex trafficking. Women and children from Guyana, Brazil, the Dominican Republic, Suriname, and Venezuela are subjected to sex trafficking in mining communities in the interior and urban areas. While sex trafficking occurs in interior mining communities, limited government presence in the country's interior renders the full extent of trafficking unknown. Children are particularly vulnerable to sex trafficking. Guyanese nationals are subjected to sex trafficking in Jamaica, Suriname, and other Caribbean countries. Some police officers are complicit in trafficking crimes, and corruption impedes anti-trafficking efforts.

In 2017, the United States Department of State Office to Monitor and Combat Trafficking in Persons upgraded Guyana from a Tier 2 country to Tier 1 country following the Guyanese governments increased efforts to combat human trafficking.
