= Prostitution in Lebanon =

Prostitution in Lebanon is nominally legal and regulated. However, no licences have been issued since 1975. In modern Lebanon, prostitution takes place semi-officially via 'super night clubs', and illegally on the streets, in bars, hotels and brothels. UNAIDS estimate there to be 4,220 prostitutes in the country.

Cases of child prostitution are known and prosecuted, but no measures are taken to rehabilitate these juveniles.

Sex trafficking, therefore, is a problem in Lebanon.

== Overview ==
Street prostitution occurs in the country. The prostitutes are mainly Lebanese or Syrian. Prostitution also occurs in 'bars', especially in the Hamra area of Beirut and in Maameltein. The bars are licensed, but not for prostitution. They usually have 'secret' rooms at the back and the women, mostly Egyptians, Syrians and Sudanese, are controlled by a "Mom". They keep their liquor licenses and a blind eye is turned to the illegal activities because of bribes to the police.

Some Lebanese prostitutes work independently from hotels or rented apartments.

Male prostitution is also on the rise in the country.

=== Lebanon crisis since 2019-present ===
Since 2019, Lebanon has been facing an unprecedented economic crisis, political instability and widespread poverty, which have driven some Lebanese women into prostitution or other forms of survival sex. As living conditions continue to, worsen many Lebanese women and girls face increased vulnerability to exploitation.

=== Super night clubs ===
Super night clubs serve as places of introduction between prostitutes and clients. The clients may chat with an 'artiste' if they buy a bottle of champagne. During the chat, a 'date' may be arranged for the next day. No sexual services are permitted on the premises, and the woman negotiates her own price for the 'date'.

The clubs operate with the implicit consent of the Sûreté Générale (General Directorate of General Security), who set strict regulations. The women working in the clubs must be foreign nationals, Lebanese women are not allowed in the clubs. The migrant women must have a contract to enter the country, and are issued with an 'artiste' visa, to which strict conditions are attached.

The women must be at the club between 8pm to 5am, Sûreté or police may enter the club at any time to check the artistes are all present. The women must live in a hotel room, often adjacent to or in the same building as the club. They must be in the hotel between the time they finish work (5am) until 1pm. After 1pm, they may leave the hotel on a 'date'. The telephone number and car registration number of the client must be recorded when the women leave the hotel.

There are about 130 clubs, mainly in Maameltein. Many of the women working in them are of East European and North African origin. 11,284 women entered Lebanon under the 'artiste' program in 2016, more than double the number of women that entered under this program in 2015. Their artiste visas do not exceed six months, and they are deported if they are caught overstaying their visa.

== History ==
=== Pre-colonial era ===
During the era of slavery in Ottoman Lebanon, prostitution was connected to slavery. The Islamic Law formally prohibited prostitution. However, since the principle of concubinage in Islam in Islamic Law allowed a man to have intercourse with his female slave, prostitution was practiced by a pimp selling his female slave on the slave market to a client, who was allowed to have intercourse with her as her new owner, and who after intercourse returned his ownership of her to her pimp on the pretext of discontent, which was a legal and accepted method for prostitution in the Islamic world.

=== Colonial era ===
In 1931, whilst the country was under French control, a new law regulated prostitution. Prostitutes needed to be registered and were only allowed to work in licensed brothels. To obtain a license, they had to be over 21, not be a virgin, and have undergone a medical examination. The law criminalized working anywhere else. It also criminalized anybody facilitating working outside license requirements.

=== Post colonial era ===
At the start of the Lebanese Civil War in 1975, all of the licensed brothels were located near Martyrs' Square, in the Zeitoun district of downtown Beirut. All these brothels were destroyed during the fighting. No licenses have been issued since to prostitutes or brothels.

As a result of licenses not being issued, brothels operated illegally until a new law was passed in 1998, criminalizing businesses making rooms available for commercial sex.

The "super night clubs" were originally regular night clubs catering to the tourist trade in the 1960s. They closed down during the Civil War, and after the end of the war there were insufficient tourists to make them viable. The business model was changed to its current format and the clubs reopened.

=== Syrian Civil War ===
The Civil War in Syria has led to an influx of Syrian refugees into the sex trade in Lebanon. Some adult refugee women have been coerced into prostitution. A forced prostitution ring, run by a Syrian pimp, was dismantled in 2016 by Lebanese police, which raided the Chez Maurice and Le Silver brothels, both located in the Maameltein area which is known for its red-light district. The majority of the women and girls were recruited from Syria with false promises of work and subjected to commercial sexual exploitation where they experienced mental, physical, and sexual abuse, as well as forced abortions.

== Sex trafficking ==
Lebanon is a source and destination country for women and children subjected to sex trafficking and a transit country for Eastern European women and children subjected to sex trafficking in other Middle Eastern countries. Women from Eastern Europe and North Africa enter Lebanon to work in the adult entertainment industry through Lebanon's artiste visa program, which sustains a significant commercial sex industry and enables sex trafficking. Some women from East and West Africa are subjected to sex trafficking in Lebanon.

The 2011 anti-trafficking law prohibits all forms of human trafficking. Prescribed penalties for sex trafficking range from 5 to 15 years imprisonment, which are sufficiently stringent and commensurate with those prescribed for other serious crimes, such as rape.

In 2016, the internal security forces (ISF) anti-trafficking unit investigated 20 cases of suspected trafficking, involving 87 victims of sexual exploitation and child trafficking, and referred 26 suspected traffickers to the judiciary. The directorate of general security (DGS) investigated 14 potential trafficking cases involving artiste visa holders and four were referred to judicial or law enforcement authorities for further investigation.

The United States Department of State Office to Monitor and Combat Trafficking in Persons ranks Lebanon as a 'Tier 2' country.
