= Prostitution in Paraguay =

Prostitution in Paraguay is legal for persons over the age of 18, but related activities such as brothel keeping are prohibited. Prostitution is common in the country. Brothels are also common, even some rural villages have a small bar/brothel on the outskirts.

== Asunción ==
Whilst there is no red-light district in the capital, Asunción, street prostitution is widespread in the city centre, especially around Plaza Uruguaya. Brothels are also common in the city centre. Prostitutes can also be found in bars and discos.

There are about 30 "motels" in and around the city that cater for illicit sex. Rented by the hour, the suites are approached through a garage so people can't be seen entering or leaving. Any refreshments required are ordered by telephone and delivered through a flap in the door, payment is also made through the flap. The staff never see the guests.

After the Paraguayan War (1864 to 1870), Asunción was occupied by troops from Brazil, Argentina and Uruguay. Many women turned to prostitution. An unfinished theatre was converted into a brothel where 400 women worked and lived. When the occupying troops withdrew from the city, the Argentinian National Guard took 300 prostitutes back to Buenos Aires with them. In an attempt to 'clean up' the city, the authorities shipped many prostitutes to rural areas of the country.

== HIV ==
HIV is a problem in the country and sex workers are a high group. Since 1995 the government has been running a scheme for sex workers as part of their "Struggle Against AIDS" campaign. Social and health workers offer support, information, free testing and distribute condoms. There is a reluctance to use condoms in the country, partially due to the Catholic Church's opposition. Some clients offer to pay more for sex without a condom.

In 2016, UNAIDS estimated the HIV prevalence amongst sex workers to be 7%.

== Child prostitution ==
Child prostitution is a problem. Poor children are trafficked from rural areas to urban centers such as Asunción, Ciudad del Este, and Encarnación for commercial sexual exploitation. Street children and working children are common targets for trafficking recruiters.

In 2002, the International Labour Organisation's International Programme on the Elimination of Child Labour found that in Ciudad del Este, 250 of the 650 sex workers in the streets were underage. A 2005 study by United Nations Children's Fund (UNICEF) estimated two out of three sex workers were underage girls. Many NGOs and international organisations are working to alleviate the problem.

== Sex trafficking ==
Paraguay is a source, destination, and transit country for men, women, and children subjected to sex trafficking. Paraguayan women and girls are subjected to sex trafficking within the country, and transgender Paraguayans are vulnerable to sex trafficking. Thousands of Paraguayan children work as domestic servants in exchange for food, board, and occasionally education or a small stipend in a system called criadazgo; many of these children are subjected to domestic servitude and are highly vulnerable to sex trafficking. Indigenous persons are particularly at risk for sex trafficking. In 2015, authorities reported at least 24 Paraguayan women were recruited for work in Turkey and later exploited in forced prostitution in brothels throughout Turkey, Spain, and the northern area of Cyprus administered by Turkish Cypriots. The reliance of international trafficking rings on local recruiters remains a problem. Traffickers offer victims their freedom or pardon of debts if they recruit other victims and often rely on social media outlets as recruiting tools. Foreign victims of sex trafficking in Paraguay are mostly from other South American countries. Paraguayan victims of sex trafficking are found in Argentina, Spain, Brazil, Chile, Mexico, China, Colombia, and other countries. Paraguayan women are recruited as couriers of illicit narcotics to Europe and Africa, where they are subjected to forced prostitution.

NGOs and authorities reported government officials, including police, border guards, judges, and public registry employees, facilitated human trafficking, including by taking bribes from brothel owners in exchange for protection, extorting suspected traffickers in order to prevent arrest, and producing fraudulent identity documents.

The United States Department of State Office to Monitor and Combat Trafficking in Persons ranked Paraguay as a Tier 2 country.
