= Prostitution in the Crown Dependencies =

The Crown Dependencies are independently administered jurisdictions which do not form part of either the United Kingdom or the British Overseas Territories. They are self-governing possessions of the Crown (defined uniquely in each jurisdiction). Internationally, the dependencies are considered "territories for which the United Kingdom is responsible", rather than sovereign states.

== Bailiwick of Guernsey ==
Prostitution in Guernsey is legal, but related activities such as solicitation and brothel keeping are prohibited.

=== History ===
At the end of the 19th century prostitution was common in Guernsey, especially in St Peter Port where around 500 soldiers were garrisoned. A large number of the prostitutes were French. The military authorities were concerned about the high rate of STIs amongst the soldiers.

The Committee of the Council for the Affairs of Guernsey and Jersey reported in 1897:

"Secret Diseases, not unfrequently [sic] introduced by foreign prostitutes would appear to be prevalent in that Island [ie Guernsey] . . . such diseases sap the foundation of public health and affect injuriously not only those who by their own misconduct have incurred them, but even generations yet unborn . . ."[6]

This report eventually led to the passing of la Loi Rélative aux Maladies Secrètes in 1912. This law provided for compulsory medical examination and detention in hospital if infected, and also the expulsion of foreign prostitutes. This law was repealed by The Venereal Diseases Ordinance (1912) Repeal Ordinance, 1949. However, due to the wording of the 1949 act, the 1912 law is arguably still in force in Alderney.

In 2005 an East European prostitution ring was thought to be operating on the island.

== Bailiwick of Jersey ==
Prostitution in Jersey is legal, but related activities such as keeping a brothel are outlawed. Following a consultation period from 1 September 2017 and 13 October 2017, the Home Affairs Minister approved a new draft Sexual Offences (Jersey) Law to be debated in the Assembly of the States of Jersey. The draft law does not criminalise prostitution, but consolidates previous legislation on related activities.

In 2015 it was estimated there were 35–40 prostitutes in Jersey. Most visit the island for short periods and work from hotels.

=== History ===
In the 19th century, prostitution was common. French women came over to the island to service the needs of the soldiers stationed on the island and sailors in the port. The road that led from the barracks to the port, Pier Road, had many brothels and, after dark, women solicited in the road. In 1846, George Le Cronier, the Centenier of Saint Helier, decided to clean up the island. He visited one of the houses of ill-repute, Mulberry Cottage on Patriotic Street, and arrested 11 prostitutes who worked there. The following week he returned to the house with the intent of arresting the master and mistress of the house. On entering the house he was stabbed in the stomach by the mistress Marie Le Gendre. Le Cronier died the next day and Le Gendre was transported to Australia for life.

At the end of the 19th century, police would accompany gentlemen to brothels and, for a fee, ensure no legal action was taken against them. Prostitutes were using hotels and restaurants to find customers by 1910. In the 1930s, Sand Street was where street prostitutes worked and there was a well known brothel, the "Striped Monkey", on Cross Street.

During the German occupation of the island in 1940, all sexual contact between the German soldiers and the islanders was prohibited. To stop any "illegal" prostitution, the German authorities set up a brothel in the Maison de Victor Hugo hotel. Syphilis was a problem amongst the soldiers and a specialist clinic was set up in the Merton Hotel.

== Isle of Man ==
Prostitution in the Isle of Man is legal but related activities such as soliciting, procuring and brothel keeping are prohibited by the Sexual Offences Act 1992.

There are few prostitutes permanently on the Isle of Man, most visiting the island on short term "tours". A man and a woman were arrested on suspicion of committing prostitution offences in Douglas in 2013. A police spokesman said this was "an unusual and rare incident."
