= Prostitution in El Salvador =

Prostitution in El Salvador is not prohibited by national law, but may be prohibited by local municipal ordinances. Municipal ordinances may also prohibit the purchase of sexual services. Related activities such as facilitating, promoting or giving incentives to a person to work as a prostitute (pimping) are illegal. The prostitution of children (those under 18) is also illegal. Brothel ownership, however, is legal. There are no specific laws against human trafficking, but any criminal offence that includes ‘commerce in women or children’ requires sentencing to be increased by 30%.

Those municipalities that do not prohibit sex work often set up zones for sex workers away from schools and churches. In the San Esteban area of San Salvador, 17 brothels were forcibly closed in August 1998 for being too close to schools and churches.

Prostitution is common in the country, especially around "Parque Infantil", in the capital, San Salvador. After the civil war, the demands of the increased military presence in San Salvador caused the number of prostitutes to double to 19,000.

UNAIDS estimated that there were 20,385 sex workers in the country in 2016.

== Sex worker support organisations ==
=== Organización de Trabajadoras del Sexo ===
The Organización de Trabajadoras del Sexo (OTS) is an organisation set up by sex workers to combat discrimination, abuse and violence against sex workers. It provides support and information to sex workers in 15 municipalities. The organisation advocates legal and policy reforms to reduce violence, stigma and discrimination against sex workers.

=== Asociación Mujeres Flor de Piedra ===
The Asociación Mujeres Flor de Piedra works with sex workers in one neighbourhood in San Salvador. They plan to expand to other neighbourhoods in the city. They organise a wide variety of activities: health & HIV workshops, condom distribution etc. One of their aims is to change the way Salvadorian society, including the country's government, views sex workers and reduce discrimination against them.

The association was formed in 1991 by a group of Franciscan Fathers. They receive funding from Dutch development organisation, Hivos.

== HIV ==
HIV/AIDS in El Salvador has a less than 1 percent prevalence of the adult population reported to be HIV-positive, and therefore is a low-HIV-prevalence country, but the virus remains a significant threat in high-risk communities including commercial sex workers. Although prevalence is 2.8 percent among sex workers, it is as high as 16 percent in specific areas, such as Puerto de Acajutla.

It was estimated in 2008 that 90 percent of sex workers did not use condoms with regular partners. UNAIDS estimated a 73% usage of condoms by sex workers in 2016. Compounding these issues are stigma and discrimination toward HIV-infected individuals and at-risk groups, which can deter people from getting tested and receiving adequate support if they have the disease.

Sex worker support organisations, such as Organización de Trabajadoras del Sexo and Asociación Mujeres Flor de Piedra, run campaigns on HIV prevention and distribute condoms. They also provide support for sex workers infected with the virus.

== Child Prostitution ==
Child prostitution is a problem. An NGO study in 1998 indicated that at least 44% of the estimated 1,300 prostitutes in 3 major red light districts of San Salvador were between the ages of 13 and 18. Among all prostitutes of the country, between 10 and 25 percent of visible prostitutes are minors, and an estimated 40 percent of the hidden prostitutes who cater to upper-class clients are believed to be minors, according to a UNICEF study released in 2000

== Sex trafficking ==
El Salvador is a source, transit, and destination country for women, men, and children subjected to sex trafficking. Women, men, and children are exploited in sex trafficking within the country; LGBTI persons, especially transgender individuals, are at particular risk. Some men, women, and children from neighbouring countries, particularly Nicaragua, Guatemala and Honduras, are subjected to sex trafficking. Traffickers use employment agencies and social media to lure victims with promises of lucrative employment; one organisation noted traffickers are increasingly targeting people in the regions of the country with high levels of violence and coercing victims and their families through threats of violence. Salvadoran men, women, and children are subjected to sex trafficking in Guatemala, Mexico, Belize, and the United States.

Media and government officials report organised criminal groups, including transnational criminal organisations, are involved in trafficking crimes. Some Salvadorans who irregularly migrate to the United States are subjected to sex trafficking en route to or upon arrival in the country. Some Latin American migrants transit El Salvador to Guatemala and North America, where they are exploited in sex trafficking. Corruption, particularly within the judiciary, remained a significant obstacle to law enforcement efforts. In 2014, media reported several public officials, including legislators, political party officials, and a mayor, purchased commercial sex acts from trafficking victims. Prison guards and justice officials have been investigated for trafficking-related complicity.

The United States Department of State Office to Monitor and Combat Trafficking in Persons ranks El Salvador as a Tier 2 country.
