= Prostitution in the Bahamas =

Prostitution in the Bahamas is legal but related activities such as brothel keeping and solicitation are prohibited. The country is a sex tourism destination, including 'all in' tours. UNAIDS estimate there are 3,000 prostitutes in the Bahamas.

During the Republic of Pirates (c1706 - 1718), Nassau and the rest of New Providence Island was paradise of drinking and prostitution for pirates.

Sex trafficking is a problem on the island.

== Sex trafficking ==
Human traffickers exploit domestic and foreign victims in The Bahamas, and traffickers exploit victims from The Bahamas abroad. Traffickers recruit migrant workers, especially those from Haiti, Jamaica, the Dominican Republic, China, Costa Rica, Cuba, Colombia, Venezuela, the Philippines, and the United States through false offers of employment, such as through advertisements in foreign newspapers; upon arrival, traffickers subject them to sex trafficking. Children born outside The Bahamas to female citizens or in The Bahamas to foreign-born parents who do not automatically receive Bahamian citizenship are at heightened risk of trafficking. Individuals lured for employment and those involved in prostitution and exotic dancing and illegal migrants are particularly vulnerable to trafficking. Traffickers previously confiscated victims’ passports, but currently often allow victims to retain their documents in case they are questioned by law enforcement.

The government enacted amendments effective 31 March 2017 to the criminal procedure code and the 2008 law to allow prosecutors the option to prosecute trafficking cases directly before the Supreme Court without the necessity of going first to a lower Magistrate's Court; and created a new offense that criminalizes the organizing, engagement in, or directing another to engage in, trafficking in persons.

The United States Department of State Office to Monitor and Combat Trafficking in Persons ranks The Bahamas as a 'Tier 1' country.
