= Prostitution in Kosovo =

Prostitution in Kosovo is illegal, and can incur a prison sentence of up to sixty days. The Global Fund to Fight AIDS, Tuberculosis and Malaria's HIV Program in Kosovo estimated there to be 5,037 prostitutes in the country. Many women turn to prostitution through poverty.

There are report that prostitution has become a new organised crime in Kosovo.

== Recent history ==
Prior to the Kosovo War following the 2008 Kosovo declaration of independence, prostitution was limited to serving the needs of locals.

Following the ceasefire and presence in the country of the United Nations Interim Administration Mission in Kosovo and other international organisations, the demand for prostitution soared. As well as women turning to prostitution voluntarily, some were trafficked from Moldova, Bulgaria and Ukraine.

Amnesty International UK Director Kate Allen is quoted as saying "Women and girls as young as 11 are being sold into sexual slavery in Kosovo and international peacekeepers are not only failing to stop it they are actively fuelling this despicable trade by themselves paying for sex from trafficked women."

Head of the Mitrovica based International Press Centre, Rade Negojevic, claimed Kosovo had become the world's biggest brothel since the arrival of the international peacekeepers.

In 2000, the UNMIK administration set up a Trafficking and Prostitution Police Unit with the intention combating pimps, traffickers and organised crime. Measures against trafficking were included in the Interim Penal Code of Kosovo when it was drafted.

The State Police Service reported in 2008 that prostitution was occurring in 694 bars, cafeteria and night clubs in Kosovo.

== Sex trafficking ==
Kosovo is mostly a destination country ( but also a source) for women and children subjected to sex trafficking. Most victims are internally trafficked for sexual exploitation. Traffickers recruit victims through false promises of marriage or employment offers in cafes, night-clubs, and restaurants. Many prostitutes, especially from foreign countries also come voluntarily to prostitute in Kosovo. Most sex trafficking victims in Kosovo are girls, with criminal groups which also force women or bring women from Moldova, Romania, Serbia, Bulgaria, Ukraine, Albania and other European countries ( such as Russia) into prostitution. Women and girls are subjected to sex trafficking in private homes and apartments, night-clubs, and massage parlors. Children used as dancers and escorts are vulnerable to sex trafficking. Traffickers subject Kosovo citizens that belong to minorities to forced prostitution throughout Europe. Economically marginalized Roma, Ashkali, and Egyptians communities are vulnerable and used for sex trafficking. Government corruption creates an environment that enables some trafficking crimes. Several police officers, labor ministry employees, and other government officials have been charged with or convicted of trafficking crimes.

Article 171 of the criminal code prohibits all forms of trafficking and prescribes punishments of five to 12 years imprisonment and a fine of up to €500,000. When sex trafficking offenses involve minors or a group of victims subjected to sex trafficking, the penalties increase to 15 to 20 years imprisonment and a fine. Article 231 prohibits taking sexual services from a trafficking victim.

The United States Department of State Office to Monitor and Combat Trafficking in Persons ranks Kosovo as a 'Tier 2' country.
