= Prostitution in Monaco =

Prostitution in Monaco is legal, but organized prostitution (brothels, prostitution rings and other forms of pimping) is prohibited. Solicitation is also illegal. Forcing another person into prostitution is illegal, with penalties from six months to three years of imprisonment, plus a fine. A husband who forces his wife to engage in prostitution can be sentenced to one to five years of imprisonment plus a fine.

Prostitution takes place most commonly in hotels, bars and nightclubs. There are around 50 prostitutes in the country, nearly half are Brazilian, but this increases during sporting events such as the Monaco Grand Prix. Most are residents of France due to the relative ease of transit and proximity to France.

Despite the legality of prostitution, the law states that government authorization is required in order to practice any given profession. Due to a lack of process for the formal authorization for prostitution, it falls outside the regulation of Monegasque labor laws.

== Types of Prostitution ==
=== Brothel/Procuring Prostitution ===
Brothels, procuring, and any other means of organized prostitution are outlawed by Monegasque government. These institutions are barred due to the following acts being outlawed and punishable by up to 3 years imprisonment : pressuring someone to start or continue prostituting, hiding and/or helping to promote the prostitution of others, sharing in and collecting revenue from someone engaging in prostitution, and facilitating the engagement of an interaction between a prostitute and a client. The punishment for pandering reaches 5 to 10 years imprisonment if any of the following criteria are met: if pandering more than one person, if violence; intimidation; or deceit are present, or if organized by more than one person.

=== Red Light Districts ===
Informal red light districts form around and near hotels, clubs, and other adult establishments especially during the Grand Prix; Monaco's largest tourist attracting event.

=== Independent Prostitution ===
Independent prostitution of a consenting adult is the only form of prostitution allowed by Monegasque law.

== Measures Against Exploitation ==
=== Prostitution ===
In order to help prevent egregious human rights violations, Monaco designates a special police unit to monitor the activities of women in prostitution. In addition to monitoring, the security unit informs prostitutes of possible risks and resources available to them.

=== Prostitution of a Minor ===
Article 265 of the Monegasque Penal Code stipulates that attempting to or successfully inciting and/or forcing a minor into debauchery, whether inside or outside the territory, is an offense punishable by 6 months to 3 years of imprisonment. The same punishment is allotted to those that help organize and/or facilitate such behavior. Pandering with regards to a minor is punishable by another 5 to 10 years imprisonment, a sentence which lengthens to 10 to 20 years imprisonment if the minor is below 16 years of age.

The act of soliciting a minor for sexual activity in exchange for any good or service is also illegal and punishable by up to 3 to 5 years of imprisonment. Having sexual relations with a minor regardless of the context is punishable by 1 to 5 years in prison, in addition, the Monegasque Penal Code stipulates that any sort of sexual penetration of a minor by a relative and/or person in position of authority incurs rape charges punishable by 10 to 20 years imprisonment, the maximum punishment is allotted automatically if the minor is below 16 years of age. Monaco reports no known incidents of the prostitution of a minor.

=== Sex trafficking ===
There are no confirmed reports that Monaco was a source, destination, or transit country for victims of sex trafficking. Monaco is opposed to Human Trafficking and is one of the signatories for the UN treaty "Protocol to Prevent, Suppress and Punish Trafficking in Persons, Especially Women and Children" but not the "Convention for the Suppression of the Traffic in Persons and of the Exploitation of the Prostitution of Others".
