= Prostitution in Harlem Renaissance =

Overview of practice of prostitution in 1900s New York

Prostitution in the Harlem Renaissance was common. Attitudes towards sexuality were based in traditional religion. Sex was a private matter and was taboo outside of procreation in marriage. In other contexts, sex was viewed as sinful and scandalous. However, these cultural norms did not succeed in stamping out such practices.

== Rise in occupation ==
Following the Civil War, Harlem thrived as African Americans brought forth art and literature, creating the Harlem Renaissance. An unprecedented amount of wealth was generated there from illicit occupations. Illegal activity such as drug dealing, bootlegging, gambling, and prostitution were all common. The Mann Act of 1910 made transportation of women for prostitution illegal. Prostitution in Harlem was intermingled with divorce raids (arrests of people caught in flagrante delicto with someone other than their spouse). Black prostitutes were the poorest and cheapest prostitutes in New York City. Harlem prostitutes charged white men more than black men for their services.

== Investigations ==
In Harlem during the roaring twenties, prostitution was only one of many illegal occupations. In 1928, the Committee of Fourteen examined Harlem nightlife. What began as a search for speakeasies turned into an investigation of prostitution. African American sociologist and activist W.E.B. Dubois claimed that any examination of black prostitution would have led to policing of interracial relations, which would promote segregation. The committee further attempted to use these investigations to shut down black-owned businesses.

Little history about prostitution in this era addresses anything other than arrests. Beginning in the early 1920s, Black prostitutes were predominantly accused of committing public indecency.

== Establishments ==
Brothels were upscale prostitution rings that charged higher prices and offered amenities such as food and (illegal) alcohol. They appeared in wealthy areas such as Manhattan. Buffet flats were apartment complexes or businesses that housed 'normal operations' during the day, but after dark transformed into gambling spots, bars, and rooms for rent for prostitution. Speakeasies sold alcohol and sex. Saloons and cabarets operated legally, generally without Black prostitution. Prostitution among Blacks was more visible, given that the act often took place in public areas such as alleyways and cars parked on the street, while white prostitutes were more likely to work indoors.

Businesses provided a safer haven for Black prostitutes. In many cases, the owners of the clubs rented space to prostitutes or their pimps.

== Location ==
Harlem's red light district (the Tenderloin) stretched between 127th street and 135th street. It was poor and dirty. Police made most of their arrests there because the prostitutes were most likely streetwalkers. With the opening of a subway in 1904, Harlem became easier to access and became a prostitution hot spot. In 1908, A.V. Morgenstern observed that the music and dancehalls north of Central Park were "meeting" places of the professional prostitutes who took clients into numerous "transient hotels" nearby. Along Seventh and Lennox avenue, prostitution was more expensive because the residents were more prosperous and prostitution operated indoors.
