= Prostitution in the Solomon Islands =

Prostitution in the Solomon Islands is legal but related activities such as soliciting and brothel keeping are prohibited. Prostitution occurs mainly in the capital, Honiara, and around logging camps in Makira, Malaita and Isabel islands. Many of the women involved have turned to prostitution due to poverty, some starting at the age of 13. The laws are rarely enforced.

Child prostitution is a problem in the Solomon Islands, sometimes with the complicity of family members. Sex trafficking is also a problem.

== Legislation ==
The Penal Code of the Solomon Islands criminalises the following prostitution related activities:

- Section 144 - Procuration
- Section 145 - Procuring defilement of woman by threats or fraud or administering drugs
- Section 148 - Detention with intent or in a brothel
- Section 153 1(a) - Living wholly or in part on the earnings of prostitution
- Section 153 1(b) - Solicitation
- Section 153 1(c) - For the purpose of gain exercises control, direction or influence over a prostitute
- Section 155 - Brothels

== Honiara Central Market ==
In 2009, there were active student surveys of the sex trade involving market women and young girls from the Central Market. In 2014, fishermen, who were paid to transport girls to foreign fishing vessels outside the harbour of Honiara, described the Central Market as one of "the most evident or well-known pickup spots" for prostitution.

== RAMSI ==
In 2006, the Solomon Islands' Prime Minister, Manasseh Sogavare, filed a police complaint against the Australian led Regional Assistance Mission to Solomon Islands (RAMSI). He alleged the peacekeeping force were smuggling local women into their base at the former Guadalcanal Beach Resort and using them as prostitutes. The claims were denied by the RAMSI.

== Sex trafficking ==
The Solomon Islands is a source, transit, and destination country for local and Southeast Asian women subjected to forced prostitution, and local children subjected to sex trafficking. Women from China, Indonesia, Malaysia, and the Philippines are recruited for legitimate work, some paying large sums of money in recruitment fees, and upon arrival are forced into prostitution.

Solomon Island children are subjected to sex trafficking within the country, sometimes in exchange for money or goods, particularly near foreign logging camps, on foreign and local commercial fishing vessels, and at hotels and entertainment establishments. Girls and young women are recruited to travel to logging camps for domestic work and some are subsequently exploited in prostitution. Some parents receive payments for sending young women and girls into forced marriages with foreign workers at logging and mining companies; many of them are exploited in prostitution.

The United States Department of State Office to Monitor and Combat Trafficking in Persons ranks the Solomon Islands as a "Tier 2" country.
