= Prostitution in the Gambia =

Prostitution in the Gambia is widespread but illegal. Most of the estimated 31,000 prostitutes in the Gambia are from Sierra Leone, Liberia, and Guinea . Prostitution takes place on the beach, in bars and hotels on the coast. Away from the coast, prostitution mainly takes place in bars. The bars are frequently raided and the foreign prostitutes deported. They often return within a few days.

Prostitutes in the Gambia are primarily young men. The HIV infection rate for prostitutes is high.

== Sex tourism ==
Gambia is a popular destination for sex tourism. One of the most popular areas is the "Senegambia strip", the coastal area around Kololi, and is often arranged through local "bumsters".

The primary audience for sex tourism in the Gambia are American women who are interested in having sex with men at a low cost. Since statistics first became available in 2014, it is estimated that over 670,000 women from America alone have traveled to the Gambia for the purposes of engaging in the illicit sex trade.

The Gambian Tourist Board has announced plans to change the face of tourism in the country and encourage tourism for wildlife and heritage rather than sex.

== Child prostitution ==
Child prostitution is a major crisis in the Gambia. The Gambian government is taking an active stance against it. Many young people turn to the sex trade due to poverty.

The Gambia ratified the United Nations Convention on the Rights of the Child on 3 August 1990, and the African Charter on the Rights and Welfare of the Child in September 2000, which mandates the government to protect children from sexual child abuse. The main legislation is the Tourism Offences Act, 2003, which is describes a child as anyone under eighteen, even though the legal age of consent is sixteen years. The Tourism Act means that anyone employed in the tourism industry is committing a crime if s/he offers sexual favours to customers for money. The punishment is a fine, imprisonment of a maximum of two years and disqualification from tourism related work for ten years. The law states that hotel operators can face a fine and five years in prison if they knowingly allow child prostitution on their property.

Child prostitution is particularly prevalent around the Tourist Development Area, as well as in Kololi, Senegambia and Pipeline.

Some girls are sent to be prostitutes by their parents to support their families.

Within The Gambia, girls and, to a lesser extent, boys are subjected to sex trafficking. Children from West African countries, mainly Senegal, Sierra Leone, Liberia, Ghana, Nigeria, Guinea, Guinea-Bissau, and Benin, are recruited for commercial sexual exploitation in The Gambia. The majority of these victims are subjected to sexual exploitation by child sex tourists, primarily from Britain, Germany, Scandinavia, the Netherlands and Canada. In recent years, sex traffickers are increasingly hosting child sex tourists in private residences outside the commercial tourist areas of the capital, Banjul, making the crime harder for law enforcement to detect. Traffickers have allegedly exploited Sierra Leonean boys and girls as “cultural dancers” in The Gambia. Observers believe organised sex trafficking networks use European and Gambian travel agencies to promote child sex tourism.

== Sex trafficking ==
The Gambia is a Tier 2 Watch List country for Human trafficking according to the US Department of State. The Gambian 2007 Trafficking Act prohibits trafficking and those convicted can be sentenced to prison for up to 50 years.

The Gambia is a source and destination country for women and children subjected to sex trafficking. Within The Gambia, women, girls, and—to a lesser extent—boys are subjected to sex trafficking. Women and children from West African countries—mainly Senegal, Sierra Leone, Liberia, Ghana, Nigeria, Guinea, Guinea-Bissau, and Benin—are recruited for commercial sexual exploitation in The Gambia.
