= Prostitution in North Korea =

Prostitution in North Korea is illegal and is not visible to visitors. Alleged accounts given by some North Korean defectors say that a collection of women called the kippumjo provided sexual entertainment to high-ranking officials until 2011. Meanwhile, some North Korean women who migrate to China become involved in prostitution.

== Private prostitution ==
Under Article 261 of the criminal law, prostitution is punishable by up to two years labour if engaged in "multiple times". According to CIA analyst Helen-Louise Hunter, during the rule of Kim Il Sung, there was no organized prostitution, but some prostitution was still practiced discreetly near railroad stations and restaurants. While defectors currently report widespread prostitution, this is not experienced by visitors to the country.

== Kippumjo ==
The kippŭmjo is an alleged collection of groups of approximately 2,000 women and girls that was maintained by the head of state of North Korea for the purpose of providing pleasure, mostly of a sexual nature, and entertainment for high-ranking Workers' Party of Korea (WPK) officials and their families, as well as occasionally distinguished guests. Its prostitutes were known as manjokcho (만족조 "satisfaction team(s)") and were organised as a part of the kippŭmjo, who were drafted from among 14- to 20-year-old virgins, trained for about 20 months, and often "ordered to marry guards of Kim Jong Il or national heroes" when they are 25 years old.

For a girl selected to serve in the kippŭmjo, it was impossible to refuse, even if she was the daughter of a party official. Manjokcho were obliged to have sex with high-ranking male officials of the WPK. Their services were not available to most North Korean men.

Not all kippŭmjo worked as prostitutes; other kippŭmjo activities were massaging and half-naked singing and dancing.

The kippŭmjo were disbanded shortly after Kim Jong Il's death in 2011, although in 2015 it was reported that his successor Kim Jong Un was restarting it.

== Sex trafficking ==
North Korea is a source country for women and children who are subjected to sex trafficking. The United States Department of State Office to Monitor and Combat Trafficking in Persons ranks North Korea as a 'Tier 3' country.

=== Prostitution of North Koreans in China ===
Some North Korean women who migrate to China become prostitutes, either voluntarily or forcibly. According to the UN Commission of Inquiry on Human Rights, when the women are repatriated to North Korea, they are subjected to forced abortion and their mixed race children are subject to infanticide.

== See also ==
- Prostitution in South Korea
- Prostitutes in South Korea for the U.S. military
