= Normality (behavior) =

Most common behavior for a person or social group

Normality is a behavior that can be normal for an individual (intrapersonal normality) when it is consistent with the most common behavior for that person. Normal is also used to describe individual behavior that conforms to the most common behavior in society (known as conformity). However, normal behavior is often only recognized in contrast to abnormality. In many cases normality is used to make moral judgements, such that normality is seen as good while abnormality is seen as bad, or conversely normality can be seen as boring and uninteresting. Someone being seen as normal or not normal can have social ramifications, such as being included, excluded or stigmatized by wider society.

== Measuring ==
Many difficulties arise in measuring normal behaviors—biologists come across parallel issues when defining normality. One complication that arises regards whether 'normality' is used correctly in everyday language. People say "this heart is abnormal" if only a portion of it is not working correctly, yet it may be inaccurate to include the entirety of the heart under the description of 'abnormal'. There can be a difference between the normality of a body part's structure and its function. Similarly, a behavioral pattern may not conform to social norms, but still be effective and non-problematic for that individual. Where there is a dichotomy between appearance and function of a behavior, it may be difficult to measure its normality. This is applicable when trying to diagnose a pathology and is addressed in the Diagnostic and Statistical Manual of Mental Disorders.

== Statistical normality ==
In general, 'normal' refers to a lack of significant deviation from the average. The word normal is used in a more narrow sense in mathematics, where a normal distribution describes a population whose characteristics center around the average or the norm. When looking at a specific behavior, such as the frequency of lying, a researcher may use a Gaussian bell curve to plot all reactions, and a normal reaction would be within one standard deviation, or the most average 68.3%. However, this mathematical model only holds for one particular trait at a time, since, for example, the probability of a single individual being within one standard deviation for 36 independent variables would be one in a million.

In statistics, normal is often arbitrarily considered anything that falls within about 1.96 standard deviations of the mean, i.e. the most average 95% (1.96). The probability of an individual being within 1.96 standard deviations for 269 independent variables is approximately one in a million. For only 59 independent variables, the probability is just under 5%. Under this definition of normal, it is abnormal to be normal for 59 independent variables.

== Sociology ==
=== Durkheim ===
In his Rules of the Sociological Method, French sociologist Émile Durkheim indicates that it is necessary for the sociological method to offer parameters in order to distinguish normality from pathology or abnormality. He suggests that behaviors, or social facts, which are present in the majority of cases are normal, and exceptions to that behavior indicate pathology. Durkheim's model of normality further explains that the most frequent or general behaviors, and thus the most normal behaviors, will persist through transition periods in society.

Crime, for instance, should be considered normal because it exists in every society through every time period. There is a two-fold version of normality; behaviors considered normal on a societal level may still be considered pathological on an individual level. On the individual level, people who violate social norms, such as criminals, will invite a punishment from others in the society.

=== Social norms ===
An individual's behaviors are guided by what they perceive to be society's expectations and their peers' norms. People measure the appropriateness of their actions by how far away they are from those social norms. However, what is perceived as the norm may or may not actually be the most common behavior. In some cases of pluralistic ignorance, most people wrongly believe the social norm is one thing, but in fact very few people hold that view.

When people are made more aware of a social norm, particularly a descriptive norm (i.e., a norm describing what is done), their behavior changes to become closer to that norm. The power of these norms can be harnessed by social norms marketing, where the social norm is advertised to people in an attempt to stop extreme behavior, such as binge drinking. However, people at the other extreme (very little alcohol consumption) are equally likely to change their behavior to become closer to the norm, in this case by increasing alcohol consumption.

Instead of using descriptive norms, more effective social norms marketing may use injunctive norms which, instead of describing the most common behavior, outline what is approved or disapproved of by society. When individuals become aware of the injunctive norm, only the extremes will change their behavior (by decreasing alcohol consumption) without the boomerang effect of under-indulgers increasing their drinking.

The social norms that guide people are not always normal for everyone. Behaviors that are abnormal for most people may be considered normal for a subgroup or subculture. For example, normal college student behavior may be to party and drink alcohol, but for a subculture of religious students, normal behavior may be to go to church and pursue religious activities. Subcultures may actively reject "normal" behavior, instead replacing society norms with their own.

What is viewed as normal can change dependent on both timeframe and environment. Normality can be viewed as "an endless process of man's self-creation and his reshaping of the world." Within this idea, it is possible to surmise that normality is not an all-encompassing term, but simply a relative term based around a current trend in time. With statistics, this is likened to the thought that if the data gathered provides a mean and standard deviation, over time these data that predict "normalness" start to predict or dictate it less and less since the social idea of normality is dynamic. This is shown in studies done on behavior in both psychology and sociology where behavior in mating rituals or religious rituals can change within a century in humans, showing that the "normal" way that these rituals are performed shifts and a new procedure becomes the normal one.

Since normality shifts in time and environment, the mean and standard deviation are only useful for describing normality from the environment from which they are collected.

==== Sexual behavior ====
As another example, understandings of what is normal sexual behavior varies greatly across time and place. In many countries, perceptions on sexuality are largely becoming more liberal, especially views on the normality of masturbation and homosexuality. Social understanding on normal sexual behavior also varies greatly country by country; countries can be divided into categories of how they approach sexual normality, as conservative, homosexual-permissive, or liberal.

The United States, Ireland, and Poland have more conservative social understanding of sexuality among university students, while Scandinavian students consider a wider variety of sexual acts as normal. Although some attempts have been made to define sexual acts as normal, abnormal, or indeterminate, these definitions are time-sensitive. Gayle Rubin's 1980s model of sexual 'normality' was comprehensive at the time but has since become outdated as society has liberalized.

=== Regulation ===
A disharmony exists between a virtual identity of the self and a real social identity, whether it be in the form of a trait or attribute. If a person does not have this disharmony, then he or she is described as normal. A virtual identity can take many definitions, but in this case a virtual identity is the identity that persons mentally create that conforms to societal standards and norms, it may not represent how they actually are, but it represents what they believe is the typical "normal" person. A real social identity is the identity that persons actually have in their society or is perceived, by themselves or others, to have. If these two identities have differences between each other, there is said to be disharmony. Individuals may monitor and adapt their behavior in terms of others' expected perceptions of the individual, which is described by the social psychology theory of self-presentation. In this sense, normality exists based on societal norms, and whether someone is normal is entirely up to how he or she views him- or herself in contrast to how society views him or her. While trying to define and quantify normality is a good start, all definitions confront the problem of whether we are even describing an idea that even exists since there are so many different ways of viewing the concept.

=== Effects of labeling ===
When people do not conform to the normal standard, they are often labelled as sick, disabled, abnormal, or unusual, which can lead to marginalization or stigmatization. Most people want to be normal and strive to be perceived as such, so that they can relate to society at large. Without having things in common with the general population, people may feel isolated among society. The abnormal person feels like they have less in common with the normal population, and others have difficulty relating to things that they have not experienced themselves. Additionally, abnormality may make others uncomfortable, further separating the abnormally labelled individual.

Since being normal is generally considered an ideal, there is often pressure from external sources to conform to normality, as well as pressure from people's intrinsic desire to feel included. For example, families and the medical community will try to help disabled people live a normal life. However, the pressure to appear normal, while actually having some deviation, creates a conflict—sometimes someone will appear normal, while actually experiencing the world differently or struggling. When abnormality makes society feel uncomfortable, it is the exceptional person themselves who will laugh it off to relieve social tension. A disabled person is given normal freedoms, but may not be able to show negative emotions. Lastly, society's rejection of deviance and the pressure to normalize may cause shame in some individuals. Abnormalities may not be included in an individual's sense of identity, especially if they are unwelcome abnormalities.

When an individual's abnormality is labelled as a pathology, it is possible for that person to take on both elements of the sick role or the stigmatization that follows some illnesses. Mental illness, in particular, is largely misunderstood by the population and often overwhelms others' impression of the patient.

== Intrapersonal normality ==
Most definitions of normality consider interpersonal normality, the comparison between many different individual's behaviors to distinguish normality from abnormality. Intrapersonal normality looks at what is normal behavior for one particular person (consistency within a person) and would be expected to vary person-to-person. A mathematical model of normality could still be used for intrapersonal normality, by taking a sample of many different occurrences of behavior from one person over time.

Also like interpersonal normality, intrapersonal normality may change over time, due to changes in the individual as they age and due to changes in society (since society's view of normality influences individual peoples' behavior).

It is most comfortable for people to engage in behavior which conforms to their own personal habitual norms. When things go wrong, people are more likely to attribute the negative outcome on any abnormal behavior leading up to the mishap. After a car crash, people may say "if only I didn't leave work early," blaming the crash on their actions which were not normal. This counterfactual thinking particularly associates abnormal behavior with negative outcomes.

== Behavioral normality ==
In medicine, behavioral normality pertains to a patient's mental condition aligning with that of a model, so a healthy patient. A person without any mental illness is considered a normal patient, whereas a person with a mental disability or illness is viewed as abnormal. These normals and abnormals in the context of mental health subsequently create negative stigmatic perceptions towards individuals with mental illness.

According to the Brain & Behavior Research Foundation, "an estimated 26.2 percent of Americans ages 18 and older—about 1 in 4 adults—suffer from one or more of (several) disorders in a given year." Though the population of American individuals living with mental illness is not as small of a minority as commonly perceived, it is considered abnormal nonetheless, therefore the subject of discrimination and abuse such as violent therapies, punishments, or labeling for life by the normal, healthy majority. The CDC reported that "cluster[s] of negative attitudes and beliefs motivate the general public to fear, reject, avoid, and discriminate against people with mental illnesses." In continuum, the resources available to those who suffer from such illness are limited, and government support is constantly being cut from programs that help individuals living with mental illness live more comfortable, accommodative, happier lives.

== Neuronal and synaptic normality ==
Hebbian associative learning and memory maintenance depends on synaptic normalization mechanisms to prevent synaptic runaway. Synaptic runaway describes overcrowding of dendritic associations, which reduce sensory or behavioral acuteness that is proportional to the level of synaptic runaway. Synaptic/neuronal normalization refers to synaptic competition, where the prosper of one synapse may weakening the efficacy of other nearby surrounding synapses with redundant neurotransmission.

Animal dendritic density greatly increases throughout waking hours despite intrinsic normalization mechanisms as described as above. The growth rate of synaptic density is not sustained in a cumulative fashion. Without a pruning state, the signal to noise ratio of CNS mechanism would not be able to operate with maximum effectiveness, and learning would be detrimental to animal survival. Neuronal and synaptic normalization mechanisms must operate so positive association feedback loops to not become rampant while constantly processing new environmental information.

Some researchers speculate that the slow oscillation (nREM) cycles of animal sleep constitute an essential 're-normalization' phase. The re-normalization occurs from cortical large amplitude brain rhythm, in the low delta range (0.5–2 Hz), synaptically downscaling the associations from the wakeful learning state. Only the strongest associations survive the pruning from this phase. This allows retention of salient information coding from the previous day, but also allows more cortical space and energy distribution to continue effective learning subsequently after a slow-wave oscillation episode of sleep.

Also, organisms tend to have a normal biological developmental pathway as a central nervous system ages and/or learns. Deviations for a species' normal development frequently will result in behavior dysfunction, or death, of that organism.

== Clinical normality ==
Applying normality clinically depends on the field and situation a practitioner is in. In the broadest sense, clinical normality is the idea of uniformity of physical and psychological functioning across individuals.

Psychiatric normality, in a broad sense, states that psychopathology are disorders that are deviations from normality.

Normality, and abnormality, can be characterized statistically. Related to the previous definition, statistical normality is usually defined it in terms of a normal distribution curve, with the so-called 'normal zone' commonly accounting for 95.45% of all the data. The remaining 4.55% will lie split outside of two standard deviations from the mean. Thus any variable case that lies outside of two deviations from the mean would be considered abnormal. However, the critical value of such statistical judgments may be subjectively altered to a less conservative estimate. It is in fact normal for a population to have a proportion of abnormals. The presence of abnormals is important because it is necessary to define what 'normal' is, as normality is a relative concept. So at a group, or macro, level of analysis, abnormalities are normal given a demographic survey; while at an individual level, abnormal individuals are seen as being deviant in some way that needs to be corrected.

Statistical normality is important in determining demographic pathologies. When a variable rate, such as virus spread within a human population, exceeds its normal infection rate, then preventative or emergency measures can be introduced. However, it is often impractical to apply statistical normality to diagnose individuals. Symptom normality is the current, and assumed most effective, way to assess patient pathology.

=== DSM ===
Normality, as a relative concept, is intrinsically involved with contextual elements. As a result, clinical disorder classification has particular challenges in discretely diagnosing 'normal' constitutions from true disorders. The Diagnostic and Statistical Manual of Mental Disorders (DSM) is the psychiatric profession's official classification manual of mental disorders since its first published version (DSM-I) by the American Psychological Association in 1952.

As the DSM evolved into its current version (DSM-5) in late 2013, there have been numerous conflicts in proposed classification between mental illness and normal mentality. In his book Saving Normal, Allen Frances, who chaired the task force for content in the DSM-IV and DSM-IV-TR, wrote a scathing indictment of the pressures incumbent on the definition of "normal" relative to psychological constructs and mental illness.

Most of this difficulty stems from the DSM's ambiguity of natural contextual stressor reactions versus individual dysfunction. There are some key progressions along the DSM history that have attempted to integrate some aspects of normality into proper diagnosis classification. As a diagnostic manual for classification of abnormalities, all DSMs have been biased towards classifying symptoms as disorders by emphasizing symptomatic singularity. The result is an encompassing misdiagnosis of possible normal symptoms, appropriate as contextually derived.

==== DSM-II ====
The second edition of the DSM could not be effectively applied because of its vague descriptive nature. Psychodynamic etiology was a strong theme in classifying mental illnesses. The applied definitions became idiosyncratic, stressing individual unconscious roots. This made applying the DSM unreliable across psychiatrists. No distinction between abnormal to normal was established.

Evidence of the classification ambiguity were punctuated by the Rosenhan experiment of 1972. This experiment demonstrated that the methodology of psychiatric diagnosis could not effectively distinguish normal from disordered mentalities. DSM-II labelled 'excessive' behavioral and emotional response as an index of abnormal mental wellness to diagnose some particular disorders. 'Excessiveness' of a reaction implied alternative normal behavior which would have to include a situational factor in evaluation. As an example, a year of intense grief from the death of a spouse may be a normal appropriate response. To have intense grief for twenty years would be indicative of a mental disorder. As well, to grieve intensely over the loss of a sock would also not be considered normal responsiveness and indicate a mental disorder. The consideration of proportionality to stimuli was a perceived strength in psychiatric diagnosis for the DSM-II.

Another characteristic of the DSM-II systemization was that it classified homosexuality as a mental disorder. Thus, homosexuality was psychiatrically defined as a pathological deviation from "normal" sexual development. In the 7th printing of the DSM-II, "homosexuality" was replaced with "sexual orientation disturbance." The intent was to have a label that applied only to homosexual individuals who were bothered by their sexual orientation. In this manner homosexuality would not be viewed as an atypical mental disorder; only if it was distressing would it be classified as a mental illness. However, the DSM-II did not state that homosexuality was normal, either, and a diagnosis of distress related to one's sexual orientation was retained in all editions of the DSM until the DSM-5 in 2013, under different names.

==== DSM-III ====
DSM-III was a best attempt to credit psychiatry as a scientific discipline from the opprobrium resulting from DSM-II. A reduction in the psychodynamic etiologies of DSM-II spilled over into a reduction symptom etiology altogether. Thus, DSM-III was a specific set of definitions for mental illnesses, and entities more suited to diagnostic psychiatry, but which annexed response proportionality as a classification factor. The product was that all symptoms, whether normal proportional response or inappropriate pathological tendencies, could both be treated as potential signs of mental illness.

==== DSM-IV ====
DSM-IV explicitly distinguishes mental disorders and non-disordered conditions. A non-disordered condition results from, and is perpetuated by, social stressors. Included in DSM-IV's classification is that a mental disorder "must not be merely an expectable and culturally sanctioned response to a particular event, for example, the death of a loved one. Whatever its original cause, it must currently be considered a manifestation of a behavioral, psychological, or biological dysfunction in the individual" (American Psychiatric Association 2000:xxxi) This had supposedly injected normality consideration back into the DSM, from its removal from DSM-II. However, it has been speculated that DSM-IV still does not escape the problems DSM-III faced, where psychiatric diagnoses still include symptoms of expectable responses to stressful circumstances to be signs of disorders, along with symptoms that are individual dysfunctions. The example set by DSM-III, for principally symptom-based disorder classification, has been integrated as the norm of mental diagnostic practice.

==== DSM-5 ====
The DSM-5 was released in the second half of 2013. It has significant differences from DSM IV-TR, including the removal of the multi-axial classifications and reconfiguring the Asperger's/autistic spectrum classifications.

==== Criticisms of diagnostics ====
Since the advent of DSM-III, the subsequent editions of the DSM have all included a heavy symptom based pathology diagnosis system. Although there have been some attempts to incorporate environmental factors into mental and behavioral diagnostics, many practitioners and scientists believe that the most recent DSM's are misused. The symptom bias makes diagnosing quick and easier allowing for practitioners to increase their clientele because symptoms can be easier to classify and deal with than dealing with life or event histories which have evoked what may be a temporary and normal mental state in reaction to a patient's environmental circumstances.

The easy-to-use manual not only has increased the perceived need for more mental health care, stimulating funding for mental health care facilities, but also has had a global impact on marketing strategies. Many pharmaceutical commercial ads list symptoms such as fatigue, depression, or anxiety. However, such symptoms are not necessarily abnormal, and are appropriate responses to such occurrences as the loss of a loved one. The targets of such ads in such cases do not need medication and can naturally overcome their grief, but with such an advertising strategy pharmaceutical companies can greatly expand their marketing.

== See also ==
- Abnormality (behavior)
- Attitude change
- Deviance (sociology)
- Eccentricity (behavior)
- Social norm
- Masking (behavior)
