= Prostitution in American Samoa =

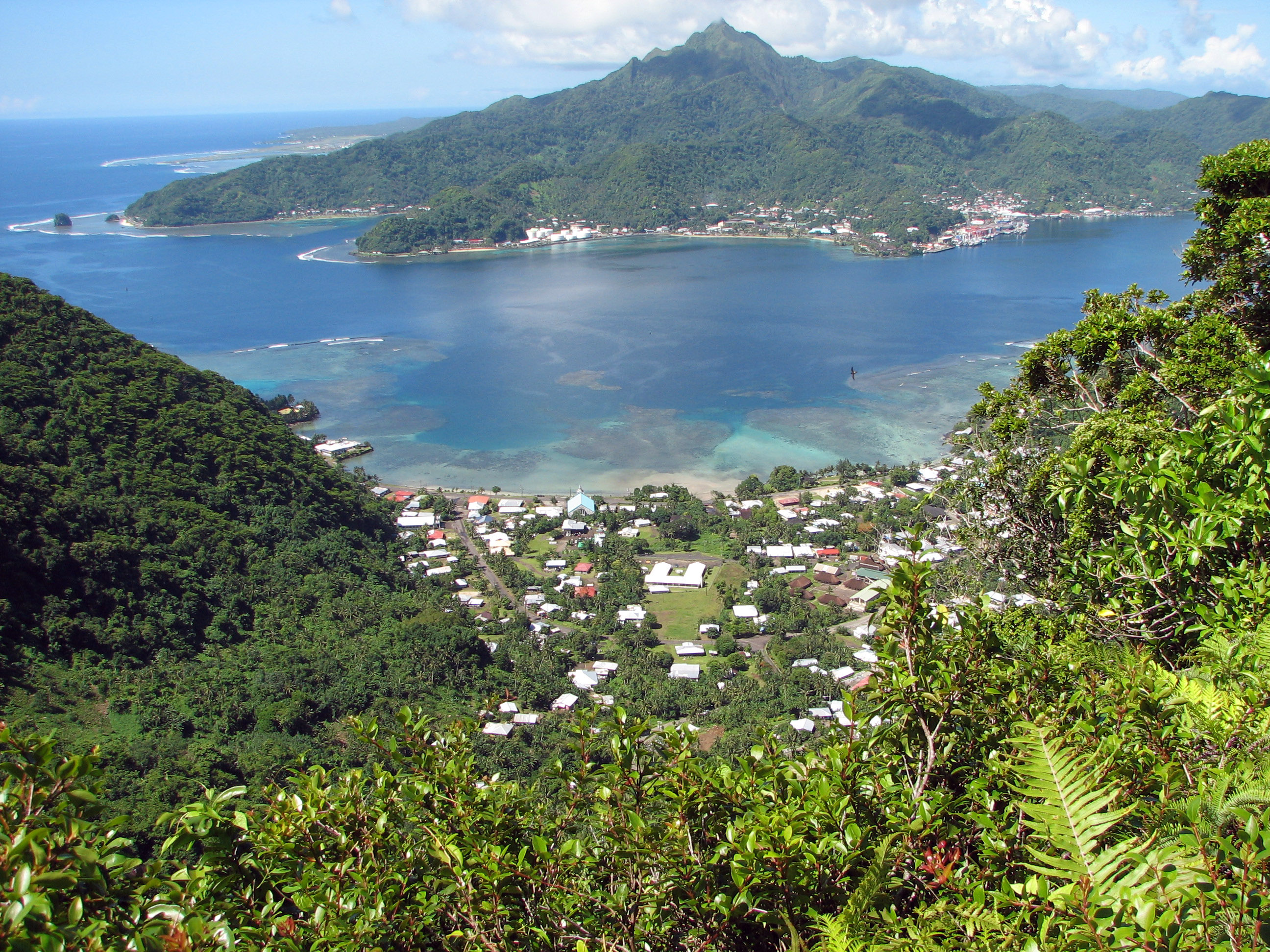
Pago Pago Harbor, Tutuila Island, American Samoa

Prostitution in American Samoa is illegal, as are related activities such as brothel keeping and pimping. These acts are punishable by law, including a fine of more than $500 or a jail sentence of up to a year for customers of prostitution. Prostitution occurs in bars and nightclubs, and in boats moored in the harbours.

W. Somerset Maugham's short story Rain about a missionary trying to get a prostitute to give up her ways is based on Maugham's visit to American Samoa's capital Pago Pago in 1916.

== Legislation ==
Although an Unincorporated territory of the United States, American Samoa is self-governing and has its own laws.

Chapter 37 of Title 46 (Criminal Justice) of the American Samoa Code legislates against prostitution and related activities:

- 46.3701 Definitions. (defines terms used in the legislation)
- 46.3702 Prostitution. (criminalises the act of prostitution)
- 46.3703 Patronizing prostitution. (criminalises purchase of sex)
- 46.3704 Prostitution and patronizing prostitution - Sex of parties no defense (makes offences gender neutral)
- 46.3705 Promoting prostitution in the first degree. (criminalises forced prostitution and child prostitution)
- 46.3706 Promoting prostitution in the second degree. (criminalises pimping, procuring and brothel keeping)
- 46.3707 Prostitution houses considered public nuisances. (gives courts the power to close premises used for prostitution for up to a year)

== Sex trafficking ==
Young women from nearby Samoa are brought to the island, often through family connections, for domestic chores and are subsequently subjected to sex trafficking.

In 2007, five Chinese nationals were jailed for trafficking Chinese women into the country to work as prostitutes in bars and nightclubs. The two ringleaders were sentenced to 62 and 63 months imprisonment. The victims had their passports taken away, weren't paid, and weren't allowed to leave until they had paid off their ever-increasing debts.

Law enforcement officers raided the U.S. territory's Office of Immigration in January 2010. It was alleged that in the previous 6 months immigration officials had waived through trafficking victims without performing the required checks on people entering the country. Possibly hundreds of victims were brought through in this manner during the period. The women being used by a prostitution ring.

The Government of American Samoa introduced specific law to combat human trafficking. The legislation was further strengthened in 2014.

== See also ==
- Prostitution in the United States
