= Trafficking of Korean women in the United States =

Trafficking of Korean women in the United States has been practiced for over a few decades and is known to be a transnational social problem. These women have either been kidnapped, groomed, recruited and usually transported to domestic and or foreign lands by use of threats, coercion, fraud or physical and verbal abuse. Korean women have been sexually exploited, forced to commit strenuous labor, and to transport illegal products, such as drugs, that are smuggled by use of their bodies in some cases. Trafficking of Korean women has been practiced since the late 1930s in Asia. Victims can range from pre-teen years of age to their thirties or later. Korean women are often stigmatized in the United States as being women who are in the states as sex workers. Over time, U.S. contributions toward combatting human trafficking amongst Korean women have been issued. Law enforcement agencies and several departments of the U.S. government have provided these women a way out of the trafficking culture, whether they identify as voluntary or involuntary sex workers. As Korean women, their identity plays a unique role in how different forms of systematic oppression affects them.

South Korean women have been found to be victims of sex trafficking in the United States. They have been exploited in places such as massage parlors, beauty salons, bars, restaurants, and escort services. U.S. government reports have stated that some women were forced to work to pay off debts. Earlier government reports also listed the United States as one of several foreign countries where South Korean women were forced into prostitution.

== Background ==
In the mid-2000s, U.S. federal investigations uncovered organized groups that brought South Korean women into the United States for prostitution. In 2005, authorities charged members of a group called the Jung Organization with running a scheme that allegedly brought hundreds of South Korean women into the country to work in brothels. According to the U.S. Department of Justice, some women used fake visitor visas to enter the country, while others were secretly brought across the borders from Canada or Mexico. The group allegedly provided women to brothel owners who operated businesses disguised as massage parlors and escort services.

In 2006, another federal investigation uncovered a large network of brothels owned by Koreans. These businesses operated from Rhode Island to Washington, D.C. The investigation found that the network included recruiters in South Korea, middlemen, and people responsible for transporting women to North America and into the United States. Federal prosecutors said that some women entered the country using fake immigration documents, while others were first taken to Canada or Mexico and then secretly brought across the U.S. border.

== Entertainment and trafficking in the U.S. ==
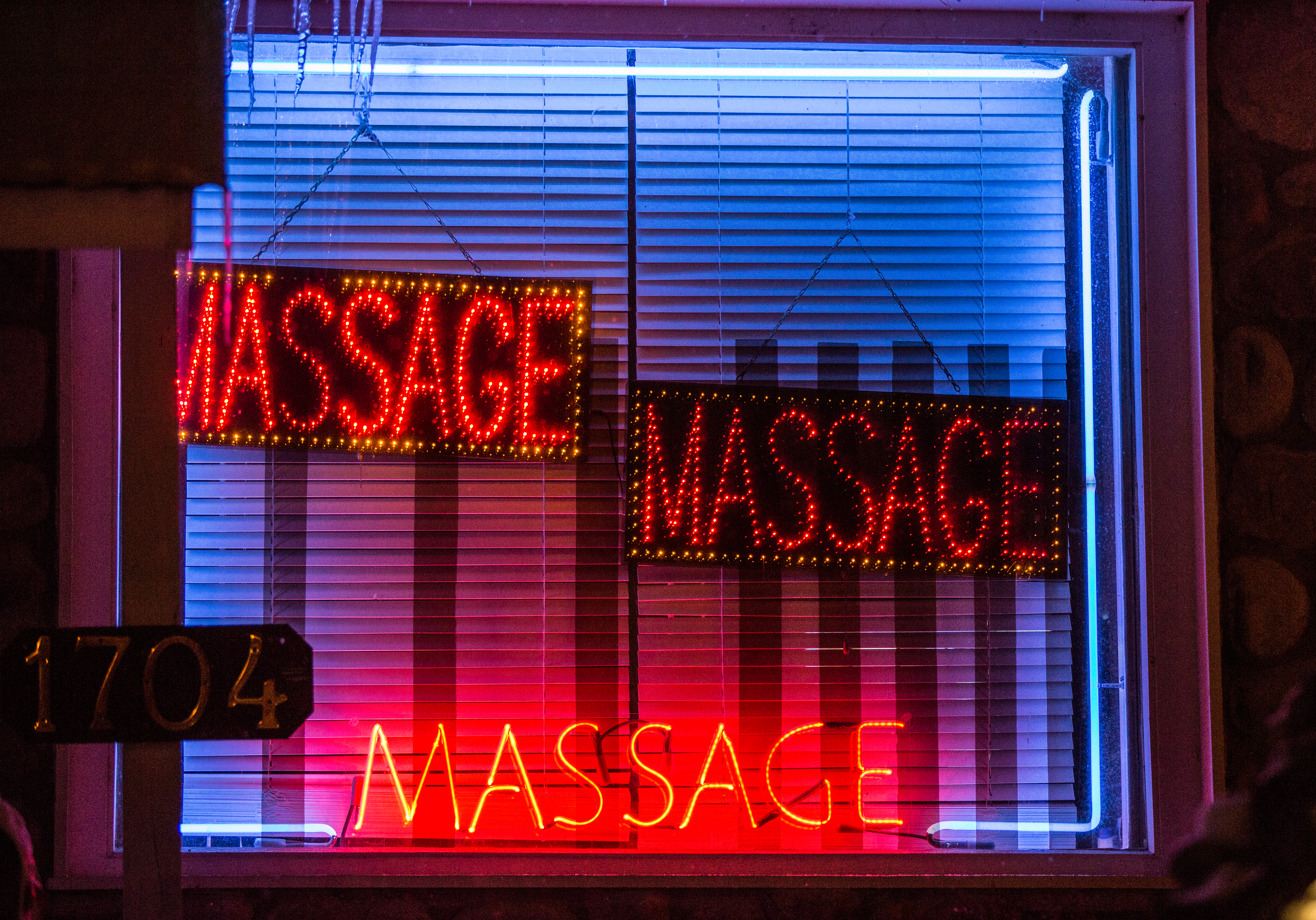
Aside from brothels, massage parlors are one of the most lucrative locations for Korean sexual exploitation.

Profits from human trafficking, which includes the smuggling of drugs by use of human bodies, sex trafficking, and trafficking for labor purposes, annually generates over one hundred billion dollars in revenue. So, where supply must meet demand in the U.S., the supply of Korean sex workers must meet the demand in Korean entertainment in the U.S. The entertainment culture for Koreans is heavily tied with the sex industry. For the Korean entertainment community, trafficking acts to shape levels of socioeconomic status. In karaoke clubs and bars, women pose as hostesses, accompanied by other men, who drink plenty of alcohol to have a good time. These hostesses are not obligated to provide commercial sex there, but in hotel or motel rooms. Commercial sex for these workers is an additional fee for their service. For masseurs, whom occupy the 'middle-class', their work is performed in massage parlors or teahouses. These women are summoned for their massage service and also asked to provide commercial sex. Lastly lies the 'low-class' of Korean women in the entertainment business in America, prostitutes. Street prostitutes solicit sex in urban red-light districts, and receive the lowest pay out of the group. In order for the Korean entertainment to flourish, there must be a substantial amount of supply for the demand.

== U.S. anti-human trafficking laws and Korean trafficking ==
Due to an increase in immigrants from Korea, ever since the Korean government liberalized overseas travel in 1989, trafficking of Korean women has risen. The Victims of Trafficking Violence Protection Act (2000), also known as the TVPA, was issued years later, resulting in a significant amount of convictions since the cracking down of investigations that surfaced on human trafficking. This would put together protecting victims, preventing the culture of trafficking from thriving, and prosecuting traffickers. The TVPA paved the way for the Department of State to take charge of reporting an annual Trafficking in Persons (TIP) to form efforts in combatting human trafficking. This also applied to the administration of the presidency. These mandates would force task forces to measure and evaluate the progression of combatting human trafficking globally.

It was not until 2005 that human trafficking would become revealed to the mainstream media. The FBI and other law enforcement agencies raided over fifty Korean brothels and parlors in Los Angeles and San Francisco, CA. 150 sex workers were detained, and 45 smugglers were arrested and charged with money laundering, sex trafficking, and harboring immigrants. This event birthed the view of Korean sex workers as involuntary sex slaves. It was during the Clinton Administration that agencies of the U.S. government then worked to combat trafficking nationally and abroad. The U.S. Department of Health and Human Services produced statistical data and analysis on persons being trafficked and issued federally funded relief to those victims.

As for the U.S. Department of Homeland Security, they provide a parole probationary period for victims while they stay in the U.S. This acts as an incentive for trafficking victims to comply with law enforcement authorities during trafficking cases. This temporary immigration benefit is also called 'Continued Presence', enacted by DHS and ICE. As victims, Korean sex workers are entitled to rights under the U.S. law. Korean and United States officials continued to grapple with the surplus of Korean population migrating to the states. This was the effect of Korea's Anti-Prostitution Act of 2004 and the United States' Visa Waiver Program enacted in 2008. Korea would go on to add more consequences and punishment for sex workers and prostitutes, oblivious to the sex workers that are being trafficked against their will.

In 2007, The Civil Rights Division of the Department of Justice established the Human Trafficking Prosecution Unit(HTPU) in order to strengthen the knowledge of elite human trafficking prosecutors. To protect victims even further, the Civil Rights Division provides social work services, medical services and shelter. The federal agencies and division would proceed to make revisions to the TVPA in order to fulfill the promise of prevention, protection and prosecution against human trafficking.

== Intersections of oppression ==
In a historical context, trafficked Korean women faced multiple intersections of oppression. Even today, some of the barriers of systematic oppression that may still affect them include colonialism, sexism, classism, immigration status, and language. Language can act as a barrier when emigrating to the United States or other foreign countries that do not place or rank the Korean language as one of their primary languages spoken.

Colonialism

- The Korean people went under Japanese rule after Japan defeated Korea in the Pacific War (1931–1945). Japanese soldiers forced "comfort women" to accompany them to prevent mass rapes within the colony.

Sexism

- As "comfort women," they were vulnerable to patriarchal power within their authoritative government and lifestyle culture. In Korean culture, gender roles are very distinct between men and women. Both are given work roles to fulfill without choice or question. Worker rights are, in a sense, non-existent.

Classism

- The majority of these women are of low-class status, not married and live in impoverished and rural areas of Korea. Poverty plays a major role for traffickers and makes it accessible for them to collect hundreds of women and girls for the purpose of labor and commercial sexual exploitation, and illegal drug trafficking.

Language and immigration

- As trafficked poor women coming into the United States, Korean women have the additional barrier of not understanding the native English language. These women must rely on their owners and managers to provide them necessities, for managers are more familiar and often fluent in the English language. These women, essentially, do not have social access to the outside world away from human trafficking. Their every move is studied and scripted. Without effective communication in the U.S., language can be viewed as disabling in this circumstance. When it comes to immigration, managers, traffickers, and owners are more likely to possess a legitimate citizenship, whereas the women who are trafficked and those not trafficked possess visas, and/or are undocumented immigrants.

== Federal and non-governmental activism ==
- International Justice Mission
- International Rescue Committee
- The United States Department of Justice
- The United States Department of Labor
- The United States Department of State
- Polaris Project
- UNICEF

== See also ==
- Contemporary slavery in the United States
- Human trafficking in the United States
- Human trafficking in North Korea
- Human trafficking in South Korea
- Human trafficking in Southeast Asia
- Violence against women
- Sex Worker's Rights Movement
