= Porcelain Palace =

Public toilet complex in Chongqing, China

Coordinates: 29.612°N 106.597°E

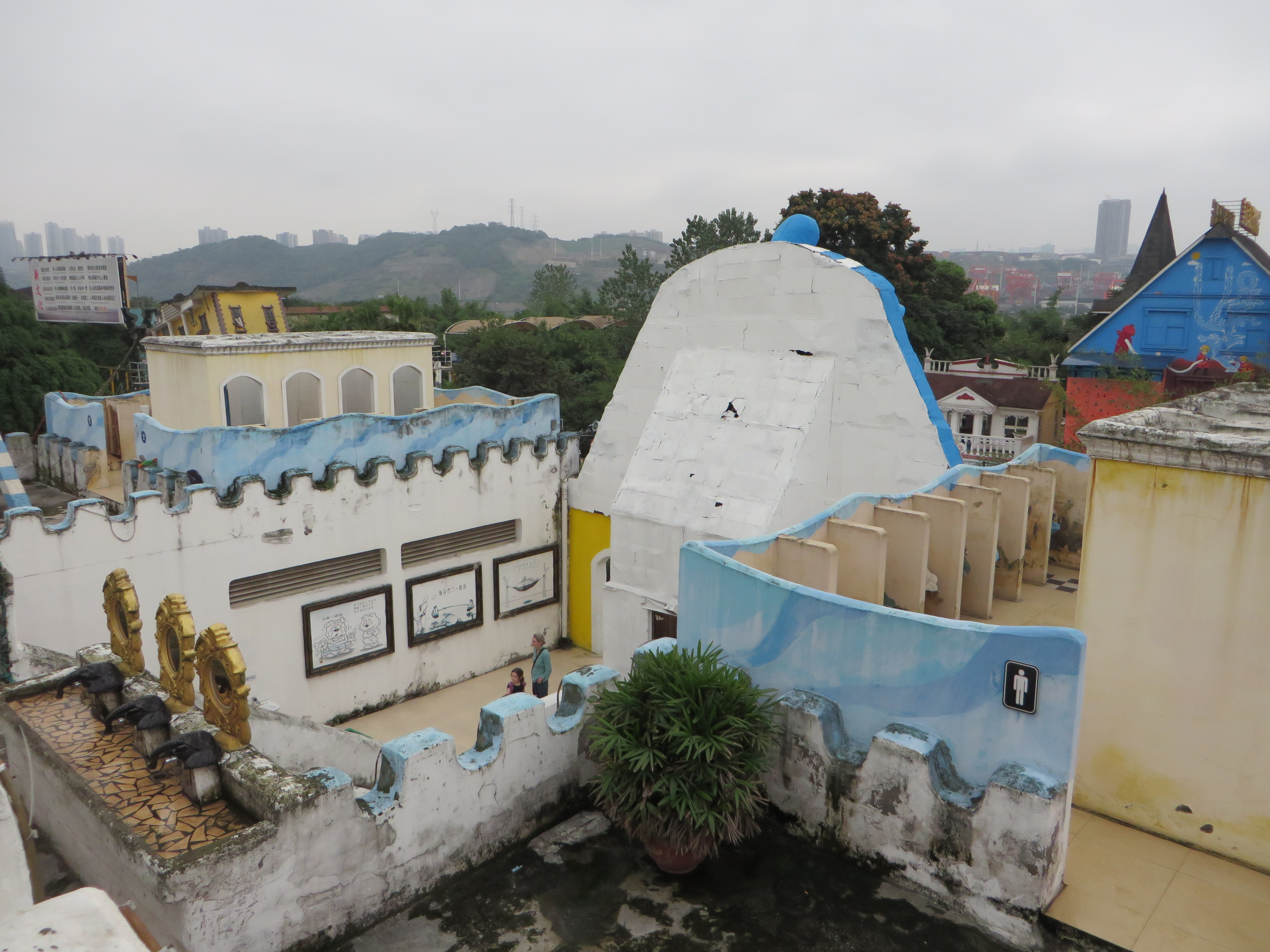
View of the Porcelain Palace at Foreigners' Street.

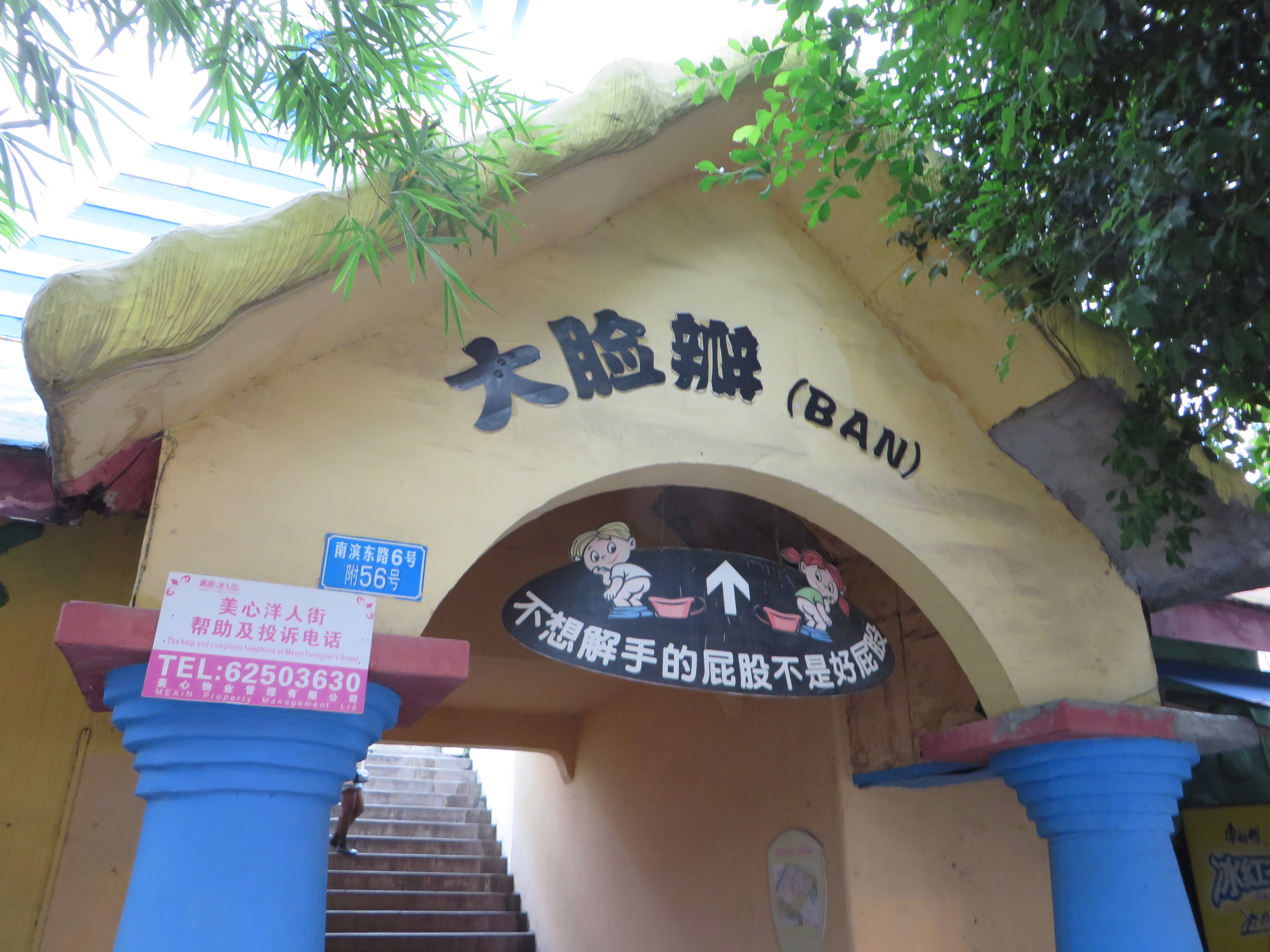
Entrance to the Porcelain Palace.

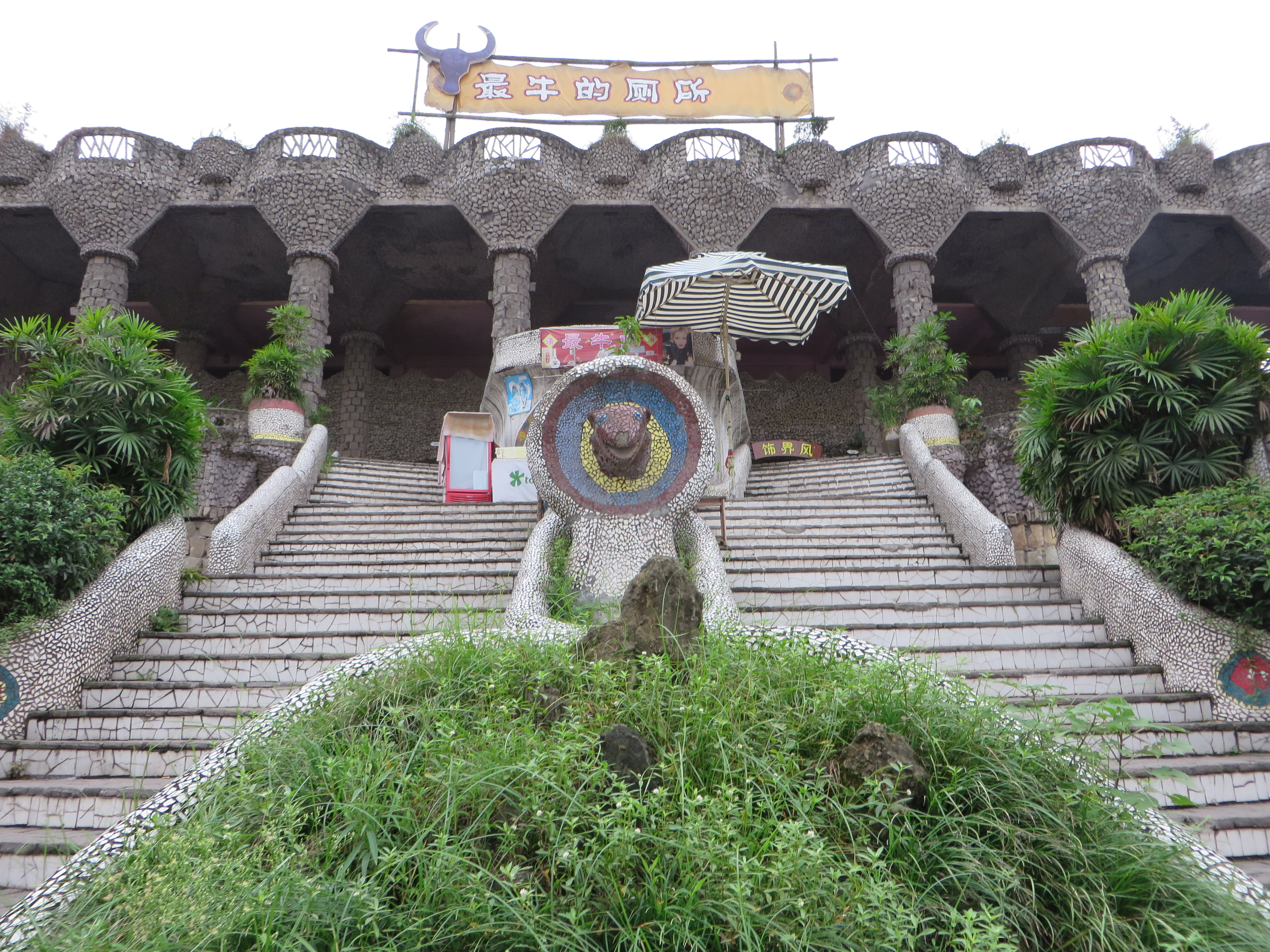
Gaudi-style entrance of the toilet complex to the south of the main Porcelain Palace.

Porcelain Palace is a large public toilet complex at the Foreigners' Street amusement park in the city of Chongqing, China.

The facade of the complex was inspired by ancient Egyptian art. A toilet complex to the south is in the distinctive style of the Spanish Catalan architect Antoni Gaudi. The complex contains a total of more than 1,000 toilets and urinals making it the largest toilet complex in the world.

The massive toilet edifice is more than 3,000 square metres (32,000 sq ft) in size and has been submitted by Chinese authorities to the Guinness Book of World Records.

The Porcelain Palace has been purged of artworks and facilities seen as vulgar by the Chinese authorities. The Love Land sex theme park attraction would have been near the Porcelain Palace and Foreigners' Street. This was due to be opened in 2009, but was demolished by the authorities before it actually opened.
