= Ma Xiaohai =

Ma Xiaohai (Chinese: 马尧海) is a former computer science professor at Nanjing Tech University arrested in 2009 for organising wife-swapping events. He was sentenced to 3.5 years in jail, "a more severe punishment because he did not admit the malicious and illegal nature of his conduct," according to the court. His arrest and prosecution became the topic of discussion around sexual freedom in China.

== Background ==
Ma graduated from Zhejiang University in 1978 and was admitted to a master's degree program at Harbin Institute of Technology in 1986. In November 1994 he transferred to Nanjing Tech University.

Ma was divorced twice before he started participating in partner-swapping.

At the time of the prosecution, Ma was 53 years old and working as a professor of computer science at Nanjing Tech University.

== Swinging and prosecution ==
Ma first experimented with swinging in 2004.

He started an online chatroom called “Independent Travel for Husbands, Wives and Lovers” in 2007.

In the alleged "swingers trial" in Nanjing, Jiangsu Province, he was the only one among 21 defendants to have pleaded "not guilty" to accusations of "group licentiousness" (聚众淫乱罪). The activities took place from 2007, and from September 2009 he was under police surveillance.

Ma was defended online by renowned Chinese sexologist Li Yinhe.

Because of the prosecution, Ma resigned from his position at Nanjing Technical University.

== See also ==
- Harmonious society
- Sexuality in China
