= Sexuality in China =

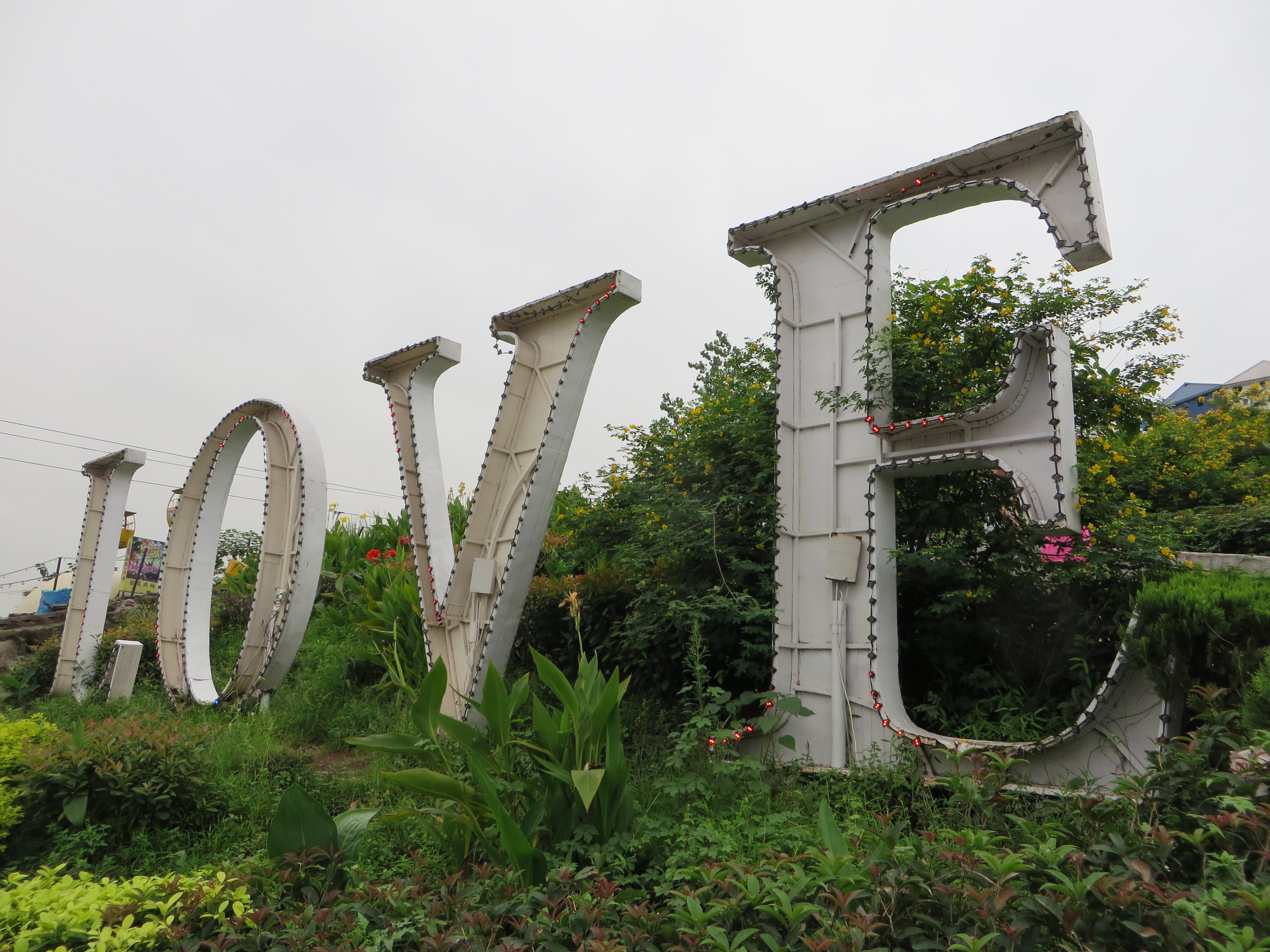
"Love" sign at Foreigners' Street theme park in Chongqing, southwest China, location of the aborted Love Land sex theme park

Sexuality in China has undergone dramatic changes throughout time. These changes can be categorized as "sexual revolution". Chinese sexual attitudes, behaviors, ideology, and relations have especially gone through dramatic shifts in the past four decades due to the reform and opening up of the country. Many of these changes have found expression in the public forum through a variety of behaviors and ideas. These include, but are not limited to the following cultural shifts: a separation of sex and marriage, such as pre- and extramarital sex; a separation of sex from love and child-bearing such as internet sex and one-night stands; an increase in observable sexual diversity such as homo- and bisexual behavior and fetishism; an increase in socially acceptable displays and behaviors of female sexual desire; a boom in the sex industry; and a more open discussion of sex topics, including sex studies at colleges, media reports, formal publications, online information, extensive public health education, and public displays of affection.

As can be seen by these developments, China no longer exerts strict control over personal sexual behavior. Sex is increasingly considered something personal and can now be differentiated from a traditional system that featured legalized marital sex and legal controls over childbirth. The reduction in controls on sexual behavior has initiated a freer atmosphere for sexual expression. More and more people now regard sexual rights as basic human rights, so that everyone has the right and freedom to pursue their own sexual bliss.

Change in the field of sexuality reveals not only a change of sexual attitudes and behaviors but also a series of related social changes via the process of social transformation. From the sociological perspective, there have been several main factors that have created the current turning point in the contemporary Chinese social context.

== Contemporary history ==
Since the early 1980s sex and sexuality have become prominent themes of public debate in China, after three decades of Maoist rule during which discourses on sexuality were subject to stringent ideological controls.

=== Market reform and opening-up policy ===
The denial of the ideals of the Cultural Revolution, during which sex was used as a political tool to control people, is an influential factor in making changes in Chinese society. During the Cultural Revolution, individual sexual preferences were supposed to give way to lofty revolutionary ideals. Extramarital affairs were portrayed as a degenerate lifestyle, and consensual pre-marital sex was immoral. Homosexuality was illegal and would be punished under the statutes for hooliganism. A person had to be sexually well-behaved in order to get a promotion or advance in their career.

Reforms in the area of sexuality show a lessening amount of government control over individuals' private life. Many sex-related issues and personal lifestyles are no longer relegated to the field of politics and thus exempt from severe legal punishment or moral condemnation. Sex has been returned to the personal sphere under the domain of self-management. These changes can be seen in the weakened interference and control of the government in sex-related areas, strengthened sexual resources in the open market, a diversity of sexual lifestyles, and a strong appeal for sexual rights as human rights.

For instance, the government's control of personal lives has gradually retreated since the passing of the new marriage registration principles in October 2003, which again simplified the processes of marriage and divorce. The committed parties no longer need certification or confirmation from their place of work or the local Resident Committee to get married or divorced. The pre-marital physical, which among other things once contained an indication of the woman's virginity, is no longer obligatory. The new principles reflect a greater respect for human rights, a protection of marital freedom, and a change in the governmental function with regards to sexual issues.

At the same time, some major social policies have also played an important part. For example, the side effect of the family planning policy is to promote a separation of sexual behavior from reproductive purposes. If a couple can give birth to one child only, sexual behavior is no longer solely practiced to produce babies but also for pleasure. Changes in the legal code have reflected this while also publicly acknowledging sex as a pursuit of happiness.

=== Stable economic development and consumerism ===
Under recent policies, the social economy has seen stable and sustainable growth, especially in big cities. Material wealth and an increase in quality of life have brought optimism and consumerism which continually send messages to the individual that it is acceptable to seek sexual happiness.

Various sex products are now openly sold in the market. Sexual information is spreading directly or indirectly through such public media as street-side advertising. Fewer people turn away when they see intimate behavior between lovers in public. Condom vending machines are seen on campuses. Products for safe sex are available in convenience stores around city. Even major radio and television stations have started picking up on sex-related topics. Educational programs on sex have become popular. Video shops, big or small, sell sexually oriented films produced either by domestic or foreign directors. More sexual information can also be quickly and easily found on the Internet. Intermingled information, good or bad, has pushed aside many of the traditional sexual taboos and thus shaken the norm of sexual practice.

=== Growth of the middle class ===
One very important factor driving the social change in contemporary China is the great changes in and reorganization of social stratification. One of the most important features is white collar workers — the rise of the new middle class in China. The new middle class tends to stress their personal happiness and pay more attention to their own quality of life. Goods such as lifestyle magazines are priced according to the income of the target audience. These include pinwei magazines which market high quality or luxury goods, men's health magazines which promote muscled physiques, and erotic magazines depicting both men and women.

Based on observations, all the visible changes in sexual discourse — including those in gay culture — can be considered a part of middle class culture. Most of the related website owners and participants belong to the white collar workers group. The new lifestyle in sexuality fields such as the DINK — "double income, no kids"—family, single groups, and cohabitating couples who violate the traditional sex norms are led by middle-class people. They are also the target groups for most gay bars, dating parties, so-called "dating on Saturday" programs, and sports groups, among others, in cities.

The rise and growth of this middle class has the potential to produce various sexual emancipation discourses, including homosexuality, to break the silence in Chinese society.

=== Globalization ===
Since China adopted the policies of opening up and market reform, globalization has meant that there have been many people traveling across countries and from one region to another in China. It means information sharing, product sharing, capital flow, and value sharing, which increasingly includes some basic understanding of sexual rights, gender equality, and human rights. The country's various projects on sexuality, reproductive health, and AIDS prevention each have raised people's awareness of sexuality. Some non-profit international or national organizations are also working in China, while at the same time the international academic community, together with Chinese scholars, is sponsoring workshops and conferences for research on sexuality.

== Popularization of higher education ==
Popularization of higher education has become one of the major changes in Chinese education. According to recent statistics publicized by the Shanghai Education Commission, the gross entrance rate into higher education in Shanghai is 55 percent, ranking first in the country. Beijing comes a close second, at 53 percent. In the same year, the nation's gross entrance rate into higher education has not yet reached 19 percent. More than half of the population aged 18 to 22 in Shanghai and Beijing can get access to some form of higher education.

The impact of higher education has been significant. The younger generation may adopt a different sexual ideology from the older generation because they have more opportunities to get exposure to humanities and social sciences. They are more geared toward the pursuit of equality, freedom, and self-realization. At the same time, society pays more and more attention to elite intellectuals such as professors, researchers, lawyers, and policy-making consultants. Their opinions and ideas are expressed to the public in media reports and at conferences. The spreading of knowledge has been the most influential way to eliminate sex discrimination and sex inequality.

== Feminist discourse in China ==
The Fourth UN Conference on Women was held in Beijing in 1995. The government sponsored the conference and then signed the UN documents pledging gender equality, and official women's organizations and feminist activists and scholars have been fighting against gender discrimination and working on achieving gender equality. Their struggle has permeated many aspects of the people's social lives.

Mainstream feminist discourse in China tends to ignore sexuality issues, considering those topics either unimportant or as stirring up unnecessary trouble. Nevertheless, the critical thinking of feminist discourse has challenged stereotyped gender roles, including sexuality roles. The latter especially has influenced many young people.

Feminist discourse in sexuality aims to redefine women's roles in sexual contexts. It critiques traditional double standards governing sexual behavior, challenging norms that prescribe men to be assertive and proactive while portraying women as passive and inert. These standards include expectations of men having stronger sexual desires compared to women, and societal norms surrounding sexual experience and virginity. Feminist discourse also addresses inequalities in sexual expectations, advocating for women to assert their desires and prioritize their own satisfaction in sexual encounters. The critical feminist discourse is also rewriting gender views in Chinese society. Some feminist scholars have started to emphasize women's sexual rights and the diversity of sexuality among Chinese women. Thus, China's sexual revolution is also a women's sexual revolution, as evidenced by these trends.

While women in previous generations were expected to marry in their twenties, many highly educated women are deciding to hold off on marriage into their 30s or longer. Their increased economic power has given them autonomy so they don't need to rely on a spouse. But the Chinese media has still given them a derogatory name, shengnu (剩女) or "leftover women".

In 2005, China added new provisions to the Law on Women's Right Protection to include sexual harassment. In 2006 "The Shanghai Supplement" was drafted to help further define sexual harassment in China.

== Role of the media and the Internet ==
The media serves as a catalytic agent for the sexual revolution in China. The internet, in particular, stands out as one of the most influential agents, exerting significant impact on the Chinese population by fostering alliances, sharing knowledge, and offering a platform for diverse voices to be heard. Many individuals have embraced their sexual identities largely due to the Internet. It serves as a potent channel for people to connect with sexual partners, coordinate offline activities, or simply access sexual knowledge and information.

The Internet has also played a significant role in promoting lesbian, gay, bisexual, and transgender (LGBT) identities in China. Since the late 1990s, members of the LGBT community have utilized the Internet to access and share information, build relationships, and foster queer identities and communities. However, despite the apparent growth of the LGBT community in the global online sphere, there are constraints. Some constraints are influenced by socio-economic factors. Certain gay, lesbian, and queer individuals may lack the financial means to own a computer and have home Internet access, leading them to rely on Internet cafes where they may need to avoid specific websites to evade monitoring by others. Other constraints are politically motivated. Websites catering to the gay and lesbian community often have short lifespans due to government internet regulations and controls. Additionally, despite the increasing online presence of LGBT identities, the community remains marginalized within China's dominant discourse on sexuality. Traditional Chinese media outlets seldom acknowledge LGBT identities, let alone support and validate the community.

== Sexual revolution ==
In Chinese language, xingkaifang (性开放) is the phrase to describe the sexual opening-up, "a globalizing sexual culture prevailing China." Urbanization in China has been accelerating the sexual revolution by providing people with more private space and freedom to enjoy sex, as compared with what was afforded by the traditional countryside way of life. The Internet provides even more powerful support and makes it possible for many people to remain anonymous, to surf the Internet from one website to another, to write their own blogs, and to express what they want in an environment where there is much less prying by co-workers, neighbors, or other peer groups and less judgments put upon their behavior. However, Internet censorship in China does remain an issue. Chinese government has successfully blocked activists from participating political discourse on the internet.

== Government interventions ==
=== The "Group Licentiousness" law ===
The PRC Government still regulates sexuality to a greater degree than the governments of Western countries. In 2010, Ma Xiaohai, a 53-year-old computer science professor, was sentenced to 3 1/2 years in prison for organising wife-swapping events, breaking the "group licentiousness law" (聚众淫乱罪).

=== Opposition to the Love Land theme park in Chongqing ===
The proposed Love Land sex theme park in Chongqing, southwest China, was never opened due to government pressure. The PRC Government suspended its construction in May 2009 and ordered it demolished for being vulgar and explicit. The park was to include displays of giant genitalia and naked bodies, and host an exhibition on the history of human sexuality along with sex technique workshops. The closure is a reflection of the conservatism with regard to sex in China. The theme park was originally due to be opened in October 2009, but was demolished earlier that year, since it was deemed to be a negative influence on Chinese society.

== AIDS and sexuality ==
The importance of AIDS prevention in China has been stressed by both the global society and the Chinese government. Such an increase in concern can be a double-edged sword for the sexual revolution in China. It provides both opportunities and risks. Sexuality has to be openly discussed because of AIDS concerns. For example, in the summer of 2005, China Central Television discussed the topic of AIDS under the title "Homosexuality: Confronting is Better than Evading." Scholars and activists have gained the legitimacy to talk publicly about the so-called "high risk" groups such as gay men and sex workers and have been developing strategies to work together with the government, replacing strategies of attacking the "evil" with models for caring for those at risk.

Sexuality, including homosexuality, has started to enter the public forum. The whole process is still ongoing, but it is breaking the silence on sexuality taboos. AIDS concerns also bring funding, and many organizations are working to fight the illness. The related knowledge and information on sexuality is spreading continuously among Chinese people, and it also strongly helps people to overcome the stereotypes, bias and ignorance regarding AIDS and sexual health issues.

== See also ==
- Homosexuality and transgender in China
- Prostitution in China
- HIV/AIDS in China
- Feminism in China
- Love Land (China)
- Taoist sexual practices
- Back-up partner
- Pornography in China
