= Love Land (China) =

Cancelled Chinese sex theme park

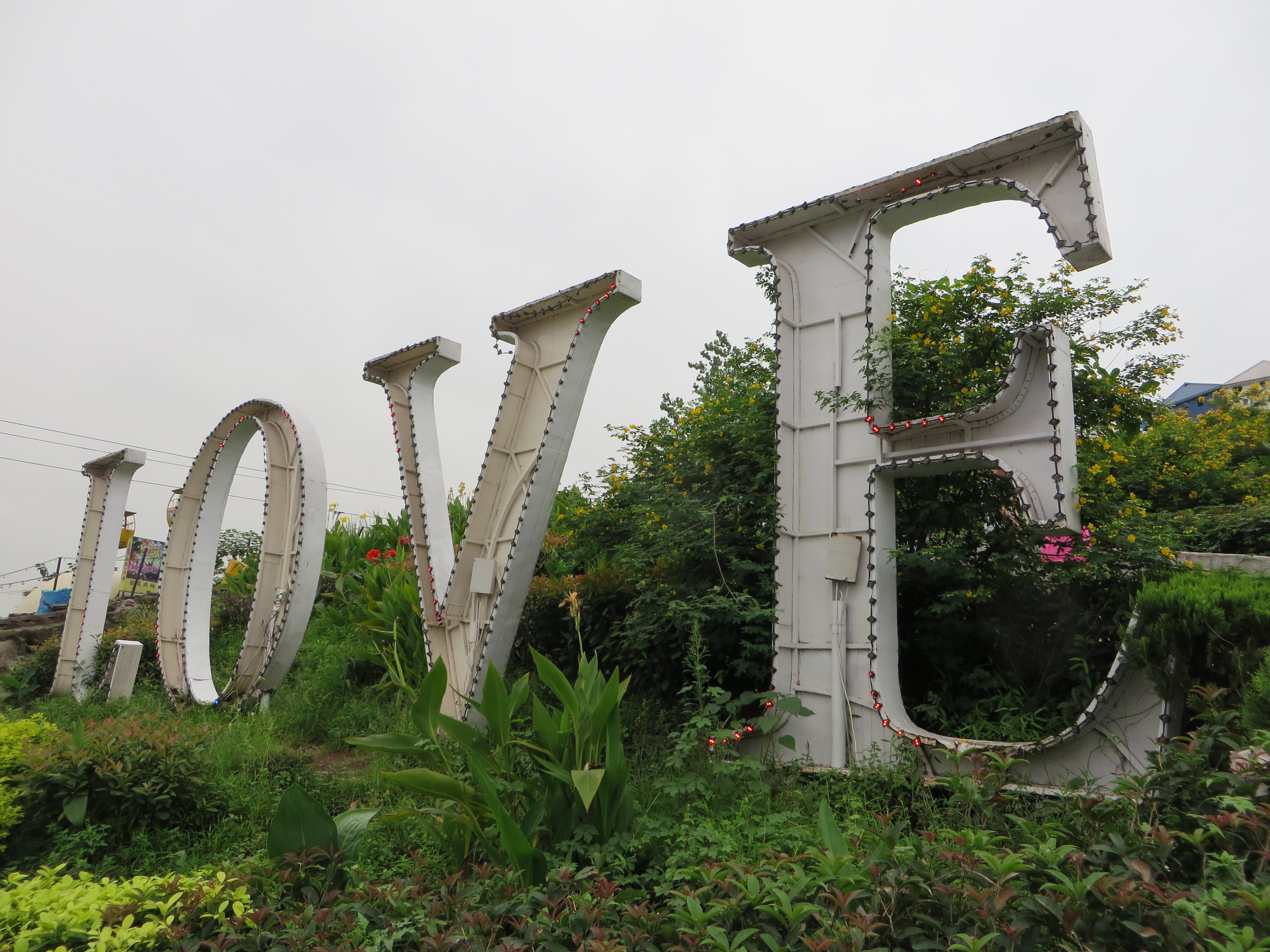
"Love" sign at Foreigners' Street

Love Land (Chinese: 重庆性公园; lit. 'Chongqing sex theme park') would have been the first sex theme park in China; the PRC Government suspended its construction in Chongqing in May 2009 and ordered it demolished for being vulgar and explicit. The park was to include displays of giant genitalia and naked bodies, and host an exhibition on the history of human sexuality along with sex technique workshops.

The theme park was originally due to be opened in October 2009, but was demolished in May 2009, as it was deemed to be a negative influence on Chinese society. The attraction would have been near Foreigners' Street, an amusement park that includes the world's largest toilet, the Porcelain Palace, which itself was purged of anything seen as vulgar by the Chinese authorities.

== See also ==
- Sex museum
- Love Land (South Korea)
- Sexuality in China
