= Slavery on salt farms in Sinan County =

2014 human trafficking case in South Korea

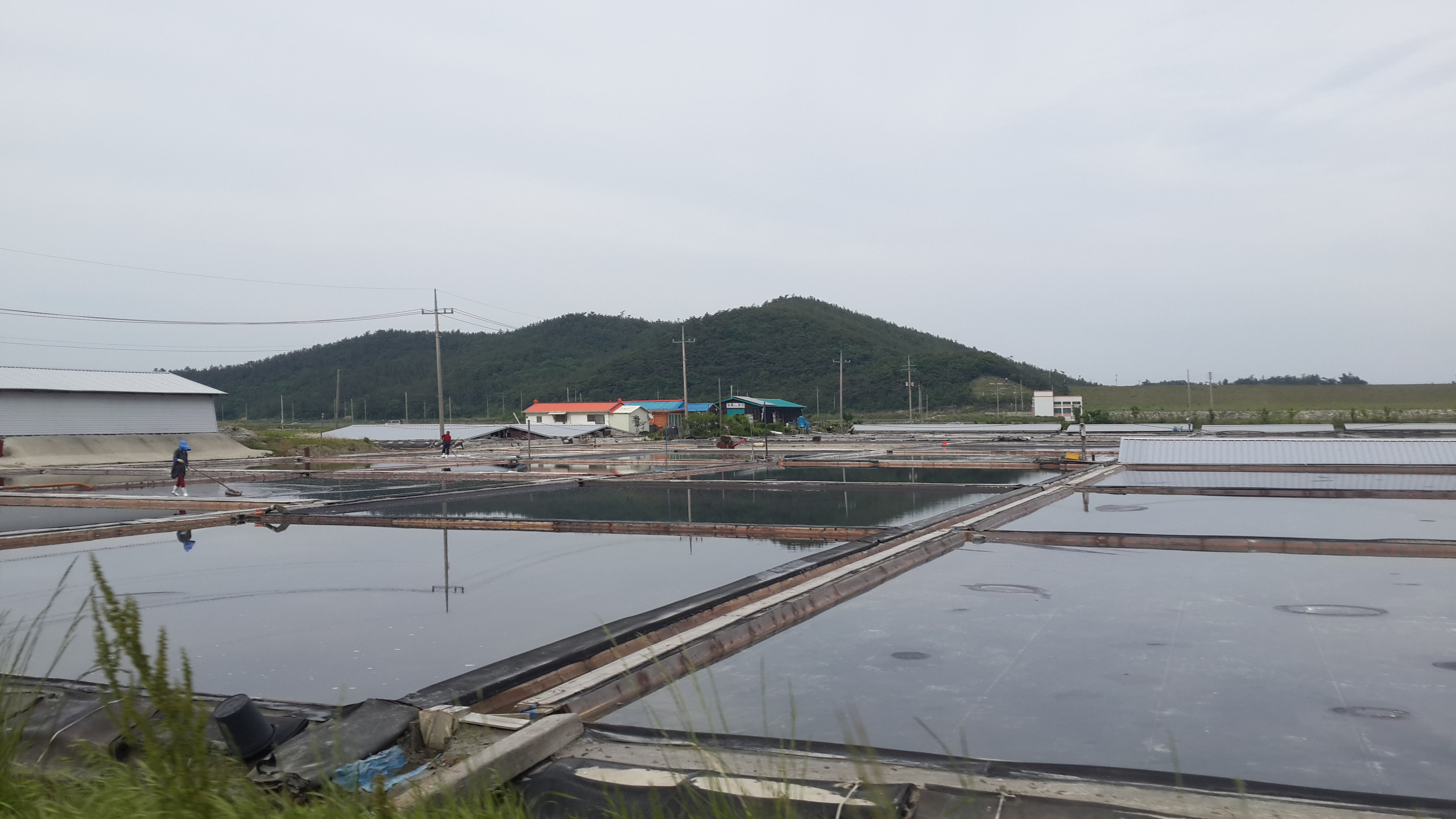
Salt farms such at these in Sinan County enslaved trafficked individuals for work

Slavery on Sinan County's salt farms relates to the discovery of human trafficking cases in Sinan County (신안군), Jeollanam-do (전라남도), South Korea in 2014. It was discovered that individuals, mostly the homeless, were kidnapped and sent to salt farms to work without any compensation.

== Description ==
- Slavery on salt farms in Sinan County
- Hangul: 신안군 염전 섬노예 사건
- Hanja: 新安郡 鹽田 섬奴隷 事件
- Revised Romanization: Sinan-gun yeomjeon seomnoye sageon
- McCune–Reischauer: Sinan-gun yŏmjŏn sŏmnoye sakŏn

Two disabled homeless men (known anonymously by their surnames Kim and Chae) were living in Mokpo and Seoul. An unregistered employment agency told them they could earn money by working on Sinan County's salt farms. Instead, they were sold to a farmer who owned a salt evaporation pond for a million won. Kim was trafficked in 2012, and Chae was trafficked in 2008.

They were forced to work unpaid on a salt evaporation pond in Sineuido, Sinan County. Kim and Chae were forced to work for 14 hours a day; if they did not work well, they were beaten with an iron bar or a wooden club.

Kim attempted to escape the island three times, but all his attempts failed. After his third attempt, Kim was threatened with death should he try again. Soon after, Kim sent a letter to his mother. His mother called the police in Seoul. After that, Kim and Chae were rescued by Seoul police on 6 February 2014. The owner and the unregistered employment agency were arrested by Seoul police. While Kim was reunited with his mother, Chae was not able to live with his family, so he entered a facility for handicapped people.

Most residents living in the islands and cities had helped the abusers to find the victims running away before this matter became an issue in South Korea. The residents included police officers who the victims were desperate to get assistance from.

After the rescue, Jeonnam Mokpo Police Station, Mokpo Branch of Gwangju Ministry of Labor of The Republic of Korea, and Sinan County investigated 140 salt farm workers at Sineuido (신의도), Jeungdo (증도), and Bigeumdo (비금도). The investigators searched all salt farms in Sinan County. The investigation found 18 workers who had not been paid among 140 salt farm workers, two of whom were handicapped. One worker had not been paid for ten years although he should have been paid at least 120,000,000 won.

There are likely even more victims, and most involved in trafficking were sentenced to be jailed for few years with a stay of execution.

Investigations by Korean authorities and independent journalists in 2013 and 2014 discovered around 163 salt farm employees, most of them mentally or physically disabled, who were being held and worked under slave-like conditions. Around 50 island farm owners and regional job brokers were indicted or convicted of related crimes. No government or police officials who were aware of the crimes have been indicted.

Park Yong-chan (박용찬), a party member of the New Politics Alliance for Democracy and a deputy Speaker of the Sinan County council was arrested by the Jeonnam provincial police on 15 April 2014 for failure to pay three labourers who had worked on his salt evaporation pond, whom he should have paid a total of one hundred million won. He was also accused of beating his labourers.

== Criticism about the decision of South Korean court ==
In March 2015, the Seoul High Court sentenced the salt farm owner Mr. Hong to 3 years and 6 months in prison, the same sentence as the lower court. However, it is debatable whether the sentence of 3 years and 6 months is appropriate compared to the heinous crimes suffered by the victim. Regardless of the relative sentence given to the perpetrator Mr. Hong, for the fact that one of the victims, Mr. Choi, was deprived of freedom and lived a life of slavery for over five years, this case involves clear and undeniable evidence that directly applies to the crimes of illegal detention and human trafficking, among others, with more than one victim. Even under South Korean criminal law, a higher sentence could have been imposed, but in this case, excluding assault and other crimes, he could have been sentenced to up to 15 years in prison for labour exploitation alone.

In June 2015, those who lured disabled people and provided them with slave victims were sentenced to 2 years and 6 months or 2 years in prison, respectively. This verdict is being criticised for being relatively light compared to the nature of their crimes, as these individuals already have multiple criminal records, including fraud.

In September 2014, the Gwangju High Court overturned a lower court's ruling that sentenced another salt farm owner to a prison term, and instead sentenced him to a suspended prison sentence. This decision has faced criticism, as the Gwangju High Court justified the suspended sentence by stating that "the practice of exploiting salt farm slaves has been a local custom".

== Response ==
President Park Geun-hye commented about the exploitation of workers in Sinan County. She said, "It should never happen in the twenty-first century; we need to root this kind of human trafficking out, so the National Police Agency and the Supreme Prosecutors' Office must investigate other remote islands to prevent human trafficking".

The Seoul Guro Police Station (part of the Seoul Metropolitan Police Agency) suggested a close investigation on the trafficking in South Korean remote islands.

On 22 February 2014, Jeollanam-do decided to resolve the exploitation of workers in the islands by promoting the workers' rights of salt evaporation pond labours.

After the farmer and the agency were arrested, KBS interviewed citizens in Sinan county. One pond-owner's wife said, "We shouldn't give disabled people salaries because they would spend all salaries for buying alcoholic beverages". One citizen said, "In Sinan, an honest person becomes a fool. The fifth-richest man owns the fifth most pond workers". A conscript police officer stated, "During my service period in Sinan County, even a local police inspector had disregarded handicapped people's human rights".

Some South Korean internet sites such as Naver criticised both Sinan County and the local police. Based on Sinan County's geographical position, Ilbe Storehouse, a South Korean website, blamed the Honam region as a whole.

== Victims who did not receive compensation ==
40 of the 63 victims who rescued in 2014, were returned to the salt farms on their own or by the will of others. Although they managed to find freedom, most of them returned to the salt fields because they had been exploited for so long, had no family to welcome them, and had difficulty finding new jobs. They are still suffering from high-intensity work of more than 12 hours a day and no holidays, with wages below the minimum wage. The total amount of wages received by the victims was 15 million won for 20 years, an average of 130 won per hour. The Provincial Government of South Jeolla Province promised to provide support such as education to help victims find jobs to response for such incidents, but it was not implemented.

In November 2015, the victims filed a lawsuit against the state for damages, and said that "police at the police station essentially neglected the matter and helped the perpetrators by catching the escaped victims and returning them to the perpetrators." Regarding this, the central government, Sinan County, and Wando County claimed that the victims were responsible for the incident, saying, "If the victims do not actively report, it will be difficult to detect them." However, the victims did report or attempt to escape, and since the civilians and public officials in the area were all on the same side, they ignored the reports and caught and sent back the escapees, so the government, Sinan County, and Wando County's claims are being criticised.

== 2020-present ==
=== Before 2025 ===
In 2021, an incident occurred at a salt farm in Sinan County where the business owner exploited the wages of a worker with a disability. According to the South Jeolla Province Police on 1 November 2021, the largest salt farm operator in Sinan was under investigation for failing to properly pay wages to an employee who had worked at the salt farm for several years, and for the unauthorised use of the employee's credit card and other personal items. The victim had endured long-term labour exploitation, including constant surveillance of his every move, before finally escaping.

In 2022, an official from the Embassy of the United States in Seoul went to Mokpo, near Sinan County, and comprehensively investigated the connection between the 2021 and 2014 incidents, the status of the investigation, and the positions of relevant agencies, and submitted a report to the United States Department of State. Meanwhile, it was confirmed that salt farm workers who had denied the damage in 2021 changed their statements, saying, "I will never go back to the salt farms again". The previous investigation was conducted when the victims were not clearly separated from the salt farm owner, and because there was no belief that the victims would be protected, they lied to defend the salt farm owner. This suggests that there may be more exploitation damage that has not been revealed.

=== Sanction by the United States in 2025 ===
In April 2025, the U.S. Customs and Border Protection (CBP) issued a Withhold Release Order (WRO) to block the importation of solar salt products from the Taepyung Salt Farm, located in Sinan County. The CBP determined that the salt farms unmistakably met multiple indicators of forced labor as defined by the International Labour Organization (ILO), including abuse of vulnerability, deception, restriction of movement, confiscation of ID cards, abusive living and working conditions, intimidation and threats, physical violence, debt bondage, withholding of wages, and excessive overtime. As a result, all Taepyung Salt Farm products were seized at all U.S. ports of entry, effectively banning their importation.

=== South Korean Government and Sinan County's cover-up attempts ===
There is criticism about the South Korean government and Sinan County's cover-up attempts.

On 7 April 2025, after the US sanctions were announced in 2025, South Korea's Ministry of Oceans and Fisheries claimed that "all solar salt products produced at Taepyung Salt Farm currently exported to the US are not related to forced labour", and cited as examples the annual survey of the salt farm workforce and expanded support for automated equipment as evidence that remedial measures had already been implemented with relevant ministries following the forced labour incident in 2021. Sinan County also claimed that since the "Sinan County Human Rights Protection and Promotion Ordinance" enacted in December 2021 after past incidents, there have been no cases of human rights violations or unsatisfactory cases such as wage arrears to date.

However, there are criticisms in the claims of the South Korean government and Sinan County because the South Korean government is not properly holding companies and employers accountable for forced labour on salt farms. Moreover, the South Korean government and Sinan County not only have no intention of checking whether there are other salt farm slaves, they are also trying to cover it up. Rather, they are insisting that we must unconditionally believe the unverifiable claims of those related to the Shinan salt farm slaves, who have become a huge cartel consisting of local police officers, civil servants, islanders, and local politicians who live off their votes while protecting the Taepyung Salt Farm. Despite that, the South Korean government only takes the side of Taepyung Salt Farm and Sinan County and claims that forced labour and slavery no longer exist. Without reflecting on or apologising for their wrongdoings on the grounds of "no punishment", they only express their grievances and dissatisfaction, making excuses such as "There are no salt farm slaves. Please stop using such horrible words", and "Some people are exaggerating, the media is exaggerating, and the public is misunderstanding".
