= Human trafficking in South Korea =

Human trafficking in South Korea refers to the illegal trade of humans for the purposes of forced labor, debt bondage, and slavery-like practices within the Republic of Korea. While South Korea is a highly developed democracy with the tenth-largest economy in the world, it continues to face persistent challenges regarding the exploitation of vulnerable populations. The primary victims of labor trafficking are foreign migrant workers from Southeast and Central Asia, as well as South Korean nationals with intellectual disabilities or those experiencing homelessness.

The South Korean government has ratified the Protocol to Prevent, Suppress and Punish Trafficking in Persons, commonly known as the Palermo Protocol. In the 2025 Trafficking in Persons Report (covering data from 2024), the United States Department of State designated South Korea as a Tier 1 country, indicating that the government fully meets the minimum standards for the elimination of trafficking. However, this designation remains controversial among human rights organizations and labor unions, who argue that state-sponsored labor migration programs—specifically the Employment Permit System (EPS) and the Seasonal Worker Program (SWP)—contain structural flaws that facilitate forced labor. Furthermore, the recurring discovery of enslaved disabled persons in remote rural areas has drawn international condemnation regarding the country's protection of its most vulnerable citizens.

== History of labor and migration ==
The history of human trafficking in South Korea is closely tied to the country's rapid economic transformation. Following the Korean War, South Korea was primarily a labor-exporting country. However, as the nation industrialized in the 1980s and 1990s, the domestic workforce became increasingly educated and wealthy, leading to a widespread avoidance of so-called "3D" jobs—those that are dirty, difficult, and dangerous. This labor vacuum in the manufacturing, construction, and agricultural sectors created a structural reliance on foreign labor.

In a landmark ruling on September 29, 2022, the Supreme Court of Korea officially recognized the state's historical role in facilitating sex trafficking. The court ordered the government to compensate 95 women who had worked in "camptowns" surrounding U.S. military bases between the 1950s and 1970s. The court found that the government had "justified and encouraged" prostitution to boost military alliances and earn foreign currency, subjecting the women to systematic violence and mandatory STD testing.

== Shinan salt farm slavery ==
The "Shinan salt farm slavery" incidents refer to a series of high-profile discovery cases involving the enslavement of people with intellectual disabilities on the remote islands of Sinan County, Jeollanam-do. Sinan County comprises over 1,000 islands, many of which are dedicated to the production of sea salt. The labor-intensive nature of salt harvesting, combined with the extreme geographic isolation and an aging local population, created an environment where illegal exploitation could thrive unchecked by mainland authorities.

=== Modus operandi and recruitment ===
The trafficking networks operating the salt farm slavery rings typically utilized unlicensed employment brokers based in major urban centers like Seoul and Suwon. These brokers targeted the most marginalized members of society, specifically the homeless and individuals with cognitive impairments who frequented free meal centers or slept in train stations. Brokers would approach these individuals with false promises of high-paying jobs, comfortable accommodation, and three meals a day. Once the victims agreed, they were transported hundreds of kilometers to the southwestern coast and put on ferries to remote islands. Upon arrival, the brokers would "sell" the workers to salt farm owners for a fee ranging from hundreds to thousands of dollars. The farm owners would subsequently claim this fee was a debt the worker had incurred and was required to pay off through labor, establishing a classic condition of debt bondage.

=== The 2014 rescue case ===
The issue exploded into national consciousness in February 2014 following the dramatic rescue of two victims from an island in Sinan. The victims were a visually impaired man named Kim and a man with intellectual disabilities named Chae. Kim had been lured from a construction site in Seoul, while Chae had been deceived by a broker at Suwon Station. For years, both men were forced to work up to 14 hours a day engaged in heavy manual labor. They lived in squalid storage containers converted into makeshift rooms, were provided with minimal food, and were subjected to constant surveillance.

The victims faced severe physical and psychological abuse. When they worked too slowly or attempted to rest, they were beaten with iron pipes and wooden clubs. The farm owner threatened to kill them if they attempted to escape. The isolation of the island meant that the only way off was by ferry, and the local ferry operators often colluded with farm owners to prevent workers from boarding without permission.

The pivotal moment came when Kim managed to purchase a postcard and secretly write a plea for help to his mother in Seoul. He waited until the farm owner was distracted and dropped the letter into a mailbox. His mother received the letter and immediately contacted the Guro Police Station in Seoul. Notably, the Seoul police decided not to coordinate with the local police in Sinan County, suspecting that local law enforcement officers were colluding with the salt farm owners. Instead, the Seoul police disguised themselves as tourists, infiltrated the island, and successfully rescued the men.

=== Police collusion and systemic failure ===
The 2014 investigation revealed deep-seated systemic failures and corruption within the local governance of the islands. It was discovered that Kim had attempted to escape previously and had managed to reach a local police substation (Police Box). However, instead of protecting him, the local officers called the salt farm owner to come and retrieve him, effectively returning a victim of trafficking to his abuser. This incident confirmed long-held suspicions by human rights groups that the tight-knit island communities prioritized protecting their local economy and neighbors over the rights of outsiders.

Following the rescue, a special investigation team combed the area and identified 63 additional victims of slavery on nearby farms. The majority of these victims were determined to be mentally disabled or had been missing persons for years. The scandal forced the resignation of local officials and a public apology from the Sinan County governor.

=== Judicial leniency ===
Despite the horrifying nature of the crimes, the judicial response in the aftermath of the 2014 crackdown was widely criticized for its leniency. South Korean courts frequently issued suspended sentences or reduced prison terms for the convicted farm owners. Judges often cited "local customary practices" in the salt industry and the fact that the owners had no prior criminal records as mitigating factors. Additionally, the courts placed significant weight on whether the perpetrator had reached a financial settlement with the victim's family. In many cases, owners coerced victims—who often lacked the capacity to fully understand the legal proceedings—into signing "agreements of non-punishment" (Hap-ui) in exchange for relatively small sums of money. This legal loophole allowed many traffickers to avoid prison time.

In 2018, the Seoul High Court ruled that the South Korean government was liable for the police's failure to protect the victims, ordering the state to pay compensation of 30 million won (approximately $26,500) to each of the plaintiffs.

== Migrant labor exploitation ==
While the salt farm cases represent a form of internal trafficking, the largest volume of forced labor in South Korea occurs within the state-sponsored migrant labor programs.

=== Employment Permit System (EPS) ===
The Employment Permit System (E-9 visa) is the primary vehicle for low-skilled labor migration into South Korea, bringing in tens of thousands of workers annually from countries such as Vietnam, Cambodia, Nepal, and the Philippines. The central criticism of the EPS is that it ties the worker's visa directly to a specific employer. Under Article 25 of the Act on the Employment of Foreign Workers, a worker may only change workplaces if they obtain a "release form" signed by their current employer, or if they can prove in a government labor office that the employer violated the law.

Proving these violations is notoriously difficult for migrant workers due to language barriers and a lack of evidence. Consequently, employers wield immense power. They can force workers to perform tasks outside their contract, work excessive overtime without pay, or endure dangerous conditions. If a worker leaves the workplace without the employer's permission, they are classified as a "runaway" and become an undocumented illegal immigrant.

=== Seasonal Worker Program (SWP) ===
In response to aging rural populations and acute labor shortages, the government expanded the Seasonal Worker Program (E-8 visa) in the 2020s. This program allows local municipal governments (counties and cities) to sign Memorandums of Understanding (MOU) directly with foreign local governments to bring in workers for short periods, typically five to eight months.

The SWP has been described by experts as a "blind spot" for human trafficking because it lacks the federal oversight mechanisms of the EPS. In 2024, a major scandal emerged in Yanggu County, Gangwon Province. A group of brokers facilitated the entry of Filipino workers and intercepted their bankbooks and wages, taking a commission that amounted to nearly half of the workers' total earnings. The brokers also confiscated passports to prevent flight. The National Human Rights Commission of Korea investigated the case and determined that the local government had been negligent in its oversight, effectively creating a system of modern slavery.

=== Fishing industry ===
The fishing industry, particularly on vessels weighing 20 tons or more, is a sector with a high prevalence of forced labor. Migrant fishermen, often from Indonesia and Vietnam, work under grueling conditions that can involve 18 to 20 hour shifts for months at a time without returning to port. The physical isolation of deep-sea vessels makes escape impossible. A common practice in this industry is the confiscation of passports and the retention of a portion of the worker's monthly wage as a "security deposit," which is only returned upon the completion of the contract.

== Legal framework and government response ==
In January 2023, the Act on Prevention of Human Trafficking and Protection of Victims came into force. This was a legislative milestone for South Korea, as it provided the first comprehensive domestic definition of human trafficking that aligns with international standards. The Act defines trafficking broadly to include the recruitment, transportation, transfer, harboring, or receipt of persons by means of threat, force, abduction, fraud, or abuse of power for the purpose of exploitation.

To support the implementation of the law, the government introduced a "Victim Identification Index" in 2023. This checklist is designed to help police officers, labor inspectors, and immigration officials identify potential trafficking victims during investigations. The indicators include signs of psychological control, lack of possession of identity documents, and evidence of debt bondage. However, implementation remains a challenge. Statistics from the 2025 State Department report indicated that while over 1,400 individuals were screened using the index in 2024, only 55 were officially identified as victims. Critics argue that this low number indicates that frontline officers still view undocumented migrants primarily as immigration offenders rather than victims of crime.

== See also ==
- Slavery on salt farms in Sinan County
