= Foreigners' Street =

Amusement park in Chongqing, China

Coordinates: 29°36′14″N 106°36′04″E

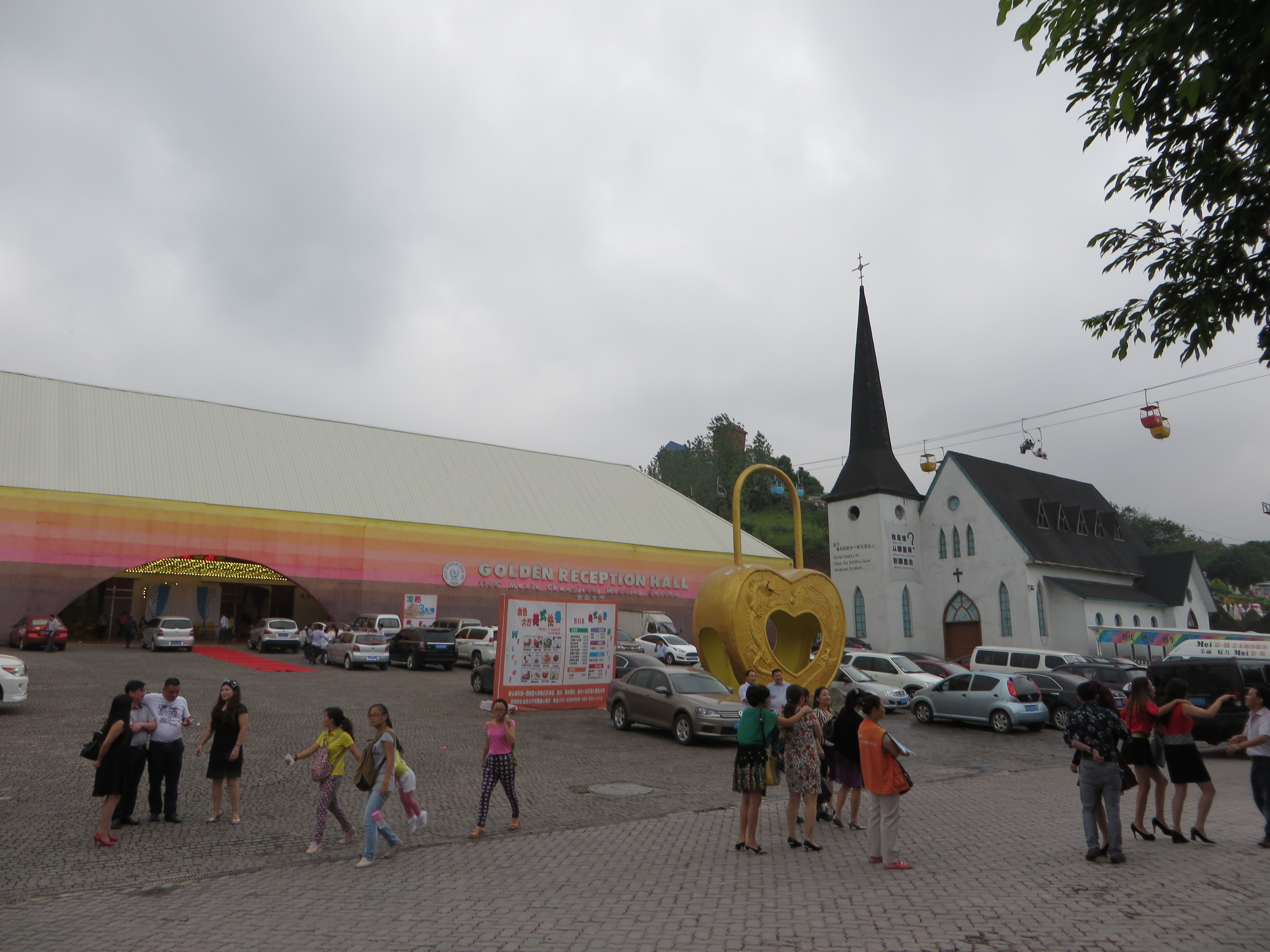
Wedding reception building and church at Foreigners' Street.

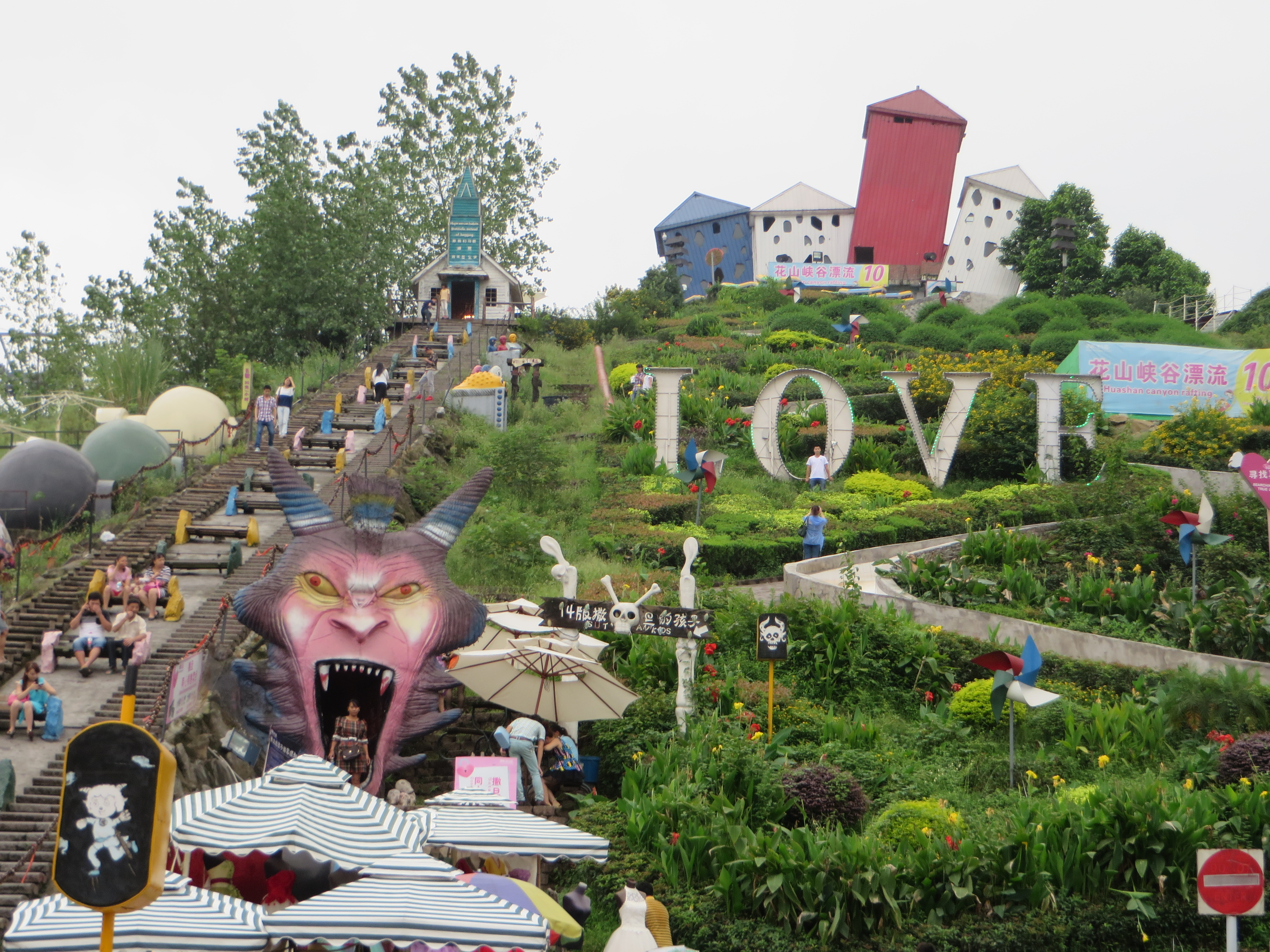
Hillside at Foreigners' Street.

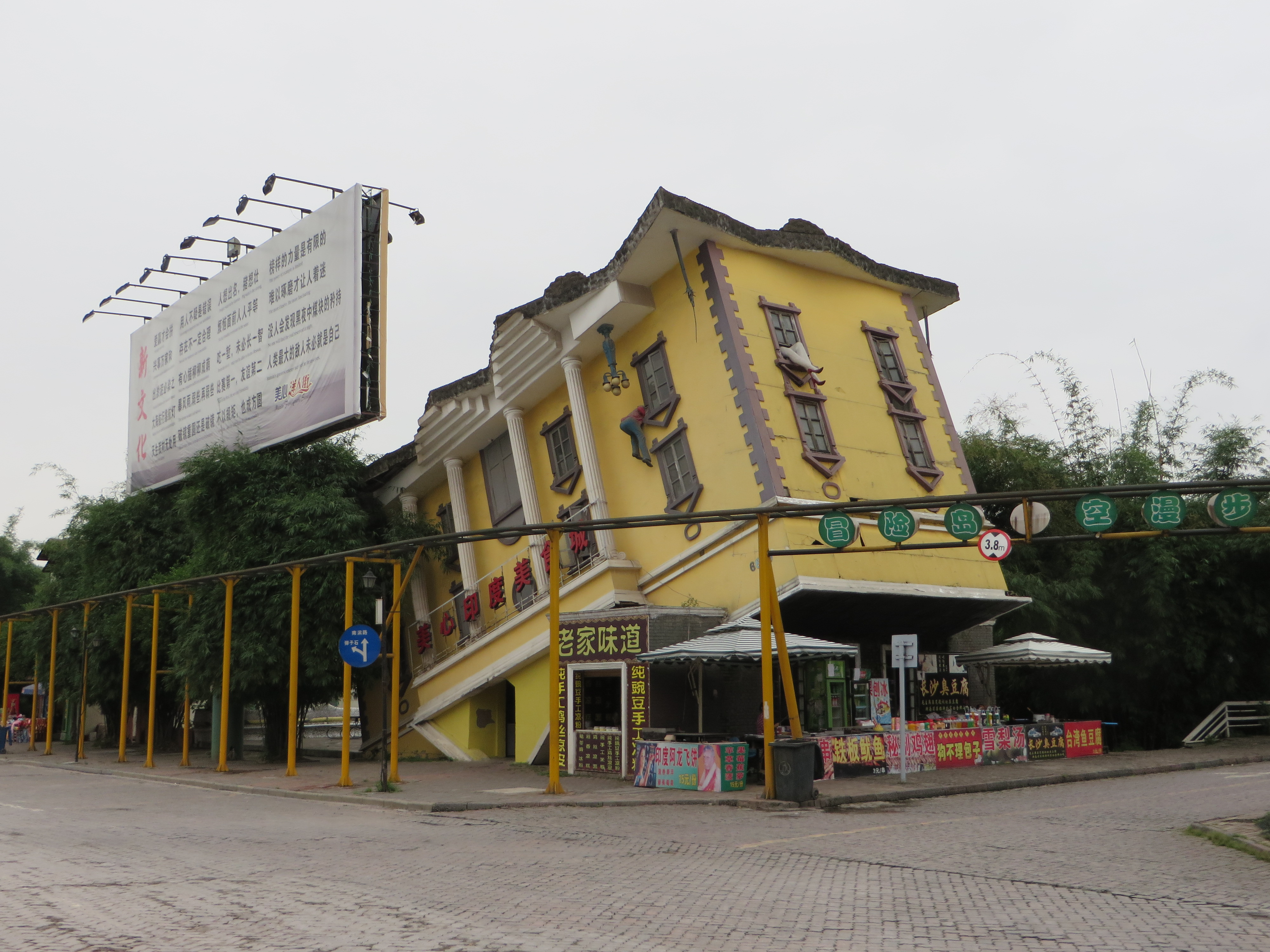
Upside-down house at Foreigners' Street.

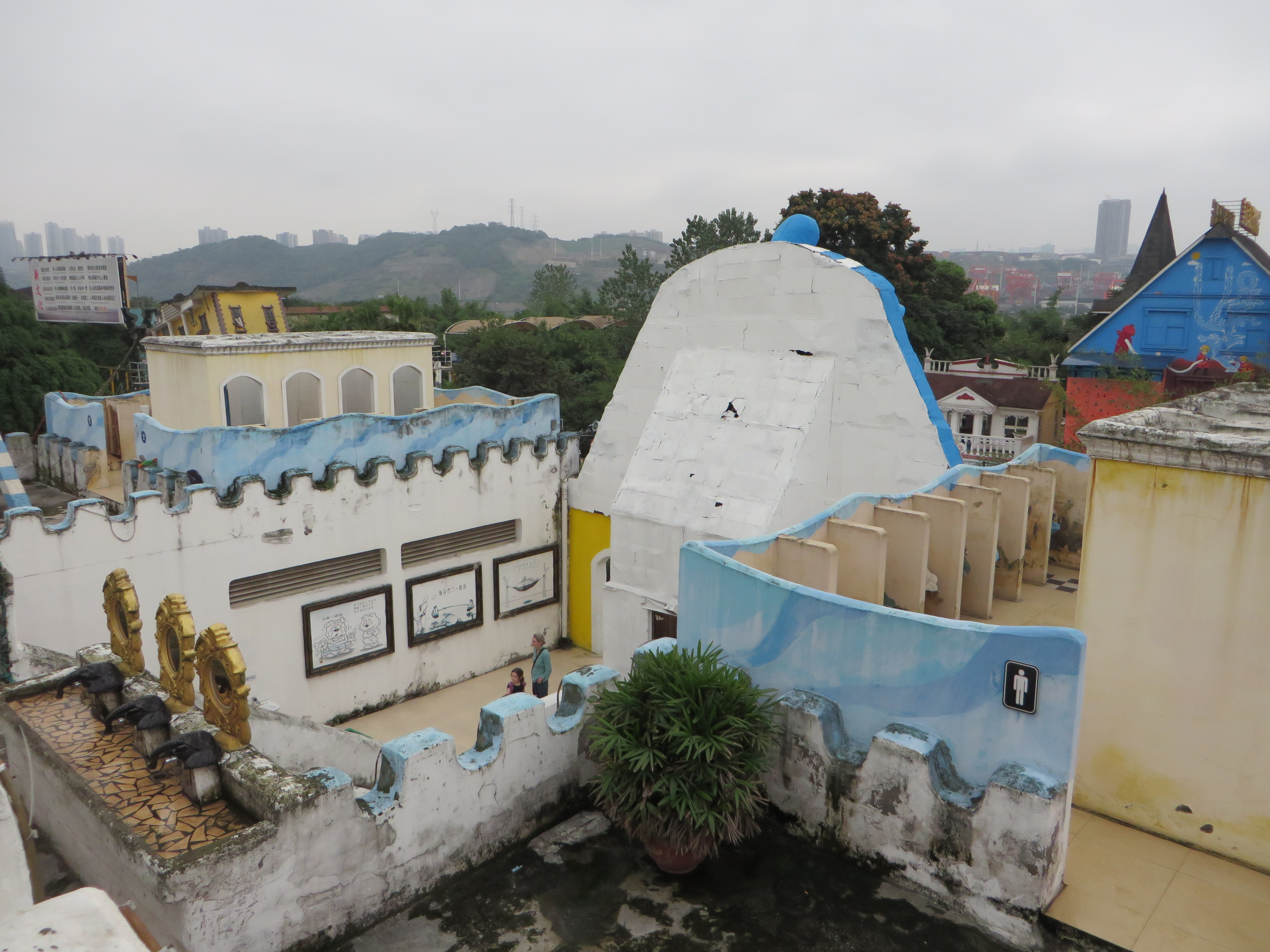
View of the Porcelain Palace at Foreigners' Street.

Foreigners' Street or Yangren Jie (sometimes just Foreigner Street; Chinese: 美心洋人街) was an amusement park and entertainment area in Chongqing, China. It combined various styles of architecture, food, and attractions from around the world. It was northwest of Jiefangbei on the other side of the Yangtze River. As part of an urban development plan and upon expiration of land lease, the Yangren Jie was ordered to close and vacate starting on March 1, 2019. It was planned to be relocated to Fuling district, Chongqing.

The theme park was established in 2006 and covers 3.5 km^{2}. Initially the site was seen as a European-style pedestrian street. The park includes recreations of well-known landmarks such as a 10-meter Christ the Redeemer statue from Rio de Janeiro in Brazil and a 150-meter section of the Great Wall of China. The site is open 24 hours a day, with free entry, and has been described as "overly kitschy".

Foreigners have been encouraged to set up shops, hence the name. Buildings include a church, an upside-down house, and the world's largest public toilet (the "Porcelain Palace"). Foreigners' Street is located near Danzishi in the Nan'an District of Chongqing. The attraction was initiated by the manager of Meixin Group. It covers an area of over two square kilometers.

The Love Land sex theme park attraction would have been near Foreigners' Street. This was due to be opened in 2009, but was demolished by the Chinese authorities before it actually opened. The Porcelain Palace was itself purged of artworks and facilities seen as vulgar by the authorities. Signs for Love Land in Foreigners' Street were removed by the authorities.

Laowai Street in Shanghai literally means "Foreigner's Street".

== See also ==
- Love Land (China)
- Porcelain Palace
