= Cabrera (surname) =

Cabrera is a Spanish surname. It is the feminine form of "cabrero", meaning goatherd. Notable people with the surname include:

== A ==
- Al Cabrera (18811964), Spanish baseball player
- Alex Cabrera (born 1971), Venezuelan baseball player
- Ana Cabrera (born 1982), American journalist and television news anchor
- Analí Cabrera (1959–2011), Peruvian actress, vedette, and athlete
- Ángel Cabrera (naturalist) (1879–1960), Spanish zoologist
- Ángel Cabrera (born 1969), Argentinian professional golfer
- Asdrúbal Cabrera (born 1985), Venezuelan baseball player in Major League Baseball
- Alberto Pedro Cabrera (1933–2026), also known as Beto Cabrera, Argentine comedian and actor.
- Alberto Pedro Cabrera (1945–2000), also known as Beto Cabrera, Argentine basketball player

== B ==
- Benedicto Cabrera aka Ben Cabrera or BenCab (born 1952), Filipino painter
- Bernardo de Cabrera (1289–1364), Aragonese military man and diplomat
- Blas Cabrera Navarro (born 1946), American physicist
- Blas Cabrera Felipe (1878–1945), Spanish physicist
- Boris Cabrera (born 1980), Spanish-American actor and personal trainer

== C ==
- Candice "Black" Cabrera, reality show contestant and model
- Carlos Humberto Cabrera (born 1973), Colombian road cyclist
- César Benito Cabrera, US ambassador to Mauritius and Seychelles
- Conrado Cabrera (born 1967), Cuban track cyclist

== D ==
- Daniel Cabrera (born 1981), Dominican baseball pitcher
- Delfo Cabrera (1919–1981), Argentinian athlete, 1948 Olympic medalist
- Diana Cabrera (born 1984), Canadian-Uruguayan sport shooter
- Dolores Cabrera y Heredia (1828–1899), Spanish writer

== E ==
- Edward Cabrera (born 1998), Dominican baseball player
- Everth Cabrera (born 1986), Nicaraguan baseball player

== F ==
- Fernando Cabrera (baseball) (born 1981), Puerto Rican baseball pitcher
- Francisco Cabrera (baseball), Dominican Major League Baseball player
- Francisco Cabrera (cyclist), Chilean track and road cyclist

== G ==
- Geles Cabrera (1929–2026), Mexican sculptor
- Génesis Cabrera (born 1996), Dominican baseball player
- Guillermo Cabrera Infante, Cuban author

== J ==
- James Ernesto Morales Cabrera (born 1969), changed his name to Jimmy Morales, President of Guatemala
- Joaquina Cabrera (1836–1908), de facto First Lady of Guatemala and mother of Guatemalan President Manuel Estrada Cabrera
- Jolbert Cabrera (born 1972), Colombian baseball player
- Jorge Cabrera, American politician
- José Cabrera (baseball), Dominican baseball player
- José Antonio Cabrera (1768–1820), Argentine statesman
- José Ramón Balaguer Cabrera (1932–2022), Cuban politician
- Juan Bautista Cabrera (1837–1916), Spanish bishop of the Reformed Church

== L ==
- Leandro Cabrera (born 1991), Uruguayan footballer
- Lina Cabrera (born 1954), Filipino politician
- Lisandro Cabrera (born 1998), Argentine footballer
- Luis Cabrera Herrera (born 1955), Catholic bishop of Guayaquil, Ecuador
- Luis Cabrera Lobato (1876–1954), Mexican lawyer, politician and writer
- Lydia Cabrera (1899–1991), Cuban anthropologist and poet

== M ==
- Manuel Estrada Cabrera (1857–1923), President of Guatemala from 1898 to 1920
- María Luisa Cabrera (1904–1989), Mexican artist
- Matías Cabrera (born 1986), Uruguayan football player
- Melky Cabrera (born 1984), Dominican baseball player in Major League Baseball
- Miguel Cabrera (painter) (1695–1768), Mexican painter
- Miguel Cabrera (born 1983), Venezuelan baseball player in Major League Baseball
- Miguel Cabrera Cabrera (born 1948), Spanish architect and politician
- Mónica Cabrera (born 1958), Argentine actress, director, and playwright

== N ==
- Nelson Cabrera (disambiguation)
- Nicolás Cabrera (1913–1989), Spanish physicist

== O ==
- Orlando Cabrera (born 1974), Colombian baseball player
- Oswaldo Cabrera (born 1999), Venezuelan baseball player

== P ==
- Pablo Cabrera, (born 1997), American baseball coach
- Pedro Cabrera (born 1927), Spanish fencer
- Pedro García Cabrera (1905–1981), Spanish writer

== R ==
- Ramón Cabrera y Griñó (1806–1877), Spanish Carlist military officer
- Ramón Cabrera (baseball) (born 1989), Venezuelan baseball player
- Rosario Cabrera (1901–1975), Mexican painter
- Ryan Cabrera (born 1982), American pop-rock musician

== S ==
- Sandra Cabrera (1970–2004), Argentinian trade unionist
- Santiago Cabrera, (born 1978), Chilean actor

== V ==
- Vicente Cabrera Funes (1944–2014), Ecuadorian writer and professor
- Víctor Cabrera (disambiguation), several people

== See also ==
- Cabrera (disambiguation)
- Cabrero (disambiguation)
