= Prostitution in Argentina =

Prostitution in Argentina (exchanging sex for money) is legal under Federal law. Article 19 of the constitution states: "The private actions of people that do not offend in any way the public order and morality, nor damage a third person, are only reserved to God, and are exempt from the authority of the magistrates." Organised prostitution (brothels, prostitution rings and pimping) is illegal. In addition, individual provinces may place further restriction on the trade. For example, in San Juan, publicly offering sex services for money is punishable by up to 20 days in prison. In 2012, newspapers were banned from carrying classified-ads offering sexual services. UNAIDS estimated there to be about 75,000 prostitutes in the country in 2016.

Sex workers and the 2016 Human Rights Report of the US Department of State, report corruption, abuse and violence towards sex workers by the police. AMMAR report that between July 1996 and November 2001, 41 of their members have been murdered. Only 3 of these have been solved.

Traffickers from across Argentina bypass regulations that ban brothels by establishing “mobile brothels” in vans and trucks, making raids more difficult; this practice is particularly prevalent in the northern area of the country.

== History ==
From independence in 1853, Argentina attracted immigrants from Europe which included prostitutes. Prostitution was not a criminal offence, and in 1875 it was legalised and regulated in Buenos Aires. Brothels were established, prostitutes were registered and taxed, and were given regular medical examinations. In 1889, the first year statistics are available for, the number of new registrations of prostitutes in Buenos Aires was 2007, and a hospital, the Dispensario de salubridad, specialising in venereal disease amongst prostitutes was opened at a cost of 100,000 pesos.

Between 1870 and World War I the country developed a reputation as "the port of missing women" as a result of Jewish white slavers and pimps who took advantage of poverty, unemployment and pogroms in Eastern Europe to recruit young Jewish women into prostitution in South America with false promises of marriage. One of the criminal organisations involved, the Zwi Migdal, had 30,000 women in 2,000 brothels. At the same time, Jewish religious organisations in Argentina worked to prevent prostitution among Jewish women in the country. Most of the prostitutes in Argentina in this period were non-immigrant Catholics, but antisemitism fuelled concerns about Jewish involvement in prostitution. In 2013, filmmaker Gabriela Böhm released a documentary film In Raquel’s Footsteps investigating Jewish participation in the sex industry in Argentina in the early 20th century.

The system of regulated prostitution in Buenos Aires was abolished in 1934. In 1954, Juan Perón reintroduced the regularity system. Local authorities could license brothels in "suitable places*. The following year Buenos Aires announced a $6,516,000 scheme to build a street of 34 brothels. After the military coup on 16 September 1955, Peron was deposed and his regulation decree rescinded. The new red-light district in Buenos Aires was never built. In 2003, the Telefe channel made a television comedy series called Disputas expressing the horror and filth of the common Argentine prostitute, it starred the actresses Mirta Busnelli, Belén Blanco, Dolores Fonzi, Julieta Ortega and Florencia Peña.

== AMMAR ==
The Association of Women Sex Workers in Argentina in Action for Our Rights (AMMAR) is a major organization fighting for sex workers' rights. It was formed in 1994 by 60 sex workers, and grew to 15,000 members over the next 10 years. In 1995 it joined the Argentine Workers' Central Union (Central de Trabajadores Argentinos), and in 1997 was affiliated into the Network of Sex Workers of Latin America and the Caribbean (RedTraSex).

In January 2004, the head of the Rosario branch, Sandra Cabrera was murdered. Federal policeman Diego Parvlucyk was charged with her murder, although the case never went to trial. As part of the backlash after her murder, Santa Fe's notoriously corrupt Public Morality Police were disbanded.

== Sex Trafficking ==
The 2016 Trafficking in Persons Report of the US Department of State ranked Argentina is a Tier 2 country, however as a result of key achievements by the government, it was upgraded to Tier 1 in 2018.

Human traffickers exploit domestic and foreign victims in Argentina, and to a more limited extent, Argentine women and children are victims of sex trafficking in other countries. Traffickers exploit victims from other Latin American countries in Argentina, particularly the Dominican Republic, Paraguay, Peru, Bolivia, Uruguay, Venezuela, and Brazil. Transgender Argentines are exploited in sex trafficking within the country and in Western Europe. Traffickers exploit minors participating in domestic youth sports clubs in sex trafficking. Official complicity, mainly at the sub-national levels, continues to hinder the government's efforts to combat trafficking. In 2016, the Municipality of Ushuaia was ordered to pay restitution to a victim after being found complicit of facilitating trafficking by failing to adequately regulate brothels.

== Child Prostitution ==
According to ECPAT International, in 1999 child prostitution was increasing and the average age of prostituted children was decreasing. Many child prostitutes in Argentina are trafficked to urban centres from rural areas or are trafficked from neighboring countries such as Bolivia, Brazil, Paraguay, Chile, and Uruguay, and other countries such as Colombia, Dominican Republic, Russia, Venezuela, Romania and Haiti. Revelations in 2018 of an active prostitution ring in Argentina's soccer minor league that victimized youth athletes raised concerns about child sex trafficking in domestic sports and athletic clubs.

== See also ==
- Sandra Cabrera
- Zwi Migdal
