= Cabrero =

Cabrero or Cabreros may refer to:

- Cabrero, Chile, a commune in the Bío Bío Province, Bío Bío Region, Chile
- Cabrero, Cáceres, a municipality of Cáceres province, autonomous community of Extremadura, Spain
- Cabreros del Monte, a municipality of Valladolid province, Castile and León, Spain
- Cabreros del Río, a municipality located of León province, Castile and León, Spain

== People with the surname ==
- Andrés Cabrero (born 1989), Puerto Rican footballer
- David Cabrero (1976–2026), Spanish cyclist
- Enrique Cabrero (born 1956), Mexican scientist and administrator
- Jesús Cabrero (born 1981), Spanish footballer
- José Daniel Barquero Cabrero (born 1966), Spanish businessman and teacher
- Juan Ramón Cabrero (born 1980), Spanish footballer
- Ramón Cabrero (1947–2017), Spanish-Argentine footballer

== Animals ==
- Western spindalis, Caribbean bird

== See also ==
- Cabrera (disambiguation)
