= Cabral =

Cabral may refer to:

== Places ==
- Amílcar Cabral International Airport, international airport of Cape Verde
- Cabral, Dominican Republic, a town in the Dominican Republic
- Cabrales, municipality in Spain
- Fundação Dom Cabral, Brazilian business school
- Robert J. Cabral Station, United States train station
- Sargento Cabral Department, in Chaco Province in Argentina
- Vila Olímpica Elzir Cabral, multi-use stadium in Brazil

== People ==
- Cabral (surname)
- Cabral (footballer) (born 1988), Cape Verdean footballer
- Amílcar Cabral, a Marxist revolutionary
- Cathy Cabral, former Filipino undersecretary of the Department of Public Works and Highways from 2014 to 2025
- Pedro Álvares Cabral, Portuguese explorer, the European discoverer of Brazil
- Luís Cabral, first President of Guinea-Bissau
- Cabral Ibacka, Romanian-Congolese TV personality

== Other ==
- African Youth Amílcar Cabral, youth wing of PAIGC political party in Guinea-Bissau
- Amílcar Cabral Cup, football tournament for Western African nations
- Cabral (horse), a Paralympics dressage horse
- Cabrales cheese, Spanish cheese
- Fenyramidol, trade name Cabral, a muscle relaxant

== See also ==
- Cabreira, a comarca (shire) in the province of León, Spain
- Cabrera (disambiguation)
- Cabrero (disambiguation)
