= Human trafficking in Paraguay =

In 2009, Paraguay was a source and transit country for women and children subjected to trafficking in persons, specifically sex trafficking, as well as a source and transit country for men, women, and children in forced labor. Most Paraguayan trafficking victims were found in Argentina, Spain, and Bolivia; fewer victims were exploited in Brazil, Chile, France, South Korea, and Japan. In one case, 44 suspected Paraguayan trafficking victims were detained at the international airport in Amsterdam, and Dutch authorities arrested the alleged trafficking offender. In another case, 13 Paraguayan women were found in conditions of forced prostitution in a brothel in La Paz, Bolivia. Paraguay was a destination country for 30 Indonesian orphans, who were allegedly brought into the country for a long-term soccer camp, but who the government suspects are trafficking victims.

The involuntary domestic servitude of men, women and children within Paraguay remained a serious problem in 2009. Indigenous persons were particularly at risk of being subjected to forced labor or forced prostitution, both in Paraguay and abroad. Poor children from rural areas were subjected to forced commercial sexual exploitation and domestic servitude in urban centers such as Asunción, Ciudad del Este, and Encarnación, and a significant number of street children are trafficking victims. Many undocumented migrants, some of whom could be trafficked, traveled through the Tri-Border Area of Paraguay, Argentina, and Brazil.

In 2009 the Government of Paraguay did not fully comply with the minimum standards for eliminating trafficking; however, it was making significant efforts to do so. The government increased law enforcement efforts against sex trafficking offenders, but lagged in providing adequate services to trafficking victims. Revisions in the penal code strengthened the government's ability to prosecute international cases of trafficking, but failed to adequately prohibit internal cases of forced labor or forced prostitution. Paraguayan authorities have made no discernible progress in confronting acts of official complicity.

The country ratified the 2000 UN TIP Protocol in September 2004.

The U.S. State Department's Office to Monitor and Combat Trafficking in Persons placed the country in "Tier 2" in 2017 and 2023.

In 2023, the Organised Crime Index gave Paraguay a score of 7.5 out of 10 for human trafficking.

According to official data released in 2025, an analysis of investigated human trafficking cases in Paraguay indicated that 76 percent of victims were female and 50 percent were under the age of 18.

== Prosecution ==
Article 129 of the 1997 penal code prohibits the transnational movement of persons for the purpose of prostitution, prescribing penalties of six years’ imprisonment. Articles 129(b) and (c) of a new penal code, which came into force in July 2009, prohibit transnational trafficking for the purposes of prostitution and forced labor through means of force, threats, deception, or trickery, prescribing penalties up to 12 years’ imprisonment. The United States Department of State's Trafficking in Persons Report 2010 judged all of these prescribed penalties are sufficiently stringent and commensurate with penalties prescribed for other serious crimes, such as rape. Although Paraguayan law does not specifically prohibit internal trafficking, prosecutors can draw on the exploitation of prostitution and kidnapping statutes, as well as other penal code provisions, to prosecute cases of trafficking for commercial sexual exploitation or forced labor that occur entirely within Paraguay. During the Trafficking in Persons Report 2010's reporting period, Paraguayan authorities opened investigations into at least 138 possible trafficking cases, compared with 43 cases in 2008. Authorities indicted 47 trafficking offenders and secured the convictions of two trafficking offenders, who both received sentences of two years. These efforts represented a decrease in the number of convictions and the length of sentences from the previous year, when four trafficking offenders were each sentenced to six years in prison.

According to the 2023 Trafficking in Persons Report by the United States Department of State, "the Comprehensive Anti-Trafficking Law 4788 of 2012 criminalized sex trafficking and labor trafficking and prescribed penalties of up to eight years' imprisonment for cases involving adult victims and two to 20 years' imprisonment for those involving child victims" but "the use of force, fraud, and coercion" in such crimes is "inconsistent with international law."

In addition to the trafficking in persons division in Asuncion and an existing unit in Puerto Elisa, the police established anti-trafficking units in Coronel Oviedo, Encarnación, Caaguazú, and Ciudad del Este in 2009. The government dedicated a total of 33 employees to anti-trafficking law enforcement efforts. During the past year, however, some government officials, including police, border guards, judges, and elected officials, reportedly facilitated trafficking crimes by accepting payments from trafficking offenders. Other officials reportedly undermined investigations, alerted suspected trafficking offenders of impending arrests, or released trafficking offenders from incarceration. Paraguayan authorities took no discernible steps to investigate or prosecute these acts of trafficking-related complicity. The government continued to work closely with foreign governments in their law enforcement efforts: Paraguayan authorities extradited one trafficking offender to Argentina, and a government prosecutor worked closely with Bolivian government counterparts in the case of 13 Paraguayans subjected to forced prostitution in La Paz.

== Protection (2009) ==
The government maintained efforts to protect victims of trafficking, but victims’ assistance remained inadequate. Authorities did not employ a formal system for proactively identifying trafficking victims among vulnerable populations such as women in prostitution, domestic servants, or street children. They did, however, identify several trafficking victims and arrested 24 suspected trafficking offenders during 26 raids on brothels in 2009. The government ran one women's shelter and supported other assistance programs to provide some short-term services, such as medical, psychological, and legal assistance, including three drop-in centers - these services can collectively accommodate 100 victims at a time. The government could not, however, meet the demands for services, and most victim assistance is funded at least in part by NGO's and international donors. The Paraguayan government did not have shelter facilities for male victims. The government provided limited assistance to foreign trafficking victims as well as limited legal, medical, psychological, and shelter assistance to Paraguayans trafficked abroad and later repatriated to the country. During the reporting period, authorities identified 138 trafficking victims, and provided assistance to 78 victims, 30 of which were children, compared with 51 victims assisted in the previous year. Paraguayan authorities encouraged victims to participate in the investigation and prosecution of their traffickers, and some victims filed complaints to open investigations. Victims generally avoided the court system, however, due to social stigma, fear of retaliation, and lack of confidence in the judicial system. Victims generally were not jailed, deported, or otherwise penalized for acts committed as a direct result of being trafficked. Paraguay offered temporary or permanent residency status for foreign trafficking victims on a case-by-case basis.

== Prevention (2009) ==
The Paraguayan government sustained prevention activities last year, and focused its efforts on training officials. The government maintained partnerships with NGOs and international organizations on anti-trafficking efforts, and worked with one international partner on a campaign advertising the contact numbers for hotlines used by anti-trafficking police units. The government also forged partnerships with the governments of neighboring countries, and hosted two anti-trafficking seminars with Brazilian and Argentinean anti-trafficking experts; 300 individuals attended the seminar in Asuncion. The Women's Secretariat conducted 12 regional workshops highlighting the local government response to human trafficking, with a total of 1,000 participants. The government sponsored an anti-trafficking expert to train Paraguayan consular officers in Spain, Italy, and Argentina on how to handle human trafficking cases. The government reported no efforts to reduce demand for commercial sex acts or forced labor. Paraguay was not a well-known destination for child sex tourists, though foreign citizens from neighboring countries are reported to engage in commercial sexual exploitation of children in Ciudad del Este. The government provided human rights training, which included a human trafficking component, to troops deployed on international peacekeeping missions.

== See also ==
- Human rights in Paraguay
