= Torre Cabrera =

Torre Cabrera may refer to a pair of coastal towers in Sicily, Italy:

- Torre Cabrera (Marina di Ragusa)
- Torre Cabrera (Pozzallo)

== See also ==
- Cabrera (disambiguation)
