= David Cabrera =

David Cabrera may refer to:

- David Cabrera (Salvadoran footballer) (born 1945), Salvadoran football forward
- David Cabrera (Mexican footballer) (born 1989), Mexican football midfielder
- David Cabrera (Colombian footballer) (born 1995), Colombian football midfielder

== See also ==
- Cabrera (disambiguation)
