= Association of Women Sex Workers of Argentina =

Sex worker union in Argentina

Association of Women Sex Workers in Argentina
- Asociación de Mujeres Meretrices de Argentina
- Location: Argentina
- Affiliations: Argentine Workers' Central Union
- Website: www.ammar.org.ar

The Asociación de Mujeres Meretrices de Argentina (AMMAR) is the union of sex workers in Argentina. It is responsible for defending their rights and ensuring the interests of sex workers. It is affiliated with the Central de Trabajadores Argentinos (CTA). In 1997 it became part of the Network of Women Sex Workers from Latin America and the Caribbean (RedTraSex).

== History ==
=== White Slavery ===
A vast majority of the women coming to Buenos Aires from 1875-1936 were French and Jewish (primarily coming from Poland and Russia). Buenos Aires was viewed as a leading destination due to the rules and regulations around sex work. This was also a bi-product of the Argentinian Governments attempt to keep their country an average European descent white nation. As a result of the influx of foreign-born women, they were more often registered as prostitutes in the city than the women born in Argentina. Fearful that their own respectability was tarnished by Jewish participation in commercial sex, Jewish immigrants to Argentina who engaged in respectable professions banned the "impure" from their synagogues.

The phrase "white slavery" served as a differentiator between voluntary and involuntary prostitution between white women and women of color. The term was used to promote activism primarily towards white women. Further, there were no groups making a stand against white slavery. Incoming boats would not allow anti-slavery groups board and travel into Argentina. In 1875, political and public debates surrounding prostitution came prevalent in Buenos Aires. Nothing came from these debates as the number of prostitutes rose by 2,007 people over the next 15 years. When World War II came along, many enslaved women took the chance to escape from their brothels. They would then look to safely marry back into the Jewish community where they could then ultimately live a free life. In 1994, AMMAR was formed to address the violence and inequality that sex workers in Argentina were facing.

=== Beginning ===
AMMAR’s initial stages began in 1994 when a group of women involved in Argentina’s sex trade organized in Buenos Aires to demand basic human rights and fight police violence. The organization was officially founded and incorporated in March 1995 to the Central de los Trabajadores Argentinos. The Embassy of the Netherlands in the city of Buenos Aires contributed to the installation of the office that the union currently has within the building of the CTA. Despite the 1983 fall of the military Junta, sex workers were still being policed. Sex workers were subjected to bribes, assaults and being falsely detained for thirty days by the police. Due to the intensified police brutality in 1994, Elena Reynaga, now AMMAR secretary, and other women who worked at the corner in Constitution, Buenos Aires politically organized. The organization was officially founded and incorporated in March 1995 to the Central de los Trabajadores Argentinos.

In the international arena, starting in 1997 and on the basis of contacts with different organizations nearby, the Sexual Workers Network of Latin America and the Caribbean was created; In it, organizations and focal points of the different countries of the continent are articulated. Elena Reynaga, as representative of Ammar, chairs this network.

Ammar's action contributed to the repeal of police edicts and the decriminalization of street prostitution in the city of Buenos Aires for a brief period, until the reform of Article 71 of the Contraventional Code on March 4, 1999, which again sanctioned the offer of sex on public roads in certain cases.AMMAR’s goal was for sex work to be recognized as wage labor. They initially fought to not be rearrested within twenty-four hours after being released. In 1994, AMMAR demanded to ensure their safety and equality. Their demands included “stop abuse against sex workers, the repeal of the Código de Faltas and Codigos Contravencionales (provincial codes that enable abuse), for violence against sex workers to be taken seriously, and for access to health and other welfare benefits”. Specifically they fought for the "derogation of Article 81 of the Code of Contraventions (Codigo contravencional/Codigo de Convivencia Urbana)". This article means the demand or offer for sex work is met with sanctions and monetary fines.

=== The murder of Sandra Cabrera ===
On January 27, 2004, Sandra Cabrera, general secretary of AMMAR in Rosario, was murdered. Cabrera had filed complaints against some local police officers, accusing them of corruption and asking for money from local sex workers in exchange for letting them work. For this reason she received threats, both against her and her daughter. In November 2003 she was brutally beaten inside her home and threatened to stop reporting. She was shot in the head two months after. Her body was found near the bus terminal in Rosario.

=== Present ===
AMMAR now focuses on legal reform and changing their status to recognize sex work as wage labor. This would allow sex work to be recognized work giving them rights like a pension, healthcare and other benefits that other unions receive. AMMAR became a legal nonprofit in 2007, "Personeria Juridica". They represent and organize with thirty-thousand sex workers annually. They advocated for sex worker healthcare through partnerships with hospitals and the Sandra Cabrera Health Centre. AMMAR is actively is working on ways to reach out to sex workers by creating apps and websites to notify sex workers about police raids. In 2003, Elena Reynaga, Secretary General of Ammar, was in charge of closing the "II Meeting on HIV / AIDS in Latin America and the Caribbean," which was held in Cuba. Currently, the union has representation in more than half of the provinces of Argentina and its General Secretary is Georgina Orellano. In March 2015, the Contraventional and Misdemeanor Criminal Justice of the City of Buenos Aires, with the ruling of Court No. 8 by Dr. Natalia Molina, recognized sex work as an illegal activity, condemned the prosecution of sex workers and urged the government to regulate the activity.

In 2013, Ammar commissioned the advertising agency Ogilvy & Mather to produce a series of advertisements in the form of street art. The campaign was named "Corners". The advertisements were placed on street corners. One side wall showed sexualized woman, the other women with children. On the side with children were the words 86 percent of sex workers are mothers. We need a law to regulate our work.
