= Elena Reynaga =

Activist for sex workers rights in Latin America

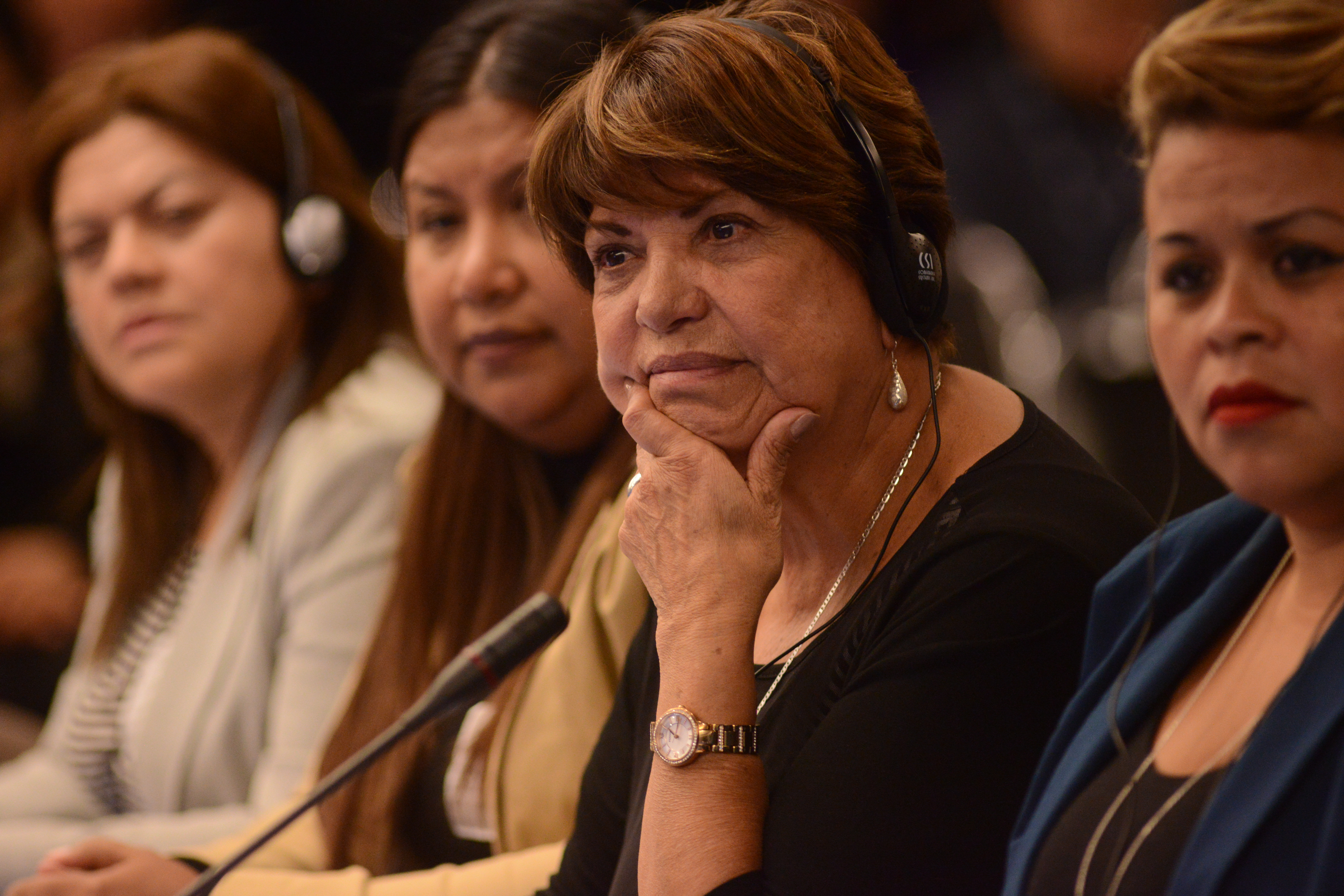
- Reynaga in 2017
- Born: Elena Eva Reynaga; July 28, 1953 (age 73); Jujuy, Argentina
- Known for: women human rights defender

Elena Eva Reynaga (born 1953 in Jujuy) is an Argentinian former sex worker and women human rights defender who campaigns for the rights of sex workers. Reynaga, is a founding member of Association of Women Sex Workers in Argentina (Spanish: Asociación de Mujeres Meretrices de la Argentina, AMMAR). In 1999, she was elected as Executive Secretary of the Network of Women Sex workers of Latina America and the Caribbean (Spanish: Red de Mujeres Trabajadoras Sexuales de Latinoamérica y Caribe, RedTraSex).

== Activism ==
Reynaga became a sex worker at 19. After being a victim of institutional violence and experiencing imprisonment multiple times in Argentina, she travelled to work in Spain for a time. She returned to Argentina and founded AMMAR in 1994 in response to police harassment and violence.

According to the organization, between 1996 and 2001, 41 members of AMMAR were murdered. AMMAR operates as a trade union and since 1995 it has been an affiliated member of the Argentine Workers' Central Union (Spanish: Central de Trabajadores de la Argentina). AMMAR has also been part of RedTraSex since 1997; Reynaga has been its Executive Secretary since 1999. The organization works for the defence, promotion, recognition and respect for human rights of sex workers in fifteen countries. Reynaga co-edited The High Heels Movement (Spanish: Un Movimiento de Tacones Altos), a manual for the defense of sex workers' rights published in 2007.

Reynaga has also campaigned on issues related to health (HIV/AIDS) In 2008, she was the first to address the issue of sex worker's rights in a plenary session of the International AIDS Conference, where she asked for better working conditions, health care, recognition of sex work as work, and called on the audience to see sex workers not as the problem, but as "part of the solution".

== Recognition ==
In 2009, the Buenos Aires legislature recognised Reynaga as "Outstanding Public Figure for the Human Rights of Women" (Spanish: Personalidad Destacada de los Derechos Humanos de las Mujeres). In 2014 she was recognised by the Argentinian Senate for her human rights work and leadership against discrimination and stigma, as well as the reclamation of female sex workers as workers. In 2016 she was elected onto a UN advisory board.
