= Port of Pozzallo =

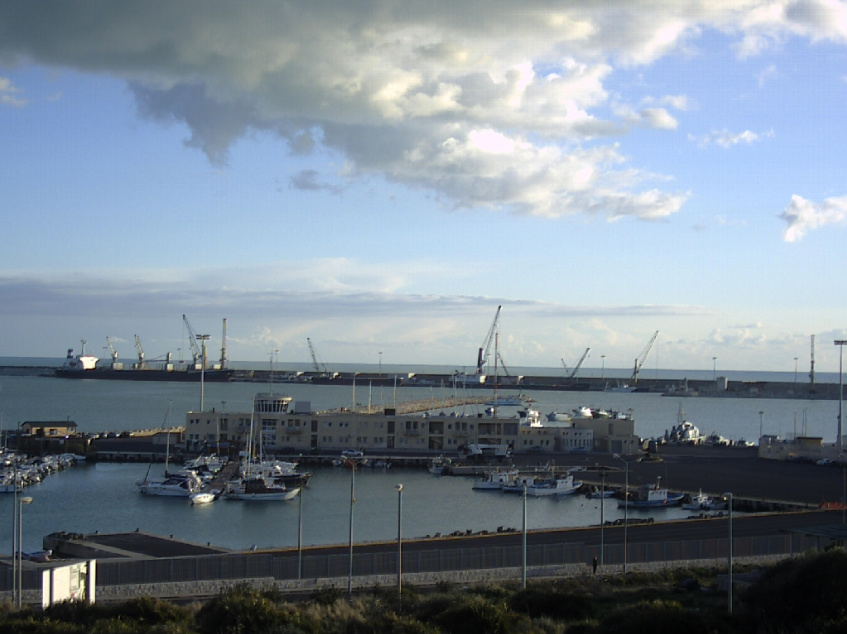
- Port of Pozzallo.
- Click on the map for a fullscreen view

Location
- Country: Italy
- Location: Pozzallo, Province of Ragusa, Sicily
- Coordinates: 36°43′00″N 14°49′52″E

Details
- Opened: 1990s
- Type of harbour: Commercial and Passengers
- Land area: 80.000 sqm + 32.000 sqm
- No. of piers: 570m + 340m

Statistics
- Annual cargo tonnage: 1.5 million tonnes (2008)
- Passenger traffic: 166,406 (2008)
- Website http://www.portopozzallo.com/

The Port of Pozzallo is the major port of the province of Ragusa on the Mediterranean coast of Sicily and is one of the most important harbours on the island. The port was initially designed for a volume of goods of only 500.000 tons a year but today it has risen to over 1.500.000 tons. The port is located at the western end of Pozzallo, which is 50 nautical miles (93 km) from Malta. It is well placed for connections to north Africa.

== History ==
The first steps in construction were taken by the authorities in 1935 in Pozzallo but the first structure was not built until 1960 when a pier was built for petrol products. The late 1980s saw building works started which were not completed until well into the 1990s.

== Passenger service ==
There is a catamaran service to Malta which runs throughout the year. The journey takes 90 minutes.

== Statistics ==
General statistics between 2006 and 2008
Year	2006	2007	2008
Goods^{*}	1.266.852	1.514.755	1.521.095
Passengers	107.000	---	166.406

* figures in tonnes
