= Pozzallo =

Town in Sicily, Italy

- Comune
- Comune di Pozzallo
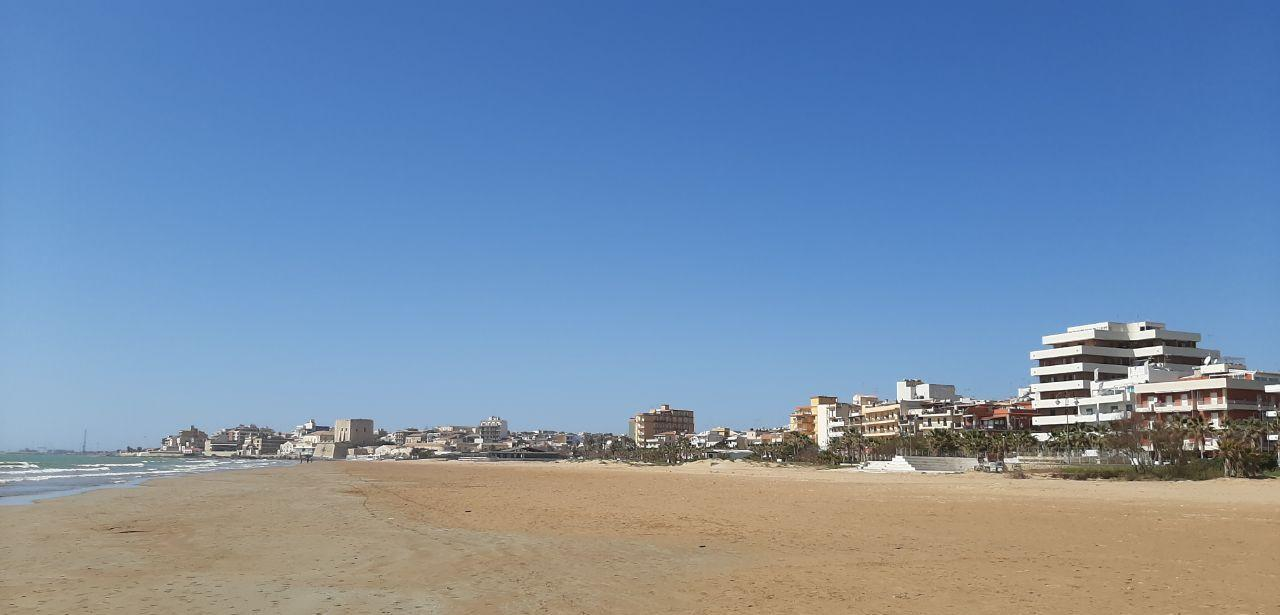
- Pietre Nere Beach

- Coat of arms

- Location within Italy Location within Sicily
- Coordinates: 36°44′N 14°51′E
- Country: Italy
- Region: Sicily
- Province: Ragusa (RG)

Government
  - Mayor: Roberto Ammatuna (PD)

Area
  - Total: 15.38 km^{2} (5.94 sq mi)
- Elevation: 20 m (66 ft)

Population (30 November 2017)
  - Total: 19,495
  - Density: 1,268/km^{2} (3,283/sq mi)
- Demonym: Pozzallesi
- Time zone: UTC+1 (CET)
  - Summer (DST): UTC+2 (CEST)
- Postal code: 97016
- Dialing code: 0932
- Patron saint: St. John the Baptist
- Saint day: June 24
- Website: Official website

Pozzallo (Sicilian: Puzzaddu) is a town and comune in the province of Ragusa, Sicily, southern Italy.

Pozzallo is a major summer destination for tourists: as of July 2025, two beaches in the city hold a Blue Flag award, presented by the FEE and given to beaches which meet strict criteria dealing with water quality, environmental education and information, environmental management, and safety and other services. Very few beaches retain this award in Sicily, including the two located in Pozzallo.

It is also a major port, with daily routes between Sicily and Malta (about 90 minutes on high speed ferry) for passengers on a catamaran service.

The main monument of the city is Torre Cabrera, a 15th century watchtower built by Bernat Juan de Cabrera, son of Bernat II de Cabrera.

== Gallery ==
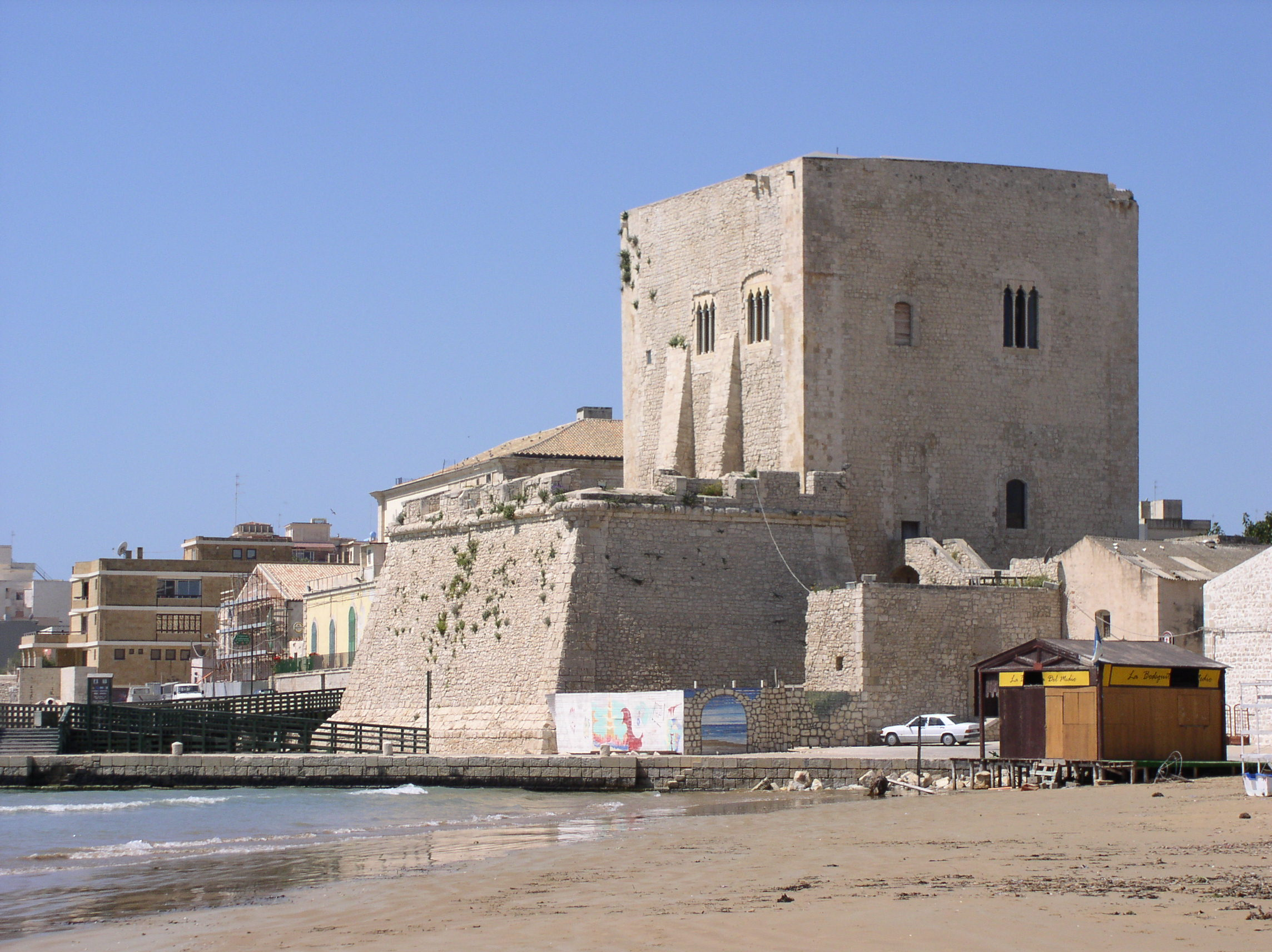
Torre Cabrera, XV century

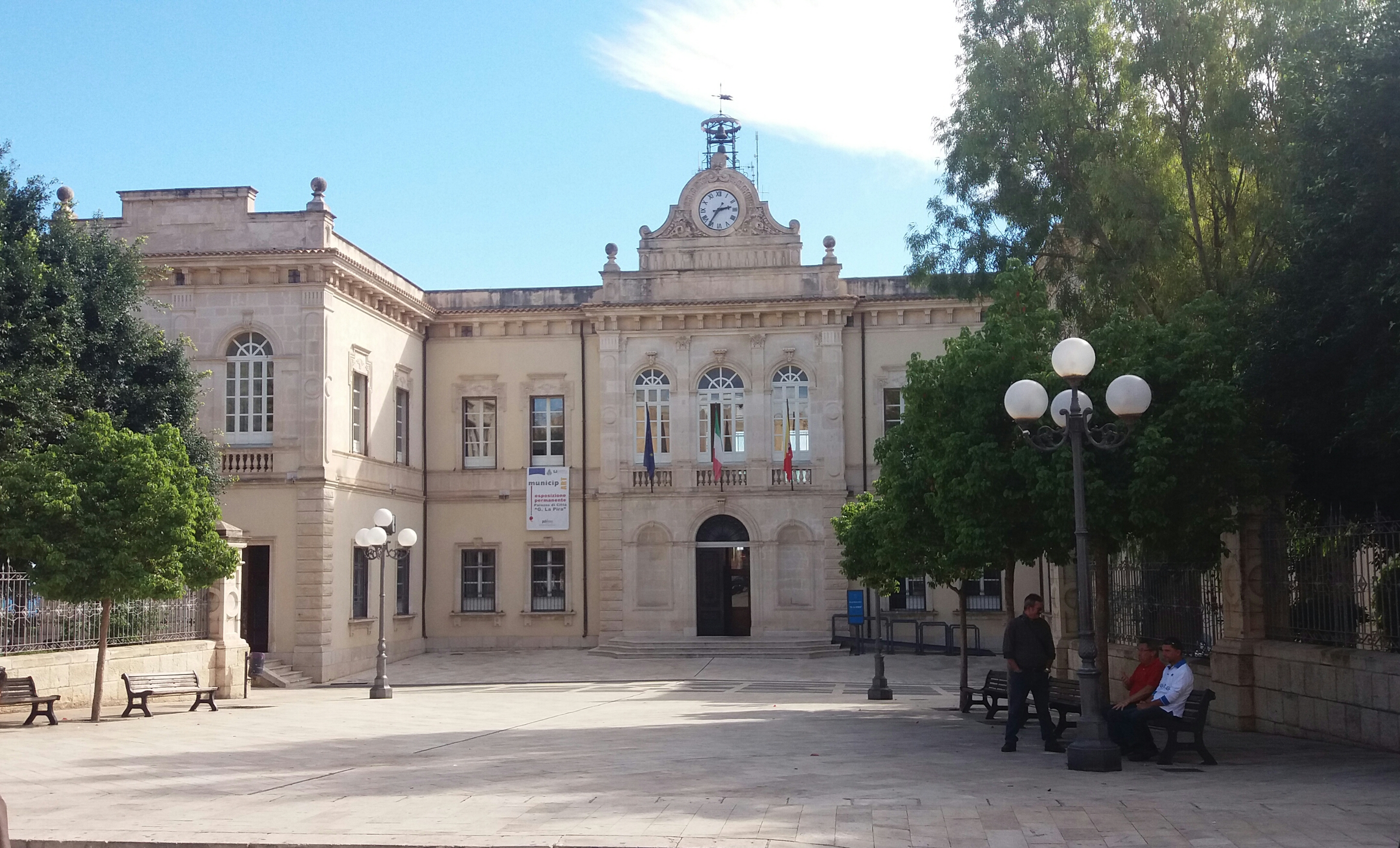
City hall

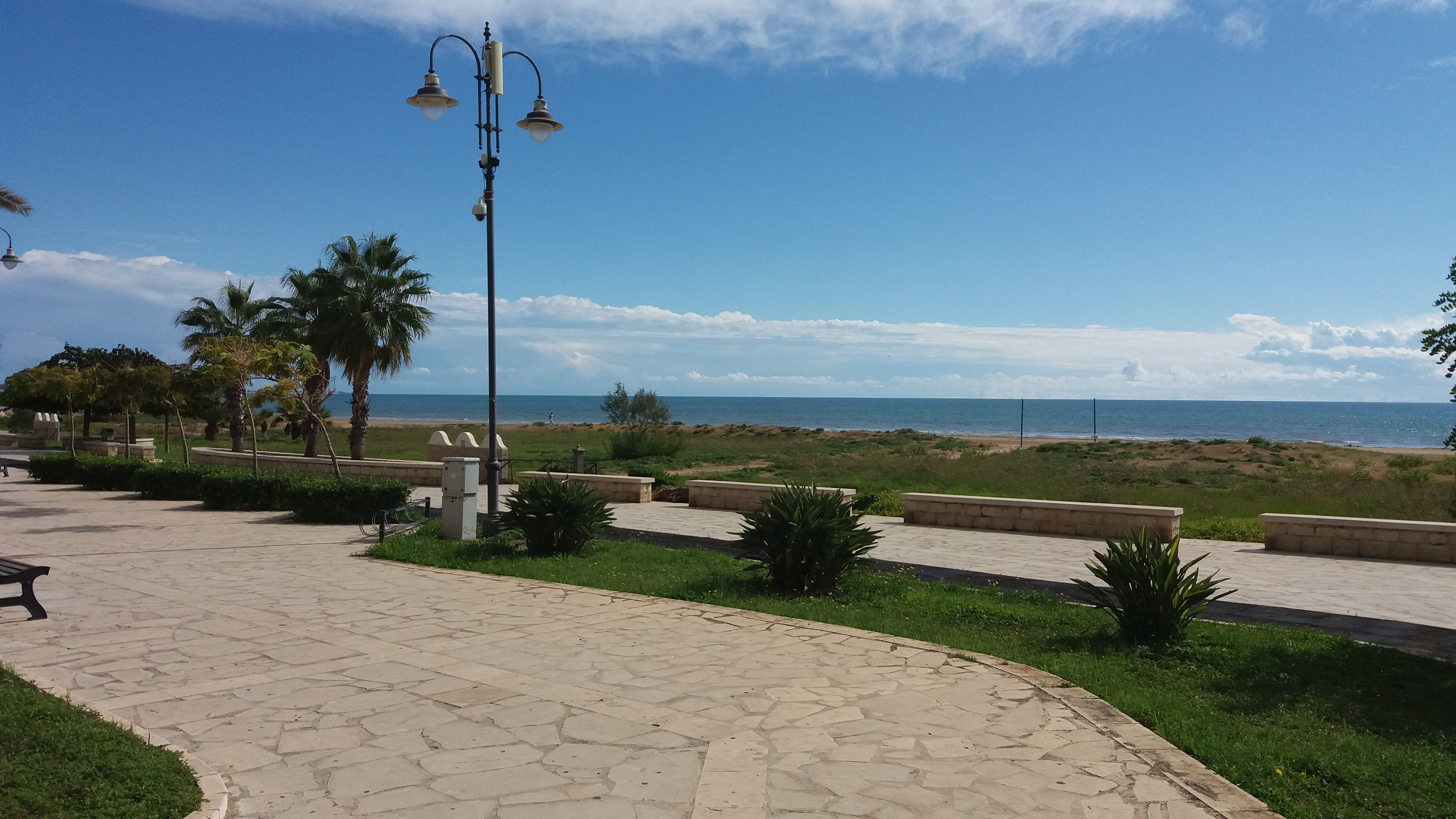
Pietrenere Promenade

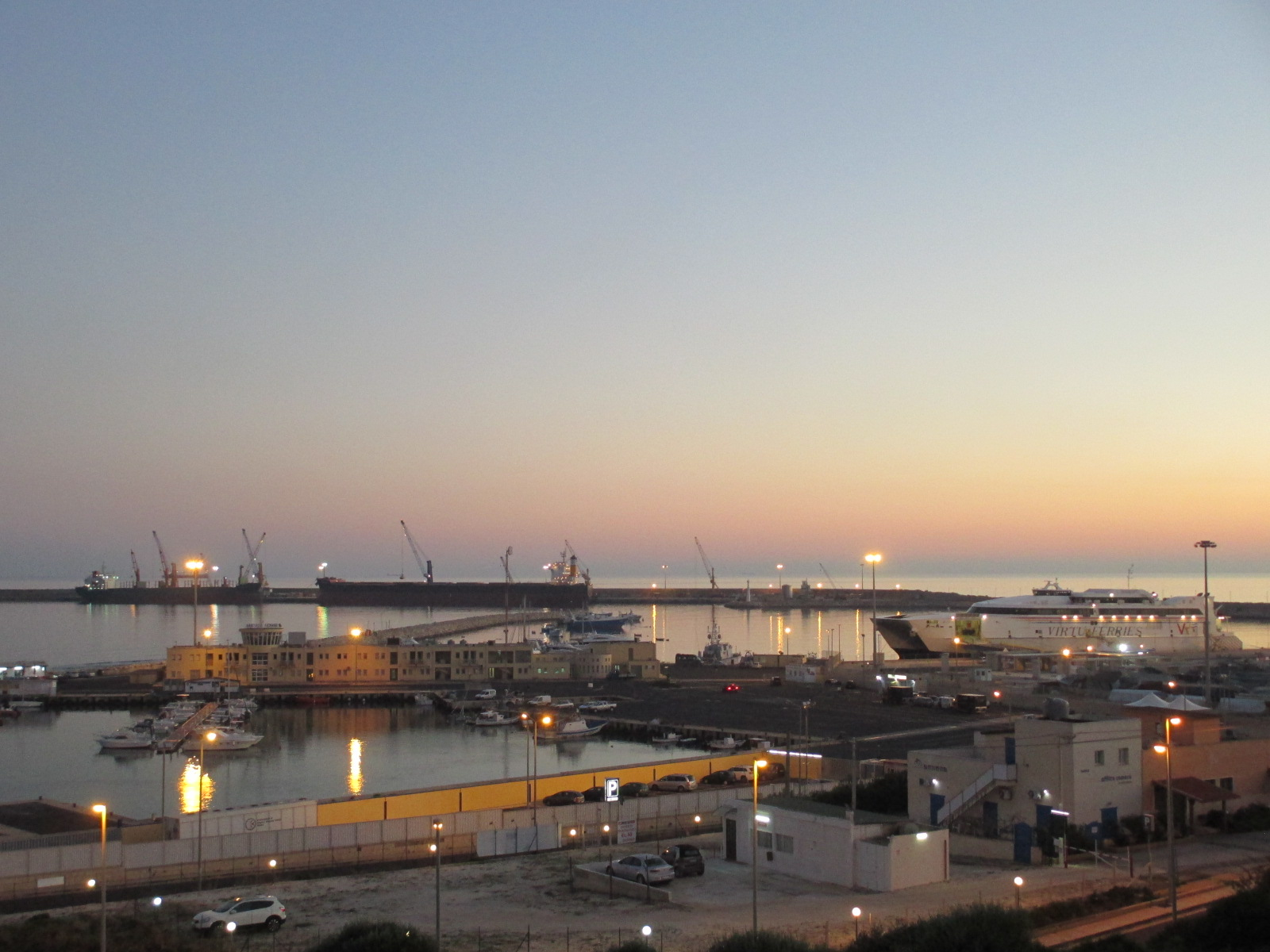
Port of Pozzallo
