= Cabrera =

Cabrera may refer to:

== Places ==
=== Colombia ===
- Cabrera, Cundinamarca
- Cabrera, Santander

=== Dominican Republic ===
- Cabrera, María Trinidad Sánchez
- Loma de Cabrera, Dajabón

=== Mexico ===
- Tlalixtac de Cabrera, Oaxaca

=== Spain ===
- Cabrera, Balearic Islands, an uninhabited islet
- Cabrera d'Anoia, Catalonia
- Cabrera de Mar, Catalonia
- Castrillo de Cabrera, Castile and León
- La Cabrera, Madrid

== Other uses ==
- Cabrera (surname)
- Cabrera (Santa Maria de Corcó)
- Cabrera Nunatak
- Cabrera River, a river of Colombia
- Cabrera, a synonym of the grass genus Axonopus
- House of Cabrera, Counts of Urgell between 1236 and 1314
- José Cabrera Nuclear Power Station, in Almonacid de Zorita, near Madrid, Spain

== See also ==
- Cabrero (disambiguation)
- Caprera (disambiguation)
- Torre Cabrera (disambiguation)
