= Caprera (disambiguation) =

Caprera is an island in the Maddalena archipelago off the coast of Sardinia, Italy.

Caprera may also refer to:

- Italian cruiser Caprera, 1894-1913
- 479 Caprera, a minor planet

== See also ==
- Cabrera (disambiguation)
- Centro Velico Caprera, an Italian sailing school based in Caprera
