= ESERP Business School =

ESERP School of Business and Social Sciences
- ESERP
- Type: Business school
- Established: 1984
- Affiliations: AACSB
- Location: Madrid, Barcelona, Spain
- Website: www.eserp.com

ESERP Business School is a business school in Spain founded by José Daniel Barquero. The school has a university-level education with twenty years in higher education. The school is ranked among some of the top business schools in Spain. ESERP has campuses in Madrid and Barcelona, and is associated with schools in Palma de Mallorca, Alcalá de Guadaira in Seville, and La Coruña, and with some Business Schools nationally and internationally.

== National and international publications ==
ESERP has published different articles in magazines of academic context, in various editorials such as: Mc Graw Hill, Deusto, Planeta, Gestión 2000, Lexnova, Amat Editores and Editorial Furtwangen. ESERP also has several publishing collections, including the "Colección Management ESERP" developed by Harvard Business-Profit and Profit-Wharton Publishers. In addition ESERP, through its research team, has published articles in several scientific journals.

== Academic recognition ==
ESERP is authorized by the Generalitat of Catalunya, Department of Interior and Justice, as a University Foundation.

=== Collaborative Agreements ===
Accrediting Agency for Bachelor's, Master's and Doctoral Degree Programs in Business Administration and Accounting.

Ilustre Colegio Official de Titulados Mercantiles y Empresariales de Barcelona I.C.C.T.M.E.

Ilustre Colegio Official de Titulados Mercantiles y Empresariales de Barcelona.

Colegio de Empresistas de Barcelona.

Consejo Superior Europeo e Iberoamericano de Doctores y Doctores Honoris Causa.
