= Hugo Yasky =

Argentine union leader and politician

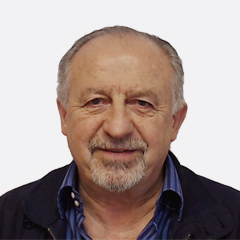

National Deputy
- Incumbent
- Assumed office 10 December 2017
- Constituency: Buenos Aires

Personal details
- Born: 10 October 1949 (age 76) Ramos Mejía, Buenos Aires Province, Argentina
- Party: New Encounter
- Other political affiliations: Front for Victory (until 2019); Citizen's Unity (2017–2019); Frente de Todos (since 2019)
- Occupation: Union leader, politician

Hugo Yasky (born 10 October 1949) is an Argentine teacher, union leader and politician. Since 2006 he has been Secretary-General of the Argentine Workers' Central Union (CTA), a major trade union federation in Argentina. Since 2017 he has additionally been a member of the Argentine Chamber of Deputies representing Buenos Aires Province.

Yasky is also vice president of New Encounter, a kirchnerist political party affiliated to the Frente de Todos.

== Biography ==
Hugo Yasky was born in 1949 in Ramos Mejía, a city in the Greater Buenos Aires Metropolitan Area. His family is of Romanian-Jewish origin, although he was raised in a Jewish secular household. His grandfather was the first Socialist local councillor in Ramos Mejía.

He started working as a teacher in 1971, aged 21. He joined the teachers' union, and voted for the creation of the CTERA union in 1973. He was fired in 1978, during the National Reorganization Process. He started to work again in 1981, in Lomas de Zamora, recreating the local teachers' union. He was elected secretary general of SUTEBA in 1994.

He was elected secretary general of the CTA in 1997. Back then, he opposed the policies of president Carlos Menem, and took part in a hunger strike at the Carpa blanca. There were new elections in 2011, and he was initially defeated by Pablo Micheli, who opposed the president Cristina Fernández de Kirchner, supported by Yasky. The elections were contested, and the judiciary confirmed Yasky as president. Micheli considered that the presidency would have interfered in the elections via loyalist judges, and Yasky that the judiciary confirmed their suspicions about electoral fraud.

He was elected to the Argentine Chamber of Deputies in the 2017 legislative election.

== Electoral history ==
Electoral history of Hugo Yasky
Election	Office	List	#	District	Votes			Result	Ref.
Election	Office	List	#	District	Total	%	P.	Result	Ref.
2017	National Deputy	Unidad Ciudadana	6	Buenos Aires Province	3,383,114	36.28%	2nd (Note: Presented on an electoral list. The data shown represents the share of the vote the entire party/alliance received in that constituency.)	Elected	
2021	National Deputy	Frente de Todos	8	Buenos Aires Province	3,444,446	38.59%	2nd	Elected	
2025	National Deputy	Fuerza Patria	13	Buenos Aires Province	3,558,527	40.91%	2nd	Elected	
