= Prostitution in early 20th-century Argentina =

The early 20th century marked a large period of immigration for Argentina. Prostitution became legalized in 1875. Moreover, due to the Great Depression, another large wave of European immigrants came to Buenos Aires looking for better job opportunities. However, there were cases about women who were tricked into coming to Argentina with the promise of a husband and better life, which turned out to be a pimp for brothels called bordellos.

From 1875 to 1936, the "reglamentarismo" laws allowed for legal prostitution that was regulated by the state, where women who sold sexual favours to more than one man had to have biweekly medical examinations and live alone or work in licensed houses. This article primarily focuses on the social and economic situation happening in Argentina (mostly in Buenos Aires) and the concept of "white slavery" in Buenos Aires and why it grew in popularity. Additionally, due to the large emergence of Jewish immigration among the mentioned European immigration, there are more specific relations to prostitution, including the so-called Zwi Migdal.

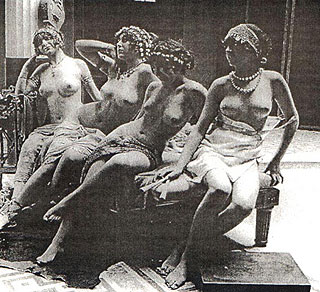
Image of Prostitutes in Buenos Aires, early 1920s

== Historical background ==
The challenging economic conditions in Europe in the early 20th century triggered a sharp increase in immigration. Many people immigrated to Latin America, particularly to Argentina. In the late 1800s and early 19th century, Argentina saw a rise in economic prosperity. While many women in Europe had work, their jobs were mostly low paying and did not lead to much social mobility, so the idea of moving to another country searching for better and wider opportunities was favourably seen, especially moving to a country that was doing well.

At that time, following the French model, prostitution was legal in Argentina, which included its regulation. Reglamentarismo (regulation laws) laws enacted in 1888 included the Dispensario de Salubridad (or Prostitutes' Registry), and Sifilicomio (the venereal disease hospital), to regulate prostitutes and their health, based on European models of the time. However, the Prostitutes' Registry did not include men; these laws only applied to women working in the sex industry. The registry included all women who sold sexual favours to more than one man, and they had to work in a brothel. These laws were later removed, making prostitution illegal after a military coup in 1932.

Additionally, the increase in male immigration to Buenos Aires in the 1880s created a very unbalanced sex ratio, which later led to an increase in pimps coercing women to come to Buenos Aires. In 1927, the League of Nations reported that 75% of the women working in brothels were immigrants. The combination, on the one hand, of the economic hope from immigrants–as well as the legality in comparison to many other countries–led to a rise in people coming to the country, and many of the women coming were working in bordellos. On the other hand, many women, both Argentine and European, were choosing prostitution as a means for more individual freedom over their work.

While there weren't any red light districts, there were certain areas where one would be most likely to see brothels and streetwalkers; things such as pink or white translucent curtains, rather than traditional lace curtains was one way that individuals could contextually identify where the sex workers lived and worked.

== "White slavery" ==
With the increase in immigration, particularly European immigration, came the issue of sex trafficking. In the case of Argentina, a large number of the women that were brought to Buenos Aires were promised a better life and a husband was then actually placed to work in bordellos. In reality, the instances of this trafficking were not as large of an issue as it was made out to be, mainly because 75% of the women working in brothels were immigrants, but the idea of "white slavery," the international traffic of women and children, became widely accepted as truth in Europe, and Argentina was seen as a country that struggled with this issue. White slavery was not used in contrast to African chattel slavery, but rather was a term used to talk about coerced prostitution or sex trafficking. "White slavery" was used when Europeans discussed Argentina as a way to distance themselves from the country, and as a way to get public interest in terms of making legislation against prostitution.

Fear of white slavery was so huge in Europe that they actually brought it to the attention of the League of Nations, a global forum for political and economic discussion. However, many of these discussions were excuses for people who wanted to close their borders, particularly to Argentina, because they had a very large immigrant population in their workforce, especially from said outraged countries. Looking back through the details of white slavery and the instances of women being trafficked or tricked into prostitution by pimps in Argentina, there is very little data to show it was a huge problem, but it still sparked a moral panic.

== Jewish immigration in Buenos Aires ==
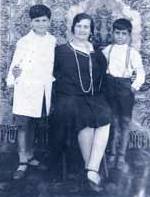
Image of Raquel Liberman, the woman who reported the Varsovia Society to police

Many of the immigrants that were arriving in Argentina were of Eastern European descent, and a large number of them were actually Jewish. In many Eastern European countries, Ashkenazi Jews were heavily excluded from labor, primarily in farming. Many of them were escaping situations of religious persecution, as well as looking for work in a country that at the time, was succeeding economically. This led to them immigrating to Argentina in large numbers.

In the late 1920s, Buenos Aires had an entire neighborhood where the majority of the population were Jewish immigrants. One part of those suburbs held what was called the Varsovia Society, which was made up mostly of brothel owners, pimps, and traffickers. The Varsovia Society was an organization for burial rites for those that were excluded from traditional rites owing to their association with sex work.

Owing to fear of being associated with this group, other Jewish people living in Buenos Aires created code words to separate themselves from the group and avoid harmful stereotypes on Jews. For example, when Raquel Liberman went to the police in 1928 claiming that her husband had forced her back into prostitution and was protected by the Varsovia Society, she had a large backing. The Varsovia Society was later renamed the Zwi Migdal, after one of the founders. Unfortunately, this led to a negative view of Jewish immigrants that continues to be a problem in Argentina today.

The main association with Jews, particularly from those coming from Poland, was precisely the relationship between Jewish women that were trafficked into sex work in Buenos Aires. Associations between the Varsovia Society and sex work as the prime leaders in the Argentine underworld led to an increase in anti-semitic attitudes, which spread to the rest of the world as well.

== Government and legal repercussions ==
In 1904, Alberto Palacios was the first socialist elected to the National Chamber of Deputies, and his outrage against white slavery led to sponsoring a campaign that punished pimps. However, it was not until 1913 when Palacios introduced a different version of his bill against pimps that it was considered. This version included a new definition of white slavery, one that included both male and female minors, and would punish the pimps with a jail sentence, and deportation if convicted more than once as a foreign born person.

During this time of turmoil regarding "white slavery," the only political party interested in the issue was in fact the Socialist Party. With many doctors at the forefront, their goals were to eliminate the spread of diseases, especially venereal disease, or sexually transmitted diseases. To that end, the biggest thing for them was that by legalizing prostitution, that meant that there was space for forced sex labor and therefore venereal disease.

The Sifilicomio laws mentioned above related to health regulation of sex workers was only ever applied to female prostitutes, despite public knowledge of male prostitutes working on the streets and in homes throughout the city. Laws varied from year to year, due to changes in society's outlooks. For example, brothels had tightened legislation on health checks in 1904, but they were later loosened in 1908.
