= Sandra Cabrera =

Argentinian trade unionist

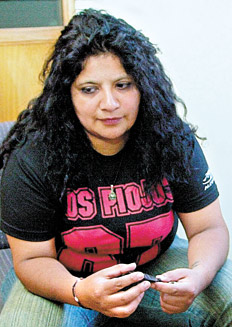
- Sandra Cabrera, wearing a T-shirt with the name of a favored rock band, Los Piojos (The Lice).
- Born: 27 October 1970; San Juan, Argentina
- Died: 27 January 2004 (aged 33); Rosario, Argentina
- Cause of death: gun shot
- Other names: La Sanjua, la sanjuanina
- Known for: anti-corruption and sex worker rights campaigns
- Children: three

Sandra Cabrera (27 October 1970 – 27 January 2004) was an Argentine street-based sex worker, trade unionist, and campaigner for sex workers' rights. She was murdered in 2004 in Rosario, Argentina by the police. Cabrera was murdered for speaking against the police, accusing them of being involved in organized crime, sexually exploiting minors, and for her defense of street workers' rights threatened brothel owners.

== Life ==
Cabrera was born in San Juan, Argentina in 1970. She moved to Rosario in 1994, leaving two children with her mother. People who met her remember her eyes, dark enough to seem black, a wealth of black hair, and her direct gaze, sometimes interpreted as inquisitive, sometimes as defiant. At the time of her murder, she had been planning to travel to another city with a friend to attend a rock festival.

Her first contact with AMMAR (Association of Women Prostitutes of Argentina) occurred in 2000, but she didn't begin working with the union until 2001.

I was working in a corner of the Terminal area and a group of pimps and bouncers from a bar in the area beat me up pretty badly. I reported that in the media and there the girls from Buenos Aires showed up. At first I didn't take them seriously, but the following year, when a group of police beat up another coworker in the south area, we began to work with everything.

— Sandra Cabrera

During Argentina's economic crisis in 2001, Cabrera discovered the power of union association. She complained publicly that the lack of cash had left the women on the street desperately poor, to the point of not knowing if they would have food for their families on Christmas. The Ministry of Social Advancement gave the union sacks of food that Cabrera distributed, working from 8 in the morning to 10 at night.

"There were many women who had nothing to eat, so we started to manage food boxes and work plans... At 10:30 pm my daughter and I fell asleep and when I woke up the other day I worried because we had not celebrated Christmas, but she (her daughter Macarena, 7 years old) told me not to worry about it, because thanks to what we had done the day before, many of our companions had something to celebrate.

— Sandra Cabrera

Cabrera seems to have been a devoted mother to the daughter she called "Maca". She encouraged her education and ensured that she learned computer skills. She took her to the theater. At the time of the murder, Macarena was away at a scouting camp in Mendoza.

Cabrera's work to stop the spread of AIDS and other STDs began in October, 2001.

The word of someone unknown is not the same as one of us talking to our colleagues, with our language, explaining how to take care of ourselves through our experience. There are women who did not know how to protect themselves when they [clients] ask for a francesa [oral sex]... We have a manual with pictures of healthy vaginas next to diseased vaginas, healthy penises next to diseased penises, because for us things also enter our eyes.

— Sandra Cabrera

Lacking resources for its own place, AMMAR's Rosario chapter maintained an office with the Government Workers Association, where the AMMAR women were known affectionately as "the Sanjua gang", after Cabrera's place of origin. Cabrera reportedly had a love/hate relationship with AMMAR's national leadership. Her interactions with Elena Reynaga, Secretary General of the union at the time, have been described as "explosive". Reynaga acknowledged that no one she worked with fought her as Cabrera did, but she also acknowledged Cabrera's effectiveness:

She cared about the others, the injustices spurred her on, she got what she wanted.

— Elena Reynaga

Organizing gave her a position in a social network that she couldn't get any other way.

She was very lacking in [i.e. hadn't received] affection, like so many of us. In the organization she began to find something we all seek, to be recognized for something and to be important.

— Elena Reynaga

And in Rosario, she found that recognition.

We admire her strength, how she achieves things for us. It makes us think that if we unite we can aspire to a retirement, to a more dignified life.

— Rosario sex worker

She was the consummate union organizer. For two years before her murder, she used her motorcycle to take her every place in Rosario where her colleagues were working the street, listening to their complaints and planning how to use the union to protect them. After she died this was how many people remembered her; on her bike, distributing condoms, asking about people's problems. She learned how to make statements to the news media that the media would pick up and publish, spreading her message.

The police are chasing street workers instead of combating child prostitution or pimping, which are punishable by law. In fact they commit pimping, because they live by extracting money through blackmail of women who practice prostitution.

— Sandra Cabrera

Perhaps Cabrera's hardest task was just persuading her colleagues that a union was possible. Claudia Lucero, her close friend, sometime dancing partner, godmother of her daughter, and eventual successor as secretary general of the Rosario chapter of AMMAR, had to be won over.

When she proposed it, I did not want to know anything. I told her it was crazy, that it could not be that we had a union, because we had never had anything. Society always had us as the lowest, for me it was like we did not exist. When the crisis came in late 2001, Sandra got social plans. There I started to go to the headquarters of the Central of Argentine Workers (CTA), but still thought that we could not get to where we arrived today. When I started to go, I met all the union guys who treated us differently, they said 'how are you, girls.' There I began to realize that we were not what they had made us believe. Because we suffered so much repression, the police made us believe that we were nobody. There I realized that it was not so.

— Claudia Lucero

Other street workers had other reasons for not joining. Stella Maris Longoni found it easier just to pay her police extortionist fifty pesos a week and be left in peace, until the day she paid and the police arrested her anyway. Released from jail, with police warnings not to join the union still ringing in her ears, she went straight to Cabrera and AMMAR.

== Lead up to murder ==
... for much more than two years it was said during the night that they were going to find her dead, because they said she does not respect the codes...

— testimony of Rosa Maria Teresa Signorelli

During Sandra Cabrera's murder investigation, a source inside the investigation told a news reporter that Cabrera had been defending herself on three fronts: the violence and risk of working on the street, the assaults arranged by the brothel businesses she and her independent street colleagues were competing with, and the harassment and threats from the police whose graft networks she was disrupting. The corrupt connection between the brothel owners and the police meant that Cabrera's struggle to protect street workers was necessarily a struggle against corruption.

By way of background, the journalist Carlos del Frade has described a meeting in 1991 between Rodolfo Enrique Riegé, Secretary of Public Security for the province of Santa Fe, and Atilio Bléfari, head of police in Rosario. Riegé informed Bléfari that if he didn't increase the graft revenues that he was paying to Riegé, Riegé would relieve him of command and force him to retire. The resulting struggle for control of the city of Rosario was not a struggle between justice and corruption, but a struggle between a corrupt police officer and his even more corrupt superior. The document that del Frade cites as a source goes on to list the sources of extralegal income the police were collecting, which included theft of goods during transport, bank robbery, car theft, gambling, exploitation of juveniles in nightclubs and discos, and medical quackery, among other things. Category number two was income from the Public Morality units of the police, and included

drug traffickers, drug addicts, prostitutes, exploiters, pimps, nightclubs, discos, motels

Since the nightclubs and discos were fronts for brothels, this can be summarized as drugs and prostitution.

As part of her campaign for sex worker rights, Cabrera fought for the elimination of the articles of the provincial Misdemeanor Code that criminalized prostitution. Different officers in Rosario's Public Morality unit were able to use the Code to play different sides. Some officers were paid by the brothel owners to enforce the Code against the street workers who were competing with the brothels. Other officers collected bribes from street workers for not enforcing the Code.

Another complication was her romantic involvement with an officer of the Federal police, Diego Parvlucyk. She acted as an informant and he gave her drugs that had been seized during police operations, which she sold. Initially her connection with the Federal police seemed to give her some protection from the provincial police, or at least a feeling of protection, but the relationship with Parvlucyk became more difficult and he was later arrested for her murder, although released and never tried. For many of Argentina's sex workers, this relationship didn't seem unusual.

Our colleagues, who are human beings and have feelings, fall in love with the police and pimps.

— Elena Reynaga

From 1999 to 2002, there is record of ten formal complaints made by Cabrera against the police. Most of them involve harassment or threats against her or a colleague.

On March 4, 2003, Marcela Patricia Morelli, a street sex worker and member of AMMAR, filed a complaint against officers of the Ludueña neighborhood police station. She and two trans sex workers had been detained by the officers in what she felt was an excessive manner and with "a humiliating treatment". One of the trans sex workers was released after two hours, but Morelli and the other remained for more than six hours. The police removed money and clothing from the other trans sex worker, humiliated the person, and left the person lying on the floor, naked. In the morning the station chief arrived and told them that he didn't want "male or female prostitutes" in his jurisdiction, and threatened more violent measures. He threatened to drag Morelli by her hair if he saw her again.

As leader of AMMAR's Rosario chapter, Cabrera made the following statements.

We are asking for security. We are fed up with being presented to the merchants of the neighborhoods as sources of insecurity, when many times the presence of prostitutes has avoided robberies.

We know that we are at fault and do not refuse to be delayed by the police in routine checks, but most of us have school-age children and we have already talked to government ministry personnel so we will not be detained in days during the school year, in order to send our children to school.

These things are repeated every time there are changes of leadership in the sections. When we are stopped we do not refuse to show the latest test results for HIV, despite the fact that the National AIDS Act, 23,798, guarantees the confidentiality of those results.

— Sandra Cabrera

On September 10, 2003, Cabrera organized a formal complaint against the chief and deputy chief of the Public Morality unit of the police, accusing them of harassing sex workers at the stops near the Rosario Bus Terminal in order to protect brothels in the area from competition from independent street workers. An investigation turned up evidence that they were providing protection for a brothel whose women included underage girls and women trafficked from the Dominican Republic. The complaint also accused police officers of forcing street-based sex workers to pay bribes in order to work. The chief and deputy chief were removed, and the new head of the Public Morality section was a woman, nominally chosen to ensure that the corrupt practices ended, but perhaps in reality chosen to take the pressure off without actually changing anything. Not quite five months later, when Cabrera was murdered, the disgraced ex-chief of Public Morality had been reassigned as head of the Zavalla police station.

Following the complaint, some of the bars the two police chiefs had been protecting closed, and a few others stopped making payments to the police. One of the sex workers who joined Cabrera in the complaint testified during the murder investigation that Cabrera had expressed fear that the police would retaliate.

On October 9, someone called the headquarters of the Government Workers Association, where AMMAR kept an office, and said "Tell Sandra that the girl will die before tomorrow." The girl was Cabrera's eight-year-old daughter, Macarena. From then until shortly before Cabrera's murder, the police Personal Security unit kept a nightly guard on her home.

A few days later, an anonymous complaint filed in the juvenile courts claimed that "Sandra sent the girl to beg and did not go to school." A social worker investigated and confirmed that Macarena had, in fact, been going to school.

On October 17 a sex worker was assaulted by a cyclist who struck her strongly in the head with a chain. The women went to the police and together they searched the area, but her assailant was never found.

At some point, while the police guard was temporarily away from Cabrera's home, someone got in and beat her. At another point, two men got into her home, put a gun to the head of her dog, and told her to stop fucking with them.

The last complaint Cabrera helped file, four days before her murder, involved an officer who charged a woman fifty pesos a week for the privilege of working without trouble from the police. In spite of punctual payments, the woman was arrested by the Public Morality police, who informed her that the officer she was paying was no longer working in that division. When she announced that she was going to join AMMAR, the Morality police threatened her with daily arrests. Cabrera went with her to file an extortion complaint and was with her when she spoke to the news media. Cabrera told a reporter that she was afraid that someone from the Public Morality unit would come back for her.

During her murder investigation, the investigating judge found evidence of fifteen death threats against her.

== Murder ==
The testimony of the comrades and the prostitutes may not have had the weight that was expected. It can be a matter of fear and pressure... Perhaps Sandra's companions were affected by issues of self-security, of their children or their family when it came to involving people who could somehow exercise some power over them... I believe that the case would have had another course with more protection.

— Ismael Manfrín, prosecutor

=== Evidence ===
Testimony indicates that Sandra Cabrera was standing at her usual corner with a colleague at around 4:30 on the morning of 27 January 2004. She was approached by a client and walked toward him, away from her colleague. The colleague never saw the man's face and didn't recognize him. From behind, he appeared to be tall and thin, in light shorts. Cabrera and the client left together to go to her home.

She was found dead from a shot in the back of the neck. The investigation determined that the muzzle of the gun had been pushed against her neck and the gun was partially supported by her skull when it was fired. Her body was two blocks from the Omnibus Terminal, one block from the stop where she worked. There were no scuff marks on her sandals or clothes, indicating that she had not been dragged, but had been killed where she was found. The bullet that killed her has been sometimes reported to be a 9 mm, but news reports at the time of the investigation said the investigators found a .32 caliber slug. (Various police departments in Argentina have issued 9 mm handguns to their officers (Bersa Thunder 9), but the .32 caliber bullet is considered too small for police work.)

Her pants were pulled down below her hips but her underpants were in their normal position. A condom wrapper was found next to her body. The police lab found semen in her vaginal and anal cavities. Testimony indicated that she had had sex with her lover a couple of hours before she was last seen alive.

Analysis by forensic experts suggests a planned assassination, not a spur-of-the-moment crime of passion. Her killer was probably either familiar with the area, or had cased it ahead of time, and led her to the entry of a private house where they were less likely to be observed. The murder weapon was a small caliber handgun that was easier to hide than the larger handguns issued by police departments. The killer apparently knew how to use a smaller weapon to ensure that Cabrera was killed by one shot, without the need for a second. The forensic analysts believe that he stood behind her, held her head with his left hand, forced the muzzle of the gun against her neck, and fired while standing with his knees slightly flexed. She died instantly. Diego Parvluczyk, former deputy chief of the Dangerous Drugs Division of the Federal Police was the only individual arrested for Cabrera's femicide but later acquitted for lack of evidence.

The forensic report concluded:

The possibility is raised of a killer who has chosen circumstances of time and place, has killed at the right moment of least resistance of the victim, has held the corpse so that it does not strike with suddenness when falling and has left without leaving evidence of his presence. The hypothesis speaks of a professional profile of the victimizer with knowledge in the area, the habits of the victim and the task to be performed. Likewise the neatness of their movements must be considered. This consideration offers the probable alternative that the assailant knew the victim during a previous encounter provoked precisely to obtain data of habits and circumstances in which the victim moved.

=== Reaction ===
Her murder was a shock to the national political system. Almost immediately the national Minister of Justice got in touch with the Santa Fe governor, and the Secretary for National Human Rights came to Rosario to get involved in the case. Within two days the investigating judge had convened a multi-disciplinary meeting at the Institute of Forensic Medicine with ten forensic experts; an extraordinary step in any murder case, much less a case involving a street-based sex worker.

The investigating judge laid out three lines of investigation: she was killed by a client, she was killed by the brothel owners, or she was killed by the police. At the time, there were no reports of clients committing crimes against prostitutes. Sources in the police department reported that the police were seriously looking into the possibility that she had been killed by someone hired by the brothel owners. Her first encounter with AMMAR occurred when she complained to the media about being assaulted by pimps and bouncers, i.e. by men associated with a bar that was a front for a brothel. The two chiefs of the Public Morality unit who were removed after her complaint were being paid by brothel owners to drive off street sex workers. Her struggle against the brothel owners went back many years.

Everyone else assumed it was the police. The police in Argentina have a history of killing reformers and killing sex workers. A few years earlier, investigators in Mar del Plata had uncovered a police conspiracy to use a fictional serial killer to cover up the murder of thirty two sex workers, killed because they wanted to leave their pimps, who were paying the police. The Santa Fe police killed the social activist Claudio Lepratti during the disturbances of 2001 when he tried to warn them off from firing at a school where children were eating lunch. At Cabrera's funeral procession, the AMMAR members shouted "We know, we know, that our colleague was killed by the police."

Among political insiders and unionists there were two theories about the police. The first was that they killed Cabrera to silence her. The second was that they killed her to warn the new provincial government in Santa Fe to stop interfering with the graft. Changes of administrations in Santa Fe had typically been accompanied by some sort of organized criminal action by the police, just to remind everybody of the rules of the game. Carlos del Frade relates that during Obeid's first administration as governor of Santa Fe, he removed a half dozen police officers who had been involved in state sponsored torture and terrorism. The police responded with a message that if he removed any more police officers, it would break the institutional peace in the province.

The previous administration had responded to Cabrera's complaints by removing high-ranking officers for corruption, and the new administration was arresting street level officers for extortion. This second theory implies that Cabrera's killers just wanted to warn off the government from the dangerous experiment of punishing police officers for corruption.

To show its resolve in moving the case forward, the provincial government quickly appointed a committee of five police officers to investigate. The committee was under the direct orders of José Manuel Maldonado, head of Regional Unit II of the provincial police; in effect, chief of police for the city of Rosario. Previously, as head of the Judicial Police, he had been accused of shielding officers involved with the killing of Claudio Lepratti and protecting 1st Precinct policemen accused of raping a sixteen-year-old girl. According to the assistant secretary of the CTA (the union federation AMMAR belongs to), Maldonado ensured that proceeds from the payments extorted from sex workers and the money that pimps paid for protection were distributed to officers and politicians appropriately. The unit he currently headed had been linked three years previously to extrajudicial executions and deaths in custody. So he was head of a police unit accused of exactly the type of assassination people were accusing the police of in the Cabrera case, he was believed to be responsible for administering the graft that she had been campaigning against, and he appeared to be experienced in covering up police crimes. The CTA and the Rosario association of prosecutors demanded his removal.

After several months of investigation, the investigating judge ordered the detention of Parvlucyk, the Federal police officer Cabrera had been involved with, and charged him with murder. In addition to their troubled relationship, Parvlucyk had stated in his testimony that his immediate superior had asked him to silence Cabrera, and his superior has stated that Parvlucyk always complied with orders. On appeal, the judge's decision was overturned, and neither Parvlucyk nor anyone else has been tried for Cabrera's murder. The panel of judges that overturned the decision of the investigating judge referred to some of the witnesses as ""people with street activities who pass their mornings with a wandering itinerary". One of the appeals judges discredited the testimony of over twenty street-based sex workers because they were women who "have an activity that can not be described as good morals," according to the journalist Carlos Del Frade. He claims that the possibility that Parvlucyk killed Cabrera because he was ordered to silence her was never properly investigated. Del Frade also claims that the link between Cabrera's murder and the structural corruption in the provincial and Federal police organizations was never investigated.

Among the members of AMMAR's Rosario chapter, the reaction to Cabrera's murder was a mixture of fear and bravado. "If AMMAR dies, we fatten the pigs," they told each other, and "She paid for everything, and that's why the fight continues." But when Cabrera's friend Claudia Lucero took over as general secretary of the chapter, she found it sometimes difficult to reach out to her colleagues. They warned her, "Don't get involved, you'll end up like Sandra." A lawyer who worked for CTA, the trade union federation that AMMAR is part of, and who represented AMMAR during the murder investigation, said that some of the women who might have testified refused to get involved in the case, and others left Santa Fe province out of fear. Four years later, Lucero reported similar fear among the street workers.

Fear is present. When I tell you, let's get together, come, they're afraid. I can not tell them we are going to a march or when we are going to do some research work as well. To myself they say "How do you keep going"?

— Claudia Lucero

As for Macarena Cabrera, Sandra's daughter, one can only imagine her reaction to it all. Growing up she had access to the Internet and knew about the failure of the murder investigation and the various theories people proposed. Nine years after the murder she went to the Rosario branch of the Government Workers Association, the union that had provided AMMAR Rosario with office space and where her mother had been well known, and told them she really wanted to know what happened to her mother. They were probably able to give her a lot of information, but the source for this says that actual explanations were in short supply.

== Legacy ==
=== Influence ===
==== RedTraSex Archive/Virtual Library ====
To honor Sandra Cabrera's legacy, RedTraSex named their virtual library after her as the first sex worker-themed archive.

==== Public Morality police unit ====
If the police were, in fact, trying to send a message to the new provincial administration, it backfired. Cabrera's murder gave the government the political cover it needed to eliminate the Public Morality section of the provincial police. High on the list of her legacies is the fact that two days after her murder, the Santa Fe Minister of Government announced that the Public Morality section would be dissolved and the officers that served in it would be distributed among different units. He said that the move had been under consideration since the beginning of the new administration:

... because it is an obsolete unit that allows a certain degree of corruption, without passing judgment on the officers that served in it.

— Alberto Gianneschi, Minister of Government in Santa Fe province at the time of Sandra Cabrera's murder

But he acknowledged that he was making the announcement in the context of Cabrera's murder.

==== Misdemeanor Code ====
On the other hand, the government wanted to amend, rather than repeal, the articles of the Misdemeanor Code that criminalized sex work and transgenderism. The political opposition favored straight repeal, but the government was concerned about voter reaction and opposition from the Church. As the Minister of Government put it with Victorian sensibility:

We are looking for a balance between the claims of the defense of modesty and scandalous prostitution through a new bill.

— Alberto Gianneschi

As the new secretary general of AMMAR's Rosario chapter, Claudia Lucero continued the campaign to repeal the articles.

"The contravention codes are not repealed. The situation is the same, the only thing that changed is that there is no more Public Morality, but there are the precincts, there is the command [police unit], the police are still chasing us. After Sandra's death, a month later, we had a partner in Baigorria who was threatened and beaten. The harassment continues, the mobile units stop us, some police come and say 'you have to go because the neighbor says' and that is a lie. They make it up so that the sex worker gives them money and they let her work. The commands are in the red zone and that's because the codes are not repealed and the police still have power.

— Claudia Lucero

For AMMAR Rosario, the campaign was an important rallying point. The constant police harassment intimidated the women in the street, but it also gave them strong motivation to take steps, however risky, to join the campaign against laws that legitimized the harassment. And since the campaign had been Cabrera's initiative, it gave the union frequent opportunity to invoke the name of Sandra Cabrera, who had become an important symbol for sex workers' rights.

I said when Sandra passed, let's try to continue because otherwise everything is dying. And that is the commitment and at the same time persuades me that the death of Sandra was not in vain, beyond that we do not have justice. But it was not in vain, because we followed the path she left us. The day that the codes are repealed will not be our achievement, that's the way Sandra prepared us, so the achievement will be hers.

— Claudia Lucero

Finally, in 2010, after years of lobbying and activism by AMMAR Rosario, a different administration repealed the articles of the law that Cabrera had campaigned against. While she didn't live to see the victory, she was part of the fight, and it was a more fundamental restructuring of society's relationship with sex work than eliminating a police unit.

==== Rosario ====
Walter Miranda, who had been removed as chief of the Public Morality unit following Cabrera's complaint because he had been providing protection to brothels that trafficked underage girls and foreign women, as well as extorting bribes from street-based sex workers, continued to advance through the ranks. By 2012 he had become head of Regional Unit II, which gave him control of all provincial police forces in the city of Rosario. The brothels in the area around the bus terminal that he had been protecting were still there. During an investigation of trafficking in humans, a phone tap of one of the brothel owners recorded the owner asking how to go about selling cocaine. The answer was that he should bribe Hugo Tognoli, the highest ranking police officer in the province of Santa Fe. Laura Cosido, a judge in the Federal Chamber of Rosario, stated that "There was never such an open relationship between narcos and police." AMMAR, Cabrera's union, complained that the drug and human trafficking networks were the same.

Around the same time, Claudia Lucero was complaining that in spite of the revocation of the articles of the Misdemeanor Code that criminalized street prostitution, the police were still finding ways to extort money from street workers.

"I had to go and talk to the commissioner of the 7th precinct, after a worker was detained in the terminal area and extorted by the police.

— Claudia Lucero

Shortly thereafter, sex work in Rosario went through the same change in law and enforcement that the rest of Argentina experienced. The anti-trafficking law, passed a few years earlier, began to be enforced consistently, ending the legal regulation of brothels by municipalities. One of the last cabarets in Rosario was closed when city inspectors found an entertainer performing oral sex on a customer. Announcing that they were closing the place, the inspectors were attacked by the madame and the female employees, who threw glasses and punched and kicked the inspectors. Driven into the street, they took refuge in a local bar where the women found them and again attacked, throwing and breaking tables and stealing the tape used to officially seal a closed business. Not everyone in Argentina embraced the new anti-trafficking regime.

Some of the women who had worked in the cabarets and whiskerías that fronted for brothels moved to private apartments operated by the same type of people who had operated the brothels. The motels that once rented to independent sex workers now turn them away in order to avoid problems with the city. In response, some of the women have organized casitas, where a group of women rent a house and set aside a part of the earnings from each client session to cover the rent. Basically, women who were previously working in brothels are still working in brothels, and women who were previously independent are still independent. Georgina Orellano, secretary general of AMMAR as of 2017, says of the new legal regime that "It took all the activity to a much darker and hidden place."

For the street based workers, Orellano says that since Mauricio Macri became Argentina's president, institutional violence has increased in public spaces.

We suffer more searches, more humiliation, more payment of fines and the difficulty of making use of the street. Lately, there are reports that the police drive the girls away, beat them, do not let them work, ask them for sexual favors and ask for money.

— Georgina Orellano

Orellano says that the new prohibitionist regime recognizes only victims and pimps, and criminalizes women who enter sex work voluntarily. The current municipal law on sex work in Rosario, passed in 2013, mentions assistance and support; Orellano says that the city department responsible for implementing the assistance has helped so few women that they can be counted on the fingers of the two hands. AMMAR's last survey found one hundred women working the streets in Rosario, and it is estimated that another six hundred are working indoors.

The legal and police system that Sandra Cabrera struggled with has changed. Where it once tolerated brothels it has become prohibitionist. The laws that once referred to street based sex work as "scandalous" and an "offense to modesty" now speak of assisting sex workers. The owners of regulated brothels who once assaulted independent sex workers in the streets, or paid the police to do the same, now operate illegally in private apartments, driven underground by the prohibitionist movement that currently opposes AMMAR in the media and the legislatures. The political projects of Cabrera and AMMAR's founders have been challenged by new social forces with different concepts of sex worker rights and agency. And yet street based sex workers face the same problems, including police violence and extortion. Perhaps Cabrera's most important legacy is illustrated by a little story told by Claudia Lucero a year after Cabrera's death:

A short while ago the Command [Radio Command, a police unit] wanted to take bribes from a member [of AMMAR], and it turns out that she is unionized. She told them to take her prisoner, but she would call her lawyer as soon as she got to the police station because she had that right. The cops wanted to arrange something, give them money, or go to jail. But when she told them that, they dropped her at a corner and left.

— Claudia Lucero

=== Recognition ===
Nine days after Cabrera's murder, marches were held in Rosario, Buenos Aires, and Salta province, demanding justice and sex workers rights. The counts of participants weren't given for the marches, but the Rosario march was described as "multitudinous" and included a cross section of Rosario civic society, including leaders of political parties, unions, and human rights groups. Another march in Rosario a month later was described in the same terms and included the same civic groups. These marches have been repeated over the years on the anniversary of her murder, up to the present.

In 2012 the director Lucrecia Mastrangelo released a film titled, Sex, dignity and death: Sandra Cabrera, unpunished crime.

In 2017, a small public square in the area around the bus terminal where she had worked was named in her honor.
