= Cabrero, Cáceres =

Municipality in Extremadura, Spain

Coordinates: 40°07′N 5°53′W

Concello de Cabrero
- Municipality
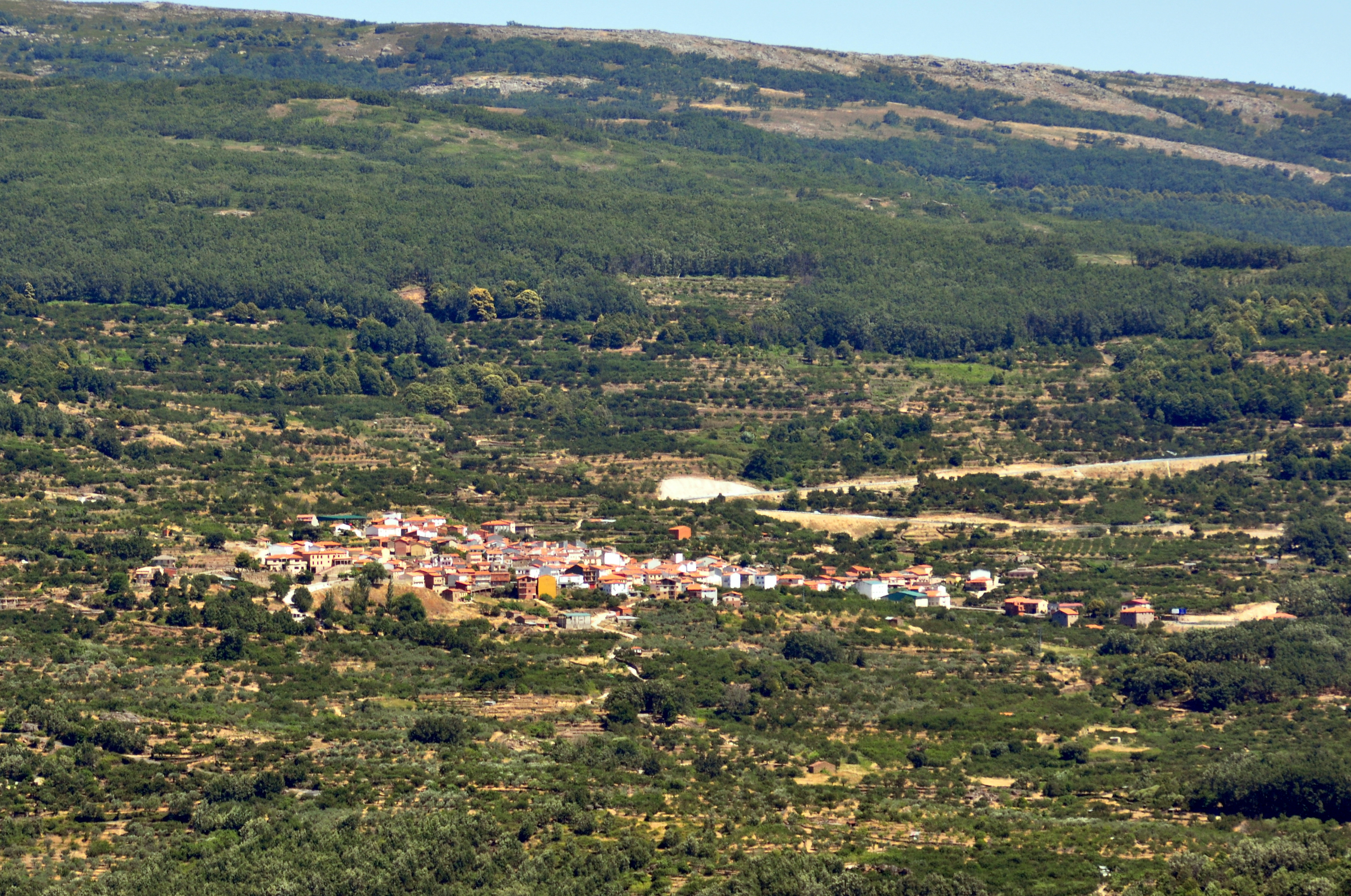
- View of Cabrero from El Torno

- Coat of arms
- Interactive map of Concello de Cabrero
- Country: Spain
- Autonomous community: Extremadura
- Province: Cáceres
- Comarca: Sierra de Gata

Area
  - Total: 7 km^{2} (2.7 sq mi)

Population (2011)
  - Total: 374
  - Density: 53/km^{2} (140/sq mi)
- Time zone: UTC+1 (CET)
  - Summer (DST): UTC+2 (CEST)

Cabrero is a municipality in the province of Cáceres and autonomous community of Extremadura, Spain. The municipality covers an area of 7 square kilometres (2.7 sq mi) and as of 2011 had a population of 374 people.

== See also ==
- List of municipalities in Cáceres
