= Cabrera Nunatak =

Nunatak in Marie Byrd Land, Antarctica

Cabrera Nunatak (75°46′S 128°12′W) is a nunatak 6.5 nautical miles (12 km) northeast of Putzke Peak in the McCuddin Mountains, Marie Byrd Land. It was mapped by the United States Geological Survey from surveys and from U.S. Navy air photos, 1959–65, and named by the Advisory Committee on Antarctic Names for Quirino Cabrera, a U.S. Navy Construction Mechanic at Byrd Station, 1966 and 1969.
