= Nelson Cabrera =

Nelson Cabrera may refer to:

- Nelson Cabrera (Uruguayan footballer) (born 1967), former Uruguayan footballer
- Nelson David Cabrera (born 1983), Bolivian football defender
