= Víctor Cabrera =

Víctor Cabrera may refer to:

- Víctor Cabrera (Argentine footballer) (born 1993), Argentine football defender
- Víctor Cabrera (Chilean footballer) (1957–2026), Chilean footballer
- Víctor Hugo Cabrera (born 1968), Colombian actor
- Víctor Cabrera, member of the Dominican reggaeton production duo Luny Tunes
