= José Daniel Barquero Cabrero =

Spanish businessman and university teacher

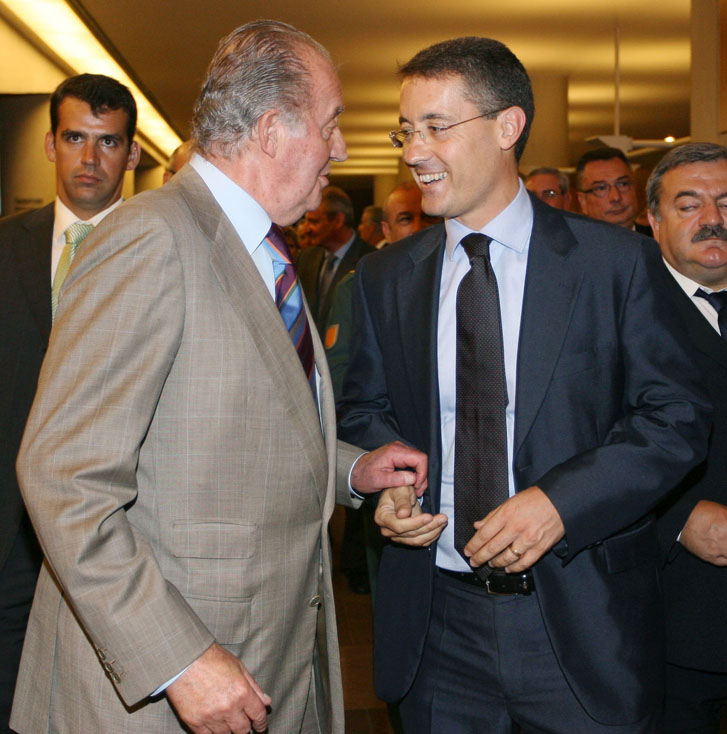
- Barquero Cabrero with King Juan Carlos I.
- Born: José Daniel Barquero Cabrero; 13 June 1966 (age 60); Barcelona, Spain
- Occupations: Businessman, professor

José Daniel Barquero Cabrero (born 13 July 1966) is a Spanish businessman and university teacher.

== Career in business ==
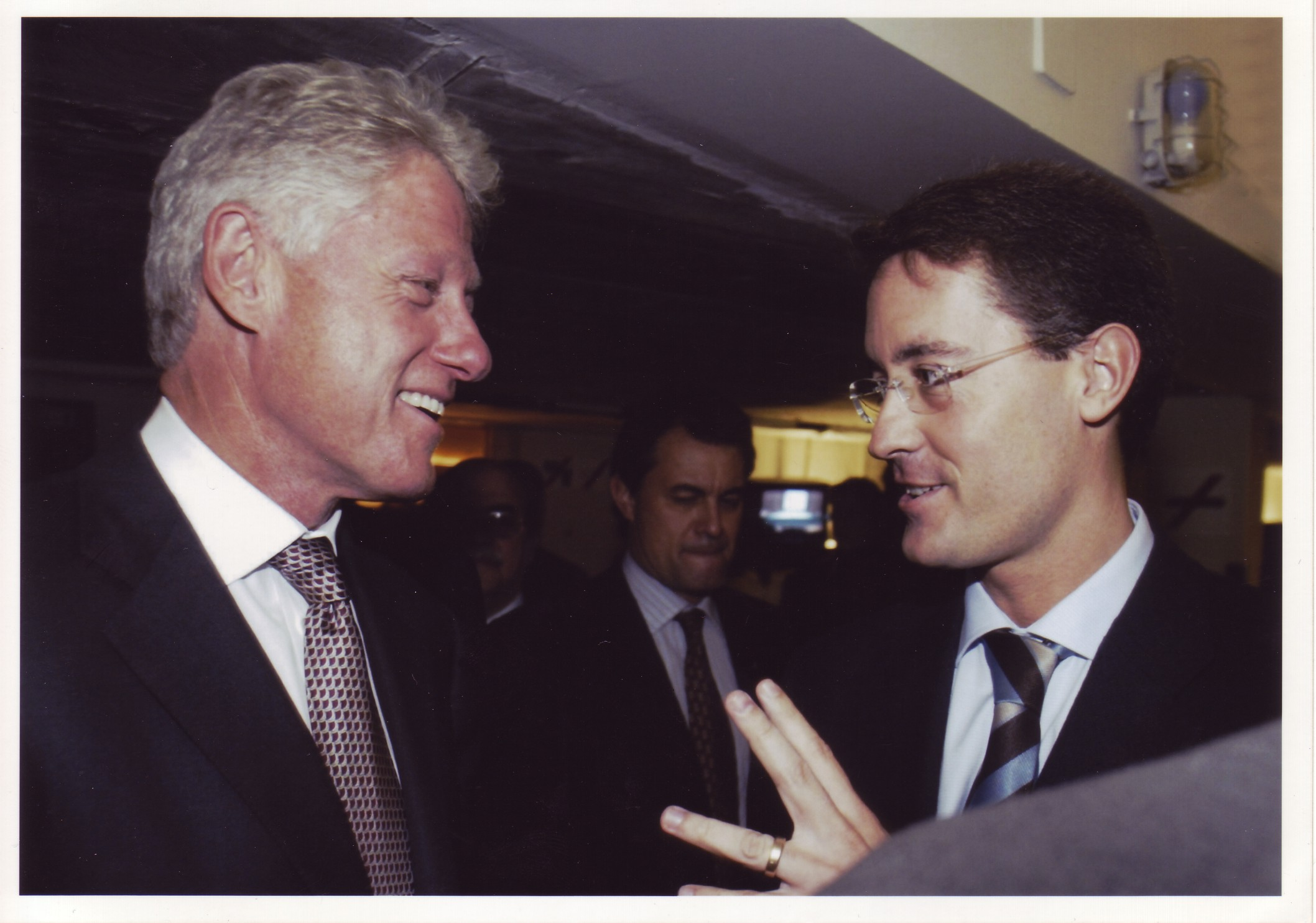
Bill Clinton and José Daniel Barquero.

Barquero Cabrero started his professional career in the United States in 1988 in Boston, New York City and Washington, D.C. He worked with Edward Bernays in the creation and development of several public relations, propaganda, and political marketing campaigns.

In 1991, Barquero began collaboration with British organizations alongside public relations expert Sam Black. They worked on public relations campaigns in both the United Kingdom and Spain. Barquero then opened a consultancy, Barquero, Huertas & Llauder Associates, working for businesses, and economic, political, cultural and human rights associations and institutions.

== Academic career ==
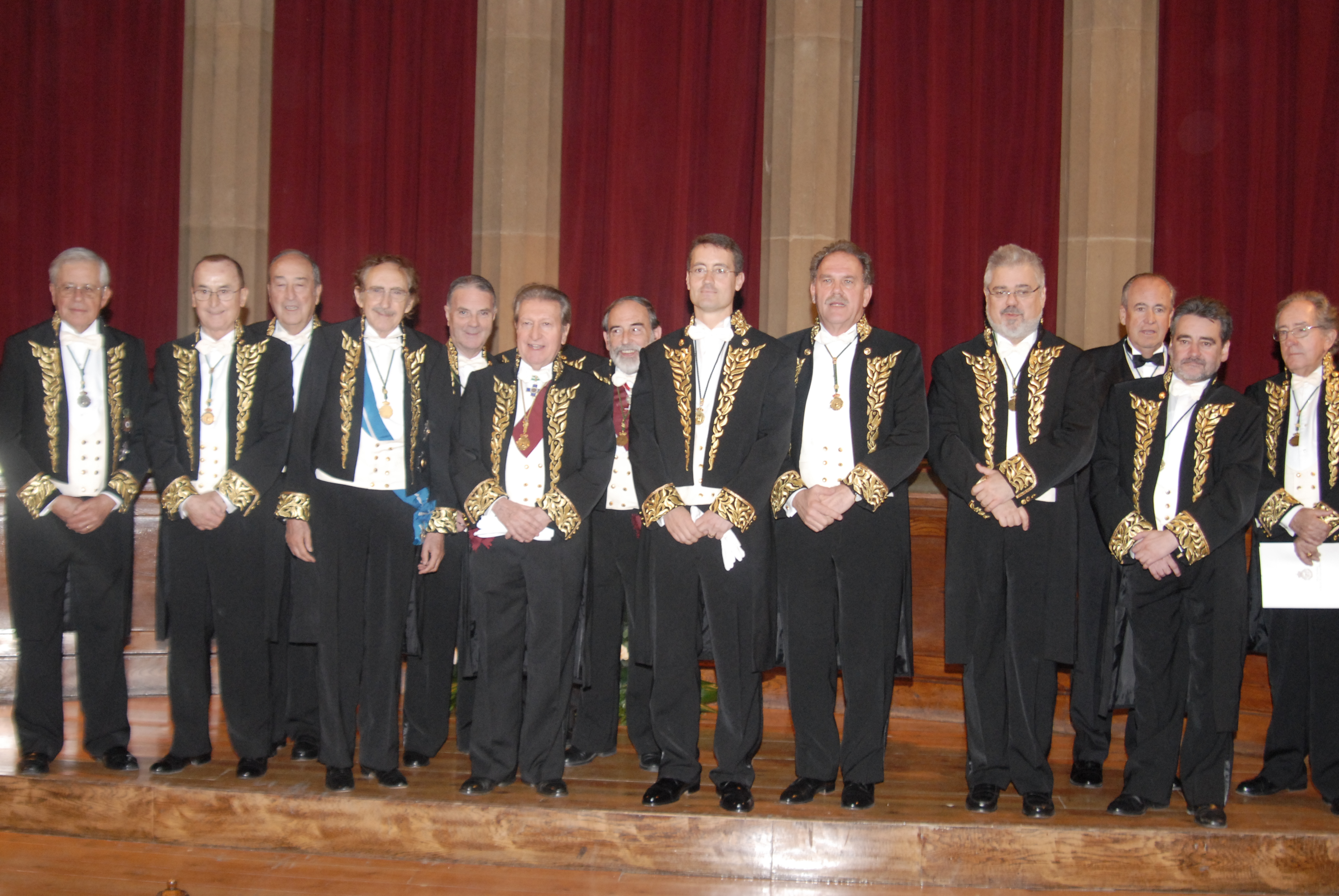
Dr Barquero Academic at the Royal Academy of Economic and Financial Sciences.

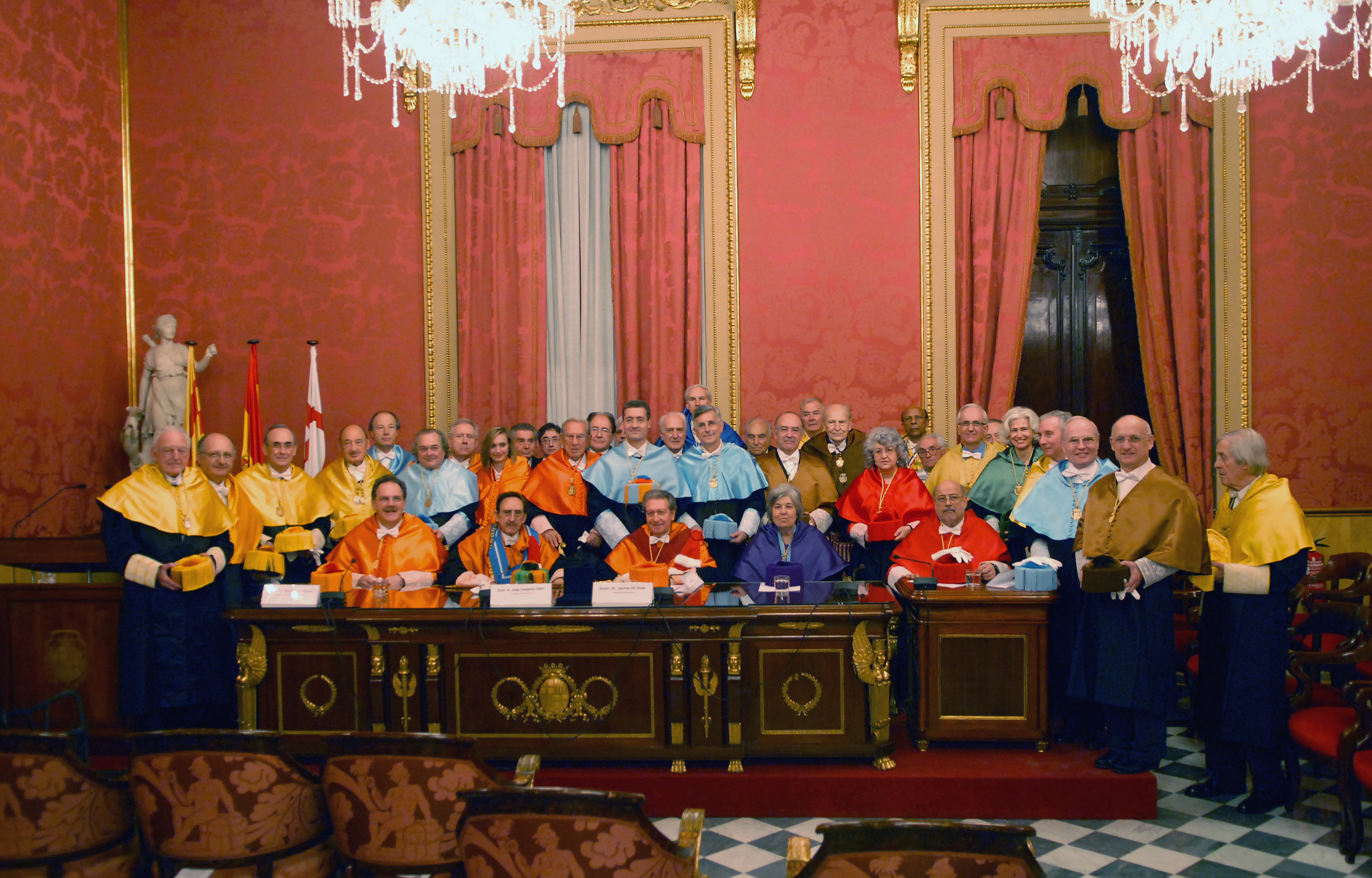
Dr Barquero Academic at the Royal European Academy of Doctors.

He obtained his PhD at the International University of Catalonia, with the research thesis: How to avoid the clash of cultures and civilizations – Multicultural Public Relations to obtain the alliance of civilizations, a thesis that was published by Spanish Editorial Libertarias ISBN 978-84-7954-591-8 and in English by Staffordshire University in the United Kingdom, ISBN 978-84-935828-6-9. Barquero also has several other degrees and academic honors, including an Executive MBA from the University of Barcelona, Expert in International Public Relations from the Universidad Complutense de Madrid, a Bachelor's degree in Advertising and Public Relations and a Bachelor's degree in Business from the University of Barcelona.

Barquero is an Academic at both the Royal Academy of Economic and Financial Sciences (RACEF) as well as the Royal European Academy of Doctors (RAED).

== Faculty membership ==
- Spain
  - University of Barcelona
  - Autonomous University of Barcelona
  - University Ramón Llull
  - Complutense University of Madrid
- United Kingdom
  - Staffordshire University
  - Queen's University Belfast
- Chile
  - Diego Portales University
  - University San Andrés
  - University Francisco de Aguirre
- Russia
  - Moscow State University of Technologies and Management

== International awards ==
Barquero Cabrero has been awarded with Honoris Causa PhD by Staffordshire University, Zhejiang University, Moscow State University, Universidad Interamericana, Universidad de San Andrés and by the Francisco de Aguirre University.

== Published works ==
Barquero Cabrero has published books in the field of public relations. Translations have been conducted by publishing houses Staffordshire University, Dielo and Porto Editora, translating his works to English, Russian and Portuguese. He has overseen the direction and coordination of book collections including Public Relations Classics and Collection of the Master in Public Relations and Communication in Organizations IL3-University of Barcelona.

Newspapers Expansión and Cinco Días have published investigations conducted by Barquero Cabrero in the fields of political marketing, public relations and communication within their management collections.

He has published more than 50 research articles in the areas of management, business and public relations, published by editorial groups such as "Expansión", "Buenaval" scientific journal, the Journal of the Colegio Oficial de Titulados Mercantiles y Empresariales de Barcelona, International Public Relations magazine, etc.

Barquero Cabrero was an author or co-author for:

- The Blue Book of Protocol and Public Relations (2004) ISBN 9788448141585
- Pocket Watch Encyclopedia (2004) ISBN 9788497351898
- Strategic Communication (2005) ISBN 9788448198886
- Customer Marketing (2007) ISBN 9788448156145
- Guaranteed Keys for the Growth and Consolidation of Companies (2009) ISBN 9788493656140
- Global Economy (2009) ISBN 9788493656164
- Leadership and Reputation (2010) ISBN 9788492956050
- Speeches on Economic and Social Sciences at the Royal Academy (2015) ISBN 9788494368059
- Pablo Neruda (2017) ISBN 9788494612084
- Communicating in the 21st century (2021) ISBN 9788418534379
- Social Sciences (2022) ISBN 9788411243155
- The Golden Book of Public Relations (2023) ISBN 9789720060402
- Public Relations Theoretical and Practical Framework ISBN 9788493839697

== Current positions ==
- President of the European Superior Council of Doctors and Honoris Causa Doctors
- General Director of ESERP Business School
- Chairman Barquero, Huertas & Llauder Associates
- Director at the Institute for Long Life Learning IL3-University of Barcelona for the Master in Public Relations for Organizations
- Affiliate of the University of Barcelona's Research Institute's research group on "Risk in Insurance and Finance"
