= Cabreros del Monte =

Coordinates: 41°51′N 5°16′W

Cabreros del Monte, Spain
- Coat of arms

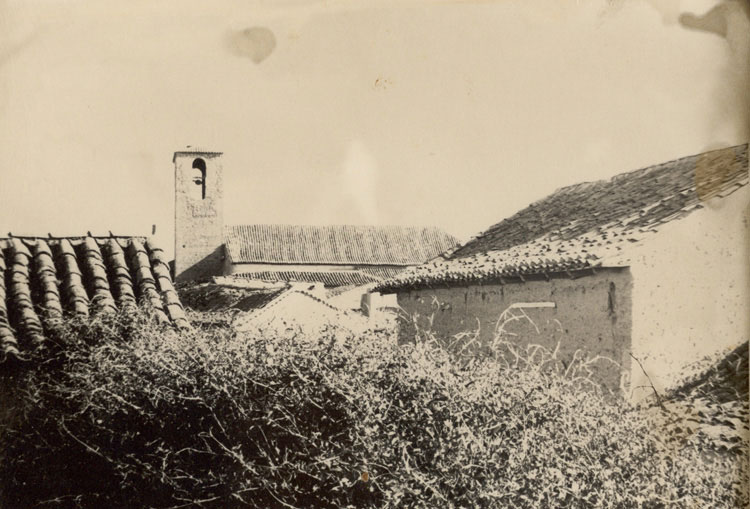
- Country: Spain
- Autonomous community: Castile and León
- Province: Valladolid
- Municipality: Cabreros del Monte

Area
  - Total: 28 km^{2} (11 sq mi)

Population (2025-01-01)
  - Total: 64
  - Density: 2.3/km^{2} (5.9/sq mi)
- Time zone: UTC+1 (CET)
  - Summer (DST): UTC+2 (CEST)

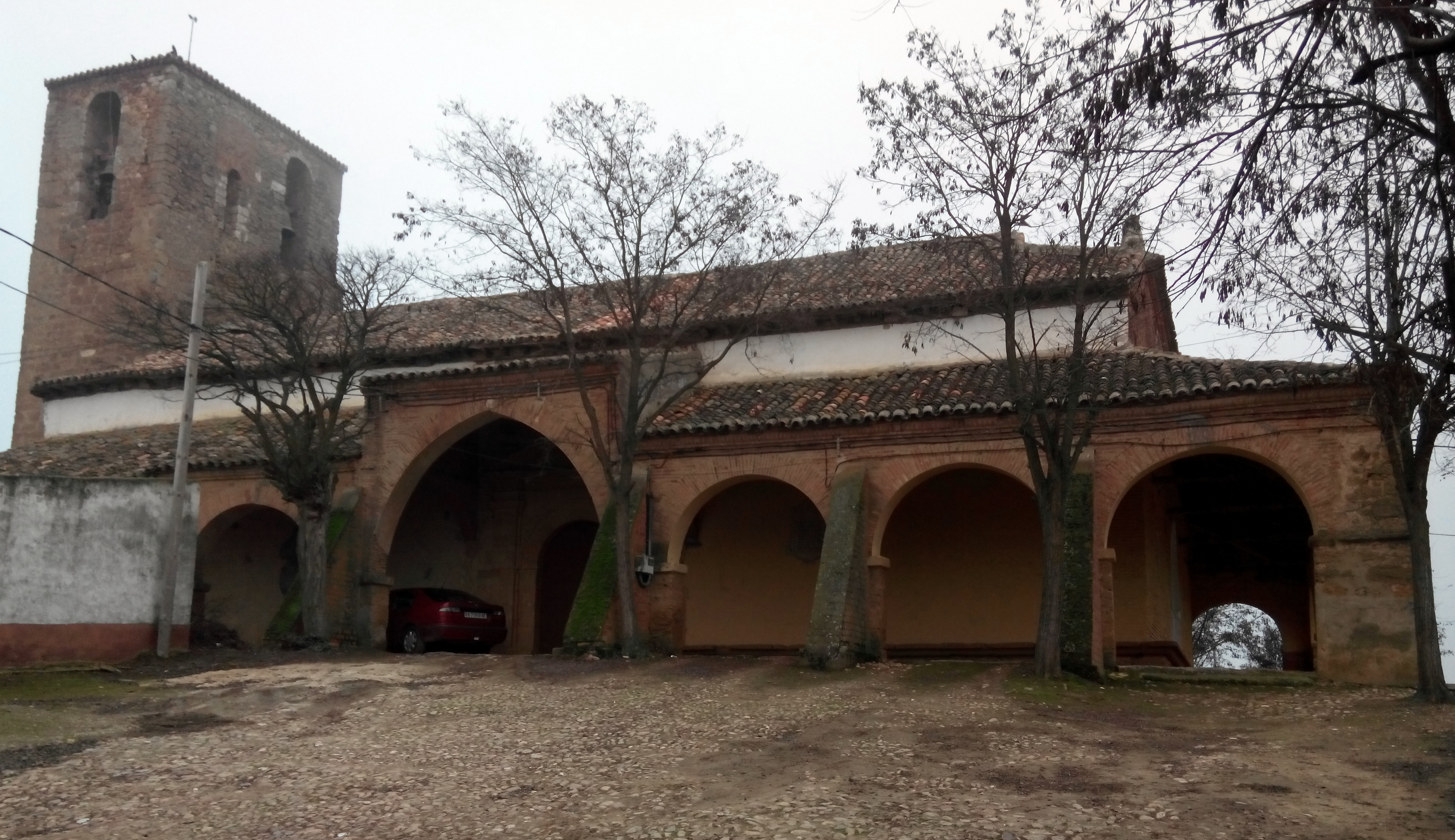
Church of San Juan Bautista

Cabreros del Monte is a municipality located in the province of Valladolid, Castile and León, Spain. According to the 2025 census (INE), the municipality has a population of 64 inhabitants.

== Demography ==
According to the 2004 census (INE), the municipality has a population of 84 inhabitants.
