= Prostitution in Bolivia =

Prostitution in Bolivia is legal and regulated. It is only permitted by registered prostitutes in licensed brothels. Prostitutes must register and must undergo regular health checks for sexually transmitted diseases (every 20 days). The police are allowed to check whether the prostitutes are registered or not, and have attended a clinic during the previous 20 days.

In 2016 UNAIDS estimated there were 30,523 prostitutes in Bolivia.

== Societal views ==
Although prostitution is widespread in Bolivia, the prostitutes are severely stigmatized by society, they are blamed for everything from broken homes to the rising HIV-infection rate. In 2007, in El Alto, hundreds of prostitutes were attacked, forced to strip and beaten by angry locals; several brothels were burnt. Citizens demanded that brothels and bars be located at least 3,200 feet/960 metres away from schools. The municipal government responded by closing all brothels within 1,600 feet/ 480 metres of schools, but took no action against those who had attacked the prostitutes. "We are Bolivia's unloved," said Yuly Perez, vice-president of ONAEM, the Bolivian sex workers' union, "If we don't work, who's going to feed our kids?" Another representative from the sex worker organization said that: "People think the point of our organization is to expand prostitution in Bolivia. In fact, we want the opposite. Our ideal world is one free of the economic desperation that forces women into this business."

== Child prostitution ==
In Bolivia, the average age of entry into prostitution is 16. Child prostitution is a serious problem, particularly in urban areas and in the Chapare region. Most children forced into prostitution come from the lower social classes and from broken families. Only 12.6% of these children have any education, leaving them with few opportunities. As a result, many remain in the sex trade throughout adulthood, despite wanting to exit. Approximately one third of girls and adolescents in prostitution have between one and five children, mostly under the age of 5. Most child prostitutes work on the streets, inside brothels or inside bars and clubs.

There are different types of child prostitution, varying with the economic power of the client and the age of the child. Upper-class clients tend to seek older adolescents aged 16–17 (and young adult prostitutes aged 18–20). Many of these youth come from Eastern Bolivia and from outside of the country. This type of prostitution is organised by closed networks, and is subject to very few controls. In some cases, the sexual contact between these adolescents and their clients takes place at the client's house. Adolescents from all parts of the country prostitute themselves in local bars or pubs, mainly for middle-class clients. Street prostitution involves women and girls of all ages who typically enter the trade when they are between the ages of 12 and 15 years. Finally, there is a form of “hidden” prostitution, which can involve children as young as 8 years, often in exchange for drugs or some kind of treat or toy. During the day, these children stay in the street often working as street vendors, domestic servants or waitresses. At night they go to dance clubs or sell alcohol in the street. Clients of this type of prostitution are generally adults or adolescents with little money.

The problem of child prostitution is exacerbated by poorly enforced laws and by rare and ineffective police raids. However, recently, more efforts have been done to address this problem; in 2008, the police raided several brothels and rescued 215 children who were working there. The International Organization for Migration (IOM) and the NGOs Save the Children and Pro-Adolescente conducted public awareness campaigns on the trafficking of children. La Paz Department and the La Paz city government each operate a shelter for abused and exploited children.

== Sex trafficking ==
Economic and social problems create a climate which is favorable to human trafficking. Young Bolivian women and girls are trafficked from rural to urban areas for commercial sexual exploitation; women and children from the indigenous ethnic groups in the Altiplano region are at greater risk of being trafficked into prostitution. Faced with extreme poverty, many citizens become economic migrants, and some are victimized by traffickers and forced into prostitution, both inside and outside Bolivia.

The country is also a source for victims trafficked for sexual exploitation to Argentina, Chile, Brazil, Spain, and the United States. Weak controls along the borders exacerbate this problem.

In 2018 the United States Department of State Office to Monitor and Combat Trafficking in Persons downgraded Bolivia's rank from 'Tier 2 Watch List' to a 'Tier 3' country.
