= Torre Cabrera (Pozzallo) =

Tower in Pozzallo, Italy

- Turri Cabrera
- Pozzallo, Sicily, Italy
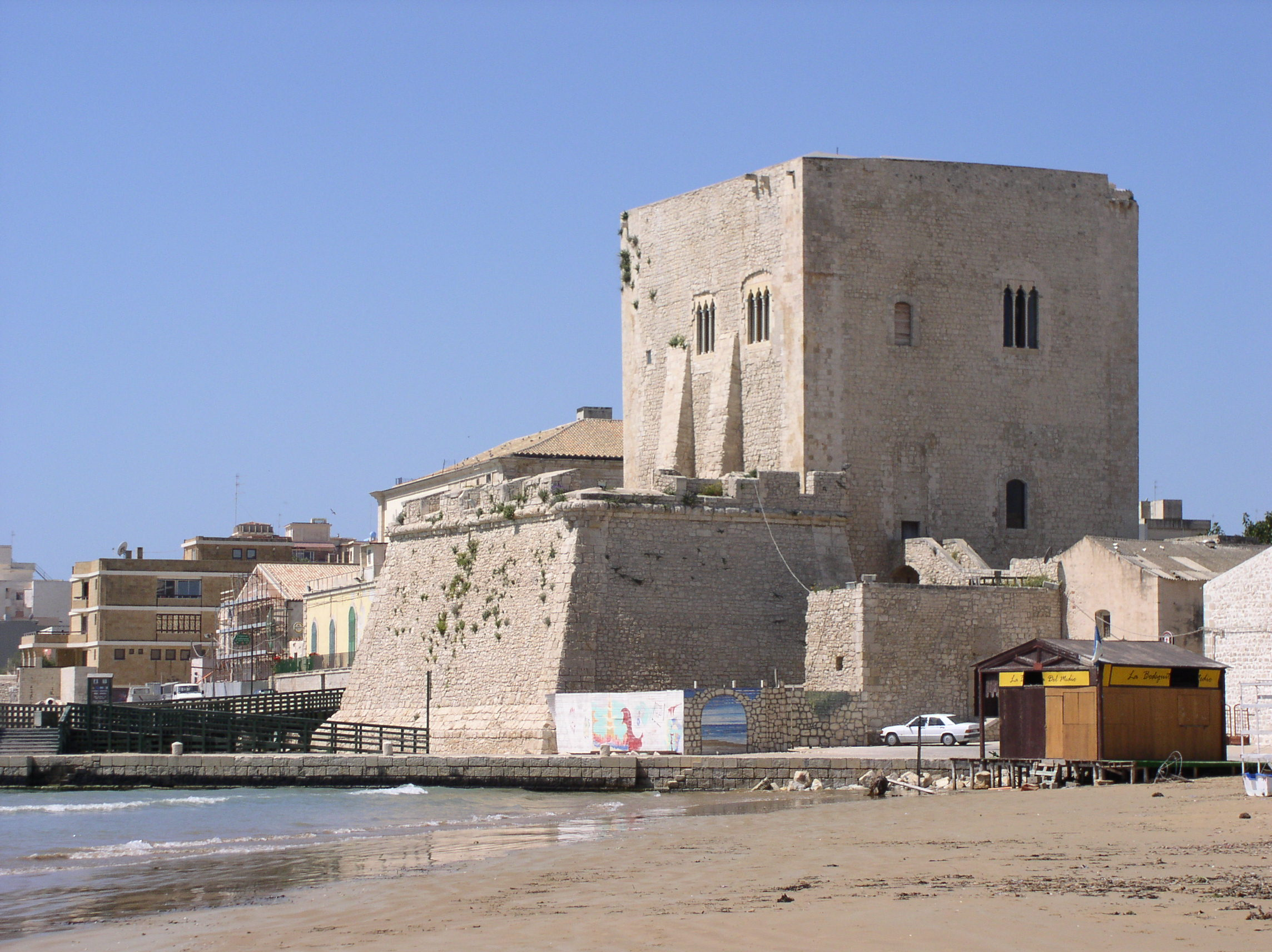
- View of Torre Cabrera

Site information
- Type: Tower
- Owner: Public
- Open to the public: Yes
- Condition: Intact

Location
- Coordinates: 36°43′39″N 14°50′54.6″E

Site history
- Built: 15th century
- Built by: County of Modica

The Torre Cabrera (Sicilian: Turri Cabrera) is an imposing "palacium" which combined the function of a noble residence with that of a control point for grain and goods, built in the 15th century. Today, it is in good condition and it is open to the public as a museum.

== History ==
In the 15th century, the site of Pozzallo had natural springs known as "Pozzofeto" and "Senia", which were marked on nautical charts and were well known among sailors. The "palacium" was built in the early fifteenth century in Sicilian Gothic style at the behest of the Count of Modica Giovanni Bernardo Cabrera, a member of one of the most illustrious Catalan families, the Viscounts Cabrera and Bas and the Counts of Osona, who supported and financed the Spanish sovereigns in reconquest of Sicily and received in exchange the county of Modica confiscated from the Chiaramonte rebels. It took its name from him “Torre di Cabrera”.

The tower became an impressive structure and it had great military importance, since it was used to defend Pozzallo from attacks by pirates. The tower was garrisoned by soldiers and gunners, and guns of different calibers were placed on its terraces. Captured pirates or other criminals were executed at the tower by being placed in a room on the rocks and being drowned by the high tide. On the main floor, characterized by imposing cross vaults, is the Count's residence, the sculpted coats of arms depicting the coat of arms of the noble Catalan Cabrera family stand out (House of Cabrera).

The village of Pozzallo first began to develop around the tower during the 18th century. It was initially a community of a few hundred people, including soldiers and fishermen, but it eventually grew to a town.

Today, the tower is in good condition, and it is now open to the public as the Museo della torre Cabrera. The building is a national monument, and it is depicted on the coat of arms of Pozzallo. Some of its windows have been rebuilt in their original style.

The Tower is a structure with a square plan, 20 meters on each side and 28 meters in height. It consists of three floors and a basement. The main floor is characterized by rooms with imposing Gothic ribbed vaults with carved keystones and elegant three-light windows. On the outside it preserves the sixteenth-century escarpment bastion, which juts out into the sea with the imposing terrace, equipped with the troniere for the maneuvering of the artillery pieces required by the needs of the defensive system of Sicily in the Mediterranean. The structure is very impressive, measuring 20 meters per side and 28 m high.
