= Cabrera, Santander =

Coordinates: 6°35′36″N 73°14′52″W

Cabrera
- Municipality and town
- Flag Coat of arms

- Location of the municipality and town of Cabrera in the Santander Department of Colombia.
- Country: Colombia
- Department: Santander Department
- Time zone: UTC-5 (Colombia Standard Time)

Cabrera is a town and municipality in the Santander Department in northeastern Colombia.
