= RedTraSex =

Latin American sex workers' organization

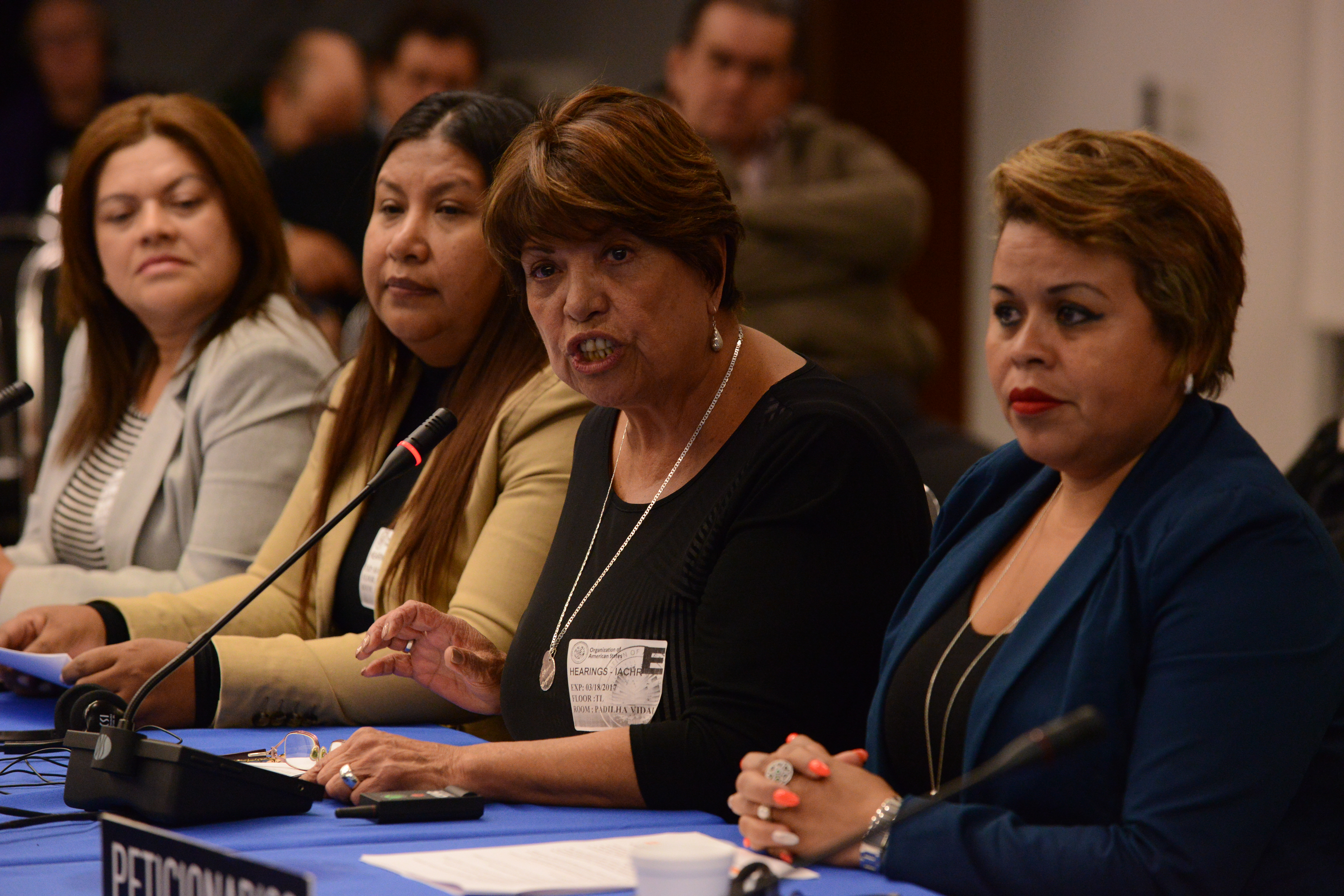
RedTraSex

La Red de Trabajadoras Sexuales de Latino América y el Caribe (RedTraSex) is a transnational network of female sex workers across 15 Latin American countries. The network was born at the "Una Sola Voz: Encuentro Latinoamericano de Trabajadores Sexuales" conference in October 1997 in Heredia, Costa Rica. The organization's central headquarters is currently located in Argentina and their Executive Secretary is Elena Eva Reynaga. Since its establishment, RedTraSex, aims to achieve nation state recognition for its members demanding that they be protected as legitimate workers and have access to adequate health services, work and social benefits.

The organization uses a feminist rights-based approach, to connect its members with programs addressing their needs. It aims to strengthen unity amongst its members through communication platforms, awareness campaigns, supporting community-based organizations, and publishing research on issues faced by sex workers. It is particularly significant for its transnational impact in the regions.

== Outreach campaigns ==
Feminist scholars Kate Hardy and Megan Rivers-Moore suggest that the current movement for sex worker unionization in Latin America is directly linked to RedTraSex. This transnational organization plays a crucial role in supporting and financing activist movements, and provides guidance to sex workers interested in forming unions. RedTraSex also organizes workshops on governance, human rights, gender, and self-esteem to help members gain international exposure, share ideas, identify commonalities, and work towards achieving autonomy in unionization. The organization has established four sex worker unions and is politically recognized by Colombia, Guatemala, Nicaragua and Peru.

RedTraSex campaigns for fair access to medical services for sex workers. It urges health ministries to offer discrimination-free services and promotes health protocols and prevention measures. In collaboration with Asociacion de Mujeres Meretrices de Argentina (AMMAR), RedTraSex played a key role in establishing "El Centro de Salud Sandra Cabrera" on September 13, 2006. The organization has attended several international conferences related to the HIV/AIDS epidemic. In 2007, members set up booths and presented their report "Un Movimiento de Tacones Altos: Mujeres Trabajadoras Sexuales y Activistas" at the Fourth Forum of HIV & AIDS in Buenos Aires, Argentina. At the World HIV Conference in Mexico in 2008, Elena Reygoza delivered a speech to raise awareness about the impact of insufficient health resources on the epidemic.

From 2012 to 2017, RedTraSex initiated the "El Sueño no Soñado de Objetos de Estudio a Sujetas de Acción" project, which was funded by Fondo Mundial. The goal of the project was to provide sex workers with work equipment that would enable them to conduct investigations, research, and data collection. As a result, the project created a map of sex work policies and legislation, which empowered sex workers to serve as judicial facilitators and address police violence in their regions. Additionally, the organization offers informative training sessions for police cohorts to raise awareness about the infringement of rights and abuse of power that sex workers often face.

In 2019, RedTraSex launched “Biblioteca Virtual Sobre Trabajo Sexual Sandra Cabrera”, the first virtual library compiled by reports, reflections and informative bulletins about and by sex workers. The archives available are made in collaboration with ONUSIDA, United Nations and Amnesty International. During the COVID-19 pandemic, RedTraSex partnered with Amnesty International to demand discrimination-free health services and social security benefits. They also communicated directly with governments in Latin America and the Caribbean to prevent the violation of human rights.

RedTraSex actively works towards addressing the censoring and violation of expression that sex worker organizations' face on their social media platforms. The organization participated in the 2011 Human Rights Moderation of Internet Content and Freedom of Expression hearing in North and South America to raise awareness on censorship and silencing sex worker organizations platforms face. RedTraSex experienced a violation of expression when their Instagram account was disabled and later banned on June 3, 2021. Their account was removed for over two months without any explanation.

== Organizations ==
- Argentina - Asociación de Mujeres Meretrices de la Argentina (AMMAR)
- Brasil - Red de Brasilia de Prostituas
- Bolivia - La Organización Nacional de Activistas por la Emancipación de la Mujer (ONAEM)
- Chile - Sindicato Nacional Independiente de Trabajadoras Angela Lina
- Costa Rica - Asociación La Sala
- Ecuador - RedTrabSex
- El Salvador - Movimiento de Mujeres Orquídeas
- Guatemala - Organización de Mujeres en Superación (OMES)
- Honduras - Red Gestora de Mujeres
- Mexico - Asociacion en PRO Apoyo a Servidores (APROASE A.C)
- Nicaragua - GIRASOLES
- Paraguay - Unidas en la Esperanza
- Peru - Asociacion de Trabajadores Sexuales Miluska Vida y Dignidad
- Republica Dominicana - Movimiento de Mujeres Unidas (MODEMU)
- Uruguay - Asociación de Meretrices Profesionales del Uruguay (AMEPU)
