= Beto Cabrera =

Argentine comedian and actor (1933–2026)

Alberto Pedro Cabrera
- Born: 24 November 1933; Buenos Aires, Argentina
- Died: 30 July 2026 (aged 92); Spain

Alberto Pedro "Beto" Cabrera (24 November 1933 – 30 July 2026) was an Argentine comedian, actor, impersonator and singer. He was best known for having been one half of the comedy duo Dúo de Dos, along with fellow Argentine Mario Sánchez, throughout the 1960s and 1970s; the two featured on television shows such as Sábados circulares and El paquete del Dúo (1969–1970). Cabrera was also active in Peruvian television, and spent the last years of his life in Spain.

== Background ==
Alberto Pedro Cabrera was born in Buenos Aires, Argentina on 24 November 1933. He joined the Argentine Air Force; as of 1966, he had attained the rank of suboficial ayudante.

In the later years of his life, Cabrera dealt with anemia. He died in Spain on 30 July 2026, at the age of 92.

== Career ==
Cabrera started his career in entertainment on radio, doing sketches and impersonations on La revista dislocada. He was working in accounting at the Argentine Air Force at the time, and would spend his evenings working on the show. He began working in television and film during this time, and in 1965 was in Disloque en el presidio.

In 1966, while on La revista dislocada, he was introduced by mutual acquaintances to fellow part-time entertainer and suboficial auxiliar in the Air Force, Mario Sánchez, who also appeared on the radio show. Cabrera initially had Sánchez play guitar for him during performances, but, after Cabrera lost his voice one day and Sánchez filled in for him, began working with him as a duo. They named themselves Dúo de Dos, and became one of the most successful comedy duos in Argentina, popular on radio, television, and in the theatre. They remained active as a duo throughout the 1960s and 1970s on shows such as Sábados circulares; from 1969 to 1970, they had their own comedy show on Teleonce, El paquete del Dúo, which aired on Saturday and became popular on the network.

After the duo's end, Sánchez and Cabrera both remained active in the entertainment industry; Sánchez remained in Argentina until his death in 2007. Cabrera took roles in Peru and, eventually, settled in Spain for the last few decades of his life. He was known in both Spain and Argentina, and best known for his role in Dúo de Dos.

== Film and radio ==
=== Filmography ===
- Disloque en el presidio (1965)
- Domingos de mi ciudad
- Domingos 69
- La baranda
- Sábados circulares
- El paquete del Dúo (1969–1970)
- Telecómicos

=== Radio ===
- La revista dislocada
