= Ramón Cabrero =

Spanish footballer and manager

Personal information
- Full name: Ramón Cabrero Muñíz
- Date of birth: 7 November 1947
- Place of birth: Santander, Cantabria, Spain
- Date of death: 1 November 2017 (aged 69)
- Height: 1.65 m (5 ft 5 in)
- Position: Midfielder

Senior career*
Years	Team	Apps	(Gls)
1965–1968	Lanús	92	(6)
1969	Newell's Old Boys	13	(1)
1970–1974	Atlético Madrid	4	(0)
1974–1976	Elche	11	(0)
1976	Mallorca		
1976–1978	San Martín MDZ		
1979–1982	Independiente Rivadavia		

Managerial career
- 1985–1987: Deportivo Italiano
- 1987–1988: Lanús
- 1988–1989: Deportivo Maipú
- 1989–1990: Central Córdoba (SdE)
- 1990–1991: Colón Santa Fe
- 2005: Dinamo Tirana
- 2005–2008: Lanús
- 2009–2010: Atlético Nacional
- * Club domestic league appearances and goals as of 10:28, 17 May 2009 (UTC)

Ramón Cabrero Muñíz (Santander, Cantabria 7 November 1947 – 1 November 2017) was a Spanish footballer. He was the manager of Atlético Nacional in Colombia until April 5, 2010. Cabrero is widely considered one of the greatest idols and a symbol of Lanús.

Cabrero was born in the Spanish city of Santander, but when he was 4 years old he moved to Argentina.

== Playing career ==
Cabrero played 5 years with Lanús before joining Newell's Old Boys. He then played for three clubs in Spain; Atlético Madrid, Elche CF and Mallorca. He returned to Argentina and played in Mendoza with Independiente Rivadavia and San Martín.

== Managerial career ==
Cabrero's first success as a manager came when he led Deportivo Italiano into the Primera División Argentina by winning the Primera B Nacional in 1986. He then had spells in charge of Deportivo Maipú, Central Córdoba (SdE) and Colón de Santa Fe.

Cabrero then had several years as a youth team coach with Racing Club and Lanús.

Cabrero returned to first team management with Albanian side Dinamo Tirana in 2005 but was sacked for failing to reach the 2nd round of the Intertoto Cup. He then took over as coach of Lanús in 2005.

In 2007 Cabrero led Lanús to their first ever top flight league championship; the Primera División Argentina Apertura 2007.

In May, 2009, Cabrero became manager of Atletico Nacional, from Medellin, Colombia.

=== Managerial titles ===
Season	Team	Title
Apertura 1986	Sportivo Italiano	Primera B Nacional
Apertura 2007	Lanús	Primera División Argentina
