= Argentine Workers' Central Union =

Trade union in Argentina

- Central de Trabajadores de la Argentina
- Abbreviation: CTA
- Founded: 1991
- Headquarters: Buenos Aires, Argentina
- Location: Argentina
- Key people: Hugo Yasky, General Secretary (Workers) Hugo Godoy, General Secretary(Autonomous)
- Affiliations: ITUC
- Website: www.cta.org.ar

The Argentine Workers' Central Union (Spanish: Central de Trabajadores de la Argentina, CTA) is a trade-union federation in Argentina. Its general secretary is Hugo Yasky. It was formed in 1991 when a number of trade unions disaffiliated from the General Confederation of Labour.

Though the CTA is a left-wing-tendency organization, it is led by unionists with a kirchnerist viewpoint. There are also peronist, communist and trotskyist minorities.

== History ==
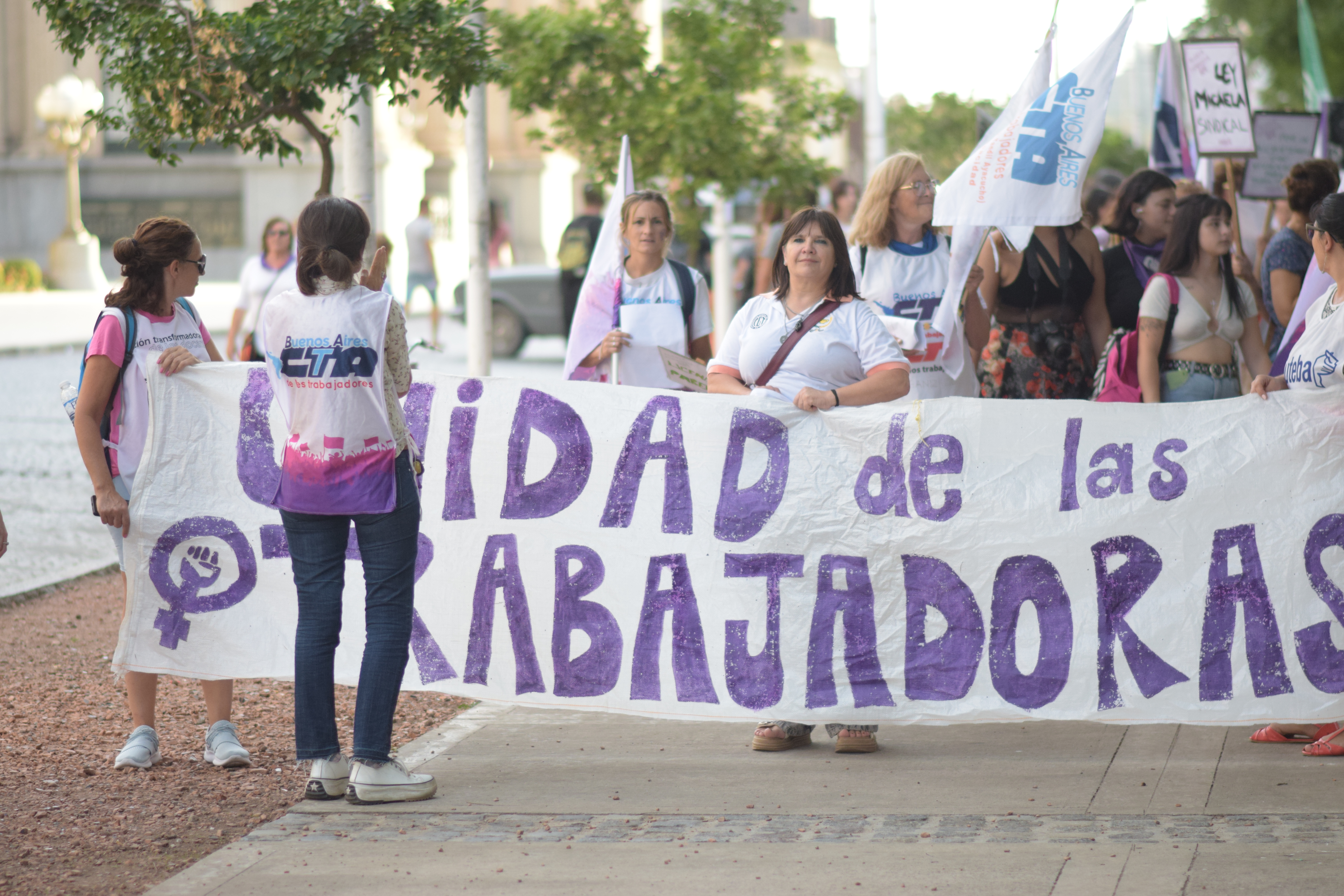
Members of CTA in manifestation of #8M 2023 in Tandil, Argentina.

The most important union confederation that inhabits the CTA is that of the CTERA teachers. The Workers' CTA is aligned with Kirchnerism and its leader is the teacher Hugo Yasky.

CTA was born in 1992 to confront the trade unionism that was aligned with the Menemism around the CGT, the Peronist labor union.

Its main founders were two unions (the state unions of ATE and the teachers of CTERA) that at that time showed more disagreement with the dialogue and support position that the majority of the Peronist unionists took.

Later, the CTA ended up being divided into two slopes, the Workers' CTA and the Autonomous CTA. The most numerous is that of the Workers, who always supported Cristina Kirchner and in which her most powerful base union is the SUTEBA, led by teacher Roberto Baradel.
