= Prostitution by region =

This is an overview of prostitution by region.

== Africa ==
Decriminalization - no criminal penalties for prostitution Legalization - prostitution legal and regulated Abolitionism - prostitution is legal, but organized activities such as brothels and pimping are illegal; prostitution is not regulated Neo-abolitionism - illegal to buy sex and for 3rd party involvement, legal to sell sex Prohibitionism - prostitution illegal Legality varies with local laws

Prostitution is illegal in the majority of African countries. HIV/AIDS infection rates are particularly high among African sex workers.

Nevertheless, it is common, driven by the widespread poverty in many sub-Saharan African countries, and is one of the drivers for the prevalence of HIV/AIDS in Africa. Social breakdown and poverty caused by civil war in several African countries has caused further increases in the rate of prostitution in those countries. For these reasons, some African countries have also become destinations for sex tourism.

Long-distance truck drivers have been identified as a group with the high-risk behaviour of sleeping with prostitutes and a tendency to spread the infection along trade routes in the region. Infection rates of up to 33% were observed in this group in the late 1980s in Uganda, Kenya and Tanzania.

Prostitution in African areas
Sovereign states
- Algeria - Angola - Benin - Botswana - Burkina Faso - Burundi - Cameroon - Cape Verde - Central African Republic - Chad - Comoros - Democratic Republic of the Congo - Republic of the Congo - Djibouti - Egypt - Equatorial Guinea - Eritrea - Ethiopia - Eswatini - Gabon - The Gambia - Ghana - Guinea - Guinea-Bissau - Ivory Coast - Kenya - Lesotho - Liberia - Libya - Madagascar - Malawi - Mali - Mauritania - Mauritius - Morocco - Mozambique - Namibia - Niger - Nigeria - Rwanda - São Tomé and Príncipe - Senegal - Seychelles - Sierra Leone - Somalia - South Africa - South Sudan - Sudan - Tanzania - Togo - Tunisia - Uganda - Zambia - Zimbabwe

States with limited recognition

- Sahrawi Arab Democratic Republic - Somaliland

Dependencies and other territories

- Ascension Island - Canary Islands - Ceuta - Madeira - Mayotte - Melilla - Réunion - Saint Helena - Tristan da Cunha - Western Sahara

== Americas ==
Legal status of prostitution in North America

Legal status of prostitution in Central America and the Caribbean

Legal status of prostitution in South America

Decriminalization - No criminal penalties for prostitution
Legalization - prostitution legal and regulated
Abolitionism - prostitution is legal, but organized activities such as brothels and pimping are illegal; prostitution is not regulated
Neo-abolitionism - illegal to buy sex and for 3rd party involvement, legal to sell sex
Prohibitionism - prostitution illegal
Legality varies with local laws

Legality of prostitution in the Americas varies by country, and can even vary by area within the same country. The level of enforcement also varies.

Prostitution in North American areas
Sovereign states
- Canada - United States - Mexico

Dependencies and other territories

- Bermuda - Greenland - Saint Pierre and Miquelon

Prostitution in Central American areas
Sovereign states
- Belize - Costa Rica - El Salvador - Guatemala - Honduras - Nicaragua - Panama

Prostitution in Caribbean areas
Sovereign states
- Antigua and Barbuda - Bahamas - Barbados - Cuba - Dominica - Dominican Republic - Grenada - Haiti - Jamaica - Saint Kitts and Nevis - Saint Lucia - Saint Vincent and the Grenadines - Trinidad and Tobago

Dependencies and other territories

- Anguilla - Aruba - Bonaire - British Virgin Islands - Cayman Islands - Curaçao - Guadeloupe - Martinique - Montserrat - Puerto Rico - Saba - Saint Barthélemy - Saint Martin - Saint Pierre and Miquelon - Sint Eustatius - Sint Maarten - Turks and Caicos Islands - United States Virgin Islands

Prostitution in South American areas
Sovereign states
- Argentina - Bolivia - Brazil - Chile - Colombia - Ecuador - Guyana - Paraguay - Peru - Suriname - Uruguay - Venezuela

Dependencies and other territories

- Falkland Islands - French Guiana - South Georgia and the South Sandwich Islands

== Asia ==
Decriminalization - no criminal penalties for prostitution Legalization - prostitution legal and regulated Abolitionism - prostitution is legal, but organized activities such as brothels and pimping are illegal; prostitution is not regulated Neo-abolitionism - illegal to buy sex and for 3rd party involvement, legal to sell sex Prohibitionism - prostitution illegal Legality varies with local laws

In Asia, the main characteristic of the region is the very big discrepancy between the laws which exist on the books and what occurs in practice. For example, in Thailand prostitution is illegal, but in practice it is tolerated and partly regulated, and the country is a destination for sex tourism. Such situations are common in many Asian countries.

In Japan, prostitution is illegal with the exception of heterosexual, vaginal intercourse. Advertisements that detail what each individual prostitute will do (oral sex, anal sex, etc.) are a common sight in the country, although many prostitutes disregard the law.

In India, prostitution is legal only if carried out in the private residence of a prostitute or others.

Prostitution in Asian areas
Sovereign states
- Afghanistan - Armenia - Azerbaijan - Bahrain - Bangladesh - Bhutan - Brunei - Cambodia - China - Cyprus - Egypt - Georgia - India - Indonesia - Iran - Iraq - Israel - Japan - Jordan - Kazakhstan - North Korea - South Korea - Kuwait - Kyrgyzstan - Laos - Lebanon - Malaysia - Maldives - Mongolia - Myanmar - Nepal - Oman - Pakistan - Philippines - Qatar - Russia - Saudi Arabia - Singapore - Sri Lanka - Syria - Tajikistan - Thailand - Timor-Leste - Turkey - Turkmenistan - United Arab Emirates - Uzbekistan - Vietnam - Yemen

States with limited recognition

- Abkhazia - Artsakh - Northern Cyprus - Palestine - South Ossetia - Taiwan

Dependencies and other territories

- British Indian Ocean Territory - Christmas Island - Cocos (Keeling) Islands - Hong Kong - Macau

== Europe ==
Decriminalization - no criminal penalties for prostitution Legalization - prostitution legal and regulated Abolitionism - prostitution is legal, but organized activities such as brothels and pimping are illegal; prostitution is not regulated Neo-abolitionism - illegal to buy sex and for 3rd party involvement, legal to sell sex Prohibitionism - prostitution illegal Legality varies with local laws

Compared to other continents, Europe has very diverse laws when it comes to prostitution. The most common legal system in the European Union is that which allows prostitution itself (the exchange of sex for money) but prohibits associated activities (brothels, pimping, etc.). Prostitution remains illegal in most of the ex-communist countries of Eastern Europe.

In Belgium, sex work has been decriminalized since 1 June 2022. It is the first country in Europe to decriminalize sex work.

In Sweden, Northern Ireland, Norway, Iceland, and France it is illegal to pay for sex (the client commits a crime, but not the prostitute).

In the United Kingdom, it is illegal to pay for sex with a prostitute who has been "subjected to force" and this is a strict liability offense (clients can be prosecuted even if they did not know the prostitute was forced), but prostitution itself is legal.

In Germany prostitution is legal, as are brothels.

In Finland, Norway and Switzerland the right to sell sex is restricted based on citizenship. Illegal immigrants caught selling sex in Finland or Norway may be deported and of foreign citizens only EU citizens can get a Swiss prostitution license.

The enforcement of the anti-prostitution laws varies by country.

In Eastern Europe, prostitution was outlawed by the former communist regimes, and most of those countries chose to keep it illegal even after the fall of the Communists. It was only legalized by the former communist countries that joined the European Union (except for Lithuania and Croatia, where it remains illegal). It is even regulated in Hungary and Latvia.

Lithuania and Croatia remain the only countries in the European Union where a person providing sexual services is punished. Croatia is the only one in which only a sex worker is criminalized, because Lithuania also criminalizes clients. In Sweden, France and Ireland only clients are punished, while in other countries both the sale and purchase of sexual services is legal.

Prostitution in European areas
Sovereign states
- Albania - Andorra - Armenia - Austria - Azerbaijan - Belarus - Belgium - Bosnia and Herzegovina - Bulgaria - Croatia - Cyprus - Czech Republic - Denmark - Estonia - Finland - France - Georgia - Germany - Greece - Hungary - Iceland - Ireland - Italy - Kosovo - Latvia - Liechtenstein - Lithuania - Luxembourg - Malta - Moldova - Monaco - Montenegro - Netherlands - North Macedonia - Norway - Poland - Portugal - Romania - Russia - San Marino - Serbia - Slovakia - Slovenia - Spain - Sweden - Switzerland - Turkey - Ukraine - United Kingdom - Vatican City

States with limited recognition

- Abkhazia - Artsakh - Northern Cyprus - South Ossetia - Transnistria

Dependencies and other territories

- Åland - Faroe Islands - Gibraltar - Guernsey - Isle of Man - Jersey - Svalbard

== Oceania ==
Decriminalization - no criminal penalties for prostitution Legalization - prostitution legal and regulated Abolitionism - prostitution is legal, but organized activities such as brothels and pimping are illegal; prostitution is not regulated Neo-abolitionism - illegal to buy sex and for 3rd party involvement, legal to sell sex Prohibitionism - prostitution illegal Legality varies with local laws

Prostitution in Oceania varies greatly across the region. In American Samoa, prostitution is illegal, whereas in New Zealand most aspects of the trade are legal.

Prostitution in Oceania areas
Sovereign states
- Australia - Federated States of Micronesia - Fiji - Kiribati - Marshall Islands - Nauru - New Zealand - Palau - Papua New Guinea - Samoa - Solomon Islands - Tonga - Tuvalu - Vanuatu

Associated states of New Zealand

- Cook Islands - Niue

Dependencies and other territories

- American Samoa - Christmas Island - Cocos (Keeling) Islands - Easter Island - French Polynesia - Guam - Hawaii - New Caledonia - Norfolk Island - Northern Mariana Islands - Pitcairn Islands - Tokelau - Wallis and Futuna

== See also ==
- Prostitution statistics by country
