= Le Mirage =

Le Mirage may refer to:

- Le Mirage (brothel), an open-air brothel in Curaçao
- Le Mirage, a 1909 film directed by Louis Feuillade
- Le Mirage, a 1912 film directed by Victorin-Hippolyte Jasset
- Le Mirage, a 1992 film directed by Jean-Claude Guiguet
- Le Mirage (2015 film), a Canadian film directed by Ricardo Trogi
