= Prostitution in Armenia =

Prostitution in Armenia is illegal under administrative law (Article 179.1). Related activities such as running a brothel and pimping are prohibited by the Criminal Code, although there are known to be brothels in the capital, Yerevan, and in Gyumri. According to UNESCO, since the collapse of the Soviet Union in 1991, prostitution in the country has grown. There are about 5,600 women involved in prostitution in Armenia, roughly 1,500 of them are in Yerevan. However, official police figures are far lower, for example 240 in 2012. Police and other safety forces reportedly tolerate prostitution. Many women turn to prostitution due to unemployment.

Child prostitution is a problem in the country, but this is denied by the authorities. Sex trafficking is also a problem.

== History ==
At the start of the 20th century, prostitution in Armenia was legal and regulated. The main objective of the regulation was to control sexually transmitted infections.

Brothels could be opened by women over 35 years old. The brothel could not be within 150 sazhens (320 metres) of churches, schools, and other public places. The owner must live on the premises and not engage in prostitution herself. She could take a maximum of 3/4 of the prostitutes' earnings.

A former brothel in Teryan Street, Yerevan is still noticeable by its carved naked women on the facade.

During majority of the Soviet period, prostitution officially didn't exist. Prostitutes were sent to be "re-educated" in labour camps. It wasn't until 1987, that the Administrative Code included the prohibition of prostitution.

== Calls for legalisation ==
The head of Dermatology and Infectious Diseases Scientific-Medical Center, doctor-dermatologist Samvel Hovhannisyan, was quoted as saying in June 2015: "The legalisation of prostitution in Armenia may cause a reduction of a rate of sexually transmitted diseases to 60%." He added that the "ancient profession" must be strictly controlled by the country.

In 2016, the Helsinki Citizens’ Assembly’s Vanadzor Office president, Artur Sakunts, called for prostitution to be legalised and regulated. He said the taxes paid by the sex workers would benefit the country, and that “Paid sex services should not be considered a punishable act; they should not be prosecuted not to be ever manageable at the hands of organized criminal groups which could make [sex workers] victims of internal trafficking.”

In the run-up to the 2017 Armenian parliamentary election, former prime minister, Hrant Bagratyan, of the Free Democrats party said prostitution should be legalised and licensed, and taxation of their services would be positive towards the state's budget.

== Sex Trafficking ==
Human traffickers exploit domestic and foreign victims in Armenia, and traffickers exploit victims from Armenia abroad. Armenian women and children are subjected to sex trafficking in the UAE and Turkey. Armenian women and children are also subjected to sex trafficking within the country. Russian women working as dancers in nightclubs are vulnerable to sex trafficking.

The United States Department of State Office to Monitor and Combat Trafficking in Persons ranks Armenia as a 'Tier 2' country.

== See also ==
- Prostitution by region
- Prostitution in Europe
- Prostitution in the Soviet Union
- Prostitution statistics by country
- Right Side NGO
- Social issues in Armenia
