= Prostitution age of consent =

The prostitution age of consent is the minimum age at which a person may legally engage in prostitution. Where this is not specified in the individual county's prostitution laws, then the general age of consent laws for that country apply.

== Prostitution age of consent by country ==
Country	Prostitution age of consent	Client age of consent	Penalty for a violation	Note
Argentina	18			
Benin	16			
Bolivia	18			
Colombia	18		From 14 to 25 years if prostitute is under 18;	
Cuba	16			
Czech Republic	18			
Denmark	18			
Democratic Republic of the Congo	18			
Ecuador	18			
El Salvador	18			
Ethiopia	18			
Germany	18		Up to 5 years or fine if prostitute is under 18; From 2 to 15 years if prostitute is under 14;	
Greece	18			
Guinea-Bissau	14			Prostitution of children is not specifically prohibited, however the minimum labor age (14) applies.
Honduras	18			
Hong Kong	21		A fine of $10,000 and imprisonment for 6 months	
Hungary	18			
Lebanon	21			
Mexico (in states where prostitution is legal)	18			
Netherlands	18 nationally, 21 in some municipalities	16		
New Zealand	18	16		
Nicaragua	18			
Paraguay	18			
Peru	18			
Senegal	21			
Singapore	18			
Tunisia	18			
Tuvalu	15			
United Kingdom	18	16		
United States (Nevada only)	18			
Uruguay	18			
Venezuela	18			

== See also ==
- Prostitution law
- Prostitution by region
