= Prostitution in Cyprus =

Prostitution in Cyprus is not illegal, but operating brothels, organising prostitution rings, living off the profits of prostitution, encouraging prostitution or forcing a person to engage in prostitution are illegal activities.

In 2015, MP Rikkos Mappourides called for prostitution in Cyprus to be legalised.

== History ==
The ancient Greek goddess of love, Aphrodite, was reputed to have been born near Paphos, and a temple was built on the site. From the 5th century BC sacred prostitution took place at the temple. Every woman in the land was expected to make a journey to the temple once in her lifetime and have sex in exchange for money in the temple grounds.

Following the island coming under control of the British, prostitutes were required to be registered. In the Larnaca Town Museum the 1916 registration book is on display, which contains photographs of the town's prostitutes. Brothels were outlawed by the Governor, Ronald Storrs, in 1931, but there were exceptions during World War II for the use of allied troops.

In an effort to reduce the spread of STIs, the Army Medical Corps introduced a card system for prostitutes. In 1941, 300 cards were issued. The prostitutes had to have a daily health check, and if clear of infections the card was stamped. If infected the women were treated and their card was withheld until they were cleared of the infection. Prophylactic centres were set up for the troops to attend prior to visiting the brothels where they were issued condoms.

In 1942 it was estimated that there were 740 prostitutes working on the island, mainly in Nicosia, Famagusta and Limassol. Every major town except Kyrenia had a venereal clinic. Twelve prophylactic centres were established and a 200-bed venereal ward at Nicosia General Hospital.

== Sex trafficking ==
Cyprus is a source and destination country for women and children subjected to sex trafficking. Women, primarily from Eastern Europe, Vietnam, India, and sub-Saharan Africa, are subjected to sex trafficking. Sex trafficking occurs in private apartments and hotels, on the street, and within commercial sex outlets in Cyprus including bars, pubs, coffee shops, and cabarets. Some female sex trafficking victims are recruited with false promises of marriage or work as barmaids or hostesses. Unaccompanied children, children of migrants, Romani, and asylum-seekers are especially vulnerable to sex trafficking.

Law 60(I) of 2014 prohibits all forms of trafficking and prescribes penalties of up to 20 years imprisonment. The government investigated 13 suspects for sex trafficking in 2016 (seven in 2015).

The United States Department of State Office to Monitor and Combat Trafficking in Persons ranks Cyprus as a 'Tier 1' country.

== Northern Cyprus ==
The Turkish Republic of Northern Cyprus (TRNC) is only recognised as a separate state by Turkey. Prostitution is illegal, however in nightclubs, "konsomatrices", who sit with, eat with or entertain customers for money are allowed. Konsomatrices are not allowed to have sex with customers, but this restriction is frequently flouted. In 2016, authorities issued 1,314 six-month "hostess" and "barmaid" work permits for individuals working in nightclubs and two pubs operating in the north. During this period, 351 women worked under such permits. Nightclub owners hired female college students during this period to bypass the cap on the number of employees legally permitted in each club and avoid taxes and monitoring. Enforcement is generally lax, but in July 2006 the Nicosia District Court ordered the first prostitution-related imprisonment. After pleading no contest to the charges, the manager of Mexico nightclub, Mesut Kilicarslan, was sentenced to 15 days in prison for encouraging and profiting from prostitution. By the year's end three more suspects were sentenced to imprisonment for encouraging and profiting from prostitution.

NGOs reported a number of women entered the TRNC on three-month tourist or student visas and engaged in prostitution in apartments in north Nicosia, Kyrenia, and Famagusta.

Northern Cyprus has become a destination for sex tourism.

=== Sex trafficking in Northern Cyprus ===
The area is increasingly a destination for women from Central Asia, Eastern Europe, and Africa who are subjected to forced prostitution in nightclubs licensed and regulated by the Turkish Cypriot administration. Nightclubs provide a significant source of tax revenue for the Turkish Cypriot administration; media reports estimated nightclub owners pay between 20 and 30 million Turkish lira ($5.7–8.5 million) in taxes annually.

As the TRNC is not recognised by the United States, the United States Department of State Office to Monitor and Combat Trafficking in Persons does not give the area a country ranking. If it did it would be Tier 3.

== See also ==
- Prostitution in the British Overseas Territories#Akrotiri and Dhekelia
