= Prostitution in Chile =

Prostitution in Chile is legal, subject to regulation, but related activities such as keeping brothels and pimping are prohibited. Several hundred women were registered as prostitutes with the National Health Service.

Although illegal, brothels are set up in the more remote areas of Chile in ports, mining towns, logging areas or anywhere where there are men working away from home.

== Legal situation ==
The promotion and facilitation (procuring and advertising) of prostitution is prohibited, as well as everything related to those under 18 (although the age of sexual consent for consensual and non-commercial acts for heterosexuals is 14 years). Until 1998 male homosexual prostitution was banned as sodomy was considered a crime in Article 365 of the Penal Code.

The same code in articles 373 and 495 sanctions "offences to modesty, morals and good manners", which is applied to those who perform sexual acts in public of any nature, whether or not there is a commercial purpose. However, prostitution may be an aggravating factor of public order, depending on the criteria of Carabineros. However, police often detain prostitutes (usually as a result of complaints by neighbourhood residents) on charges of "offences against morality," which could lead to a 50,000 pesos (55 US dollars) fine or five days in prison.

The Sanitary Code refers to prostitution in Paragraph II of venereal diseases, which specifically prohibits brothels, but legitimises the existence of prostitution.

Chilean law requires sex workers to register with the Health Registry of the Ministry of Health (Minsal), and to undergo periodic medical checks. The Regulation on sexually transmitted infections and the Minsal's management and treatment guidelines includes specific sections on sex workers.

Sex workers have reported that law is frequently not enforced and there is corruption within the police.

== Sex trafficking ==
Most human trafficking victims are women and minors trafficked internally for sexual exploitation. Chilean women and girls respond to false job offers and subsequently are subjected to forced prostitution. Victims are also trafficked from the country to Argentina, Peru, Bolivia, the United States, Europe and Asia. Foreign women from Dominican Republic, Haiti, Ecuador, Colombia, and Paraguay, in addition to Asian countries such as China, are lured to Chile with fraudulent job offers and subsequently coerced into prostitution.

The United States Department of State Office to Monitor and Combat Trafficking in Persons ranks Chile as a 'Tier 1' country.

== Child prostitution ==
Inducing a minor (below age 18) to have sex in exchange for money or other favours is illegal. Punishment ranges from three to 20 years in prison and a 520,000 pesos (574 US dollars) fine depending on the age of the minor. A police sexual crimes brigade was specifically charged with investigating and prosecuting pedophilia and child pornography cases.

In 2003, the Government of Chile estimated that there were approximately 3,700 children involved in some form of commercial sexual exploitation; in 1999, UNICEF put the number of child prostitutes much higher, estimating that there were approximately 10,000 children between the ages of 6 and 18 involved in prostitution.

Arturo Herrera, the director of Chile's PDI investigative police, resigned in 2009 following scandal in which police officers were deeply involved in a child prostitution ring. It was alleged that police took payment in the form of sex with drugged girls in return for protection of two brothels in Valparaíso run by Carlos Parra Ruis.

== See also ==
- Prostitution in Easter Island
