= Prostitution in Moldova =

Prostitution in Moldova is an illegal activity but is widespread and socially acceptable. UNAIDS estimate there to be 12,000 prostitutes in the country.

Morals Police captain Vladimir Istrati is quoted as saying "Prostitution in Moldova is a very well organised crime, there is a precise structure of operation which includes secretary, office and owner." The secretary is hard to file evidence against because they are most likely to conceal their true activity behind offering exotic services over the phone. Nailing down prostitutes and pimps is easier."

Prostitution in Transnistria is punishable only by a fine, but there is no such clause as in the Moldovan legislation.

== Local names ==
Prostitutes in Moldova are known locally by a variety of names:

- Stradă (street worker) - work on the street, often drug addicts or alcoholics
- Scaun (stool) - work in bars and restaurants
- Lumânare (candle) - stand on the side of main roads
- Călători (travellers) - accompany car and truck drivers on journeys
- Prostituate cu acoperiș (prostitutes with a roof) - indoor workers
- Interdevochka (intergirls) - work in upmarket hotels, usually entertaining foreign clients
- NocinaiaBabocika (nightworkers) - work only at night for a very big amount of money

== History ==
Prostitution in Moldova was first recorded in the 2nd century BC. In the 19th century there is evidence of pimps being involved.

The trade's existence was initially denied during the Soviet era and then prohibited July 27 1987.

Until May 31, 2009, punishment was a fine or administrative arrest for up to 30 days, the administrative arrest was then replaced by unpaid work for a period of 20 to 40 hours.

On December 29, 2005, it was decided that sanctions would not apply to victims of trafficking; The new law "On Offences" gave this rule a broader wording: "a person engaging in prostitution contrary to their will".

== Sex trafficking ==
Since it is Europe's poorest country, it is a major exporter of human trafficking for the purpose of the sex trade. The CIA names human trafficking as one of the major crime issues of Moldova. Human traffickers primarily recruit women from poor villages. Women and children are trafficked for sexual exploitation to Turkey, Israel, the United Arab Emirates, Ukraine, Russia, Cyprus, Greece, Albania, Romania, Hungary, Slovakia, the Czech Republic, Austria, France, Italy, and Portugal. The annual country human rights report from the United States Department of State pinpoints some involvement by government officials and Moldovan law enforcement in human trafficking.

The United States Department of State issued a report in 2006 on human rights violations in Moldova stating:

"The country was a major country of origin for women and children trafficked abroad for forced prostitution and men and children who were trafficked to Russia and neighboring countries for forced labor and begging. The country was also a transit country for victims trafficked from Ukraine to Romania. Women and girls were trafficked to Turkey, Cyprus, Italy, Hungary, and the Balkan countries for prostitution. NGOs reported recent cases of victims trafficked to Saudi Arabia and Afghanistan. Women and girls reportedly were trafficked to Italy and Greece through Romania, Serbia and Montenegro, and Albania. According to the International Organization for Migration (IOM), victims have increasingly been directed to Asia, Russia, Turkey, Western Europe, and the Middle East. The IOM reported that the country was the main origin in Europe for women and children trafficked for forced prostitution."

The authorities have tried to lead awareness among the population about the extent of this problem, and during the early 2000s the authorities launched numerous information campaigns. One consisted of billboards in the streets of the capital Chişinău depicting a girl gripped in a huge clenched fist and being exchanged for dollars. The caption read: "You are not for sale".

E. Benjamin Skinner in his book "A Crime So Monstrous", on page 156, speculates that between 1991 and 2008, up to 400,000 women were trafficked from Moldova.

The United States Department of State Office to Monitor and Combat Trafficking in Persons ranks Moldova as a 'Tier 2' country.

== See also ==
- Prostitution in the Soviet Union
- Prostitution in Romania
- Prostitution in Transnistria
- Prostitution in Ukraine
