= KoreKorea =

Kiribati prostitutes for Korean fishermen

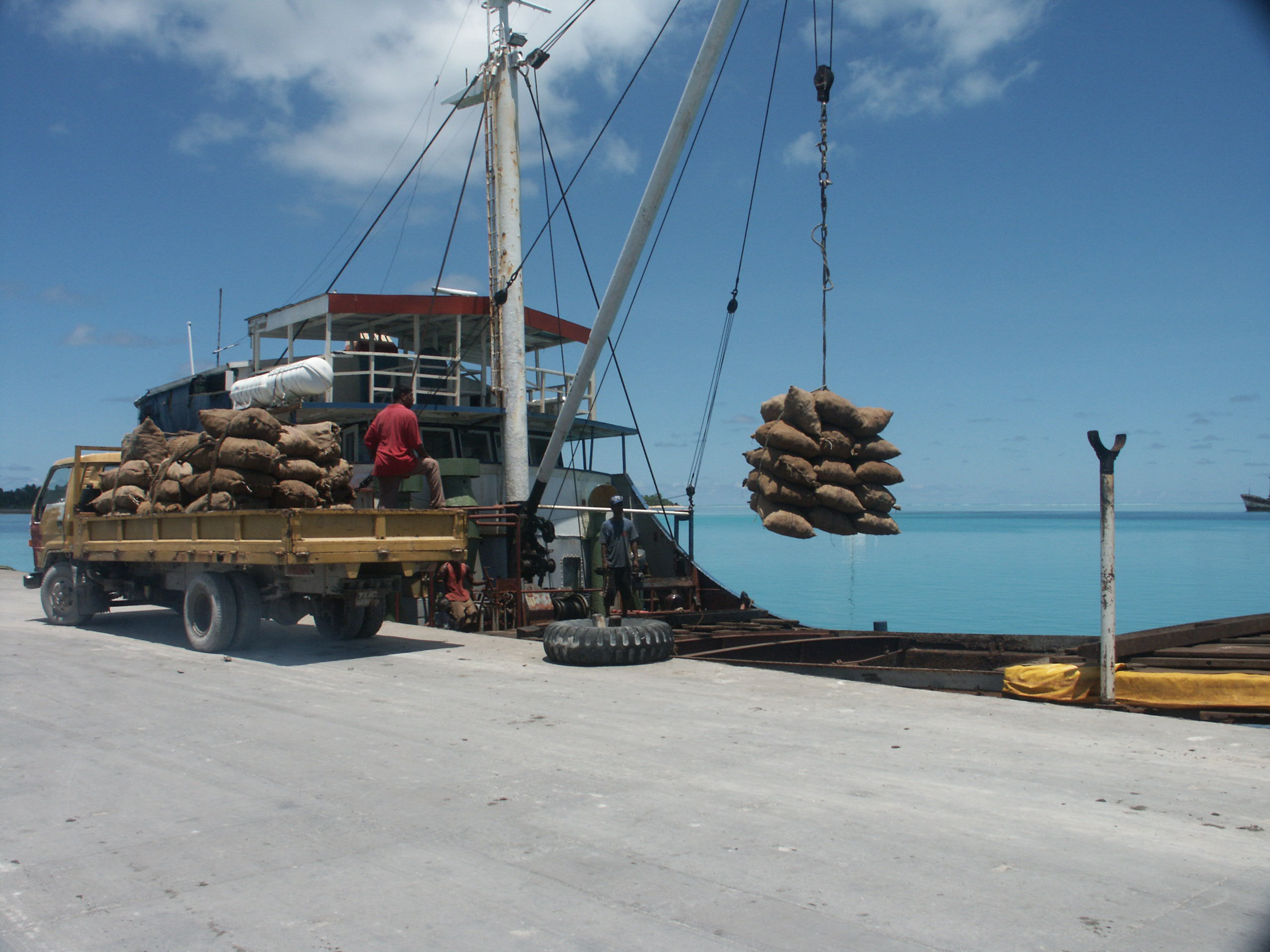
KoreKorea engage in sex with the crews of foreign fishing vessels berthed at Betio wharf.

KoreKorea was a term used for girls in Kiribati who Korean fishermen paid for sex. They are now called ainen matawa locally "in deference to Korean sensitivities", because the word "Korekorea" was overtly linked to the "principal nationality of their clients". Some of the girls are as young as fourteen years old. They board foreign fishing vessels and engage in sex in exchange for money, clothes and fish.

== Awareness ==
A 2005 news article in The Korea Times said that, according to ECPAT-Korea, "te korekorea" are "the best known cases of commercial sexual exploitation of children".

== Countries involved ==
=== Involvement of Kiribati ===
A 2006 news article in The Sydney Morning Herald said that "all Korean fishing boats" had been banned by Kiribati from going to Kiribati's ports for a time in 2003 following reports in The Korea Herald "that 30 to 50 girls, mostly under age, were servicing the Korean fishermen".

The KoreKorea issue is being addressed by a Korean institution in collaboration with the Kiribati Government cooperating with the ILO Youth unemployment programme and with the New Zealand's International Aid and Development Agency (NZAID).

=== Involvement of South Korea ===
A 2005 news article in The Korea Times said that the National Youth Commission would try to get the "Korean fishermen" punished as South Korea's "anti-juvenile-prostitution law" did not allow for "sex trade".

== Mixed children ==
A 2005 news article in The Hankyoreh said that children had been fathered by "some" "KoreKorea" and "Korean fishermen".

A 2010 report made by the International HIV Research Group of the University of New South Wales said that children had been fathered by "a number" of ainen matawa and "Korean seafarers", and the report said that the Korean fathers send financial support to these children.

== Ainen matawa ==
=== Age of ainen matawa ===
A 2005 news article in The Hankyoreh said that the KoreKorea females were about 18 years old.

A 2006 report by UNICEF Pacific said that "80 young te korekorea... had visited boats in port in 2000".

A 2007 news article in The Korea Times said that te korekorea were "teenage girls", and 8 of 24 of the interviewed te korekorea were younger than 19; one was 14 years old. The news article also said that the age when te korekorea first start was "getting younger".

A 2008 report by the Pacific Islands Forum Fisheries Agency said that "Teenage girls from the outer islands" were the group who were "particularly vulnerable to becoming te korekorea".

A 2010 report made by the International HIV Research Group of the University of New South Wales said that the ainen matawa were "young women".

A 2012 document made by the Kiribati Local Government Association explained the term ainen matawa with the words "teenage prostitution, involving very young girls".

A web page on UNICEF's website said that the korekorea were "young women".

=== Sexually transmitted infections ===
A 2007 study involving 80 ainen matawa (a 2010 study estimated there to be a total of 130) found only ~11% used condoms every time during sex, whilst 57.5% had at least one sexually transmitted infection.

=== Stigma of being ainen matawa ===
A 2013 document by the World Health Organization said that ainen matawa were inhibited from utilizing "sexual and reproductive health services", because of the "stigma, discrimination, violence and/or social exclusion" that they faced.

A 2013 report on the United States Department of State's website said that ainen matawa had a stigma within their society.

A 2014 report by WorldFish said that ainen matawa were "socially marginalized" for prostituting themselves, because what they were doing went against the values of their culture.

== See also ==
- Kopino, children of mixed Korean and Filipino descent who have an unwed Filipina mother
- Lai Đại Hàn, prostitution and rape by Korean soldiers in Vietnam
- Prostitution in Kiribati
- Prostitution in South Korea
