= Prostitution in the Americas =

Legal status of prostitution in North America

Legal status of prostitution in Central America and the Caribbean

Legal status of prostitution in South America

Legality of prostitution in the Americas varies by country. Most countries only legalized prostitution, with the act of exchanging money for sexual services legal. The level of enforcement varies by country. Some countries, such as the US and Canada, are unique in that the legality of prostitution is not the responsibility of the federal government but rather of the state, provincial, territorial, or federal district; this is due to their federalized systems.

Legend for maps

Decriminalization - No criminal penalties for prostitution
Legalization - prostitution legal and regulated
Abolitionism - prostitution is legal, but organized activities such as brothels and pimping are illegal; prostitution is not regulated
Neo-abolitionism - illegal to buy sex and for 3rd party involvement, legal to sell sex
Prohibitionism - prostitution illegal
Legality varies with local laws

== North America ==
=== Bermuda ===
Bermuda
- Prostitution legal Buying sex legal Brothels illegal Procuring illegal

Prostitution is legal in Bermuda but related activities such as running a brothel are illegal under the Criminal Code. Women coming to the island to work as prostitutes, or is a known prostitute, may be refused entry under the immigration laws. Many of the prostitutes in the country are from Philippines, Dominican Republic and Panama. In 2010 the visa requirements for people from these countries was changed to attempt to curb prostitution. Street prostitution occurs in the capital, Hamilton, on Front Street.

=== Canada ===
Canada
- Prostitution legal Buying sex illegal Brothels illegal Procuring illegal Solicitation illegal

Prostitution was traditionally legal as there were no laws prohibiting the exchange of sex for money or other consideration. On 20 December 2013, the Supreme Court of Canada found the laws prohibiting brothels, public communication for the purpose of prostitution, and living on the profits of prostitution to be unconstitutional. The ruling gave the Canadian parliament 12 months to rewrite the prostitution laws with a stay of effect so that the current laws remain in force. Amending legislation came into effect on 6 December 2014, which made the purchase of sexual services illegal, using the Swedish approach.

=== Greenland ===
Greenland
- Prostitution illegal Buying sex legal

Prostitution in Greenland is illegal. Although the country is subject to the law of Denmark in most areas of legislation, Denmark's decriminalization of prostitution in 1999 has not been applied in Greenland. In addition, Greenland is exempt from the obligations of the Palermo Protocol on human trafficking to which Denmark is a signatory, but there is little evidence of human trafficking in Greenland. A report published in 2008 indicated that Greenland had no signs of visible or organised prostitution, no services directed specifically at prostitutes and no instances of prostitution-related court cases. It did, however, refer to claims that transactional sex had sometimes been used, for example, in return for temporary housing. In a tradition associated with Greenlandic Inuit, hosts have been reported to have offered their wives to guests in a form of "hospitable prostitution". The colonists who founded the country's capital Nuuk in 1728 included prostitutes among their number.

=== Mexico ===
Mexico
- Prostitution legal under Federal law Each state enacts its own prostitution laws Prostitution is legal and regulated in 13 states Buying sex legal

Prostitution in Mexico is legal under Federal law. Each of the 31 states enacts its own prostitution laws and policies. 13 of the states of Mexico allow and regulate prostitution. Prostitution involving minors under 18 is illegal. Some Mexican cities have enacted "tolerance zones" ("zonas de tolerancia") which allow regulated prostitution and function as red light districts. In Tuxtla Gutiérrez, capital of the state of Chiapas, there is a state-run brothel at the Zona Galáctica. In most parts of the country, pimping is illegal, although pimp-worker relationships still occur, sometimes under female pimps called "madrotas". The government provides shelter for former prostitutes.

=== United States ===
United States
- Prostitution legal under Federal Law but prohibited in all states except in licensed brothels in certain rural counties of Nevada, and decriminalized in Maine; Buying sex legal under Federal Law but prohibited in all states except in licensed brothels in certain rural counties of Nevada, and decriminalized in Maine; No federal brothels law, de facto prohibited in all states except for certain rural counties of Nevada where brothels are licensed and regulated No federal procuring law, prohibited in all states No federal solicitation law, prohibited in all states except in Maine where it is decriminalized

Prostitution laws in the United States are determined at the state level. The practice is illegal in all but two of its 50 states and is illegal in all U.S. territories.

Nevada is the only U.S. jurisdiction which allows some legal prostitution in some of its counties. Currently 7 out of Nevada's 16 counties have active brothels. Prostitution outside these brothels is illegal throughout the state; prostitution is illegal in the major metropolitan areas (Las Vegas, Reno, and Carson City). Prostitution is heavily regulated by the state of Nevada (see Prostitution in Nevada).

Maine partially decriminalized prostitution following the Nordic model in 2023.

Recently, states such as New York and Washington also have considered legalizing or decriminalizing prostitution, but so far proposals have not materialized.

== Central America ==
=== Belize ===
Belize
- Prostitution legal Buying sex illegal Brothels illegal Procuring illegal Solicitation illegal

Prostitution is legal in Belize, but the buying of sexual services is not. Associated activities such as operating a brothel, loitering for the purposes of prostitution and soliciting sex are also illegal.

Prostitution is widespread and takes place on the streets and in brothels, bars, nightclubs and hotels.

Although denied by the government, the country is a destination for sex tourism. Child sex tourism is a problem, primarily by visitors from the United States.

=== Costa Rica ===
Costa Rica
- Prostitution legal Buying sex legal Brothels illegal Procuring illegal

Prostitution is not illegal but many of the activities surrounding it are illegal, as the law forbids promoting or facilitating the prostitution of another, and therefore pimping, brothels, or prostitution rings are illegal. Prostitution is common and is practiced openly throughout the country, particularly in popular tourism destinations. Websites list detailed locations and hotels that allow prostitutes. These online fraternities provide forums for sex tourists to compare experiences and act as a guide for future sex tourists.

=== El Salvador ===
El Salvador
- Prostitution legal under national law but may be prohibited by local laws Buying sex legal under national law but may be prohibited by local laws Brothels legal under national law but may be prohibited by local laws Procuring illegal

Prostitution itself is not prohibited by national law, but may be prohibited by local municipal ordinances. Municipal ordinances may also prohibit the purchase of sexual services. Related activities such as facilitating, promoting or giving incentives to a person to work as a prostitute (pimping) are illegal. The prostitution of children (those under 18) is also illegal. Brothel ownership, however, is legal. There are no specific laws against human trafficking, but any criminal offence that includes 'commerce in women or children' requires sentencing to be increased by 30%.

Those municipalities that do not prohibit sex work often set up zones for sex workers away from schools and churches. In the San Esteban area of San Salvador, 17 brothels were forcibly closed in August 1998 for being too close to schools and churches.

=== Guatemala ===
Guatemala
- Prostitution legal Buying sex legal Brothels legal Procuring illegal

Prostitution itself is legal but procuring is prohibited. There is an offence of "aggravated procuring" where a minor is involved. Keeping a brothel is not prohibited.

Prostitution is widespread in Guatemala; Guatemala City alone has 9 red-light districts, including La Linea, El Trebol and Parque Concordia. Statistics from the Vigilancia Centinela de las Infecciones de Transmisión Sexual (VICITS) sexual health clinics from 2007 to 2011, showed 10.8 percent of the sex workers worked on the streets, the rest working indoors at strip clubs, brothels based at residential homes, bars etc.

=== Honduras ===
Honduras
- Prostitution legal Buying sex legal Brothels illegal Procuring illegal

Prostitution is currently legal in Honduras. Because there is no law prohibiting prostitution, it is a prevalent form of occupation, especially amongst women and teenagers in cities. Although similar institutions such as brothel ownership and pimping are illegal, prostitution has remained largely unchecked by the government.

Lack of enforcement of current laws has created a profitable business out of prostitution — one in which both adults and children are a part. There are many causes to the high rates of involvement amongst the women and teens in cities, but the main reason is the high poverty levels. Participants see sex work as a viable option to escape poverty.

=== Nicaragua ===
Nicaragua
- Prostitution legal Buying sex legal Brothels illegal Procuring illegal

Prostitution is legal, but promoting prostitution and procuring are prohibited. The minimum age for prostitutes is 14 years old. It was estimated in 2015 that were around 15,000 prostitutes in the country.

Prostitution is common in Managua. Prostitutes work on the streets, in nightclubs and bars, or in massage parlors.

Prostitutes are known locally as "zorras".

=== Panama ===
Panama
- Prostitution legal and regulated Buying sex legal Brothels legal and regulated Procuring illegal

Prostitution is legal and regulated. Prostitutes are required to register and carry identification cards. However, the majority of prostitutes are not registered. 2,650 sex workers were registered with the government in 2008, but there was no accurate information regarding the total number of persons practising prostitution in the country. Some estimate put the number of unregistered prostitutes at 4,000.

The main area of prostitution in Panama City is El Cangrejo. Street prostitution also occurs on Avenida Mexico, Central Avenue and Avenida Perú.

== South America ==
=== Argentina ===
Argentina
- Prostitution legal under Federal law but illegal under local law in some areas Buying sex legal Brothels illegal Procuring illegal

Prostitution (exchanging sex for money) is legal under Federal law. Article 19 of the constitution states: "The private actions of people that do not offend in any way the public order and morality, nor damage a third person, are only reserved to God, and are exempt from the authority of the magistrates." Organised prostitution (brothels, prostitution rings and pimping) is illegal. In addition, individual provinces may place further restriction on the trade. For example, in San Juan, publicly offering sex services for money if punishable by up to 20 days in jail. In 2012, newspapers were banned from carrying classified-ads offering sexual services.

=== Bolivia ===
Bolivia
- Prostitution legal by registered prostitutes in licensed brothels Buying sex legal Brothels legal and regulated Procuring illegal Solicitation illegal

In Bolivia, prostitution is legal and regulated. It is only permitted by registered prostitutes in licensed brothels. Prostitutes must register and must undergo regular health checks for sexually transmitted diseases (every 20 days). The police are allowed to check whether the prostitutes are registered or not, and have attended a clinic during the previous 20 days.

In 2016 UNAIDS estimated there were 30,523 prostitutes in the country.

=== Brazil ===
Brazil
- Prostitution legal Buying sex legal Brothels illegal Procuring illegal Solicitation illegal

Prostitution that is the exchange of sex for money as there are no laws forbidding adults from being professional sex workers, but it is illegal to operate a brothel or to employ sex workers in any other way. Public order and vagrancy laws are used against street prostitutes. The affordability of prostitutes is the most inquired-about term in word completion queries on purchases on Google.

A 2013 survey published by UNAIDS estimated there to be 546,848 prostitutes in the country.

=== Chile ===
Chile
- Prostitution legal and regulated Buying sex legal Brothels illegal Procuring illegal Solicitation illegal

Adult prostitution is legal, subject to regulation, but related activities such as keeping brothels and pimping are prohibited. Several hundred women were registered as prostitutes with the National Health Service, and undergo mandatory medical examinations.

Although illegal, brothels are set up in the more remote areas of Chile in ports, mining towns, logging areas or anywhere where there are men working away from home.

=== Colombia ===
Colombia
- Prostitution legal and regulated in brothels in designated tolerance zones Buying sex legal Brothels legal in designated tolerance zones Procuring illegal Solicitation illegal

Prostitution is legal, regulated and limited to brothels in designated "tolerance zones". Sex workers are required to regular health checks. However the laws are rarely applied and prostitution is widespread, partly due to poverty and internal displacement.

Domestically, organized crime networks, some related to illegal armed groups, are responsible for human trafficking for sexual slavery and the armed conflict has made a large number of internal trafficking victims vulnerable.

UNAIDS estimate there to be 7,218 prostitutes in the country.

=== Ecuador ===
Ecuador
- Prostitution legal by registered prostitutes in licensed brothels Buying sex legal Brothels legal and regulated Procuring illegal Solicitation illegal

Prostitution is legal and regulated, as long as the prostitute is over the age of 18, registered, and works from a licensed brothel. Prostitution is widespread throughout the country. Many brothels and prostitutes operate outside the regulatory system and the regulations have been less strictly enforced in recent years. 25,000 prostitutes were registered in 2000. In 2007 it was estimated that 70% of the prostitutes in the country were from Colombia. The country attracts Colombian prostitutes as the currency is the US$ rather than the unstable Colombian peso.

Quito was the first city in Ecuador to regulate prostitution in 1921, requiring prostitutes to be tested weekly for STIs and the results recorded in the "Register of Venereal Disease". Testing and any necessary treatment was free to the prostitutes. Guayaquil and Riobamba introduced a similar system of regulation in 1925. In 1939, about 1,000 prostitutes were registered in Quito.

=== Falkland Islands ===
Falkland Islands
- Prostitution legal Buying sex legal Brothels illegal Procuring illegal Solicitation illegal

Prostitution in the Falkland Islands is legal but related activities such as solicitation and keeping a brothel are prohibited by the Crimes Ordinance 2014. A man compelling his wife to become a prostitute is a grounds for divorce under the Matrimonial Proceedings (Summary Jurisdiction) Ordinance 1967. Soldiers returning from tours on the islands report little or no prostitution in the Falkland Islands.

=== French Guiana ===
French Guiana
- Prostitution illegal Buying sex legal

Although illegal, prostitution in French Guiana is common, especially in the gold mining areas of the interior. Some people are driven into prostitution by poverty. The HIV rate is the highest of any French territory, and sex workers are at risk due to inconsistent condom use.

=== Guyana ===
Guyana
- Prostitution illegal Buying sex legal

Prostitution is illegal but widespread. Prostitution law is antiquated and dates from the colonial era. Law enforcement is inconsistent and sex workers report violence and abuse by the police. Many turn to prostitution for economic reasons and the lack of other job opportunities. Prostitution continues to receive greater public attention due to the high incidence of HIV/AIDS among prostitutes. Prostitution in the country is separated into three types: "uptown", servicing affluent clients, "downtown", servicing the working classes, and mining sites.

=== Paraguay ===
Paraguay
- Prostitution legal Buying sex legal Brothels illegal Procuring illegal Solicitation illegal

Prostitution is legal for persons over the age of 18, but related activities such as brothel keeping are prohibited. Prostitution is common in the country. Brothels are also common, even some rural villages have a small bar/brothel on the outskirts.

Whilst there is no red-light district in the capital, Asunción, street prostitution is widespread in the city centre, especially around Plaza Uruguaya. Brothels are also common in the city centre. Prostitutes can also be found in bars and discos.

=== Peru ===
Peru
- Prostitution legal and regulated Buying sex legal Brothels legal and regulated

Prostitution between adults is legal for women and men over 18 years of age if they register with municipal authorities and carry a health certificate. Brothels must be licensed. The vast majority of prostitutes work in the informal sector, where they lack health protection. Individual police officers tolerate the operation of unlicensed brothels.

=== Suriname ===
Suriname
- Prostitution illegal Buying sex legal

Prostitution is illegal but widespread and the laws are rarely enforced. Human trafficking and child prostitution are problems in the country. Prostitutes are known locally as "motyo".

Although prostitution is illegal, the country issues temporary work permits to migrant prostitutes travelling through Suriname en route to another country.

Prostitutes often rent rooms in hotels and attract clients in the hotel's bar or outside the hotel.

=== Uruguay ===
Uruguay
- Prostitution legal and regulated Buying sex legal Brothels legal and regulated Procuring illegal Solicitation restricted

Prostitution was legislated in 2002 through the sex work law (17.515). Before that, prostitution was unlegislated but was not illegal, since the constitution allows any activity that is not explicitly forbidden by law.

UNAIDS estimate there to be 8,195 prostitutes in Uruguay.

=== Venezuela ===
Venezuela
- Prostitution legal and regulated Buying sex legal Brothels legal and regulated Procuring illegal

Sex work in Venezuela is legal and regulated. The country's Ministry of Health and Social Development requires sex workers to carry identification cards and to have monthly health checkups. Prostitution is common, particularly in Caracas and in other domestic tourist destinations. The Venezuelan sex work industry arose in conjunction with the oil industry of the twentieth century and continues today.

== Caribbean ==
=== Anguilla ===
Anguilla
- Prostitution legal Buying sex legal Brothels illegal Procuring illegal Solicitation illegal

Prostitution is legal in Anguilla, but related activities such as brothel keeping, are illegal under sections 171 - 181 of the Criminal Code. Brothels are common on the island, and most villages have a 'sports bar' where prostitutes work. These bars have bedrooms at the back that the prostitutes use. Many of the prostitutes are from Venezuela. Law enforcement turns a blind eye to these activities.

=== Antigua and Barbuda ===
Antigua and Barbuda
- Prostitution legal Buying sex legal Brothels illegal Procuring illegal Solicitation illegal

Prostitution in Antigua and Barbuda is legal and common. Related activities such as brothel keeping and solicitation are prohibited. UNAIDS estimate there to be 755 prostitutes on the islands, the majority are migrants from other Caribbean countries. They tend to more around the Caribbean, never staying in one territory for long. Prostitution is on the rise due to economic conditions,

In the capital, St. John's, there is a red-light district in Popeshead Street. The most famous brothel in the street was Wendy's. It had operated for a number of years and was a household name on the island. In 2016 the owners were charged with trafficking. A 'rescue mission' raided the establishment in 2018, looking for trafficking victims. The nearby 'Jam Dung' was also raided.

=== Bahamas ===
Bahamas
- Prostitution legal Buying sex legal Brothels illegal Procuring illegal Solicitation illegal

Prostitution in the Bahamas is legal but related activities such as brothel keeping and solicitation are prohibited. The country is a sex tourism destination, including "all in" tours. UNAIDS estimate there are 3,000 prostitutes in the Bahamas.

During the Republic of Pirates (c. 1706 – 1718), Nassau and the rest of New Providence Island was a paradise of drinking and prostitution for pirates.

Sex trafficking is a problem on the island.

=== Barbados ===
Barbados
- Prostitution legal Buying sex legal Brothels illegal Procuring illegal Solicitation illegal

Prostitution in Barbados is legal but related activities such as brothel keeping and solicitation are prohibited. The country is a sex tourism destination.

There is a red-light district in Nelson street, and street prostitution around The Garrison. About half of the prostitutes are from Guyana.

Sex trafficking is a problem in the country.

=== British Virgin Islands ===
British Virgin Islands
- Prostitution legal Buying sex legal Brothels illegal Procuring illegal Solicitation illegal

Prostitution is legal in the British Virgin Islands, but related activities such as soliciting and procuring are illegal. Known prostitutes or those known to be living off the proceeds of prostitution can be refused entry visas to the country. Prostitution occurs mainly in brothels and strip clubs. The National AIDS Programme distributes condoms and advice to the sex workers.

=== Cayman Islands ===
Cayman Islands
- Prostitution legal Buying sex legal Brothels illegal Procuring illegal

Prostitution in the Cayman Islands is legal but related activities such as brothel keeping are prohibited by the Penal Code.

=== Cuba ===
Cuba
- Prostitution legal Buying sex legal

Prostitution in Cuba has always been a legal profession, though it has periodically been regulated or repressed. Since the commencement of the Special Period in the early 1990s it has become associated with jineterismo, a category of illegal or semi-legal economic activities related to tourism in Cuba. The low level of HIV/AIDS infection and the relatively inexpensive price of sex have made the island popular with foreigners as a sex tourism destination.

=== Dominica ===
Dominica
- Prostitution legal Buying sex legal Brothels illegal Procuring illegal Solicitation illegal

Prostitution in Dominica is legal and common. Related activities such as brothel keeping and solicitation are prohibited. Law enforcement is lax.

=== Dominican Republic ===
Dominican Republic
- Prostitution legal Buying sex legal Brothels illegal Procuring illegal

Prostitution is legal, but a third party may not derive financial gain from prostitution (brothels or similar establishments are illegal). However, the government usually does not enforce prostitution laws.

It is estimated between 60,000 and 100,000 women work as prostitutes in the country, many from neighbouring Haiti.

=== Dutch Caribbean ===
Dutch Caribbean
- Prostitution legal and regulated Buying sex legal Brothels legal and regulated Procuring illegal

Prostitution in the Dutch Caribbean (Aruba, Bonaire, Curaçao, Saba, Sint Eustatius and Sint Maarten) is legal and regulated. There are legal brothels in Bonaire, Sint Maarten, and Curacao, the largest of which is Campo Alegre.

Curaçao, Aruba, and Sint Maarten are destination islands for women trafficked for the sex trade from Peru, Brazil, Colombia, the Dominican Republic, and Haiti, In 2011, a human trafficking ring was broken up after trafficking women for sex exploitation from Colombia to Aruba, Curaçao, Sint Maarten, and Bonaire.

=== Grenada ===
Grenada
- Prostitution illegal Buying sex legal

Prostitution in Grenada is illegal but common. It is practised discreetly and there are few convictions.

=== Guadeloupe ===
Guadeloupe
- Prostitution legal Buying sex illegal Brothels illegal Procuring illegal Solicitation illegal

Despite the law, prostitution occurs in Guadeloupe. The old town centre of Pointe-à-Pitre is taken over by prostitutes from the Dominican Republic plying their trade after dark, and abandoned houses are turned into makeshift brothels. The Grand-Baie area in the Pointe-à-Pitre suburb of Le Gosier is also known for prostitution, as is Saint-François, where many prostitutes work. Dominican prostitutes also work from bars in Le Gosier.

=== Haiti ===
Haiti
- Prostitution illegal Buying sex legal

Prostitution is illegal, but the country used to be a premier destination in the 1970s for sex tourism for adults. Since the 1940s, prostitution rings made up of Dominican women have circulated about the capital and today, are found in the suburb of Pétion-Ville. A premium is placed on Dominican women due to their lighter skin and mixed race appearance.

=== Jamaica ===
Jamaica
- Prostitution illegal Buying sex legal

Prostitution in Jamaica is illegal but widely tolerated, especially in tourist areas.

The island is a destination for sex tourism. The Terry McMillan novel, and later film, How Stella Got Her Groove Back, was based on female sex tourism in Jamaica. Transactional sex also occurs.

Sex trafficking is a problem in the country.

=== Martinique ===
Martinique
- Prostitution legal Buying sex illegal Brothels illegal Procuring illegal Solicitation illegal

The first laws on prostitution in Martinique were passed in the 1850s. They were designed to keep prostitutes away from public areas but were poorly enforced. In the 1930s, after the emergence of tourism and the start of WW2, a new set of laws were enabled. The new laws targeted prostitution in the bars and restaurants of Fort-de-France, which the colonial authorities believed were a major factor of STIs. As a result, all waitresses and hostesses had to have a valid "certificat de non contagiosité", whether they were prostitutes or not. The aim of the authorities was to move all prostitution into brothels. The women were reluctant to work in the brothels, so prostitution remained in the bars and restaurants.

=== Montserrat ===
Montserrat
- Prostitution legal Buying sex legal Brothels illegal Procuring illegal

Prostitution in Montserrat is legal and common. However related activities such as controlling prostitution or living off the earnings of prostitution are prohibited by the Penal Code.

Following the eruption of the Soufrière Hills Volcano in 1997 that buried the capital, Plymouth, many migrant workers came to the island from Guyana, Jamaica, Haiti and the Dominican Republic. With them came prostitutes, especially from the Dominican Republic, and prostitution on the island increased.

=== Puerto Rico ===
Puerto Rico
- Prostitution illegal Buying sex illegal

Prostitution in Puerto Rico has always been seen as taboo and illegal. However, due to the declining economy, the Puerto Rican government considered legalizing prostitution in 2014.

=== Saint Kitts and Nevis ===
Saint Kitts and Nevis
- Prostitution illegal Buying sex legal

Prostitution in Saint Kitts and Nevis is illegal in Section 40 of the Small Charges Act CAP 4.36 .

=== Saint Lucia ===
Saint Lucia
- Prostitution illegal Buying sex legal

Prostitution is illegal but tolerated. Prostitution laws are rarely enforced. There are reports that strip clubs are used as fronts for prostitution, and that some are owned, or protected by corrupt police officials.

The country is a destination for female sex tourism.

Sex trafficking and child prostitution are problems in the country.

=== Saint Martin ===
Saint Martin
- Prostitution legal Buying sex legal Brothels illegal Procuring illegal Solicitation illegal

The growth of tourism starting in the 1970s caused an increase in prostitution in Saint Martin. Although outlawed in 1946 by the "Loi de Marthe Richard", brothels were tolerated until the introduction of the new Penal code in 1991. One hotel, now closed, was reserved for French civil servants and reputedly offered the guests European prostitutes.

Despite laws prohibiting soliciting, street prostitution still exists, especially in the Quartier-d'Orleans.

=== Saint Vincent and the Grenadines ===
Saint Vincent and the Grenadines
- Prostitution illegal Buying sex legal

Prostitution in Saint Vincent and the Grenadines is illegal but occurs.

Sex trafficking is a problem in the country.

=== Trinidad and Tobago ===
Trinidad and Tobago
- Prostitution illegal Buying sex legal

Prostitution in Trinidad and Tobago is illegal and related activities such as brothel keeping, soliciting and pimping are illegal.

In Trinidad, Port of Spain is the main place of sex work, including street prostitution on Roberts and Murray Streets. New brothels continue to open across the country, particularly in the south where they are incorporated into small bars and rum shops and are difficult to detect, and in central, where they operate out of a normal-looking flats in a neighbourhood. Many of the sex workers come from Colombia, Venezuela and Cuba. Some regularly commute between their home nation and Trinidad.

Prostitution in less common in Tobago, some prostitutes from Trinidad move to Tobago for the tourist season.

=== Turks and Caicos Islands ===
Turks and Caicos Islands
- Prostitution legal Buying sex legal Brothels illegal Procuring illegal

Prostitution is common on the Turks and Caicos Islands, especially in Providenciales. Many of the sex workers are from Eastern Europe and the Dominican Republican. There is some female sex tourism on the islands. Sex trafficking and HIV are problems in the country.

=== U.S. Virgin Islands ===
U.S. Virgin Islands
- Prostitution illegal Buying sex legal

Prostitution in the U.S. Virgin Islands is illegal but occurs.

In 1985, 68 prostitutes were smuggled from Sint Maarten to Saint Thomas in the U.S. Virgin Islands in a sealed shipping container, of whom 28 died of suffocation.
