= Prostitution in the British Overseas Territories =

The British Overseas Territories (BOT) or alternatively, United Kingdom Overseas Territories (UKOTs), are 14 territories under the jurisdiction and sovereignty of the United Kingdom. They are the parts of the British Empire that have not been granted independence or have voted to remain British territories. These territories do not form part of the United Kingdom. Most of the inhabited territories are internally self-governing, with the UK retaining responsibility for defence and foreign relations. The rest are either uninhabited or have a transitory population of military or scientific personnel.

== Akrotiri and Dhekelia ==
The territories of Akrotiri and Dhekelia are British military bases on the island of Cyprus. The large presence of British troops on the island led to laws on prostitution while Cyprus was under British administration.

== Anguilla ==
Prostitution is legal in Anguilla, but related activities such as brothel keeping, are illegal under sections 171 - 181 of the Criminal Code. Brothels are common on the island, and most villages have a 'sports bar' where prostitutes work. These bars have bedrooms at the back that the prostitutes use. Many of the prostitutes are from Venezuela. Law enforcement turns a blind eye to these activities.

In 2016, photojournalist Belinda Soncini produced a photo-blog of about the prostitutes on the island entitled 'Desperate Women: Venezuela's Latest Export'.

== Bermuda ==
Prostitution is legal in Bermuda but related activities such as running a brothel are illegal under the Criminal Code. Women coming to the island to work as prostitutes, or a known prostitute, may be refused entry under the immigration laws. Many of the prostitutes in the country are from Philippines, Dominican Republic and Panama. In 2010 the visa requirements for people from these countries was changed to attempt to curb prostitution. Street prostitution occurs in the capital, Hamilton, on Front Street.

=== History ===
Bermuda has a long history of prostitution fuelled by the British garrison and sailors visiting the island. One of the best known former brothels, The Queen Of The East, was demolished in 2016. It was originally built in the 1740s. In 1968, when homosexuality was still outlawed in the Royal Navy, the 'Bermuda case' caused concern to naval authorities. The owner of a gay brothel on the island had recorded the names and ships of more than 400 sailors who had visited the brothel, potentially making them the targets for blackmail.

== British Antarctic Territory ==
The British Antarctic Territory is uninhabited except for research personnel.

== British Indian Ocean Territory ==
The islands of the British Indian Ocean Territory are uninhabited except for military personnel and contractors.

== British Virgin Islands ==
Prostitution is legal in the British Virgin Islands, but related activities such as soliciting and procuring are illegal. Known prostitutes or those known to be living off the proceeds of prostitution can be refused entry visas to the country. Prostitution occurs mainly in brothels and strip clubs, especially in the capital, Road Town. The National AIDS Programme distributes condoms and advice to the sex workers.

== Cayman Islands ==
Prostitution in the Cayman Islands is legal but related activities such as brothel keeping are prohibited by the Penal Code.

== Falkland Islands ==
Prostitution in the Falkland Islands is legal but related activities such as solicitation and keeping a brothel are prohibited by the Crimes Ordinance 2014. A man compelling his wife to become a prostitute is a grounds for divorce under the Matrimonial Proceedings (Summary Jurisdiction) Ordinance 1967. Soldiers returning from tours on the islands report little or no prostitution in the Falkland Islands.

== Gibraltar ==
Prostitution is illegal in Gibraltar, as are related activities.

=== History ===
In 1725 there were about 1,000 Catholics and Jews living in Gibraltar (under British control since 1713), and about 100 British. Some of the British women were prostitutes.

The British military buildup on Gibraltar started during the Spanish siege of 1727. One diarist noted that in that year there was much excitement as a ship was due in from Ireland with prostitutes on board.

In the 19th century, the military authorities in charge took the view prostitution was inevitable where soldiers and sailors were stationed. A rescindable permit was required by non-British people to enter and reside in Gibraltar. The permits were only issued to prostitutes if they agreed to a weekly medical examination. Failure to comply once in Gibraltar would result in the permit being withdrawn. British prostitutes in Gibraltar were brought into the scheme by withdrawing permits to any alien prostitutes who they resided with if the British prostitute didn't accompany them to the examination. The police kept a close scrutiny on the brothels and the prostitutes. By the end of the 19th century, prostitution had centred around a street called Seruya's Ramp, known locally as Calle Peligro. By this time most of the prostitutes were Spanish nationals. In 1892 it was noted by an official in the Colonial Office that 47 'native' prostitutes was too few to service the needs of the 4,926 men in the garrison plus sailors from ships docked in the harbour.

When the brothels were shut down and prostitution banned by Governor Sir Horace Smith-Dorrien in January 1922, the prostitutes moved across the Spanish border to the Calle Gibraltar area in La Línea.

== Montserrat ==
Prostitution in Montserrat is legal and common. However related activities such as controlling prostitution or living off the earnings of prostitution are prohibited by the Penal Code.

Following the eruption of the Soufrière Hills Volcano in 1997 that buried the capital, Plymouth, many migrant workers came to the island from Guyana, Jamaica, Haiti and the Dominican Republic. With them came prostitutes, especially from the Dominican Republic, and prostitution on the island increased.

== Pitcairn, Henderson, Ducie and Oeno Islands ==
The Pitcairn, Henderson, Ducie and Oeno Islands are virtually uninhabited.

Apart from involvement in child prostitution, there are no prostitution laws on the Pitcairn Islands.

The population of the islands is estimated at 50. However, in the late 1930s, when the population reached its highest of 250, the pastor of the islands complained to the High Commissioner that prostitution on the islands was "very common."

== Saint Helena, Ascension and Tristan da Cunha ==
Saint Helena criminalised brothels according to the Protection of Women Ordinance, 1930. The ordinance focuses on prohibiting the control or coercion of others for prostitution and public solicitation, but do not restrict individual sex workers who are acting on private property.

More information is needed about Ascension and Tristan da Cunha.

== South Georgia and the South Sandwich Islands ==
The South Georgia and the South Sandwich Islands have no permanent inhabitants.

== Turks and Caicos Islands ==
Prostitution is common on the Turks and Caicos Islands, especially in Providenciales. Many of the sex workers are from Eastern Europe and the Dominican Republic. There is some female sex tourism on the islands. Sex trafficking and HIV are problems in the country.

== See also ==
- Prostitution in Overseas France
