= Prostitution in the Dutch Caribbean =

Prostitution in the Dutch Caribbean (Aruba, Bonaire, Curaçao, Saba, Sint Eustatius, and Sint Maarten) is legal and regulated. At least 500 foreign women are reportedly working in prostitution throughout the islands. Bonaire, Sint Eustatius, and Curaçao are sex tourism destinations.

There is a single state-sanctioned brothel on the islands of Bonaire, and Sint Maarten. The brothel in Curaçao closed in 2020.

Curaçao, Aruba, and Sint Maarten are destination islands for women trafficked for the sex trade from Venezuela, Brazil, Colombia, Peru, the Dominican Republic, and Haiti. In 2011, a human trafficking ring was broken up after trafficking women for sex exploitation from Colombia to Aruba, Curaçao, Sint Maarten, and Bonaire.

== Aruba ==
Prostitution in Aruba started to expand when oil refineries were opened on the island in the 1920s. Many prostitutes migrated to the island to service the oil workers and sailors from the oil tankers. In 1928, the Government set up a regulated area of prostitution (red-light district) in the oil refining town of Sint Nicolaas. Unlike the neighbouring island of Curaçao, the government was prevented from opening a state-run brothel by opposition from the Catholic Church and local women's groups.

Regulations started during the 1950s allowed women to work for up to 3 months as "nightclub hostesses" in the bars and clubs of Sint Nicolaas' red-light district. Women from Colombia, Venezuela, Cuba, Panama and the Dominican Republic came to the island to work in the clubs and bars.

Currently, regulated prostitution is limited to one zone in Sint Nicolaas. There are women of various nationalities working here, especially Colombian and Venezuelan. The prostitutes working in this area require an "adult entertainer" work permit that lasts 3 months. They have to have a medical examination before starting and then weekly check-up thereafter. The woman have individual rooms over the bars that they work from. Off-duty policemen sometimes work as security at the bars. There is also unregulated prostitution in bars outside the permitted zone. Street prostitution, although illegal, also occurs on the island. There is also evidence of prostitution in the more rural areas, often by women originally from the Dominican Republic.

There are also escorts on the island advertising on the Internet and newspapers aimed at tourists. They operate outside the government's regulations, so are not required to have regular health checks or permits.

Sex trafficking, especially of Venezuelan women, is a problem on the island.

== Bonaire ==
Bonaire permits a single brothel, For 40 years this was the "Pachi". in 2013, the owner was arrested following allegations of human trafficking and the brothel shut. The "Men's Heaven", operating in the Hamlet hotel, has applied for the permit. In 2020 politician Esther Bernabela spoke out against the rise in prostitution in Bonaire.

== Curaçao ==
Prostitution has been known to exist in Curaçao since pirates and privateers used the island in the 17th century. In the 1920s, oil refineries were opened on the island. Women migrated to the island to service the needs of the oil workers and sailors from the tankers. In the 1930s and 1940s, Venezuelan, Colombian, and Dominican prostitutes operated in the town centre. The arrival of the Dutch, British and American navies to guard the island in the 1940s increased the demand for prostitutes. The government banned prostitution from the town centre, but this was unenforceable.

The governor appointed a commission that included the police, the public health department and the clergy with a view to solving the prostitution problem. They concluded that the best alternative was to concentrate prostitution in one location away from the town centre. The plan was for a complex of appeasements where prostitutes could work independently. On 30 May 1949, the complex named Campo Alegre (also called Le Mirage) was opened. Only foreign prostitutes were allowed to work there, regular health checks are carried out and the women have to carry a health certificate ("pink card"). The brothel was the largest brothel in the Caribbean, however in March 2020, Campo Alegre closed as a result of the COVID-19 pandemic. In June 2020, the company filed for bankruptcy, and the brothel closed. The facilities are auctioned in June 2022. Within stricter legal rules, prostitution can be resumed.

Some prostitution occurs in other bars on the island and in small unlicensed brothels. Open-air "snacks", where drinks and fast food are served are also places prostitutes attract clients.

Sex trafficking is a problem on the island. Curaçao is a transit and destination country for women and children subjected to sex trafficking. Vulnerable populations include foreign and Curaçaoan women and girls in unregulated prostitution. Due to the deteriorating situation in Venezuela, legal and illegal migration to Curaçao increased, leaving many vulnerable to trafficking, including women working illegally at bars and brothels.

== Saba ==
Due to its low population (1,991 in 2013), there are no reports of permanent prostitution on the island. It was reported in 2013 that "dancers" were coming to the island at weekends and engaging in prostitution.

== Sint Eustatius ==
It has been reported that one or possibly two brothels exist on St Eustatia.

== Sint Maarten ==
Sint Maarten has the second largest brothel in the area, the "Seamans Club". It was set up in the 1960s to service the needs of the fishermen in the newly created fishing industry. As the bulk of these fishermen are Japanese, it is known locally as the "Japanese Club".

Prostitution also occurs in nightclubs and hotels. Dancers in lap dancing and striptease establishments sometimes offer sexual services as a sideline. There are also a number of illegal small brothels on the island.

Generally, prostitution is accepted in Sint Maarten and seen as a necessary part of the tourism industry.

Sex trafficking is a problem on the island. Sint Maarten is a transit, and destination country for women and children subjected to sex trafficking. Women and girls from Latin America, the Caribbean, Eastern Europe, and Russia are the most vulnerable to sex trafficking, including women working in regulated and unregulated brothels and dance clubs. Some foreign women in St. Maarten's commercial sex industry are subjected to debt bondage.
