= Prostitution in Azerbaijan =

Prostitution in Azerbaijan is illegal but common. Prostitution is an administrative offence and punishable by a fine. Keeping a brothel is a criminal offence and punishable by up to 6 years' imprisonment. In 2017 a draft law proposing to add heavy fines to the punishment for keeping a brothel was before the National Assembly. It has been estimated that there are 25,054 prostitutes in Azerbaijan, some of which are aged 15 to 18.

During the Soviet era prostitution was uncommon except for those under the control of the KGB, many of whom were informants.

In the Badamdar district of the capital, Baku, there are many cafes where prostitutes solicit clients. In 2011, over 300 local residents held a protest against the situation. Prostitutes can also be found in cafes in Nizami Street (known locally as "Torgovaya" – Trade Street) in downtown Baku.

The country is a sex tourism destination, particularly with men from Iran, the United Arab Emirates and Kuwait.

== Sex trafficking ==
Human traffickers exploit domestic and foreign victims in Azerbaijan, and traffickers exploit victims from Azerbaijan abroad. Women and children from Azerbaijan are subjected to sex trafficking within the country and in Georgia, Iran, Malaysia, Pakistan, Russia, Turkey, and the UAE. Azerbaijan is a destination country for sex trafficking victims from China, Russia, Turkmenistan, Ukraine, and Uzbekistan. In previous years, Azerbaijan has been used as a transit country for victims of sex trafficking from Central Asia to Iran, Turkey, and the UAE.

The 2005 Law on the Fight against Trafficking in Persons and article 144 of the criminal code prohibit sex and lobar trafficking and prescribe penalties of five to ten years' imprisonment. The government investigated twenty-six cases of sexual exploitation in 2018, and convicted 21 sex traffickers, compared to 25 sex traffickers in 2017.

In 2019, the United States Department of State Office to Monitor and Combat Trafficking in Persons downgraded Azerbaijan to a 'Tier 2 watch list' country.

== See also ==
- Prostitution in the Soviet Union
