= Prostitution in Georgia (country) =

Prostitution in Georgia is illegal but widespread, particularly in the capital, Tbilisi. Many NGO's attribute this to the harsh economic conditions according to the US State Department. Prostitution occurs on the streets, in bars, nightclubs, hotels and brothels. UNAIDS estimate there are 6,525 prostitutes in Georgia.

The Black Sea resorts become a sex tourism destination in the summer months. Many prostitutes, mainly Central Asians and Russians from the North Caucasus come to the area. Due to the close proximity of the Turkish border, and no visa requirements for Turks, many men from Turkey come to the area to find prostitutes.

Child prostitution is a problem in the country.

== Legal situation ==
Prostitution is punishable by a fine. Related activities are prohibited by the criminal code:

- Article 143^{1} - Human trafficking
- Article 171 - Child prostitution
- Article 253 - Forced prostitution
- Article 254 - Premises used for prostitution

Prostitutes are sometimes arrested for public order offences.

== Sexual health ==
Georgia has a high rate of STIs, especially near the Turkish border. Although UNAIDS report high condom use between sex workers and clients (95.4%), sex workers are a high risk group. Infections are usually transferred during violent attacks by clients. Stigmatisation prevents some sex workers accessing healthcare. There is a 10.8% active syphilis rate and 0.7% HIV prevalence amongst sex workers according to UNAIDS.

Condom and lube distribution and also redirection for treatment are provided by the NGO Tanadgoma.

== Sex trafficking ==
Georgia is a source, transit, and destination country for women and girls subjected to sex trafficking. Women and girls from Georgia are subjected to sex trafficking within the country, in Turkey, and, to a lesser extent, in China and the United Arab Emirates. Georgia is also a transit country for women from Central Asia exploited in Turkey. Women from Azerbaijan and Central Asia are subjected to forced prostitution in the tourist areas of the Adjara region and in saunas, strip clubs, casinos, and hotels. The majority of identified trafficking victims are young, foreign women seeking employment.

In 2006 the country incorporated into its domestic law the Protocol to Prevent, Suppress, and Punish Trafficking in Persons, Especially Women and Children, supplementing the UN Convention against Transnational Organized Crime, and the Council of Europe Convention on Action against Trafficking in Human Beings. The punishment for human trafficking in Georgia is 15 years. There is also a special law to protect families of Georgian women who fear reprisals from gang masters of women who refuse to be forced into prostitution abroad.

The government investigated 12 new cases of sex trafficking in 2016, compared to 11 in 2015. The government prosecuted one defendant for sex trafficking in 2016, compared to two defendants in 2015.

The United States Department of State Office to Monitor and Combat Trafficking in Persons ranks Georgia as a 'Tier 1' country.

== Disputed territories ==
Although Abkhazia and South Ossetia have declared independence from Georgia and are self-governing, they are not generally internationally recognised.

=== Abkhazia ===
According to Georgian officials, prostitution in Abkhazia is rampant, including child prostitution. HIV amongst sex workers is estimated to be 60%-70% in some areas.

=== South Ossetia ===
Following the conflict in South Ossetia, many men left to work in Russia. Some of the women who were left behind were forced to turn to prostitution to survive. Many adolescents have also turned to prostitution and child prostitution is a problem, especially in the capital, Tskhinvali.

== See also ==
- Prostitution in the Soviet Union
