= Prostitution in Chad =

Prostitution in Chad is illegal but common, especially in the urban centres and the south of the country. UNAIDS estimates there are 1,200 prostitutes in the country. Many are from Cameroon.

== Allegations of sexual misconduct by Oxfam staff ==
In February 2018 an investigation by The Times newspaper found that Oxfam allowed three men to resign and sacked four for gross misconduct after an inquiry concerning sexual exploitation, the downloading of pornography, bullying and intimidation. A confidential report produced by Oxfam in 2011 found that there had been “a culture of impunity” among some staff in Haiti and concluded that 'it cannot be ruled out that any of the prostitutes were under-aged'. Among the staff who were permitted to resign was the charity's Belgian country director, Roland Van Hauwermeiren. According to the internal report, Van Hauwermeiren admitted using prostitutes at a villa whose rent was paid for by Oxfam with charitable funds. Oxfam's chief executive at the time, Dame Barbara Stocking, offered Hauwermeiren “a phased and dignified exit” because of concern that sacking him risked “potentially serious implications” for the charity's work and reputation.

A few days after The Times published its revelations, it emerged that Oxfam had been aware of allegations that, while serving as director of the organisation's relief operation in Chad in 2006, Van Hauwermeiren and other staff had repeatedly made use of prostitutes at the Oxfam team house there, and that one of Oxfam's staff members had been fired for his behaviour. In the wake of these revelations, Oxfam's deputy chief executive Penny Lawrence resigned, taking full responsibility and acknowledging that "(c)oncerns were raised about the behaviour of staff in Chad as well as Haiti that we failed to adequately act upon". New allegations were made by a senior staffer, Helen Evans, who had been the lead investigator of organizational sexual misconduct between 2012 and 2015.

== HIV ==
Like many Sub-Saharan African countries, HIV is a problem in Chad. Sex workers are one of the high risk groups. Lack of understanding of the infection, low usage of condoms and poor access to healthcare contribute to an HIV prevalence rate of 20%. This figure is likely to be higher in the Lake Chad area.

== Sex trafficking ==
Chad is a source, transit, and destination country for children subjected to sex trafficking. The country's trafficking problem is primarily internal and frequently involves children being entrusted to relatives or intermediaries in return for promises of education, apprenticeship, goods, or money. Chadian girls travel to larger towns in search of work, where some are subsequently subjected to child sex trafficking or are abused in domestic servitude; child sex trafficking is also a concern among refugees and IDPs in Chad. NGOs report that the Nigerian terrorist groups Boko Haram and its offshoot Islamic State-West Africa are involved in child trafficking. In the Lake Chad area, since May 2015, attacks by Boko Haram and concurrent government military operations increased the number of IDPs, a population vulnerable to trafficking, to 76,225.

In 2015, authorities arrested the police commissioner of the city of Kelo on suspicion of involvement in child trafficking; however, after initial investigation for kidnapping, officials released the suspect from custody and, while the case remained open, it was unknown whether officials continued to actively investigate the charge. In 2016, the Chadian National Police Child Protective Services (Brigade des Mineurs) continued to investigate child abuse and exploitation, including trafficking. NGOs reported of some local officials’ complicity in trafficking during 2016.

The United States Department of State Office to Monitor and Combat Trafficking in Persons ranks Chad as a "Tier 2 Watch List" country.
