= 2010 Vatican employee sex scandal =

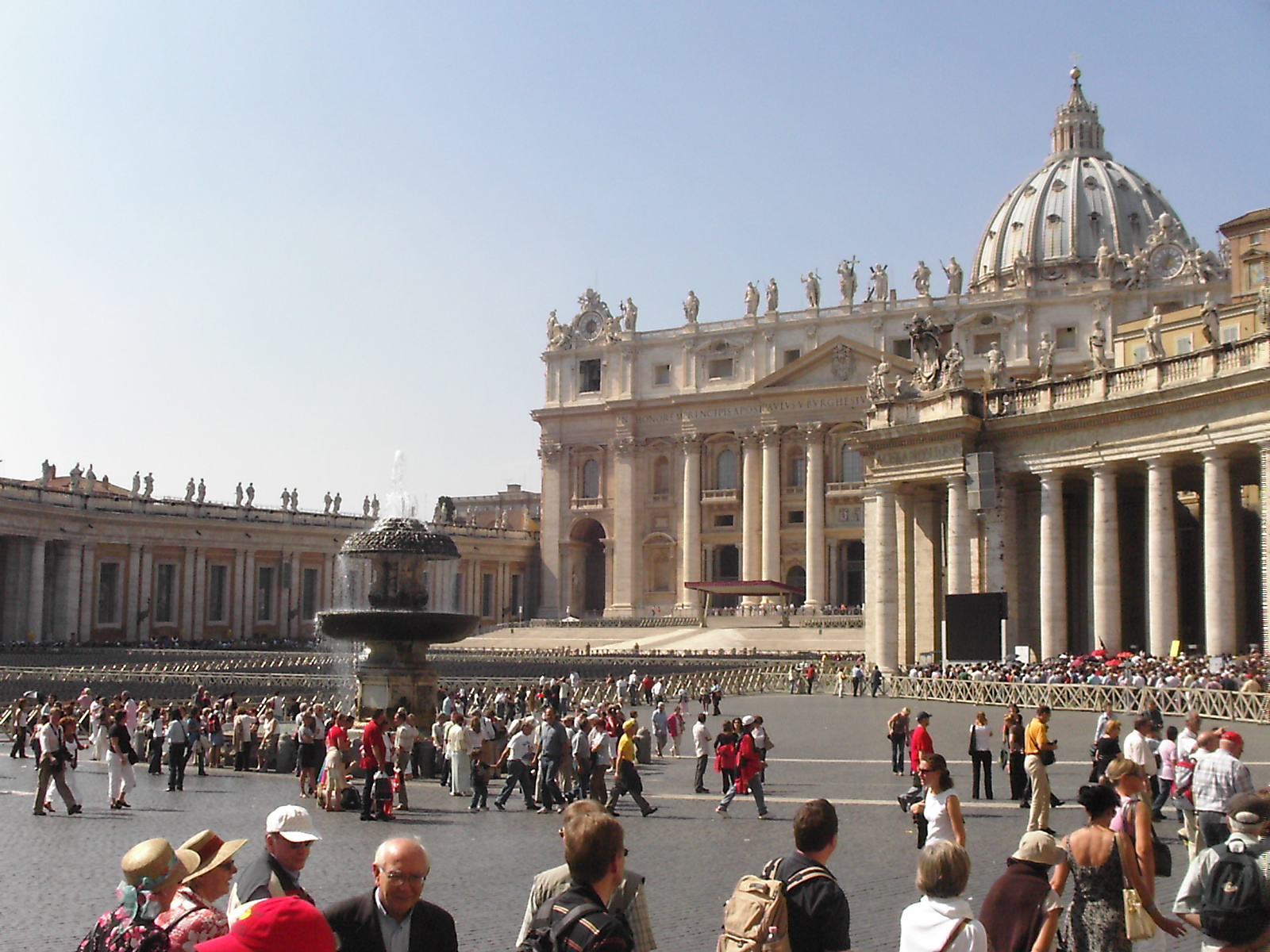
Saint Peter's Square, Vatican City

The 2010 Vatican employee sex scandal was an incident in March 2010 in which two part-time employees of the Holy See, a consultant who also served as a lay attendant of the pope and another who was a professional member of the Saint Peter's Choir, were reported in the press to be part of a homosexual male prostitution ring. The Catholic Church considers prostitution and homosexual acts to be gravely sinful offenses and the Vatican severed its connections with both men, one of whom had been arrested.

== Incident ==
Italian engineering executive Angelo Balducci was reportedly involved with pimping a Nigerian Cappella Giulia member, Thomas Chinedu Ehiem, for the services of male prostitutes as part of a local prostitution ring. Balducci had been a Papal Gentleman since 1995 and had served as senior adviser to the Congregation for the Evangelization of Peoples, responsible for the management of the Roman Catholic church's missionary activities around the globe. Ehiem had met Balducci more than 10 years before the scandal and had become acquainted with him through an Italian friend. A wiretap by police allegedly caught Balducci negotiating with Ehiem, a then 29-year-old Vatican chorister, with Balducci giving physical descriptions of men he wanted brought to him. One of the men was described as "two metres tall ... 97 kilos ... aged 33, completely active." In various taped conservations, Ehiem had also been recorded saying "I have a situation from Naples", "I have a situation from Cuba", "a German who just arrived from Germany", "two black guys", "the soccer player" and "the dancer for the RAI".

== Investigation and response ==
In March 2010, this escalated into a national scandal in Italy when wiretaps and police documents were published in the Italian newspaper La Repubblica which indicated that Ehiem had been in regular contact with Balducci, and that the main subject of their conversation was "gay sex". Ehiem reportedly said about Balducci, "He asked me if I could procure other men for him. He told me he was married and that I had to do it in great secrecy." A report by the Italian Police investigating the affair for prosecutors in Florence concluded about Balducci's life: "In order to organise casual encounters of a sexual nature, he availed himself of the intercession of two individuals who, it is maintained, may form part of an organised network, especially active in [Rome], of exploiters or at least facilitators of male prostitution."

Balducci was one of four men arrested for alleged involvement in the prostitution racket and hired lawyer Franco Coppi. Balducci had been earlier arrested on 10 February 2010, suspected of "involvement in widespread corruption", "an organised network ... to abet male prostitution". Balducci's lawyer Coppi stated that it was a "shameful" act for newspapers to publish conversations which were unrelated to the investigation and stated that he and Balducci had "laughed" when they heard of the allegations. Ehiem was dismissed from the choir after having been a member for 19 years. He accused the magistrates of "ruining his life". CBS News consultant Father Thomas Williams stated that the Vatican had severed its ties with both men and described the situation as "really a sordid affair". He said:

You do the best you can to screen these people. But there are 150 of these men that serve as ushers as Gentlemen to His Holiness. And it's hard to know exactly what they're doing in their private lives. They don't live in Vatican City, they have their jobs and their families, and they have other things going on, as well.

== See also ==
- Index of Vatican City-related articles
- In the Closet of the Vatican
