= Prostitution in Portugal =

Prostitution in Portugal is legal, but it is illegal for a third party to profit from, promote, encourage or facilitate the prostitution of another. Consequently, organized prostitution (brothels, prostitution rings or other forms of pimping) is prohibited.

Although the number of workers involved in the industry is notoriously difficult to estimate, in the mid-2000s, the number of female prostitutes was estimated at 28,000, of whom at least 50% were foreigners.

== Legal framework ==
The legal status of prostitution in Portugal has changed several times. In 1949, a harsh law dealing with sexually transmitted diseases came into effect, placing further restrictions on the registration of workers and forbidding the opening of any new houses. Existing houses could be closed if thought to provide a threat to public health. An inquiry at the time estimated that there were 5,276 workers and 485 houses, and appeared confined to the major urban areas of Lisbon, Porto, Coimbra and Evora. However, it was recognised that registered workers represented only a portion of the total population. This law was intended to eradicate prostitution.

In 1963, prostitution became illegal. At that time, brothels and other premises were closed. This was an abolitionist position ending the prior era of regulation, including regular medical checks on sex workers. The law had little effect on the extent of prostitution, and on January 1, 1983, this law was partially repealed, making not sex work itself but merely its exploitation and facilitation illegal. Prosecution was still possible under offences against public decency and morals, but this was infrequent, although regulation was in the hands of local authorities and enforcement was variable. Thus, this could be considered as an example of 'toleration'. Male prostitution has never been recognized.

Further amendments occurred in 1995 and 1998. The Code was most recently amended in 2001, specifically to deal with increasing concerns around child prostitution and human trafficking. According to a Portuguese Government spokesperson, "The Government's opinion was that prostitution was not a crime. Neither were the prostitutes' clients considered to be criminals, but those who exploited prostitutes and gained profits from their activities were considered criminals under the law." In its 2005 review of European legislation, the European Parliament report categorised Portugal as 'abolitionist'. That is to say that neither indoor nor outdoor work are either prohibited nor regulated, but nevertheless there are restrictions on working conditions which arise from custom, not law, but are enforced by police. There are areas in which outdoor sex workers cannot work, and restrictions on where they may work indoors. For instance, one cannot rent an apartment to a sex worker. The law technically only applies to third parties, not workers or clients, addressing pimping, procuring and facilitating.

Article 170 (Lenocínio, Living off Immoral Earnings) of the Penal Code reads:

1 - Who, professionally or for profit, promotes, encourages or facilitates the practice by another person of prostitution or sexual acts of relief shall be punished with imprisonment from 6 months to 5 years.

2 - If the agent uses violence, serious threat, deception, fraud, abuse of authority resulting from a hierarchical relationship of dependence, economic or work, or takes advantage of mental incapacity of the victim or any other situation of particular vulnerability, they shall be punished with imprisonment of 1 to 8 years.

Several other prostitution-related activities are widely disapproved of and prohibited, such as human trafficking, and child prostitution.

== Settings ==
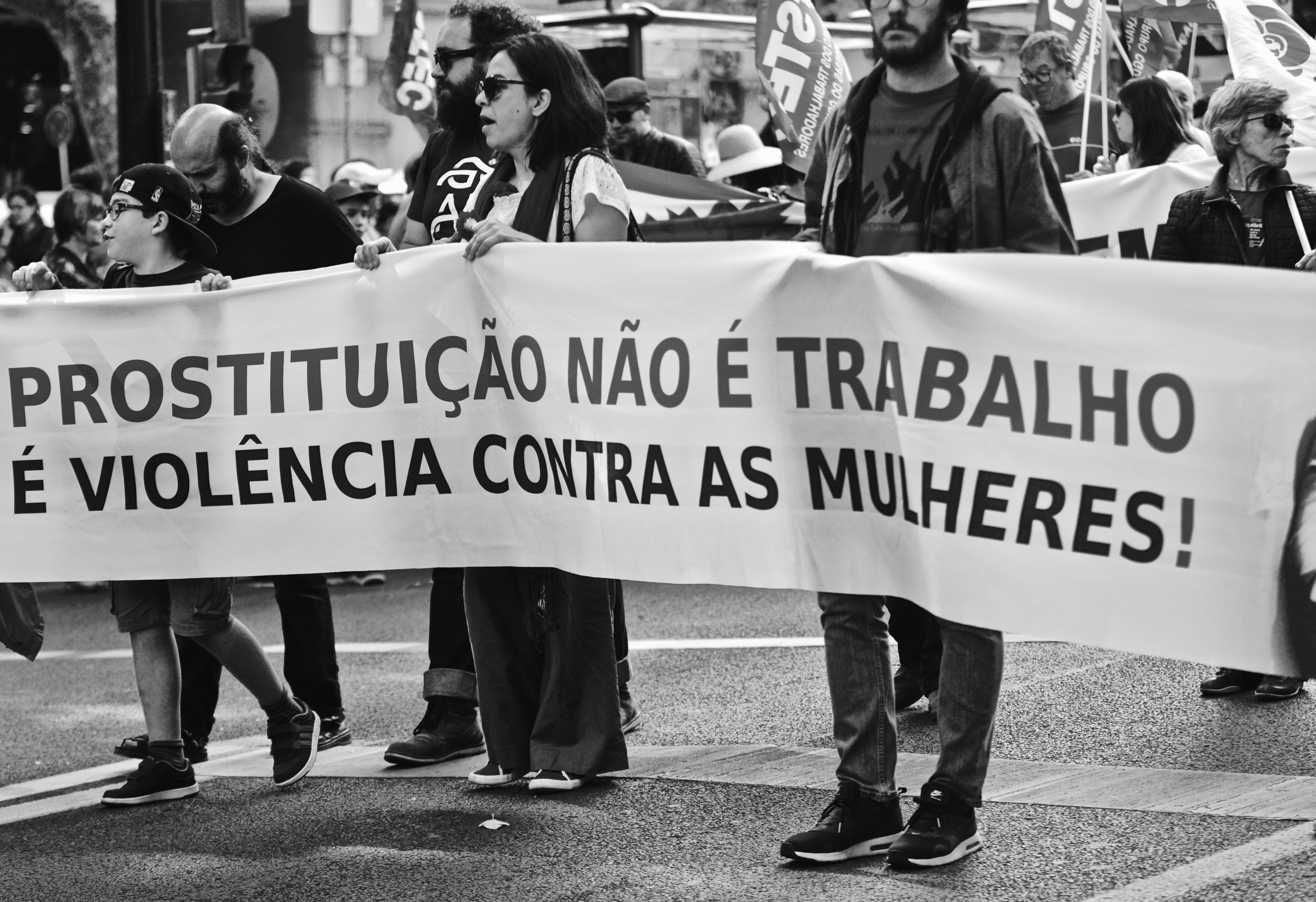
Anti-prostitution demonstration in Portugal.

In Portugal, prostitution occurs in various settings. In street prostitution, the prostitute solicits customers while waiting at street corners or walking alongside a street. Prostitution occurs in some massage parlors, bars and pubs. There are "unofficial" brothels which are establishments specifically dedicated to prostitution, but disguised as discos, hostels or restaurants. There is a form of prostitution often sheltered under the umbrella of escort agencies, who supply attractive escorts for social occasions; these escorts provide additional sexual services for the clients. Expensive and young prostitutes that advertise on the web and in the news stands can be easily found in the major cities and most crowded tourist resorts. Prostitution can also take place in the prostitute's apartment which may be located anywhere, from the suburban areas to expensive flats in the main town centers. Prostitution services' contacts are easily found in many magazines, newspapers and websites.

Both heterosexual and homosexual male prostitution also occurs in various settings, ranging from gay bars to discos and beach resorts. A large share of the males engaged in prostitution in Portugal are also foreigners, especially from Brazil and Africa. The concept of gigolo is used and is usually linked to male prostitutes with an exclusively female clientele. Most big cities have an area where homosexual male prostitutes regularly make themselves available to male potential clients cruising by in cars.

Lisbon's Edward VII Park reached notability for all kinds of prostitution, including homosexual and underage prostitution, as well as the Monsanto Forest Park, usually by nighttime.

Transsexual and transgender prostitution also exists, particularly of Brazilian travestis, namely at street level in certain designated areas (for example the Conde Redondo area in Lisbon), but also through web venues.

Increasingly one of the main venues for communication of prostitution in Portugal, as with other countries, is the Internet.

=== Madeira ===
Street prostitution occurs in the streets around 'La Vie Funchal Shopping Centre' in Funchal.

== Customers ==
Like in other conservative countries where female premarital sex was frowned upon, it was a tradition in Portugal, before the 1970s, for a young man to initiate his sexual life with a prostitute, sometimes with the father guiding that visit. This was in spite of the fact that most Portuguese people are Roman Catholic Christians, for whom premarital sex is not permitted. Today most men initiate their sexual life at a younger age than in the past, and usually in the context of a relationship, rather than with a prostitute.

== History ==
In the 19th century prostitution was largely contained in well known Bohemian neighbourhoods such as Bairro Alto, Alfama, and Mouraria. From 1853 onward, municipal laws introduced the system of regulatory prostitution, with medical controls of prostitutes to control the spread of veneral disease and restriction of the movement of sex workers to separate them from other women and keep prostitution out of public sight.

From the 1920s the right wing dictatorship officially condemned prositutiton due to its religious ideology, but in practical policy considered it necessary in order to protect non-prostitute women from sexual abuse, and upheld a strict control system with registration of sex workers and brothels. When the Portuguese women's movement organized and made international contact in the early 20th century, the Liga Portuguesa Abolicionista was founded in collaboration of the International Abolitionist Federation to campaign for an abolition of the regulatory prostitution system grew. The reform law of 1949 was introduce to gradually abolish the regulatory system, since it introduced stricter regulation of brothels and banned the registration of any new sex workers, which would eventually end with a ban of prostitution in 1963.

=== 21st century ===
Prostitution become much more visible since the early 1990s, with a migratory wave from Brazil and Eastern European countries. However these claims have been disputed. Press sources suggest that half of the women engaged in prostitution in Portugal are foreigners, especially from Brazil and Eastern Europe (Ukraine, Russia, Romania, Moldova and Bulgaria), but also from Africa and some Asian countries.

Human trafficking, including trafficking of underage persons, has also become a growing issue for the authorities. Under the Portuguese penal code, trafficking in women is a crime punishable by two to eight years' imprisonment. Although the number of workers involved in the industry is notoriously difficult to estimate, in the mid-2000s, the number of female prostitutes was estimated at 28,000, of whom at least 50% were foreigners. Resident groups continue to complain about what they see as an increase in visible prostitution.

As in most other European countries, opinions on sex work and its regulation are sharply divided. For instance a representative to the 2002 UN Committee on Elimination of Discrimination against Women stated that "there was no such thing as voluntary prostitution. About 90 per cent of prostitutes who had participated in a recent study had said that they wanted to change their lives. In many cases, the subject of prostitution was not a subject of women’s choice, but of violence and trafficking in people." Ethnographical research on street prostitution, done by Alexandra Oliveira, of University of Porto has led the researcher to argue that prostitution should be legalized to improve the situation of the women.

=== Portuguese colonies ===
During the 19th century Portuguese prostitutes have operated in Macau. Some Portuguese prostitutes also married Chinese triad members from Macau, before it returned to China, providing them with access to Portuguese citizenship.

== Sex trafficking ==
Portugal is a destination and transit country for women and children subjected to sex trafficking. Trafficking victims primarily originate from West Africa, Eastern Europe, Asia, and Latin America. Authorities report traffickers bring women and children, many from West Africa, to Portugal to claim asylum and obtain false documents before bringing them to other European countries to be exploited in sex trafficking. Portugal is being used as a new route into the Schengen area by Sub-Saharan African criminal networks trafficking children for both sexual exploitation and forced labor.

The United States Department of State Office to Monitor and Combat Trafficking in Persons ranks Portugal as a 'Tier 1' country.
