= Prostitution in Oceania =

- Decriminalization - No criminal penalties Legalization - Legal and regulated Abolitionism - Prostitution is legal, but organized activities such as brothels and pimping are illegal; prostitution is not regulated Neo-abolitionism - Illegal to buy sex and for 3rd party involvement, legal to sell sex Prohibitionism - Prostitution illegal Legality varies with local laws

Prostitution in Oceania varies greatly across the region. In American Samoa, for instance, prostitution is illegal, whereas in New Zealand most aspects of the trade are legal.

== Australia and New Zealand ==
Australia
- Prostitution legal and regulated & buying sex is legal.
- Australian Capital Territory: Brothels regulated Agencies regulated Solicitation illegal
- New South Wales: Brothels regulated Solicitation restricted
- Northern Territory: Agencies regulated Brothels illegal Solicitation illegal
- Queensland: Brothels regulated Solicitation illegal
- South Australia: Brothels illegal Solicitation illegal
- Tasmania: Brothels illegal Solicitation illegal
- Victoria: Prostitution regulated Brothels regulated Agencies regulated Solicitation illegal
- Western Australia: Brothels illegal Solicitation illegal

=== Australia ===
Prostitution in Australia is governed by state and territory laws, which vary considerably; child prostitution, sex trafficking and sex slavery are prohibited by Federal legislation throughout Australia, and of Australian citizens and residents outside of the country. The territories laws on escort services and brothels vary.

The most liberal regime is in New South Wales. It has been used as a model for other jurisdictions such as New Zealand.

The legal situation in the various states are:

- Australian Capital Territory - Prostitution is legal and regulated, as are brothels and escort agencies. Solicitation is illegal and condoms are mandatory.
- New South Wales - Prostitution is legal and regulated. Brothels need to be registered and are regulated. Soliciting is restricted with certain areas, such as near schools and churches, prohibited.
- Northern Territory - Prostitution is legal. Escort agencies are legal and regulated. Solicitation and brothels are illegal.
- Queensland - Prostitution is legal. Brothels are legal and regulated. Solicitation is illegal. Condoms are mandatory.
- South Australia - Prostitution is legal but related activities such as procuring, living off the earnings of prostitution, keeping a brothel and solicitation are illegal.
- Tasmania - Prostitution is legal. Solicitation and brothels are illegal. Condoms are mandatory.
- Victoria - Prostitution is legal and regulated, as are brothels and escort agencies. Solicitation is illegal. Condoms are mandatory.
- Western Australia - Prostitution is legal, but solicitation, living off the earnings of prostitution and brothel keeping are outlawed. The use of condoms is mandatory.

=== Cocos (Keeling) Islands ===
Cocos (Keeling) Islands
- Prostitution legal Buying sex legal Brothels illegal Solicitation illegal Condoms mandatory

Cocos (Keeling) Islands were, like Christmas Island, a British colony and part of the Colony of Singapore. After transfer of sovereignty to Australia in 1955, Singapore's colonial law was still in force on the islands until 1992. The Territories Law Reform Act 1992 made Australian federal law and the state laws of Western Australia applicable to the islands.

Prostitution is legal, but solicitation, living off the earnings of prostitution and brothel keeping are outlawed. The use of condoms is mandatory.

=== Christmas Island ===
Christmas Island
- Prostitution legal Buying sex legal Brothels illegal Solicitation illegal Condoms mandatory

Christmas Island is a former British colony, which was administered as part of the Colony of Singapore. The laws of Singapore, including prostitution law, were based on British law. in 1958, the sovereignty of the island was transferred to Australia. The "laws of the Colony of Singapore" continued to be the law of the territory. The Territories Law Reform Act 1992 decreed that Australian federal law and the state laws of Western Australia be applicable to the Indian Ocean Territories, of which Christmas Island is a part.

Prostitution is legal, but solicitation, living off the earnings of prostitution and brothel keeping are outlawed. The use of condoms is mandatory.

=== Norfolk Island ===
Norfolk Island
- Prostitution legal & regulated Brothels legal & regulated Solicitation restricted

Previously a self-governing Australian territory, the Norfolk Island Applied Laws Ordinance 2016 applied Australian federal law and the state laws of New South Wales to Norfolk Island.

Prostitution is legal and regulated. Brothels need to registered and are regulated. Soliciting is restricted with certain areas, such as near schools and churches, prohibited.

=== New Zealand ===
New Zealand
- Prostitution legal Buying sex legal Brothels regulated Solicitation legal Condoms mandatory

Although prostitution in itself had never been illegal, in 2003, the New Zealand Prostitution Reform Act legalised solicitation, brothel keeping, and other offences related to sex work. Prostitution (sex work), brothel keeping, living off the proceeds of someone else's prostitution and street solicitation are legal in New Zealand. Brothels need to be registered. The use of condoms is mandatory. Coercion of sex workers is illegal.

Often, when other countries discuss their future prostitution policy, the "New Zealand Model" is put forward as an example of decriminalisation. Now that sex work is legal, New Zealand has begun to actively work to tear down stigmas and make sex work a safe option.

== Melanesia ==
=== Fiji ===
Fiji
- Prostitution legal Buying sex legal Brothels illegal Procuring illegal Solicitation illegal

Prostitution in Fiji is legal, but most activities connected with it are illegal: brothel keeping, procuring and buying or selling sex in public. The Crimes Decree 2009 sets out the legislation regarding sex work and replaces the provisions of the earlier Penal Code. Since the new legislation there has been increased enforcement, especially towards street workers and their clients. Street workers make up the bulk of Fiji's prostitutes. Child trafficking is a problem and many foundations are urging Fiji to crack down on child trafficking.

=== New Caledonia ===
New Caledonia
- Prostitution legal Buying sex illegal Brothels illegal Procuring illegal

New Caledonia is a French overseas collectivity. Whilst it can make its own laws, it often follows the laws of mainland France. On 12 December 2016, the government added the French Law of June 2016 that criminalised the purchasers of sex to its Penal Code. Related activities such as brothel keeping and procuring have been illegal since 1946.

=== Papua New Guinea ===
Papua New Guinea
- Prostitution generally illegal Buying sex legal Brothels illegal

Prostitution is generally illegal in Papua New Guinea but widely practised and the laws rarely enforced. The Summary Offences Act 1977 makes keeping a brothel and living on the earnings of prostitution offences. The idea of the law was to decriminalise prostitution but criminalise those who sought to exploit or profit from it. In 1978, a Papua New Guinea court interpreted "living on the earnings of prostitution" to include "profit from one's own prostitution". The ruling effectively made all prostitution illegal. In a further case it was ruled that "occasional transactional sex for small amounts of money was insufficient to warrant a conviction".

=== Solomon Islands ===
Solomon Islands
- Prostitution legal Buying sex legal Brothels illegal Procuring illegal Solicitation illegal

Prostitution in the Solomon Islands is legal but related activities such as soliciting and brothel keeping are prohibited. Prostitution occurs mainly in the capital, Honiara, and around logging camps in Makira, Malaita and Isabel islands. Many of the women involved have turned to prostitution due to poverty, some starting at the age of 13. The laws are rarely enforced.

Child prostitution is a problem in the Solomon Islands, sometimes with the complicity of family members. Sex trafficking is also a problem. Women from China, Indonesia, Malaysia, and the Philippines are recruited from their home countries for legitimate work, often paying large sums of money in recruitment fees, and upon arrival are forced into prostitution.

=== Vanuatu ===
Vanuatu
- Prostitution illegal Buying sex legal

Prostitution is illegal in Vanuatu, but common, especially in the capital, Port Vila. Many women turn to prostitution because of poverty. There are estimated to be 2,000 sex workers in the country.

=== Western New Guinea ===
Western New Guinea
- No prostitution laws

Western New Guinea is the only Indonesian region to be situated in Oceania. Prostitution in Indonesia is legally considered a "crime against decency/morality", although it is widely practised, tolerated and even regulated in some areas. Since the Indonesian handover of the Dutch overseas territory of Netherlands New Guinea in 1961 there has been a high military presence in the province. This has fuelled to demand for prostitution, as have the workers from the gold and copper mines. There is evidence that prostitution in the province is run by the Indonesian Army (TNI-AD). The province has the highest prevalence of HIV/AIDS in the country.

== Micronesia ==
=== Federated States of Micronesia ===
Federated States of Micronesia
- Yap & Kosrae: Prostitution legal Buying sex legal Brothels legal Solicitation legal
- Chuuk & Pohnpei: Prostitution illegal Buying sex illegal Brothels illegal Solicitation illegal

The legality of prostitution in the Federated States of Micronesia varies from state to state. Prostitution is legal in Yap and Kosrae but illegal in Chuuk and Pohnpei. Purchasing sex, soliciting and operation of organised premises for the purposes of prostitution are also offences in Chuuk and Pohnpei. UNAIDS estimate there to be 290 prostitutes in the Federation.

The country is a source, transit and, to a lesser extent, destination country for women and children subjected to sex trafficking. The groups most vulnerable to trafficking in FSM include foreign migrant workers, especially from the Philippines, and Micronesian women in prostitution. Women and girls are allegedly exploited in prostitution (child sex trafficking for girls) by the crew members of docked Asian fishing vessels and by foreign construction workers. FSM women recruited with promises of well-paying jobs in the United States and its territories are subsequently forced into prostitution upon arrival. Local authorities claim many sex trafficking cases are unreported due to social stigma and victims’ fear of possible repercussions in their home communities.

=== Guam ===
Guam
- Prostitution illegal Buying sex illegal Brothels illegal Procuring illegal Solicitation illegal

Prostitution is illegal in Guam but is practised covertly, especially in massage parlours. Chapter 28 (Public Indecency) of the Guam Crimes and Correctional Code outlaws prostitution as well as soliciting, compelling, promoting or abetting prostitution. The latter includes using the services of a prostitute. Although massage parlours are sometimes raided, generally the authorities turn a blind eye. The Department of Public Health and Social Services mandates STI testing massage parlour workers There have been ongoing discussions about establishing a red-light district since 2006.

During the Japanese occupation of Guam in WW2, some local Chamorro women were forced to work in the Japanese military brothels set up on the island (I Tiempon Chapones) along with the Japanese and Korean woman the Japanese had brought there. After the American liberation of Guam, a number of brothels were set up to serve the American servicemen.

=== Kiribati ===
Kiribati
- Prostitution legal Buying sex legal Brothels illegal Procuring illegal

Prostitution in Kiribati is legal but related activities such as keeping a brothel are illegal. UNAIDS estimate there to be 114 prostitutes on the islands.

Prostitution centres around the fishing industry in the capital, Tarawa. The waters around Kiribati are some of the richest fishing grounds in the world. Many international fishing boats, predominantly South Korean, anchor off Tarawa and young women, some as young as 14, are transported to the fishing boats by smaller craft or by the boats that unload the fish from fishing boats. The prostitutes are known as "KoreKorea".

In an attempt to stop this trade, the government banned Korean ships from the port for a while in 2003. A two-year ban was later introduced between 2003 and 2005.

=== Marshall Islands ===
Marshall Islands
- Prostitution illegal Buying sex illegal Brothels illegal Procuring illegal Solicitation illegal

Prostitution in the Marshall Islands is illegal following the Prostitution Prohibition Act of 2001. This includes the buying and selling of sex, and also third party involvement Victims of trafficking are protected under law.

Chinese prostitutes usually fly from China to the Marshall Islands via Fiji and Kiribati. Seamen from Japan, South Korea and Taiwan are the most frequent visitors to the Chinese prostitutes. Prostitution normally takes place on Japanese, South Korean or Taiwanese fishing boats moored in the lagoons. There are some Chinese prostitutes in the country who charge more than the local prostitutes. Because of the higher price their customers tend to be the officers on the fishing boats. In 2016 it was estimated there were 250 prostitutes on Majuro Atoll.

The Republic of the Marshall Islands (RMI) is a source and destination country for RMI women and children and a destination for women from East Asia subjected to sex trafficking. RMI girls are recruited by foreign business owners and are subjected to sex trafficking with crew members of foreign fishing and transshipping vessels that dock in Majuro.

=== Nauru ===
Nauru
- Prostitution legal Buying sex legal Brothels illegal

Prostitution in Nauru is legal, but brothels are prohibited by article 231 of the Criminal Code.

In 2015 it was reported that security guards in the Australian run Nauru Regional Processing Centre had allegedly circulated videos of themselves having sex with asylum seekers in exchange for money and cannabis. Charlotte Wilson, a Save the Children case manager, said "I was told that because prostitution is legal on Nauru that no action was being taken against the staff members involved." Relatedly, a review into sexual abuse in the detention centre found that there were many reported and unreported alleged sexual assaults and rapes of detainees, some of which were minors.

=== Northern Mariana Islands ===
Northern Mariana Islands
- Prostitution illegal Buying sex illegal Brothels illegal Procuring illegal Solicitation illegal

Prostitution in the Northern Mariana Islands is illegal but widely practised. Sections 1341–1350 of the Commonwealth Code criminalises the buyers and sellers of sex and also those who profit from the prostitution of others.

Many of the prostitutes are Chinese or Filipino, having first come to the islands to work in the garment factories which subsequently closed. There were estimated to be 1,500 prostitutes on the islands in 2006, most in the red-light district of Garapan on Saipan.

During the Japanese occupation of the islands in WW1, military brothels were set up and native women forced to work in them. Korean women were used as comfort women in the brothels on the island in WW2.

=== Palau ===
Palau
- Prostitution illegal Buying sex illegal Solicitation illegal

Prostitution and related activities are illegal in Palau. The Anti-Prostitution Act criminalises prostitution, advancing or profiting from prostitution, soliciting and purchasing of sex.

Some illegal prostitution occurs in karaoke bars, massage parlours, and bars. The prostitutes are mainly Chinese & Filipino. This trade has declined since the shutting of the military bases. In January 2014, Peleliu governor Temmy Shmull was charged with soliciting prostitutes at a karaoke bar in Koror.

Palau is a destination country for women subjected to sex trafficking and for women. Women from China and the Philippines are recruited to work in Palau as waitresses or clerks, but some are subsequently forced into prostitution in karaoke bars or massage parlours, many operated by Taiwanese, Filipino, or Palauan nationals.

== Polynesia ==
=== American Samoa ===
American Samoa
- Prostitution illegal Buying sex illegal Brothels illegal Procuring illegal Solicitation illegal

Prostitution in American Samoa is illegal, as are related activities such as brothel keeping and procuring. These acts are punishable by law, including a fine of more than $500 or a jail sentence of up to a year for customers of prostitution.

W. Somerset Maugham's short story Rain about a missionary trying to get a prostitute to give up her ways is based on Maugham's visit to American Samoa's capital Pago Pago in 1916.

=== Cook Islands ===
Cook Islands
- Prostitution legal Buying sex legal Brothels illegal Solicitation illegal

Prostitution is legal in the Cook Islands, but related activities of procuring, living of the earnings of prostitution, brothel keeping and solicitation are illegal.

There is no evidence of trafficking or sexual exploitation on the islands.

=== Easter Island ===
Easter Island
- Prostitution regulated Buying sex legal Procuring illegal Brothels illegal

When the first European, Dutch navigator Jacob Roggeveen, visited Easter Island in 1722, he found the Rapa Nui practised prostitution. Men outnumbered women, and some women remained unmarried to service the single men. European and American sailors used the services of the native girls when anchored at the island.

Apart from a few island specific laws, the law of Chile is in force. Prostitution is legal and regulated. Brothels and procuring are illegal.

=== French Polynesia ===
French Polynesia
- Prostitution legal Brothels illegal

Prostitution in French Polynesia is legal, while brothels are not. In French Polynesia's capital, Papeete, it was estimated that there were about 100 prostitutes working the streets in 2012. Of these 30% were female, 20% male and 50% transsexual (known as "raerae").

=== Hawaii ===
Hawaii
- Prostitution illegal Buying sex illegal Brothels illegal Procuring illegal Solicitation illegal

Prostitution in Hawaii is illegal under Hawaii Revised Statutes section 712-1200. Both the buying and selling of sex, and also related activities such as soliciting, promoting prostitution and allowing premises to be used for prostitution, are prohibited. The penalty is a fine of up to $500 and/or up to 30 days imprisonment.

It was legal for Law Enforcement Officers to have sex with prostitutes if they were "collecting evidence" of prostitution. A new law in 2014 outlawed this practice.

In May 2015, a dozen Honolulu sex-workers were arrested during raids on massage parlours. Rather than being charged with prostitution they were charged with sexual assault, which carries far heavier penalties. When they were offering sex they touched the undercover officers genitals. Bill Johnson of the National Association of Police Organisations said the change of Honolulu Police's tactics could be a way of adapting to prostitutes becoming aware of how undercover officers make arrests.

A Bill was put before Hawaii's state government in January 2017, with the intent of decriminalising prostitution. On the second reading it was referred to the "House Committee on Judiciary" for further investigation and the case was adjourned sine die.

=== Niue ===
Niue
- Prostitution illegal Buying sex legal Brothels illegal

It is an offence to be the keeper of a brothel in Niue (section 175 of the Niue Act 1966), as is being a prostitute (section 220).

=== Pitcairn Islands ===
Pitcairn Islands
- No adult prostitution laws

Apart from involvement in child prostitution, there are no prostitution laws on the Pitcairn Islands.

The population of the islands is estimated at 50. However in the late 1930s, when the population reached its highest of 250, the pastor of the island complained to the High Commissioner that prostitution on the islands was "very common."

=== Samoa ===
Samoa
- Prostitution illegal Buying sex legal Brothels illegal Procuring illegal Solicitation illegal

Prostitution is illegal in Samoa under the Crimes Act 2013. Samoan law also prohibits anyone from living on the earnings of a prostitute, for which the maximum penalty is ten years' imprisonment. Procuring and brothelkeeping are also illegal, with the latter subject to a maximum of ten years' imprisonment. In 2009, an investigation by the Samoan Observer newspaper identified that prostitution was taking place on the islands. A study carried out in 2016 by the United Nations Development Programme, UNICEF and the University of New South Wales indicated that there were approximately 400 female sex workers in Samoa, serving local and foreign clients. The primary reason for women doing sex work was economic. In February 2017, Samoa Police prepared to launch an investigation into a foreign-owned business alleged to be using local women in a prostitution operation. In the same year the Ministry of Health put forward plans to offer counselling and educational services to sex workers.

=== Tokelau ===
Tokelau
- No known prostitution Solicitation illegal

No known prostitution occurs on Tokelau. When the Council of Elders were consulted during the drafting the Tokelau Amendment Act 1970, the concept of prostitution had to be explained to them. Their only knowledge was the story of Rahab in the Old Testament.

The only law regarding prostitution is the one prohibiting soliciting.

=== Tonga ===
Tonga
- Prostitution legal Buying sex legal Brothels illegal Procuring illegal Solicitation illegal

Prostitution is legal in Tonga but related activities such as soliciting and brothel keeping are forbidden under the Criminal Offences Act. There are an estimated 1,000 sex workers in the country.

Tonga is a destination country for women subjected to sex trafficking and, to a lesser extent, a source country for women and children subjected to domestic sex trafficking. East Asian women, especially those from China, are exploited in prostitution in clandestine establishments operating as legitimate businesses; some East Asian women are recruited from their home countries for legitimate work in Tonga, paying large sums of money in recruitment fees, and upon arrival are forced into prostitution.

=== Tuvalu ===
Tuvalu
- Prostitution legal Buying sex legal Brothels illegal Procuring illegal Solicitation illegal

Prostitution is legal, but living on the earnings of prostitutes, procuring, brothel keeping and solicitation are illegal under the Penal Code.

UNAIDS estimate there to be 10 prostitutes on the islands.

=== Wallis and Futuna ===
Wallis and Futuna
- Prostitution legal Buying sex illegal Brothels illegal Procuring illegal

Whilst the three kings of the islands, assisted by a prime minister and a "chefferie", have limited powers to legislate on local matters, the laws of France are applicable in Wallis and Futuna. These include the laws on prostitution, e.g. prohibition of purchasing sex, solicitation, procuring and brothels.
