= Campo Alegre (brothel) =

Open-air brothel in Curaçao

- Le Mirage
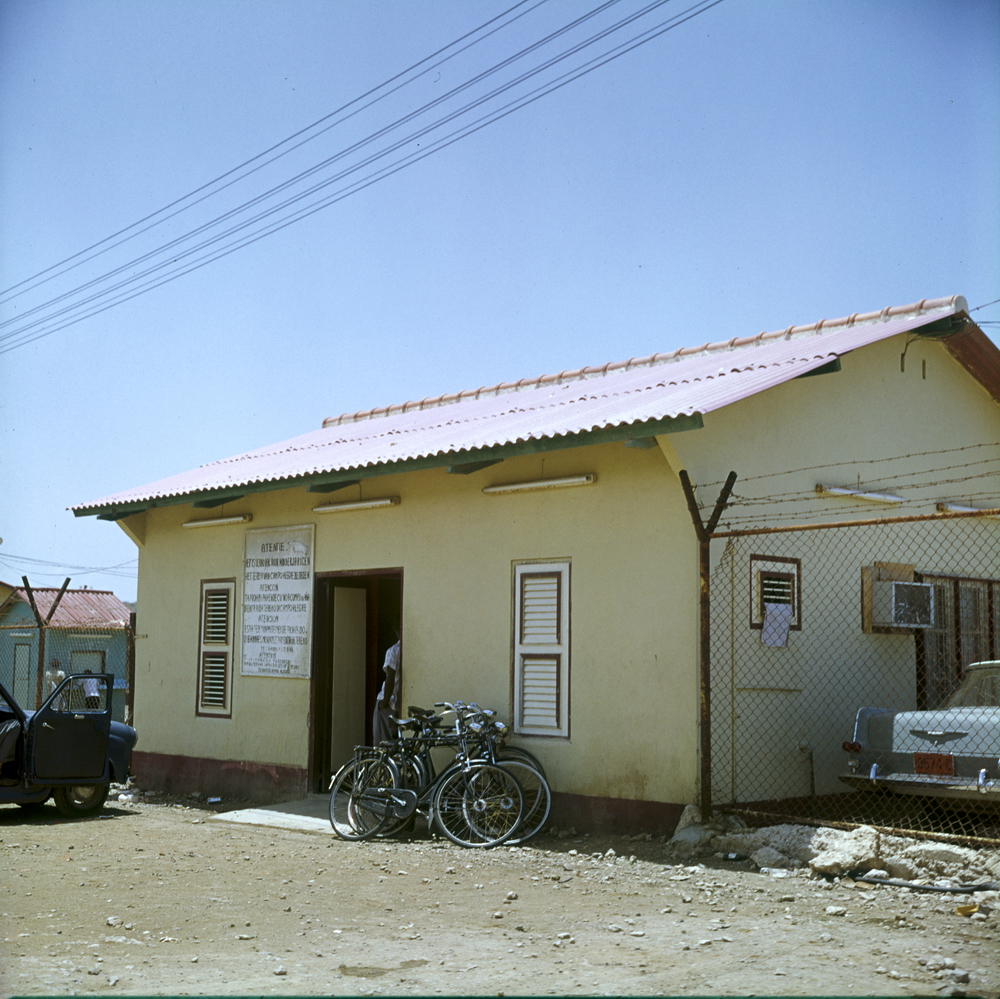
- Interactive map of Campo Alegre
- Address: Seru Fortunaweg; Curaçao
- Coordinates: 12°10′41″N 68°56′29″W

Construction
- Opened: 30 May 1949
- Closed: June 2020

Website
- campoalegresex.com

Campo Alegre, also known as Le Mirage, was a large open-air brothel in Curaçao. It has been operated since the 1940s. Originally an army encampment, it is located off Seru Fortunaweg near Curaçao International Airport. It was the largest legal brothel in the Caribbean. Curaçao, a constituent country of the Kingdom of the Netherlands, permits the business of prostitution within its territory within strict regulation. In June 2020, Campo Alegre closed. The facilities were auctioned in June 2022. Prostitution resumed within stricter legal rules.

== History ==
In the 1920s, oil refineries were opened on the island. Women migrated to the island to service the needs of the oil workers and sailors from the tankers. In the 1930s & 1940s, Venezuelan, Colombian and Dominican prostitutes operated in the town centre. The arrival of the Dutch and American navies to guard the island in the 1940s increased the demand for prostitutes. The government banned prostitution from the town centre, but this was unenforceable.

The governor appointed a commission that included the police, the public health department and the clergy with a view to solving the prostitution problem. They concluded that the best alternative was to concentrate prostitution in one location away from the town centre, The plan was for a complex of appeasements where prostitutes could work independently. On May 30, 1949, the complex named Campo Alegre (also called Le Mirage) was opened. It had the approval of the Colonial Governor with the support of the Queen of the Netherlands. Initially sex workers were recruited from Cuba and Venezuela.

Woman are issued with a 3-month visa to work in the brothel. Between the late 1940s to the mid-1990s, half of the prostitutes returned for further 3 months' work. Between 1949 and 1996, an estimated 25,000 sex workers have been employed in the establishment. In March 2020, Campo Alegre closed as a result of the COVID-19 pandemic. In June 2020, the company filed for bankruptcy. The 150 sex workers and 84 other employees are out on the street. As of 2023, the property was bought by the government of Curaçao to the surprise of the local population.

== Current operation ==
Although originally run by the government, the establishment is now privately run to government regulations.

Housed in an ex-army barracks, it has a capacity to house 300 sex workers, although normally there are about 150 women working there. Only foreign prostitutes are allowed to work there, mainly from Colombia and the Dominican Republic. The women work on a three-month visa. Regular health checks are carried out and the women have to carry a health certificate ("pink card"). The use of condoms is mandatory.

An admission charge is levied on entry. Clients negotiate a price with the sex workers, who work independently. Within the facility, which is billed as a "Gentleman's Club", is a bar, billiard tables and slot machines. In the evenings, the women put on pole dancing and striptease shows. Tuesday was Ladies' night, however unlike most ladies' nights, the price of admission doubled on Tuesday.

Many of the customers are sailors from the ships anchored in the deep-water harbour.

== See also ==
- Prostitution in the Dutch Caribbean
