= Prostitution in Romania =

Prostitution in Romania is not itself criminalized, although associated activities, such as procuring, are criminal offenses, and solicitation is a contravention punishable by fines.

Prostitution was decriminalized in 2014, as the new Penal code of Romania, which came into force on 1 February 2014, no longer contains such a criminal offense. Prior to that date, it was considered a criminal offense (infracţiune) punishable by up to a year imprisonment.

== History ==
Between 1862 and 1930, Romania practiced the "French system" of regulatonism, in which prostitution was tolerated provided that it was practiced in an authorized brothel, by prostitute women who were registered and regularly subjected to examinations for sexual diseases. Prior to the unification of Romania, this system had been introduced in the Principalities in the 1850s.

In 1930 the licenzed brothels were abolished in a reform influenced by American policy, but prostitution itself was not abolished and prostitute women were allowed to practice prostitution in their own homes. In 1943, the regulation system was temporarily reintroduced during the war, and legalized brothels reinstated. The legalized brothelse were closed by the communist regime in the late 1940s, and prostitution itself became a criminal offense in 1957.

There had been proposals in the past to legalize and regulate prostitution (such as in 2007) but these were rejected, especially as Romania is a party to the Convention for the Suppression of the Traffic in Persons and of the Exploitation of the Prostitution of Others, which states that prostitution is "incompatible with the dignity and worth of the human person and endanger[s] the welfare of the individual, the family and the community" and binds countries which ratify it to ban organized prostitution such as pandering or running a brothel. According to the official explanations of the Ministry of Justice, with regard to the new penal code "the fact that prostitution will be excluded from criminal penalties does not mean "legalizing "it, transforming the activity into one regulated or permitted by law, because the persons practicing prostitution will still be sanctioned with a contravention." The Association for the Promotion of Women in Romania opposes legalized prostitution, as they view prostitution as "another form of violence against women and girls". The Romanian Orthodox Church also opposed the legalisation.

In 2008, an EU-funded survey by TAMPEP found Romania was top country of origin of migrant sex workers in the EU.

On January 20, 2010, Iana Matei was named "European of the Year" by Reader's Digest for finding and rehabilitating victims of forced prostitution.

== Legal situation ==
Solicitation is an administrative offence (contravenție) punishable by a fine of 500–1500 lei (approximately 110–330 euros as of 2016). The National Police, Local Police and Gendarmes are all responsible for enforcing the laws, but there are reports that law enforcement is corrupt and sometimes violent.

Clients are not prosecuted, unless they knowingly use the services of a victim of forced prostitution, or the prostitute is a minor (Art. 2161)

Article 213 criminalizes procuring; it states that "The causing or facilitation of the practice of prostitution or the obtaining of financial benefits from the practice of prostitution by one or more individuals shall be punishable by no less than 2 and no more than 7 years of imprisonment and a ban on the exercise of certain rights." In certain aggravated circumstances, the punishment increases. The penal code also criminalizes several offenses against slavery, human trafficking, child trafficking, forced labour, and using exploited persons (Art. 182 Exploitation of a person, Art. 209 Slavery, Art. 210 Trafficking in human beings, Art. 211 Trafficking in underage persons, Art. 212 Pressing into forced or compulsory labor, Art. 216 Use of an exploited person’s services).

== Sex trafficking ==
There has been a growing awareness of human trafficking as a human rights issue in Europe. There was an increase in human trafficking after major changes in the structure of the Romanian government took place, with the majority of victims being women forced into prostitution. At the time, there were high unemployment rates, and the borders had been opened. However, there doesn't seem to be any evidence proving what caused the increase in human trafficking during that time. Romania is a country of origin and country of transit for persons, primarily women and children, trafficked for the purpose of sexual exploitation. The Romanian government has shown some commitment to combat trafficking but has been criticized for failing to fully comply with the minimum standards for the elimination of trafficking. Authorities opened 864 new trafficking cases in 2016 (858 in 2015), and prosecutors indicted 358 suspected traffickers in 2016 (480 in 2015). Courts convicted 472 traffickers in 2016 (331 in 2015).

Romania is a destination country for a limited number of foreign trafficking victims, including sex trafficking victims from Italy and Armenia. Government officials have been convicted of human trafficking crimes, and there have been reports of local officials obstructing trafficking investigations. The government reported two cases of official complicity in 2016. In one case, a police officer was sentenced to two years imprisonment for repeated trafficking of minors and nine months for establishing a criminal enterprise. In the other case, a judge received eight months for using the services of an exploited person and 16 months imprisonment for blackmail.

Articles 210, 211, and 367 of the penal code prohibit all forms of trafficking and prescribe penalties of three to 10 years imprisonment.

The United States Department of State Office to Monitor and Combat Trafficking in Persons ranks Romania as a 'Tier 2' country.

Romani girls are vulnerable to sex trafficking.
