= Prostitution statistics by country =

In 2012 it was estimated that there were between 40 and 42 million prostitutes in the world. The list of countries below provides an estimate for the number of people working as prostitutes in each country. China, India, and the United States are the countries with the most prostitutes in absolute numbers, as indicated in the chart below, although other countries have higher rates of prostitution.

== Methodology ==
There are a number of difficulties involved in collecting meaningful prostitution statistics. For example, the greater visibility of some forms of prostitution, such as street prostitution, makes statistics on these forms easier to collect. However, in some countries street prostitution forms a much smaller part of the sex industry than indoor prostitution. Similarly sex workers with health, addiction and other support needs are more likely to be known to the authorities and hence easier for researchers to contact, but may not be representative of prostitution as a whole. National Ugly Mugs, a support organisation for sex workers in the United Kingdom, has identified several factors making it difficult to collect statistics for the sex industry, including low response rates, the small scale of research compared to the size of the sex industry, and the diversity of the industry. As a result published statistics are often conflicting and contested.

In countries where prostitution is illegal, the use of arrest data to create general prostitution statistics can be misleading. The majority of prostitutes are never arrested, and those who are, can often be charged with other offences instead. Class bias may be introduced into the statistics as a result of police officers being more likely to arrest street prostitutes than high-class call girls. In comparing one area with another there may be differences in the definition of a crime, the police enforcement rate, and the possibility of the inflation of arrest figures or the under-reporting of crime.

Due to the unregulated and often illegal nature of the work, only estimates are available for the number of prostitutes in a country. The numbers for a country can vary considerably dependent on the source. Some countries' numbers may suffer from poor methodology. In other cases, results may be influenced by whether the organisation producing the numbers is for or against the nature of the work. Where available, figures are taken from Joint United Nations Programme on HIV/AIDS 2016 "Sex Workers: Size Estimates."

Numbers of prostitutes
Country	Number of prostitutes Source: UNAIDS 2016 - 2018 Sex Workers: Size Estimates	Number of prostitutes Other sources and year	Population	Prevalence (prostitutes per 10,000 population)
Afghanistan	12,500 (2016)		34,656,032	4
Albania	No data	5,000 – 30,000 (2006)	2,926,348	17 – 103
Algeria	No data		40,606,052	-
Angola	54,000 (2017)		28,813,463	19
Antigua and Barbuda	No data	800 (2014)	100,963	79
Argentina	74,900 (2014)		43,847,430	17
Armenia	9,000 (2018)		2,924,816	30
Australia	20,500 (2012)	20,000 (2017)	24,125,848	8
Austria	No data	30,000 (2013)	8,712,137	34
Azerbaijan	13,800 (2018)		9,725,376	14
Bahamas	3,035 (2016)		391,232	78
Bahrain	No data	13,500 (2007)	1,425,171	95
Bangladesh	140,000 (2015)		162,951,560	1
Belarus	22,000 (2016)		9,480,042	23
Belgium	No data	26,000 (2015)	11,358,379	23
Benin	28,800 (2017)		10,872,298	26
Bhutan	400 – 500 (2017)		797,765	5 – 6
Bolivia	31,000 (2016)		10,887,882	29
Bosnia and Herzegovina	4,000 (2016)		3,516,816	11
Botswana	4,200 (2016)		2,250,260	19
Brazil	1,400,000 (2013)		207,652,865	26
Bulgaria	10,000 (2016)		7,131,494	14
Burkina Faso	31,000 (2016)		18,646,433	17
Burundi	51,000 (2016)		10,524,117	49
Cambodia	34,000 (2016)		15,762,370	22
Cameroon	70,500 (2018)		23,439,189	47
Canada	No data		36,289,822	-
Cape Verde	1,400 (2016)		539,560	26
Central African Republic	782 (2016)		4,594,621	2
Chad	1,200 (2016)		14,452,543	1
Chile	No data	4,980 (2014)	17,909,754	2 – 3
China	No data	2,800,000 – 4,500,000 (2010)	1,403,500,365	14 – 32
Colombia	244,400 (2013)		48,653,419	2
Comoros	200 (2016)		795,601	3
Congo	9,700 (2017)		5,125,821	-
Costa Rica	3,000 (2017)	15,000 (unknown)	4,857,274	31
Croatia	No data	21,066 (2006)	4,213,265	50
Cuba	82,500 (2017)		11,475,982	78
Cyprus	No data		1,170,125	-
Czech Republic	13,000 (2016)		10,610,947	12
Democratic Republic of the Congo	350,300 (2018)		78,736,153	45
Denmark	No data	6,000 (2009)	5,711,870	11
Djibouti	2,900 (2016)		942,333	31
Dominican Republic	97,800 (2015)		10,648,791	56 – 94
East Timor	1,700 (2016)		1,268,671	13
Ecuador	34,400 (2014)		16,385,068	21
Egypt	23,000 (2016)		95,688,681	2
El Salvador	20,000 (2016)		6,344,722	32
Equatorial Guinea	5,800 (2016)		1,221,490	41
Eritrea	1,600 (2016)		4,954,645	3
Estonia	1,000 (2016)		1,312,442	7
Ethiopia	85,000 (2016)		102,403,196	2
Federated States of Micronesia	290 (2016)		104,937	29
Fiji	900 (2014)		898,760	10
Finland	No data	4,000 (2009)	5,503,132	7
France	No data	30,000 (2018)	64,720,690	5
Gabon	368 (2016)		1,979,786	2
Gambia	3,100 (2016)		2,038,501	15
Georgia	6,500 (2016)		3,925,405	17
Germany	No data	300,000 (2009)	81,914,672	37
Ghana	52,000 (2016)		28,206,728	18
Greece	No data	10,500 – 15,000 (2009)	11,183,716	9 – 13
Guatemala	83,000 (2019)		16,582,469	16
Guinea	8,400 (2016)		12,395,924	7
Guinea-Bissau	3,100 (2016)		1,815,698	17
Guyana	5,300 (2016)		773,303	69
Haiti	70,300 (2015)		10,847,334	65
Honduras	22,800 (2016)		9,112,867	25
Hungary	No data	20,000 – 25,000 (2006)	9,753,281	21 – 26
India	657,800 (2016)		1,324,171,354	5
Indonesia	226,800 (2016)		261,115,456	9
Iran	90,000 (2015)	91,500 (2015)	80,277,428	11
Iraq	No data		37,202,572	-
Ireland	1,000 (2016)		4,726,078	2
Israel	No data	12,000 (2015)	8,191,828	15
Italy	No data	60,000 (2009)	59,429,938	10
Ivory Coast	10,900 (2016)		23,695,919	4
Jamaica	18,700 (2014)		2,881,355	66
Japan	No data		127,748,513	-
Jordan	No data		9,455,802	-
Kazakhstan	19,000 (2016)		17,987,736	11
Kenya	167,900 (2018)		48,461,567	35
Kiribati	114 (2016)		114,395	10
Kuwait	No data		4,052,584	-
Kyrgyzstan	7,100 (2016)		5,955,734	12
Laos	13,000 (2016)		6,758,353	19
Latvia	No data	29,558 (2006)	1,970,530	150
Lebanon	4,300 (2018)		6,006,668	7
Lesotho	7,500 (2018)		2,203,821	29
Liberia	163,100 (2017)		4,613,823	2
Libya	No data		6,293,253	-
Lithuania	No data	1,000 – 3,000 (unknown)	2,908,249	3 – 10
Luxembourg	No data	300 (2009)	575,747	5
Macedonia	3,600 (2016)		2,081,206	17
Madagascar	191,200 (2018)		24,894,551	68
Malawi	9,300 (2016)		18,091,575	5
Malaysia	21,000 (2016)		31,187,265	7
Maldives	No data	1,139 (2013)	427,756	27
Mali	36,000 (2016)		17,994,837	20
Marshall Islands	250 (2016)		53,066	47
Mauritania	315 (2016)		4,301,018	1
Mauritius	6,200 (2016)		1,262,132	49
Mexico	240,000 (2019)		127,540,423	19
Moldova	12,000 (2016)		4,059,608	30
Mongolia	1,300 (2016)		3,027,398	4
Morocco	72,000 (2017)		36,276,786	21
Mozambique	27,300 (2012)		28,829,476	5
Myanmar	66,000 (2016)		52,885,223	13
Nepal	67,000 (2016)		28,982,771	23
Namibia	8,100 (2016)		2,479,713	33
Netherlands	25,000 (2011)		16,987,330	15
New Zealand	3,500 (2018)	5,932 (2005)	4,660,833	13
Nicaragua	14,800 (2017)		6,149,928	29
Niger	47,000 (2016)		20,672,987	23
Nigeria	410,000 (2019)	103,500 (2015)	185,989,640	5
North Korea	No data	25,000 (2014)	25,368,620	10
Norway	No data	3,000 (2009)	5,254,694	6
Oman	No data		4,424,762	-
Pakistan	228,800 (2016)		193,203,476	12
Palestine	No data		4,790,705	-
Panama	8,300 (2018)		4,034,119	13
Papua New Guinea	No data		8,084,991	-
Paraguay	3,400 (2016)		6,725,308	5
Peru	67,000 (2016)		31,773,839	21
Philippines	210,000 (2019)		103,320,222	15
Poland	No data	19,000 (unknown)	38,224,410	5
Portugal	No data	28,000 (2005)	10,371,627	27
Qatar	No data		2,569,804	-
Romania	No data	158,225 (2006)	19,778,083	80
Russia	No data	719,822 (2006)	143,964,513	50
Rwanda	12,000 (2016)		11,917,508	10
Samoa	400 (2016)		195,125	21
São Tomé and Príncipe	89 (2016)		199,910	5
Saudi Arabia	No data		32,275,687	-
Senegal	21,000 (2016)		15,411,614	14
Serbia	3,900 (2016)		8,820,083	4
Seychelles	586 (2016)		94,228	62
Sierra Leone	240,000 (2013)		7,396,190	325
Singapore	No data		5,622,455	-
Slovakia	No data	21,777 (2006)	5,444,218	40
Slovenia	No data	2000-3000	2,077,862	14
Somalia	11,000 (2016)		14,317,996	7
South Africa	24,000 (2018)		56,015,473	4
South Korea	No data		50,791,919	-
South Sudan	5,000 (2016)		12,230,730	4
Spain	70,300 (2016)		46,347,576	15
Sri Lanka	14,000 (2016)		20,798,492	7
Sudan	212,500 (2016)		39,578,828	53
Suriname	2,200 (2016)		558,368	39
Swaziland	4,000 (2016)		1,343,098	30
Sweden	No data	2,500 (2009)	9,837,533	3
Switzerland	20,000 (2011)		8,401,739	24
Syria	25,000 (2011)		18,430,453	14
Taiwan	No data	100,000 (2011)	23,556,706	43
Tajikistan	14,000 (2016)		8,734,951	16
Tanzania	160,000 (2016)		55,572,201	29
Thailand	144,000 (2016)		68,863,514	20
Togo	10,000 (2016)		7,606,374	13
Tonga	1,000 (2016)		107,122	93
Tunisia	25,000 (2011)		11,403,248	22
Turkey	No data	100,000+ (2016)	79,512,426	13+
Turkmenistan	No data	5,663 (2006)	5,662,544	10
Tuvalu	10 (2016)		11,097	9
Trinidad and Tobago	1000 (2016)		1,353,895	7.3
Uganda	130,000 (2019)		41,487,965	-
Ukraine	86,600 (2016)		44,438,625	18
United Arab Emirates	No data	30,000 (unknown)	9,269,612	32
United Kingdom	No data	72,800 (2016)	65,788,574	11
United States	No data	1,000,000 – 2,000,000 (2010)	322,179,605	31
Uruguay	8,200 (2016)		3,444,006	24
Uzbekistan	22,000 (2016)		31,446,795	7
Vanuatu	2,000 (2016)		270,402	74
Venezuela	No data	473,523 (2006)	31,568,179	150
Vietnam	86,000 (2019)		94,569,072	7
Yemen	54,000 (2016)		27,584,213	20
Zambia	9,300 (2016)		16,591,390	6
Zimbabwe	No data	12,383 (2013)	16,150,362	8

== Purchase of prostitution ==
Country	Lifetime prevalence (men)
Brazil	56% (2010)
Cambodia	82.5% (2018)
Chile	23% (2010)
China	9.1% (2000)
Croatia	12% (2010)
Denmark	13.1% (1992)
Ethiopia	5.6% (2016)
Germany	26.9% (2019)
India	27% (2010)
Japan	48.3% (2022)
Mexico	18% (2010)
Norway	12.9% (2002)
Poland	13% (2026)
Russia	23.9% (2014)
Rwanda	16% (2010)
South Africa	18% (2012)
South Korea	42.1% (2019)
Spain	25.4% (2003)
Sweden	9.5% (2017)
Switzerland	16.7% (2002)
Taiwan	19% (2002)
Thailand	34% (2006)
United Kingdom	9% (2024)
United States	9.1% (2012)

== See also ==
- Decriminalization of sex work
