= Prostitution in Overseas France =

Prostitution in Overseas France varies from area to area with regard to extent, law enforcement and legality.

Overseas France (French: France d'outre-mer) consists of all the French-administered territories outside Continental Europe. These territories have varying legal status and different levels of autonomy. Almost all inhabited French administrative divisions outside Europe are classified as either overseas regions or overseas collectivites. There is also one Overseas territory and two territories with Special status.

== Overseas regions ==
Overseas regions have identical status to regions in metropolitan France and French law is in force. Selling sex is legal, but related activities such as solicitation and brothel keeping are illegal. On 6 April 2016, the French National Assembly voted to outlaw the buying of sexual services.

=== French Guiana ===
Although illegal, prostitution in French Guiana is common, especially in the gold mining areas of the interior. Some people are driven into prostitution by poverty. The HIV rate is the highest of any French territory, and sex workers are at risk due to inconsistent condom use.

Women and children from Suriname are victims of sex trafficking in French Guiana.

Although brothels were outlawed in 1946 by Loi Marthe Richard, the French military continued to run "Bordel militaire de campagne". The last one on French territory was at Kourou until it was closed in 1995 following a complaint of unfair competition from a local pimp.

=== Guadeloupe ===
Despite the law, prostitution occurs in Guadeloupe. The old town centre of Pointe-à-Pitre is taken over by prostitutes from the Dominican Republic plying their trade after dark, and abandoned houses are turned into makeshift brothels. The Grand-Baie area in the Pointe-à-Pitre suburb of Le Gosier is also known for prostitution, as is Saint-François, where many prostitutes work.

Dominican prostitutes also work from bars in Le Gosier. In May 2017 a Dominican prostitution ring was dismantled, and 16 people arrested. The 3 ringleaders, 2 men and a woman, were indicted for pimping, procuring and assisting with illegal residence. The ring smuggled in dozens of Dominican women to work at several locations.

Le Centre Associatif de Santé et d’Accompagnement sur les risques sexuels (CASA) (eng:The Associative Center for Health and Support on Sexual Risks), who provide support and information to sex workers, especially in the area of sexual health, have called for the decriminalisation of sex work and the opening of brothels.

Prostitutes are known locally as "pangnols".

=== Martinique ===
The first laws on prostitution in Martinique were passed in the 1850s. They were designed to keep prostitutes away from public areas but poorly enforced. In the 1930s, after the emergence of tourism and the start of WW2, a new set of laws were enabled. The new laws targeted prostitution in the bars and restaurants of Fort-de-France, which the colonial authorities believed were a major factor of STIs. As a result, all waitresses and hostesses had to have a valid "certificat de non contagiosité", whether they were prostitutes or not. The aim of the authorities was to move all prostitution into brothels. The women were reluctant to work in the brothels, so prostitution remained in the bars and restaurants.

When the "law Marthe Richard" came into force in 1947, banning brothels, the authorities aim of restricting prostitution to brothels was unachievable.

HIV is a problem on the island, In 1988 it was reported that 50% of sex workers were infected.

In modern-day Martinique, street prostitution is common in the Terres-Sainville district of Fort-de-France. Most of the prostitutes are migrants from the Dominican Republic, Venezuela, Haiti, Colombia, Brazil and St. Kitts and Nevis, who have come to Martinique seeking a better life.

=== Mayotte ===
Prostitution in Mayotte occurs on the ring road and in the villages of Mtsapere and Kaweni in the commune of Mamoudzou. Many of the prostitutes are illegal immigrants from Madagascar and Comoros, who are transported to the islands at night in kwassa-kwassa boats. An area in Passamainty, also part of the Mamoudzou commune, used for drugs and prostitution, was destroyed by locals in July 2016.

Child prostitution is a problem on the island. Some girls, aged from 11 to 15 years old, turn to prostitution through poverty of their families. Before being destroyed by locals, there was an area in Passamainty where underage girls engaged in prostitution to pay for drugs. There is also organised child prostitution of girls trafficked from Madagascar.

=== Réunion ===
Following the French law prohibiting "passive soliciting" in 2003, street prostitution in Réunion was greatly reduced. Many prostitutes now use classified advertisements in newspapers such as "Clicanoo" (Journal de l'île de La Réunion) and the internet. Some students at the University of La Réunion use prostitution to fund their way through university.

Street prostitution still occurs in Saint-Denis (the capital city) and in Saint-Pierre, especially along the waterfronts. Many of the prostitutes are of foreign origin, mostly from Madagascar (85%) and Mauritius. Often they come to the island on a 15-day tourist visa. There is evidence of organised prostitution rings bringing women from Madagascar and Mauritius.

Since 2015, "Familial Planning 974" have been offering outreach services to prostitutes on the island. Services include advice and information, STI screening, distribution of condoms and gels and self-defence classes.

== Overseas collectivities ==
Overseas collectivities are part of France, but they have their own regional assemblies and legislature.

=== French Polynesia ===
Prostitution in French Polynesia is legal, while brothels are not. In French Polynesia's capital, Papeete, it was estimated that there were about 100 prostitutes working the streets in 2012. Of these 30% were female, 20% male and 50% transsexual (known as "raerae").

When Captain Samuel Wallis discovered Tahiti in 1767, he traded with the islanders for fresh provisions. The Polynesians had no source of iron, and the women sold sex for nails. Wallis had to ban shore leave for the crew for fear of the ship collapsing as so many nails had been removed from the structure. When Captain Cook arrived in 1769, the price had risen from one nail to three nails. By the time of Cook's 3rd visit in 1774, the currency had changed from nails to European clothes and red parrot feathers (considered sacred).

=== Saint Barthélemy ===
Although a small island (population 9,279 in 2013), there is evidence of some prostitution.

=== Saint Martin ===
The growth of tourism starting in the 1970s caused an increase in prostitution in Saint Martin. Although outlawed in 1946 by the "Loi de Marthe Richard", brothels were tolerated until the introduction of the new Penal code in 1991. One hotel, now closed, was reserved for French civil servants and reputedly offered the guests European prostitutes.

Over the years women from different countries have migrated to the country and worked as prostitutes. In the 1960s it was women from Haiti, Dominican women followed in the 1970s. In the early 1990s, Latin American women from Costa Rica, Venezuela, Colombia and Brazil came to the island. Later in that decade Asian, Jamaican and Guyanese prostitutes arrived. Currently most prostitutes are from Haiti, Dominican Republic, Trinidad and Jamaica.

Despite laws prohibiting soliciting, street prostitution still exists, especially in the Quartier-d'Orleans.

=== Saint Pierre and Miquelon ===
This group of small islands off the coast of Canada is the only remaining French territory in the former New France. Siegfried Borelli and Willy Starck found no evidence of prostitution on the islands.

=== Wallis and Futuna ===
Uvea (Wallis Island), became a place where whalers would stop to take on fresh provisions in the 19th century. The women of the island engaged in prostitution with the sailors. In 1870, Amelia Tokagahahau Aliki Queen of Uvea, approved a new legal code written by French missionary Pierre Bataillon. The code included fines for prostitution. The islands of Uvea, Futuna and Sigave became a French protectorate in 1889 and French law came into force.

Whilst the three kings of the islands, assisted by a prime minister and a ‘chefferie’, have limited powers to legislate on local matters, the laws of France are applicable in the country. These include the laws on prostitution, e.g. prohibition of purchasing sex, solicitation, pimping and brothels.

== Overseas territory ==
There is one Overseas territory.

=== French Southern and Antarctic Lands ===
The French Southern and Antarctic Lands consist of small islands off the coast of Madagascar, small isolated islands in the south Indian Ocean and France's claim in Antarctica. The islands are uninhabited, or sparsely inhabited (total population 150 in summer, 300 in winter), so there is no known prostitution.

== Special status ==
=== New Caledonia ===
Following the 1998 Nouméa Accord, the islands of New Caledonia are moving from an overseas collectivity to a self-governing nation. On 12 December 2016, the government added the French Law of June 2016 that criminalised the purchasers of sex to its Penal Code. Related activities such as brothel-keeping and proxenetism have been illegal since 1946.

In May 1940, the French Army brought a large house in the capital Nouméa. They leased it to a Mme Benitier to set up a brothel. This was recognised as a "maison de tolérance" and known as The Pink House. The house became popular with American troops during their build up in the country in 1942/3. American military police and medics were on duty at the house to keep order and prevent the spread of STIs.

=== Clipperton Island ===
Clipperton Island, off the coast of Mexico, is uninhabited so no prostitution occurs.

== See also ==
- Prostitution in France
