= Human trafficking in Chile =

Chile ratified the 2000 UN TIP Protocol in November 2004.

Chilean law does specifically prohibit trafficking in persons, and there were isolated reports that persons were trafficked to, from, and within the country for the purposes of sexual exploitation and involuntary domestic servitude. The law criminalizes promoting the entry into or exit from the country of persons for the purpose of facilitating prostitution, with penalties of up to three years in prison and a fine of $827. Sanctions are increased in a number of circumstances, including cases in which the victim is a minor, violence or intimidation is used, deception or abuse of authority is involved, the victim is related or under the tutelage of the perpetrator, or advantage is taken of a victim's circumstances or handicap. The law criminalizes the prostitution of children and corruption of minors, and the age of consent for sexual relations is 14. The law criminalizes obtaining sexual services from a minor in exchange for money or other considerations.

The U.S. State Department's Office to Monitor and Combat Trafficking in Persons placed the country in "Tier 1" in 2017 and in 2023.

In 2023, the Organised Crime Index gave the country a score of 6 out of 10 for human trafficking, noting that numbers of victims had increased, while numbers of prosecutions had gone down.

== Prosecution and Prevention ==
Most trafficking victims were minors trafficked internally for sexual exploitation. Within the country, victims reportedly were trafficked from rural areas to urban areas such as Santiago, Iquique, and Valparaiso. Law enforcement authorities stated that small numbers of victims were trafficked to the neighboring countries of Argentina, Peru, and Bolivia, as well as to the United States, Europe, and Asia. Victims were reportedly coming to the country in 2011-2017 from Dominican Republic, Peru, Argentinian, Ecuador, Venezuela, Korea, Russia, South Africa, India, Indonesia, China, Paraguay, Colombia, and Bolivia, although it was difficult to distinguish trafficking victims from economic migrants.

Anecdotal reports suggested that young women were the primary targets for trafficking to other countries. Traffickers reportedly used newspaper advertisements for models and product promoters to lure girls, ages 11 to 17, into prostitution. Law enforcement agencies indicated that traffickers looking for children also targeted economically disadvantaged families, convincing the parents that they were giving the child the opportunity for a better life.

An antitrafficking coordinator in the Interior Ministry worked with the Public Ministry to gather information on new cases investigated and prosecuted. From May 1995 through March, 83 new cases were opened, with 5 pending active investigations and 1 prosecutions initiated by the year's end. Most trafficking-related cases dealt with commercial sexual exploitation of minors. The Public Ministry investigated 11 cases of cross-border trafficking in persons from January to November, compared with seven cases in all of 1995. Additionally, the PICH sex crimes and cybercrime units worked with the Ministries of Justice and Interior to address trafficking. The government cooperated with Interpol on law enforcement activities.

The Ministry of Labor performed regular worksite inspections, responded to specific complaints, and maintained offices in each region and throughout the Santiago Metropolitan Region to identify potentially abusive situations and inform workers of their legal rights. The Public Ministry trained hundreds of law enforcement agents to recognize and investigate potential trafficking and trained prosecutors to prosecute cases more effectively. SERNAM raised trafficking awareness and provided information on victim's rights and the prosecution of traffickers to 100 officials and 160 civic activists in the border cities of Iquique and Arica.

The government made substantial efforts to assist trafficking victims during the year. Child victims trafficked into sexual exploitation received counseling, psychological and health care, and educational courses in NGO-operated centers for abused and exploited children. The government gave two million dollars to 16 NGOs that implement victim-assistance programs in 12 different districts. Police officials who identified child trafficking victims referred them to family courts for placement in protective custody with foster families, relatives, or shelters and put victims in contact with NGOs.

SENAME worked with 75 local offices, with international organizations, including the International Organization for Migration, and with NGOs to ensure that minors involved in possible trafficking situations were not returned to abusive or high-risk situations. The government also worked with Bolivian and Argentine authorities to coordinate the safe repatriation of foreign victims. Trafficking victims may remain in the country during legal proceedings against their traffickers. Victims may also bring legal action against traffickers and seek restitution. The government had no residence visa program for foreign trafficking victims; however, at least one victim was granted temporary residence to avoid returning her to potential re-victimization in her home country.

In 2008, the Chilean government set up the national multi-party task force "Intersectorial Committee against Trafficking in Person" for the first time. However, it was not until 2013-2014 that a first national action plan was drafted, which strategically pursued awareness-raising and training, as well as detection, prosecution and victim assistance in international cooperation.

According to the Chilean Human Trafficking Investigation Unit (Brigada Investigadora de Trata de Personas Metropolitana - Bitrap), 47 new cases of human trafficking were identified in 2018. Compared to the previous year, there were only nine cases in 2017.

In 2019, the government concluded various cooperation agreements to ensure the elimination of child labor and developed a plan until 2022 to combat human trafficking and include social programs to fight child labor. In the same year, a law was passed to protect children and young people from being re-traumatized in criminal testimonies against human trafficking.
