= Human trafficking in Nicaragua =

Nicaragua ratified the 2000 UN TIP Protocol in October 2004.

In 2010 Nicaragua was a transit country for migrants from Africa and East Asia en route to the United States; some may have fallen victim to human trafficking.

In 2010, the Government of Nicaragua did not fully comply with the minimum standards for the elimination of trafficking; however, it made significant efforts to do so. In 2009 the government convicted two trafficking offenders and sentenced them to 12 years’ imprisonment. Despite such efforts, the government showed little overall evidence of progress in combating human trafficking, particularly in terms of providing adequate assistance and protection to victims, confronting trafficking-related complicity by government officials, and increasing public awareness about human trafficking; therefore, Nicaragua remained on the U.S. State Department's Office to Monitor and Combat Trafficking in Persons Tier 2 Watch List for the second consecutive year.

In 2013, Nicaragua was principally a source and transit country for women and children subjected to trafficking in persons, specifically forced prostitution and forced labor. Nicaraguan women and children were trafficked for commercial sexual exploitation within the country as well as in neighboring countries, most often to El Salvador, Costa Rica, Guatemala, Honduras, Mexico, and the United States. Trafficking victims were recruited in rural areas for work in urban centers, particularly Managua, and subsequently coerced into prostitution. Adults and children were subjected to conditions of forced labor in agriculture (especially in the production of coffee and bananas), the fishing industry (collecting shellfish), and for involuntary domestic servitude within the country and in Costa Rica. There were reports of some Nicaraguans forced to engage in drug trafficking. To a lesser extent, Nicaragua was a destination country for women and children recruited from neighboring countries for forced prostitution. Managua, Granada, Estelí, and San Juan del Sur were destinations for foreign child sex tourists from the United States, Canada, and Western Europe, and some travel agencies were reportedly complicit in promoting child sex tourism.

The U.S. placed the country at the "Tier 2 Watchlist" in 2017. In 2020, Nicaragua was blacklisted by the United States in its annual report. This was justified on the grounds that the COVID-19 pandemic would lead to an increase in trafficking. The country was placed at Tier 3 in 2023.

The Bureau of International Labor Affairs reported in its 2019 report that Nicaragua is making minimal progress against the forms of child labor that are also affected by sexual exploitation and human trafficking. For example, there is no specific school age in Nicaragua and the policy to abolish and protect child labor has not yet been fully implemented.

In 2023, the Organised Crime Index noted that the country had not formally identified any victims in the past five years.

== Prosecution (2010) ==
The Government of Nicaragua sustained modest efforts to combat human trafficking through law enforcement activities during the reporting period. Nicaragua criminalizes all forms of human trafficking. Article 182 of the Penal Code prohibits trafficking in persons for the purposes of slavery, sexual exploitation, and adoption, prescribing penalties of 7 to 10 years’ imprisonment. A separate statute, Article 315, prohibits the submission, maintenance, or forced recruitment of another person into slavery, forced labor, servitude, or participation in an armed conflict; this offense carries penalties of five to eight years imprisonment. These prescribed punishments are sufficiently stringent and commensurate with penalties prescribed for other serious crimes, such as rape.

During the reporting period, the government investigated nine trafficking cases and initiated three prosecutions, compared with 13 investigations and 10 prosecutions initiated in 2008. The government convicted two trafficking offenders, each of whom received a sentence of 12 years’ imprisonment, which represents an increase in convictions from the previous year when no trafficking offenders were convicted. Nicaraguan authorities collaborated with the governments of neighboring countries to jointly investigate two trafficking cases over last year. Despite credible reports from non-governmental organizations (NGOs) and the local media regarding local officials’ complicity in or tolerance of human trafficking, particularly in border regions, the government did not investigate or prosecute any officials for suspected involvement in trafficking offenses. During the year, international organizations and NGOs reported a decrease in law enforcement efforts to combat trafficking, and authorities often did not take action or investigate cases, even when given specific details regarding the whereabouts of suspected traffickers.

== Protection (2010) ==
The Nicaraguan government made inadequate efforts to protect trafficking victims during the last year, and NGOs and international organizations continued to be the principal providers of services to victims. The government provided basic shelter and services to some child trafficking victims, but such assistance was not readily accessible in all parts of the country, and the government reportedly decreased its already limited assistance to these shelters over the past year. There were no government-operated shelters for trafficking victims, though NGOs operated shelters for sex trafficking victims. Adult trafficking victims were largely unable to access any government-sponsored victim services, although the government provided limited legal, medical and psychological services to some victims.

During the reporting period, eight Nicaraguan trafficking victims were repatriated from El Salvador and Guatemala; most victims receiving services were reported to be Nicaraguans who had been trafficked abroad. The government encouraged victims to participate in trafficking investigations and prosecutions, though most were reluctant to do so due to social stigma and fear of retribution from traffickers, as the government offers no witness protection for victims who serve as prosecution witnesses. While the rights of trafficking victims are generally upheld, some victims may not have been identified as victims of human trafficking by authorities. The government provided a temporary legal alternative to the removal of foreign victims to countries where they may face hardship or retribution. NGOs provided limited training on human trafficking to some law enforcement and immigration officials.

== Prevention (2010) ==
The Nicaraguan government's efforts to prevent trafficking remained inadequate. The government conducted no anti-trafficking outreach or education campaigns in 2009, although NGOs and international organizations conducted public awareness campaigns with limited government collaboration. The government converted a hotline formerly dedicated to human trafficking into a hotline for reporting on the general welfare of children. The government's interagency anti-trafficking committee was responsible for coordinating anti-trafficking efforts, but conducted few activities, and NGOs questioned the committee's capability and commitment to combat trafficking.

Government partnership with NGOs on anti-trafficking activities is reported to be better at the local level. Authorities partnered with an NGO in northern Nicaraguan to raise awareness about the commercial sexual exploitation of children; however, the government made limited efforts to combat child sex tourism. The government undertook no other initiatives to reduce demand for commercial sexual acts, such as conducting national awareness raising campaigns on child prostitution, and it did not report any efforts to reduce demand for forced labor.

== New legislation ==
In 2015, the Nicaraguan government drafted the first law criminalizing human trafficking. After the socio-political crisis of 2019, National Coalition against Migrant Smuggling and Trafficking in Persons (CONATT) recorded a doubling of victims compared to 2018.
