= Human trafficking in the Maldives =

== Background (2010) ==
In 2010, the Maldives was primarily a destination country for migrant workers from Bangladesh, and, to a lesser extent, India, some of whom were subjected to trafficking in persons, specifically forced labor. Some women were also subjected to forced prostitution. An unknown number of the 110,000 foreign workers working in the Maldives - primarily in the construction and service sectors - faced fraudulent recruitment practices, confiscation of identity and travel documents, withholding or non-payment of wages, or debt bondage. Thirty thousand of these workers did not have legal status in the country, though both legal and illegal workers were vulnerable to conditions of forced labor. Diplomatic sources estimated that half of the 35,000 Bangladeshis in the Maldives went there illegally and that most of these workers were probably victims of trafficking. Migrant workers pay $1,000 to $4,000 in recruitment fees in order to migrate to the Maldives; such high recruitment costs increase workers’ vulnerability to forced labor, as concluded in a recent ILO report.

A small number of women from Sri Lanka, Thailand, India, China, the Philippines, Eastern Europe, and former Soviet Union countries were recruited for forced prostitution in Malé, the capital. A small number of underage Maldivian girls reportedly were trafficked to Male from other islands for involuntary domestic servitude; this is a corruption of the widely acknowledged practice where families sent Maldivian girls to live with a host family in Male for educational purposes.

Trafficking offenders usually fell into three groups: families that subjected domestic servants to forced labor; employment agents who brought low-skilled migrant workers to the Maldives under false terms of employment and upon payment of high fees; and employers who subjected the migrants to conditions of forced labor upon arrival.

The Government of the Maldives did not comply with the minimum standards for the elimination of trafficking in persons; however, it made significant efforts to do so. Despite these efforts, the government lacks systematic procedures for identifying victims of trafficking among vulnerable populations, and during the reporting period it did not investigate or prosecute trafficking-related offenses or take concrete actions to protect trafficking victims and prevent trafficking in the Maldives. Therefore, the Maldives is placed on Tier 2 Watch List. After 30 years of one-party rule, the new government - formed in 2009 - continued to build the institutions of democratic governance.

== International response ==
The country ratified the 2000 UN TIP Protocol in September 2016.

In 2021, the Organised Crime Index noted that the government had brought in new laws on the crime; however, the country still had a large problem in this area.

The U.S. State Department's Office to Monitor and Combat Trafficking in Persons report placed the country in "Tier 2" in 2023.

== Prosecution (2010) ==
The Government of the Maldives undertook limited anti-human trafficking law enforcement efforts during the last year. Although the Maldives does not have laws prohibiting human trafficking offenses, its constitution prohibits forced labor and slavery. The only prescribed penalty for labor trafficking offenses is a fine. The government did not investigate or prosecute any trafficking cases. The Labor Tribunal, created as part of the 2008 Employment Act, heard eight cases involving foreign workers whose wages had not been paid - a possible indicator of forced labor - but the tribunal lacked legal authority to enforce its decision. In addition, employment tribunal members and employees expressed concerns about their ability to resolve cases involving foreign workers because all their proceedings were conducted in the local language.

== Protection (2010) ==
The Maldivian government made limited efforts to ensure that victims of trafficking received access to necessary assistance during the reporting period. The government did not develop or implement formal procedures for proactively identifying victims, and the government did not identify any specific cases of trafficking or provide an estimate of the number of victims. Officers with the Maldivian Police and the Department of Immigration and Emigration have received training in the recognition of trafficking victims. The Maldives did not provide services such as shelter, counseling, medical care, or legal aid to foreign or Maldivian victims of trafficking. On an ad hoc basis, it provided extremely short-term housing for migrants immediately before deportation. The government's general policy for dealing with trafficking victims was deportation, and it did not provide foreign victims with legal alternatives to their removal to countries where they might face hardship or retribution. Authorities did not encourage victims to participate in the investigation or prosecution of trafficking offenders, since no investigations or prosecutions took place. Due to a lack of comprehensive victim identification procedures, the Maldives may not have ensured that expatriates subjected to forced labor and prostitution were not inappropriately incarcerated, fined, or otherwise penalized for unlawful acts committed as a direct result of being trafficking. =

== Prevention (2010) ==
The Maldives made limited progress to prevent human trafficking over the last year. The government did not conduct any anti-trafficking or educational campaigns and it did not take steps to create an inter-agency structure - such as a committee or plan of action - for coordination on anti-trafficking matters. The government did not take any measures to reduce demand for forced labor on the islands. In 2010, the Maldives enacted a provision in the 2008 Employment Act requiring all employers to use employment agents. The Human Rights Commission of the Maldives, a constitutionally-established independent body, published a report in August 2009 that contained strong trafficking-related recommendations including prosecutions for forced labor offenders and regulations of recruitment agencies. In February 2010, the Ministry of Home Affairs’ Department of Immigration and Emigration prominently posted on its website a readout of bilateral discussions on trafficking. Senior government officials recently attended the South Asian Association for Regional Cooperation’s convention on trafficking, which focused on sex trafficking.

== Post 2010 ==
=== 2013 Anti Human Trafficking law ===
On 03 December 2013, the parliament passed a bill against human trafficking, making it and related acts, criminal offenses. Violators under this law receive 10-15 years of imprisonment.

=== 2020-2022 National Anti-Human Trafficking Action Plan ===
A cabinet initiative which aimed to stop human trafficking. It involved several studies, establishment of a hotline for human trafficking reporting, legal, and educational initiatives.

=== Ongoing efforts 2023-2026 ===
Since 2022, multiple efforts and new action plans have resulted in some change. In 2024 a trafficking network was taken down and in 2025 a new action plan was implemented.
