= Human trafficking in Tajikistan =

Tajikistan ratified the 2000 UN TIP Protocol in July 2002.

== Background in 2008 ==
In 2010 Tajikistan was a source country for women trafficked through Kyrgyzstan and Russia to the United Arab Emirates (U.A.E.), Turkey, and Russia for the purpose of commercial sexual exploitation. Women were also reportedly trafficked to Pakistan for the purposes of sexual exploitation and forced labor. Men were trafficked to Russia and Kazakhstan for the purpose of forced labor, primarily in the construction and agricultural industries. Boys and girls were trafficked internally for various purposes, including forced labor and forced begging. The Government of Tajikistan did not fully comply with the minimum standards for the elimination of trafficking; however, it made significant efforts to do so. Tajikistan is placed on Tier 2 Watch List for its failure to provide evidence over the previous year of increasing efforts to combat human trafficking, especially efforts to investigate, prosecute, convict, and sentence traffickers. Despite endemic government corruption and evidence of individual low- and mid-level officials’ complicity in trafficking, the government did not punish any public officials for trafficking complicity during the reporting period. Lack of capacity and poor coordination between government institutions remained key obstacles to effective anti-trafficking efforts; corruption remained a contributing factor. Tajikistan made only some efforts to raise awareness about the dangers of trafficking among its estimated one million citizens who find permanent or seasonal work abroad, primarily in Russia and Kazakhstan. The government approved changes to its law defining trafficking. The government continued to improve cooperation with International Organization for Migration (IOM) and NGOs.

== International response ==
The U.S. State Department's Office to Monitor and Combat Trafficking in Persons placed the country in "Tier 2" in 2017 and 2023.

In 2023, the Organised Crime Index noted that while the country had co-founded the Vulnerable Communities Project, the government focused on prosecuting traffickers rather than prevention of the crime.

== Prosecution (2008) ==
Tajikistan demonstrated decreased anti-trafficking law enforcement efforts during the reporting period. Article 130.1 of the criminal code prohibits both sexual exploitation and forced labor, and prescribes penalties of five to 15 years’ imprisonment, which are sufficiently stringent, but not commensurate with penalties prescribed for other grave crimes, such as rape. To date, the government has not successfully prosecuted a single trafficking case using Article 130.1, and authorities report that they generally do not prosecute labor trafficking cases. In 2007, authorities reported 12 trafficking investigations, compared to 34 in 2006. The government reported 19 prosecutions, compared to 34 reported in 2006. Courts reported 11 convictions for 2007, compared to 52 convictions reported in 2006. The government did not provide specific information on convicted traffickers serving time in prison. Despite reports of some government officials assisting traffickers by providing false passports, birth certificates, and marriage certificates, the government provided little information on efforts to investigate or punish corrupt officials. The government worked with some foreign governments on trafficking investigations; however, Tajik officials did not use such cooperation to gather evidence for prosecutions in Tajikistan. Justice officials developed legal commentaries on trafficking statutes for use in the criminal justice system, and modules on trafficking statutes have been integrated into the judicial training curriculum.

== Protection (2008) ==
The government sustained modest efforts to assist trafficking victims during the reporting period. The Ministry of Health continued to provide some health and social services to victims, including those assisted in two foreign-funded shelters. The Ministry of Interior also continued to provide security and protection for these shelters. Forty-six victims were provided with shelter and assistance during the year. The government made no efforts to develop and implement systematic victim identification procedures or a domestic mechanism to refer victims to care providers. Although the government provided no special training for diplomatic staff in Tajikistan’s embassies and consulates abroad, Tajik embassy officials in the U.A.E. assisted in the repatriation of 35 victims in 2007. Border guards also assisted repatriated victims by expediting them through immigration and customs. Victims were encouraged to participate in trafficking investigations and prosecutions; however, social stigma and the lack of a witness protection program significantly hindered such participation.

== Prevention (2008) ==
Tajikistan demonstrated very limited prevention efforts during the reporting period. Some local government officials participated in trafficking prevention and awareness campaigns in cooperation with NGOs and international organizations. The government made some structural reforms to improve its ability to monitor emigration patterns for evidence of trafficking. The government continued to station border guards at Dushanbe’s airports and along border checkpoints, and trained them to identify potential traffickers and victims.
