= Human trafficking in Kyrgyzstan =

The Kyrgyz Republic ratified the 2000 UN TIP Protocol in October 2003.

In 2008 Kyrgyzstan was a source, transit, and to a lesser extent a destination country for men and women trafficked from Uzbekistan, Tajikistan, and Turkmenistan for purposes of forced labor and commercial sexual exploitation. Men and women were trafficked to Kazakhstan for forced agricultural labor - mainly in tobacco fields - to Russia for forced construction work, and to China for bonded labor. Kyrgyz and foreign women were trafficked to the U.A.E., China, Kazakhstan, South Korea, Italy, Turkey, Greece, Cyprus, Thailand, Germany, and Syria for sexual exploitation.

The Government of the Kyrgyz Republic did not fully comply with the minimum standards for the elimination of trafficking in 2008; however, it made significant efforts to do so. Although the government demonstrated some limited progress in collecting law enforcement data, complicity in trafficking of low-level government officials remained a concern. NGOs reported improved efforts by law enforcement personnel in referring victims for assistance.

The U.S. State Department's Office to Monitor and Combat Trafficking in Persons placed the country in "Tier 2" in 2017 and 2023.

In 2023, the Organised Crime Index noted human trafficking was one of the country's most significant crimes, and that it was mainly carried out by international gangs working with local low-level officials.

== Sex trafficking ==
Citizen and foreign women and girls are victims of sex trafficking in Kyrgyzstan. They are raped and physically and physiologically harmed in brothels, hotels, homes, and other locations throughout the country.

== Prosecution (2008) ==
The Kyrgyz government demonstrated limited law enforcement efforts during the reporting period. A 2005 law on Prevention and Combating Trafficking in Persons criminalizes trafficking for both sexual exploitation and forced labor; prescribed sentences range from three to 20 years’ imprisonment, which are sufficiently stringent and commensurate with penalties prescribed for other grave crimes, such as rape. In 2007, the government conducted 33 investigations - 19 of them pertaining to alleged labor trafficking crimes - compared to 39 investigations in total in 2006. The government did not provide complete data on trafficking prosecutions, though authorities report the conviction of 23 trafficking offenders in 2007. Although the government was unable to provide complete sentencing data, some convicted traffickers served sentences ranging from five to eight years’ imprisonment. NGOs contended that low-level law enforcement officials were complicit and accepted bribes from traffickers; other low-level police reportedly tolerated trafficking due to a lack of awareness. The government provided law enforcement personnel with trafficking- awareness training.

== Protection (2008) ==
The government sustained modest efforts to assist victims during the reporting period. Although the government provided no direct funding for victim services or medical assistance, it continued to provide space for three shelters run by anti-trafficking NGOs. Law enforcement referred four victims to IOM and NGOs for assistance in 2007. In 2007, Kyrgyz citizens identified abroad and repatriated to Kyrgyzstan accounted for 134 of the total of 331 victims identified. Victims are encouraged to participate in trafficking investigations and prosecutions; victims who do not cooperate with law enforcement are potentially subject to being penalized for immigration violations and related offenses, although there were no reports of victims being penalized during the reporting period. The witness protection law, passed in 2006, continued to lack implementation procedures; as a result, no victims of crime - including trafficking victims - were protected by police in 2007.

== Prevention (2008) ==
Kyrgyzstan demonstrated limited trafficking prevention efforts over the last year. The government continued to focus significant attention on migration issues and worked to improve protection for all Kyrgyz migrant workers abroad in Russia and other destination countries. The government continued to publish brochures and leaflets in Kyrgyz and Russian for those seeking work abroad warning of the dangers of trafficking and providing the number for IOM-operated trafficking assistance hot-lines in several countries. The government does not actively monitor immigration and emigration patterns for evidence of trafficking.
