= Human trafficking in Antigua and Barbuda =

Antigua and Barbuda ratified the 2000 UN TIP Protocol in February 2010.

== Background in 2010 ==
Antigua and Barbuda was a destination country for a small number of women from Guyana, Haiti, Jamaica, and the Dominican Republic subjected to trafficking in persons, specifically forced prostitution. To a lesser extent, it was reportedly also a destination country for women subjected to involuntary domestic servitude in private homes. Business people from the Dominican Republic and Antiguan citizens acting as pimps and brothel owners subjected foreign women to forced prostitution primarily in four illegal brothels that operated in Antigua as well as in private residences that operate as brothels. Some of these foreign women voluntarily migrated to Antigua to engage in prostitution but were subsequently subjected to force or coercion and become victims of sex trafficking. After their arrival, brothel managers confiscated their passports and threaten the victims with deportation until they repaid the brothel owner for travel and other expenses they were not aware they had incurred. Some other foreign victims of sex trafficking entered the country legally with work permits as “entertainers” then were subsequently forced to engage in prostitution.

Despite limited resources and a relatively small number of victims, the government identified possible cases of human trafficking, provided training to law enforcement officials, provided victims with shelter and services, and continued to run public awareness and education programs. No trafficking offenders have been arrested or prosecuted, however, and law enforcement officers continue to treat some probable victims as criminals.

== International response ==
The U.S. State Department's Office to Monitor and Combat Trafficking in Persons placed the country in "Tier 2 Watchlist" in 2017. The country was moved to Tier 2 by 2023.

In 2023, the Organised Crime Index gave the country a score of 8 out of 10 for human trafficking, noting that state officials had a substantial involvement in carrying out this crime.

== Prosecution ==
The Government of Antigua and Barbuda made minimal progress in its anti-human trafficking law enforcement efforts over the last year. Authorities assisted probable victims of trafficking, but no trafficking offenders were arrested or prosecuted during the year. Antiguan law does not specifically prohibit trafficking in persons, although forced and compulsory labor are prohibited in the Constitution.

Existing statutes such as Section 18 of the Sexual Offenses Act of 1995 prohibit some sex trafficking offenses and related offenses, though these were not used to prosecute sex trafficking offenders during the year. Prescribed penalties of up to 10 years’ imprisonment for forced prostitution are sufficiently stringent and commensurate with penalties prescribed for other serious crimes. There were no reported efforts to prosecute trafficking offenders under existing laws covering forced adult or child labor. Labor officials reportedly inspected workplaces periodically, and reported no instances of the forced labor of children or adults. Law enforcement and immigration agencies did not yet have sufficient training, funding, and equipment to effectively follow up on requests from the anti-trafficking coalition to investigate suspected cases of sexual and domestic servitude. Immigration officers continued to summarily deport foreign women found engaging in illegal prostitution without first determining whether the women were possible victims of sex trafficking.

Under Antiguan law, it is a crime for employers to confiscate their employees’ passports or other identity and travel documents. Police helped probable trafficking victims to recover their passports and other personal documents that had been confiscated by their employers. No employers, however, were arrested or prosecuted for illegally depriving their employees of their passports or travel documents. Individual immigration officials were reportedly complicit in the sex trafficking of two women during the year. The Gender Affairs Directorate did not yet receive a satisfactory response to its 2008 request that the immigration department conduct a review of why immigration officials had issued work permits to foreign women who were almost certain to engage in an illegal activity such as prostitution, and who had indeed been subjected to debt bondage and commercial sexual exploitation after they entered the country.

== Protection ==
In 2010 the Government of Antigua and Barbuda continued solid efforts to offer victims medical, psychological, legal, and social services. As the government lacked sufficient resources to build a permanent, secure shelter for trafficking victims, the Gender Affairs Directorate established a series of emergency safe havens. This network consisted of several locations provided by businesses, churches, clinics, and private individuals where trafficking victims can be securely sheltered out of reach of their victimizers. The Gender Affairs Directorate received funds to coordinate the work of the National Coalition Against Trafficking in Persons and to provide legal, health, advocacy, and crisis services accessible to all victims of trafficking, regardless of nationality. The Gender Affairs Directorate continued to recruit Spanish-speaking volunteers to assist with suspected cases of trafficking involving foreign nationals. Other non-governmental organizations (NGOs) provided services such as health screening and assistance in repatriation.

In 2010, unlike most other government officials, police and immigration officers made no effort to identify victims among vulnerable populations, such as foreign women in prostitution, and they continued to treat potential trafficking victims as criminals. As that time, Antiguan law did not allow time for immigration officials to investigate whether an illegal migrant is or may be a trafficking victim before he or she must be deported; some foreigners detained for immigration violations likely were trafficking victims. In most cases involving possible trafficking victims, foreign women without proper documentation were deported for immigration violations before officials attempted to identify whether any were trafficking victims and what kind of protection or care any potential victims may have needed. The government offered no legal alternatives to the removal of foreign victims to countries where they would face hardship or retribution. The government did not encourage victims to assist in the investigation and prosecution of trafficking crimes.

== Prevention ==
In 2010 the Government of Antigua and Barbuda sustained modest efforts to prevent human trafficking and increase public awareness of this crime. The government continued to run awareness campaigns, many in English and Spanish, in the form of anti-trafficking brochures and radio spots. Country-wide anti-trafficking activities were coordinated by the National Coalition Against Trafficking in Persons, made up of the Ministries of Social Welfare, Social Transformation, Health, Labor and Gender Affairs, the Immigration department, and the Royal Antigua and Barbuda Police Force as well as partners from various civil society groups, NGOs, and community activists and advocates. The coalition, under the leadership of the Gender Affairs Directorate, met at the end of every month to discuss suspected cases, formulate strategies to address them, and follow up with law enforcement to conduct investigations.

In 2010 the coalition’s national action plan focused on educating immigrants, the general public, and front-line workers on human trafficking; established a spokesperson to represent the coalition; combined trafficking outreach and protection efforts with the Gender Affairs Directorate’s crisis hotline; and reviewed anti-trafficking legislation and statutory instruments. The government also formed individual partnerships with regional and local NGOs, religious representatives and community advocates to better organize their anti-trafficking efforts and outreach. The government did not carry out or sponsor any programs to reduce demand for commercial sex during the reporting period.
