= Human trafficking in Liberia =

Liberia ratified the 2000 UN TIP Protocol in September 2004.

In 2008, Liberia was a source, transit, and destination country for children trafficked for forced labor and sexual exploitation. Most victims were trafficked within Liberia, primarily from rural areas to urban areas for domestic servitude, forced street vending, and sexual exploitation. Children were also trafficked to alluvial diamond mining areas for forced labor. Refugees and internally displaced children in Liberia were subjected to sexual exploitation by some international organization and non-governmental organization (NGO) personnel. A January 2008 United Nations (UN) report indicated that such abuses by UN personnel declined in the previous year.

There have been reports that children were trafficked to Liberia from Sierra Leone, Guinea, and Côte d'Ivoire and from Liberia to Côte d'Ivoire, Guinea, and Nigeria for domestic servitude, street vending, sexual exploitation, and agricultural labor. Struggling to rebuild after 14 years of civil conflict and two years of transitional rule, the capacity of the government elected in 2005 to address trafficking is limited by a crippled judiciary and a lack of resources. Aside from capacity issues, in the wake of its war, Liberia has not been sufficiently aggressive in prosecuting traffickers or providing care to victims.

In 2008, the Government of Liberia did not fully comply with the minimum standards for the elimination of trafficking. However, it made significant efforts to do so despite limited resources. Great improvements were needed in the areas of law enforcement and victim protection. At the same time, the government undertook commendable efforts in the area of prevention.

The U.S. State Department's Office to Monitor and Combat Trafficking in Persons placed the country in, "Tier 2 Watchlist" in 2017. The country was placed at Tier 2 in 2023.

In 2023, the Organised Crime Index noted that the country had reduced its number of investigations and prosecutions.

== Prosecution (2008) ==
The Government of Liberia demonstrated limited law enforcement efforts to combat trafficking in 2008. Liberia's 2005 Act to Ban Trafficking prohibits all forms of trafficking, but no traffickers have been convicted or sentenced under this law. The law prescribes a minimum penalty of one year imprisonment for labor trafficking of adults, six years' imprisonment for sex trafficking of adults, five to 11 years' imprisonment for child labor trafficking, and 11 to 16 years' imprisonment for child sex trafficking. These penalties are sufficiently stringent and commensurate with penalties prescribed for rape.

The government investigated seven trafficking cases in 2008, six of which were cases of trafficking within the country and one of which involved transnational trafficking. Three suspects remain in police custody pending trial, three were released on bail after their charges were reduced, and one suspect was deported. All newly recruited police officers continued to participate in UN-sponsored trainings on trafficking. Due to a shortage of funds, police continue to lack basic investigatory tools, such as vehicles, and rely heavily on UN assistance. The Women and Children Protection Section (WCPS) of the Liberia National Police collaborated with the UN to address sexual exploitation and abuse of minors by expatriate humanitarian workers in Liberia as well as by Liberian nationals.

== Protection (2008) ==
Liberia demonstrated minimal efforts to protect trafficking victims during 2008. Due to lack of resources, the government does not directly provide shelter or other services to victims. The Liberian government refers victims to NGOs with the capacity to provide victim care. The WCPS referred victims to an international NGO and was available to provide security for victims. The government was unable to provide statistics on the number of children assisted.

The government does not encourage victims, all of whom are children, to assist in trafficking investigations or prosecutions. Liberia does not provide legal alternatives to the removal of foreign victims to countries where they face hardship or retribution. Victims are not inappropriately incarcerated, fined or otherwise penalized for unlawful acts committed as a direct result of being trafficked.

== Prevention (2008) ==
The Government of Liberia made significant efforts to educate the public about trafficking. The Ministry of Labor's Commission on Child Labor launched a campaign to alert parents and children about the dangers of child labor on rubber plantations. The National Human Trafficking Task Force aired anti-trafficking radio spots funded by the Liberian government. Since November 2007, the Task Force has also worked closely with a local NGO on anti-trafficking public education programs by providing legal guidance.

In October 2007, the Task Force held a government-funded workshop to sensitize local government officials about trafficking. The Task Force, which is chaired by the Minister of Labor, but which lacks a budget, held a meeting every two months in 2007. The government's Commission on Child Labor, which was reestablished in 2005, continued to meet quarterly during the year. The government has taken steps to reduce demand for commercial sex acts through its awareness campaign against sexual exploitation and abuse.

== See also ==
- Crime in Liberia
