= Human trafficking in Sweden =

The Government of Sweden fully complies with the minimum standards for the elimination of human trafficking. Beginning in July 2007, all foreign victims of trafficking were granted temporary residence permits for a minimum 30-day reflection period to consider whether to cooperate with law enforcement. In December 2007, the government adopted a national action plan on child sexual exploitation, improved awareness on trafficking issues, and increased internal and international cooperation to combat child sex tourism. The government continued to fund both awareness and victim assistance programs in trafficking source countries.

U.S. State Department's Office to Monitor and Combat Trafficking in Persons placed the country in "Tier 1" in 2017.

== Prosecution ==
Over the last year, the Government of Sweden sustained strong law enforcement efforts to fight sex trafficking, but made limited efforts to address labor trafficking. Sweden's 2002 anti-trafficking law prohibits trafficking for both sexual exploitation and forced labor, which prescribes penalties of two to 10 years’ imprisonment, which are commensurate with penalties prescribed for other grave crimes. Prosecutors continued, however, to rely on a prostitution procurement law with weaker penalties to prosecute and convict a number of sex traffickers. In 2007, police conducted 15 trafficking investigations, a decrease from 28 investigations in 2006. Authorities prosecuted and convicted two sex traffickers using the anti-trafficking law and 11 using the procurement statute, down from 21 prosecutions and convictions in 2006. One trafficker was sentenced to up to eight years’ imprisonment, one trafficker was sentenced to 14 months’ imprisonment, and 11 traffickers were sentenced to up to two years’ imprisonment; no trafficking sentences were suspended. Authorities reported 34 cases of labor trafficking in 2007, though the government failed to prosecute or convict any labor traffickers. Authorities did work with British and Irish counterparts, however, on several labor trafficking investigations over the reporting period.

== Protection ==
Sweden continued to provide adequate victim assistance both domestically and in source countries during the reporting period. The government continued to fund NGOs in Sweden and abroad to provide victim rehabilitation, health care, vocational training, and legal assistance. Swedish authorities encourage victims to participate in trafficking investigations and prosecutions; identified foreign victims are granted a minimum 30-day temporary residency permit that provides victims with access to health care and social services.

Over the reporting period, 11 female victims stayed in state-funded shelters and 10 received temporary residency permits. Victims who decline to participate in investigations are subject to deportation. The Swedish government does not offer legal alternatives to the removal of foreign victims to countries where they face hardship or retribution. In 2007, authorities deported one victim to Nigeria. There are no government programs for assistance to repatriated victims; however, some state-funded NGOs have programs to ensure victims from specific source countries are provided with safe repatriation. The government ensures that victims are not penalized for unlawful acts committed as a result of their being trafficked.

== Prevention ==
The Government of Sweden continued its trafficking prevention efforts. In 2007, the Swedish International Development Agency (SIDA) continued funding awareness-building projects in the former Yugoslavia, Romania, Albania, and Bulgaria. SIDA also contributed $42,000 to a United Nations Office on Drugs and Crime (UNODC) project based in Brazil to counter trafficking and migrant smuggling. The Ministry of Foreign Affairs eliminated the position of Swedish Ambassador for International Cooperation against Trafficking in Human Beings. Sweden adequately monitored immigration patterns for evidence of trafficking and continued its annual report, assessing trafficking trends and government efforts. In March 2007, the Swedish National Defense Ministry adopted new regulations, organized an education campaign, and distributed anti-trafficking awareness material to Swedish troops being deployed as international peacekeepers.

== See also ==
- Human rights in Sweden
- Prostitution in Sweden
