= Human trafficking in Sierra Leone =

In 2008, Sierra Leone was a source, transit, and destination country for children and women trafficked for the purposes of forced labor and commercial sexual exploitation. Trafficking within the country is more prevalent than transnational trafficking and the majority of victims were children. Within the country, women and children were trafficked from rural provinces to towns and mining areas for domestic servitude, sexual exploitation, and forced labor in diamond mines, petty trading, petty crime, and for forced begging. Women and children may also have been trafficked for forced labor in agriculture and the fishing industry. Transnationally, Sierra Leonean women and children were trafficked to other West African countries, notably Guinea, Côte d'Ivoire, Liberia, Nigeria, Guinea-Bissau, and The Gambia for the same purposes listed above and to North Africa, the Middle East, and Western Europe for domestic servitude and sexual exploitation. Sierra Leone was a destination country for children trafficked from Nigeria and possibly from Liberia and Guinea for forced begging, forced labor in mines and as porters, and for sexual exploitation. There were also cases of children trafficked from refugee communities in Sierra Leone.

In 2008 the Government of Sierra Leone did not fully comply with the minimum standards for the elimination of trafficking; however, it made significant efforts to do so, despite limited resources. The government reported that it prosecuted five traffickers, but was unable to provide data on trafficking convictions. While Sierra Leone reported that it referred victims to an international organization's shelter, the number of victims referred was low.

The country ratified the 2000 UN TIP Protocol in August 2014.

The U.S. State Department's Office to Monitor and Combat Trafficking in Persons placed the country in "Tier 2" in 2017 and 2023

== Prosecution (2008) ==
The Government of Sierra Leone made modest law enforcement efforts to combat trafficking in the last year. Legislatively, Sierra Leone prohibits all forms of trafficking through its 2005 Anti-Trafficking in Persons Act, which prescribes a maximum penalty of 10 years imprisonment. This penalty is stringent, but not commensurate with penalties for rape, which carry a maximum sentence of life imprisonment. Between January and December 2007, the government reported that it conducted 14 trafficking investigations. Five of these cases are being prosecuted—as compared with seven cases prosecuted in 2006. Although an international NGO reported that Sierra Leone convicted three traffickers, the government was unable to corroborate this information. In January 2008, the Sierra Leonean Embassy in Conakry received from the Guinean government four Sierra Leonean women whom Guinean authorities suspected of trafficking children to Sierra Leone, and transported them back to Sierra Leone. Rather than prosecuting them, the government and the International Organization for Migration (IOM) determined that the women were actually trafficking victims and returned them to their communities.

== Protection (2008) ==
The Sierra Leonean government demonstrated limited efforts to protect trafficking victims last year. The government does not operate its own shelter, but refers victims to the nation's only trafficking victim shelter located in Freetown and operated by IOM. The Family Support Units (FSU) of the Sierra Leone Police (SLP) turned over intercepted trafficking victims to the Ministry of Social Welfare (MOSW), which then referred the victims to IOM for assistance. Some victims outside Freetown were not referred for care, however, due to lack of transport to the capital or the difficulty of travel during the rainy season. The government reported that it referred 14 trafficking victims to IOM for assistance in the 2007 calendar year. In January 2007, the Sierra Leonean Embassy in Conakry received from the Guinean government and protected 10 suspected child trafficking victims and returned them to Sierra Leone. The MOSW and IOM determined that the children were in fact not trafficking victims, but were related to the aforementioned four Sierra Leonean women whom Guinean authorities had suspected were trafficking these children into Sierra Leone. The children were reunited with their parents under the supervision of the MOSW.

In March 2008, the government donated shelter space to IOM in order to replace the facility IOM currently rents. Although the government permits victims to participate in investigations and prosecutions, cases take so long to go to court that many victims are no longer available at the time of trial. As a result, some cases are dropped, since many cannot be successfully tried without a victim witness. The government does not actively encourage victims to participate in investigations and prosecutions. Sierra Leone does not provide legal alternatives to the removal of foreign victims to countries where they face hardship or retribution. There were no known cases during the year of trafficking victims being inappropriately incarcerated or fined for unlawful acts as a direct result of being trafficked. However, authorities' conflation of trafficking and smuggling has probably led to some trafficking victims being penalized as illegal immigrants. Also, NGOs report that police raid brothels and arrest females engaged in prostitution without following procedures to identify trafficking victims among them.

== Prevention (2008) ==
The Government of Sierra Leone made inadequate efforts to raise awareness about trafficking during the reporting period. The government failed to conduct trafficking information or education campaigns. While the National Anti-Trafficking Task Force, which is composed of government officials, NGOs, and international organizations, met monthly for half the year, meetings were less frequent in the year's second half and government authorities from some key ministries rarely attended. While the 2005 anti-trafficking law mandates the creation of a Trafficking Secretariat to coordinate national anti-trafficking activities, it has yet to be established. Sierra Leone does not monitor immigration and emigration patterns for trafficking activity. Border officials continue to lack a full understanding of the distinction between smuggling and trafficking. The government took some measures to reduce demand for commercial sex acts by raiding brothels, but did not follow procedures to identify trafficking victims among females in prostitution.
