= Human trafficking in Trinidad and Tobago =

Trinidad and Tobago ratified the 2000 UN TIP Protocol in November 2007.

In 2008, the country was a destination, source, and transit country for women and children subjected to trafficking in persons, specifically forced prostitution, and children and men in conditions of forced labor. Some women and girls from Colombia, Dominican Republic, Venezuela, and Suriname who had been in prostitution in Trinidadian brothels and clubs were identified as trafficking victims. Trinidadian trafficking victims were identified in the United Kingdom and the United States. Undocumented economic migrants from the region and from Asia may have been vulnerable to forced labor and forced prostitution. As a hub for regional travel, Trinidad and Tobago was also a potential transit point for trafficking victims traveling to Caribbean and South American destinations.

The Government of Trinidad and Tobago did not fully comply with the minimum standards for the elimination of trafficking; however, it made significant efforts to do so. Despite these efforts, Trinidad and Tobago was placed on the Tier 2 Watch List in 2010 because the government did not show progress in prosecuting and punishing trafficking crimes and protecting trafficking victims, whom the government often jailed and deported. The government's formation of a working group to substantively address its human trafficking problem portends good prospects for future improvements, and if effective legislation were adopted and enforced, the government would be poised to take the further steps in prosecuting trafficking cases and identifying and assisting victims.

The U.S. State Department's Office to Monitor and Combat Trafficking in Persons placed the country in "Tier 2" in 2017. It was on the Tier 2 Watch List in 2023.

In 2023, the Organised Crime Index noted that while some state officials played a role in carrying out this crime, the country had made progress in fighting it, including setting up a National Action Plan in 2021.

== Prosecution (2008) ==
The anti-trafficking task force, which is co-chaired by an official from the Ministry of National Security in partnership with IOM, has been overseeing the implementation of a nine-month anti-trafficking action plan and organized three subcommittees: one to draft legislation, one to develop victim assistance policies, and a third to raise public awareness; however, the government made no discernible progress in its prosecution and punishment of sex and labor trafficking offenders during the reporting period. The lack of comprehensive legislation that would make human trafficking a crime and would ensure protection of trafficking victims was a significant limitation in the government's ability to prosecute trafficking offenders and address human trafficking in Trinidad and Tobago during the reporting period. The government reported no prosecutions, convictions, or sentences of trafficking offenders. The government reported one trafficking investigation during the year, and it began extradition proceedings in February 2010 against a foreign national wanted for human trafficking in another country. The government provided logistical, human resources, and some financial support to IOM anti-trafficking training for police, immigration officers, police, and other officials during the reporting period.

== Protection (2008) ==
The government made minimal progress in protecting victims during the reporting period. The government did not employ systematic procedures for law enforcement authorities to proactively identify victims and refer them to available services; however, in a positive step, some law enforcement officers are reported to have taken suspected victims to shelters. The task force recently began development of guidelines for officials to refer potential victims to shelter, counseling, medical care, and interpreter assistance. The government did not provide foreign trafficking victims with legal alternatives to their removal to countries where they may face hardship or retribution. The government did not report proactively identifying any victims during the reporting period. NGOs identified foreign trafficking victims in jail for immigration or other violations committed as a direct result of being trafficked that were later deported. The government offered some social services directly and through NGOS that received government funding, but due to a lack of a formal procedures to guide officials in victim identification and referral to services, few victims received assistance. Trinidadian authorities encouraged crime victims in general to assist with the investigation and prosecution of offenders, though without legislation criminalizing human trafficking or formal trafficking victim protection provisions there were few incentives for victims to assist.

== Prevention (2008) ==
The government made some progress in preventing human trafficking during the reporting period through the establishment of the anti-trafficking task force. While the government did not conduct public awareness activities during the reporting period, the responsible subcommittee developed plans to implement a trafficking victim hotline and nationwide information campaign. While prostitution is illegal in Trinidad and Tobago, the government did not take additional measures to reduce the demand for commercial sex acts during the reporting period. Authorities did not consider child sex tourism to be a problem in Trinidad and Tobago during the reporting period and reported no prosecutions related to child sex tourism.

== See also ==
- Human rights in Trinidad and Tobago
