= Human trafficking in the Gambia =

Human trafficking in the Gambia covers ongoing activities in trafficking women and children in the Gambia as forced labor and prostitution.

The Gambia ratified the 2000 UN TIP Protocol in May 2003.

== Background in 2010 ==
The Gambia is a source, transit, and destination country for this type of exploitation. Within the Gambia, women and girls and, to a lesser extent, boys are trafficked for commercial sexual exploitation, as well as for domestic servitude. For generations, parents sent their sons to live with Koranic teachers or marabouts, who more often forced children to beg than ensured their progress in religious studies. However, this practice is declining as the security forces now routinely interrogate the marabout of any beggar they find in the streets. Some observers noted only a small number of trafficking victims, but others see the Gambia's porous borders as an active transit zone for women, girls, and boys from West African countries - mainly Senegal, Sierra Leone, Liberia, Ghana, Nigeria, Guinea, Guinea Bissau, and Benin - who are recruited for exploitation in the sex trade, in particular to meet the demands of European tourists seeking sex with children. Most trafficking offenders in the Gambia are probably individuals who operate independently of international syndicates. The Government's Department of Social Welfare and Tourism Security Unit are compiling electronic databases and conventional lists of trafficking cases, offenders, and victims, which may soon provide a clearer picture of how traffickers operate and how they differ from the migrant smugglers whose cases are now filling the country's courts.

The Government of the Gambia does not fully comply with the minimum standards for the elimination of trafficking; however, it is making significant efforts to do so, despite limited resources. At the highest level, the government acknowledges that trafficking exists in the country. The Gambian government lacks funding and resources to fight trafficking, though it continued to monitor and evaluate the trafficking problem in the country. Every law enforcement agency has anti-trafficking or child protection units. In July 2009, the government took an important step to increase efficiency in law enforcement by adopting a biometric national identity card system called GAMBIS.

== International response ==
The U.S. State Department's Office to Monitor and Combat Trafficking in Persons placed the country in "Tier 2 Watchlist" in 2017. The country was placed at Tier 2 in 2023.

In 2023, the Organised Crime Index noted that the prevalence of the crime had gone down over the past few years, but that this was still carried out along border areas such as Farafenni.

== Prosecution (2010) ==
The Government of the Gambia demonstrated limited progress in its anti-human trafficking law enforcement efforts, resulting in one conviction of a trafficking offender during the reporting period. The Gambia prohibits all forms of trafficking through its October 2007 Trafficking in Persons Act. The law does not differentiate between sexual exploitation and labor exploitation, and prescribes penalties of from 15 years' to life imprisonment, penalties which are sufficiently stringent and commensurate with those prescribed for other serious crimes, such as rape. The Gambia's 2005 Children's Act also prohibits all forms of child trafficking, prescribing a maximum penalty of life imprisonment. In July 2009, a Banjul court convicted a Gambian man of trafficking two children and sentenced him to two years' imprisonment. In June 2009, authorities investigated reports that a group of girls from Ghana had been trafficked to a fishing settlement called "Ghana Town" for exploitation in prostitution. An interagency team of investigators visited the site and found the reports to be inaccurate. The government did not provide specialized anti-trafficking training for law enforcement and immigration officials during the reporting period.

== Protection (2010) ==
The government improved its victim protection efforts during the reporting period. It did not undertake proactive efforts to identify foreign trafficking victims. The government continued to operate a 24-hour shelter, made up of three units with accommodations for 48 victims. The shelter did not receive any trafficked children during 2009. The government maintained and funded a 24-hour hotline number that directly connected callers with two dedicated officers of the Department of Social Welfare. The line was created as a family assistance tool, but was also advertised as an available resource for victims of trafficking. The government maintained a drop-in center for street children, including victims of trafficking, and it provided both the shelter and the drop-in center with an annual budget of about $11,500, in addition to contributions from UNICEF and a faith-based NGO. The government also provided food, medical care, and counseling to all trafficking victims, whether nationals or foreigners. Victims could obtain emergency temporary residence visas under the Trafficking in Persons Act, though none did so during the year.

The government did not identify or assist with the repatriation of any Gambian victims of transnational trafficking during the year. Under the law, however, repatriated nationals were eligible for government-provided care and rehabilitation measures. Gambian authorities identified at least three people that were trafficking victims during the reporting period - two young girls, whose trafficker was prosecuted and imprisoned in July 2009, and a Nigerian girl who reported her trafficking plight to the Child Protection Alliance and the Police Child Welfare Officer in October. The two children were returned to their parents, but the Nigerian girl disappeared. There was no formal system for proactively identifying victims of trafficking, but law enforcement and border control officers who were alert to trafficking situations more intensively questioned adults who arrived at the border with children. There were not enough active trafficking cases to make an assessment about respect for victims' rights, but if trafficking was suspected or identified, Social Welfare would likely have interceded and no victim would have been prosecuted or fined.

Training conducted throughout the year attempted to give security officers the ability to identify and assist potential trafficking victims. There was only one reported case of a victim assisting the authorities in investigation. The government undertook efforts to train and further educate officials in recognizing human trafficking situations and victims. During the year, the government designated officers within each major police station to be responsible for assisting and counseling any potential trafficking victims. However, the government provided no information on such training for Gambian embassies and consulates in foreign countries.

== Prevention (2010) ==
The Government of the Gambia sustained moderate efforts to prevent trafficking through awareness-raising during the reporting period. The government previously supported anti-trafficking and information campaigns, most conducted by NGOs, but reported few such campaigns in 2009. Government-controlled media continued to publicize the dangers of trafficking. There was no comprehensive analysis of emigration and immigration patterns for evidence of trafficking. In December 2009, the government dissolved its multiagency National Task Force for Combating Trafficking in Persons and allocated approximately $111,000 to finance the establishment of the new National Agency to Combat Trafficking in Persons, which was designated to implement the national anti-trafficking plan of action. The government's Tourism Security Unit (TSU) effectively patrolled the Tourism Development Area - the zone most frequented by tourists - to combat child sex tourism and reduce the demand for commercial sex acts. The TSU continued to enforce a 2005 ban on unattended children visiting the tourist resort areas and remitted them to the custody of the Department of Social Welfare. Police sometimes arrested persons suspected of engaging in prostitution. However, these measures were not strong deterrents, and reflected the common perception that prostitution was meeting the needs of tourists who drove a major part of the country's economy. In March 2009, the government convicted a New Zealand national of child pornography and sentenced him to one year's imprisonment; he was acquitted of child defilement charges. Child sex tourism was a problem in the Gambia, but the authorities did not report any prosecution or convictions of child sex tourists during the reporting period. The Gambian government provided its troops with antihuman trafficking training, including warnings against committing any immoral behavior that may bring their force into disrepute, prior to their deployment abroad on international peacekeeping missions.
