= Human trafficking in Luxembourg =

In 2008 Luxembourg was a destination country for women trafficked transnationally for the purpose of commercial sexual exploitation. During the reporting period, women were trafficked from Bulgaria and Ukraine. According to the Luxembourg Red Cross, an increasing number of women from Africa and Latin America were engaged in prostitution in the country, and could be victims of trafficking.

The Government of Luxembourg fully complied with the minimum standards for the elimination of trafficking. The government improved its law enforcement efforts by sentencing and convicting more traffickers during the reporting period and took steps to address child sex tourism.

The U.S. State Department's Office to Monitor and Combat Trafficking in Persons placed the country in "Tier 1" in 2017 and 2023.

Luxembourg ratified the 2000 UN TIP Protocol on 20 April 2009.

Between 2018 and 2021, the government formally identified 20 victims, all brought to Luxembourg from other countries.

In 2023, the Organised Crime Index gave the country a score of 3.5 out of 10 for human trafficking.

== Prosecution (2008) ==
In 2007, the government demonstrated strong law enforcement efforts to combat trafficking. During the reporting period, it convicted and sentenced six human traffickers on charges of procuring prostitution, human trafficking, and smuggling. Sentences ranged from one to three years’ imprisonment and included fines. Article 379 of the penal code specifically criminalizes trafficking for the purpose of sexual exploitation, but does not explicitly address trafficking for purposes of forced labor. Forced labor is nonetheless criminalized in Luxembourg via its 1996 ratification of the European Social Charter. Penalties prescribed by Article 379 are sufficiently stringent and commensurate with penalties for rape. The government continued its ongoing training aimed at police, immigration, and other government officials and non-governmental organizations (NGOs) on victim identification. There was no evidence of trafficking complicity by Luxembourg public officials.

== Protection (2008) ==
The Government of Luxembourg continued to offer adequate protection to identified trafficking victims in 2007. The government encourages victims to participate in a criminal investigation and, through its funding of two domestic NGOs, provides shelter, protection, and assistance to victims. The government’s specialized police anti-trafficking unit reported that Luxembourg’s legal commercial sex trade was a likely catalyst for trafficking and closely monitored the prostitution sector for evidence of trafficking. A 2007 report issued by the government estimated there were up to 500 women in prostitution in Luxembourg. While victims are not punished for unlawful acts committed as a direct result of their being trafficked, women in prostitution who are in the country illegally are often deported or imprisoned, and the government did not provide evidence that it systematically checked these women for trafficking indicators. The government did not establish a network to coordinate care for victims of trafficking, planned in 2006.

== Prevention (2008) ==
In 2007, the Ministry of Equal Opportunity conducted various symposia to publicize the negative effects of the commercial sex trade; however, it did not conduct any specific anti-trafficking awareness campaigns to prevent trafficking within the legal sex industry in Luxembourg during the reporting period. In 2007, the government co-funded and launched a campaign with ECPAT to prevent its nationals from engaging in child sex tourism abroad. The campaign created a special e-mail address to receive tips and disseminated posters and leaflets through travel agencies, at the national airport, at hospitals, and in municipal buildings.
