= Human trafficking in Venezuela =

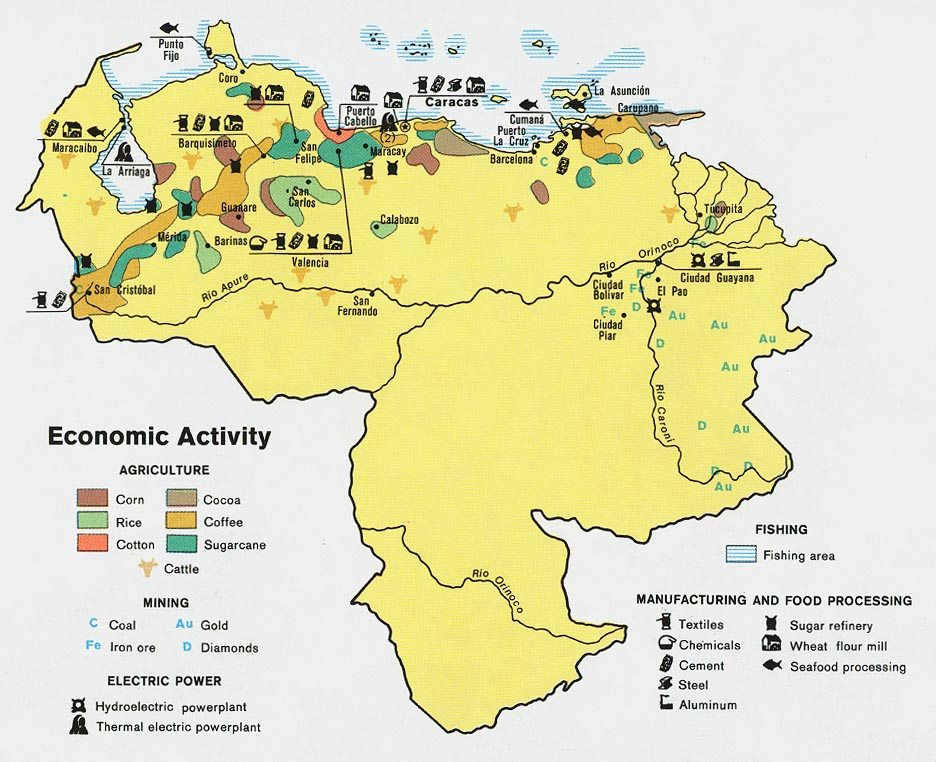
A map of Venezuela and its economic activity

In 2011 Venezuela was a source, transit, and destination country for men, women, and children trafficked for the purposes of commercial sexual exploitation and forced labor. Venezuela's political, economic, and social concerns contributed to the factors and types of human trafficking in the country. In particular, the severe poverty in Venezuela has increased the rate of human trafficking. Venezuelan women and girls are trafficked within the country for sexual exploitation, lured from poor regions in the nation's interior to urban and tourist areas. Victims are recruited through false job offers and subsequently forced into prostitution or conditions of labor exploitation. Child prostitution in urban areas and child sex tourism in resort destinations such as Margarita Island appear to be growing. Venezuelan women and girls are trafficked for commercial sexual exploitation to Western Europe and Mexico, in addition to Caribbean destinations such as Trinidad and Tobago, Aruba, and the Dominican Republic. Men, women, and children from Colombia, Peru, Ecuador, Brazil, the Dominican Republic, and the People's Republic of China are trafficked to and through Venezuela and may be subjected to commercial sexual exploitation and forced labor.

The country ratified the 2000 TIP Protocol in May 2002.

In June 2014 the United States named Venezuela as one of four countries it signaled out as not doing enough to prevent human trafficking. In its annual Trafficking in Persons report, the U.S. said it had lowered Venezuela's ranking to Tier 3, the lowest grade possible. Since Venezuela was ranked within Tier 3, it risked being subject to certain sanctions and could lose non-humanitarian and non-trade-related aid from the United States.

The U.S. State Department's Office to Monitor and Combat Trafficking in Persons placed the country in "Tier 3" in 2017, a category for countries whose governments do not fully comply with the minimum standards and are not making significant efforts to do so. The country was still at Tier 3 in 2023.

In 2023, the Organised Crime Index gave the country a score of 7.50 out of 10 for human trafficking, with people mainly being moved to Colombia and Chile, but also to the Caribbean islands.

== Causes ==
Human trafficking in Venezuela is shaped by its political, economic, and social environment.

=== Political causes ===
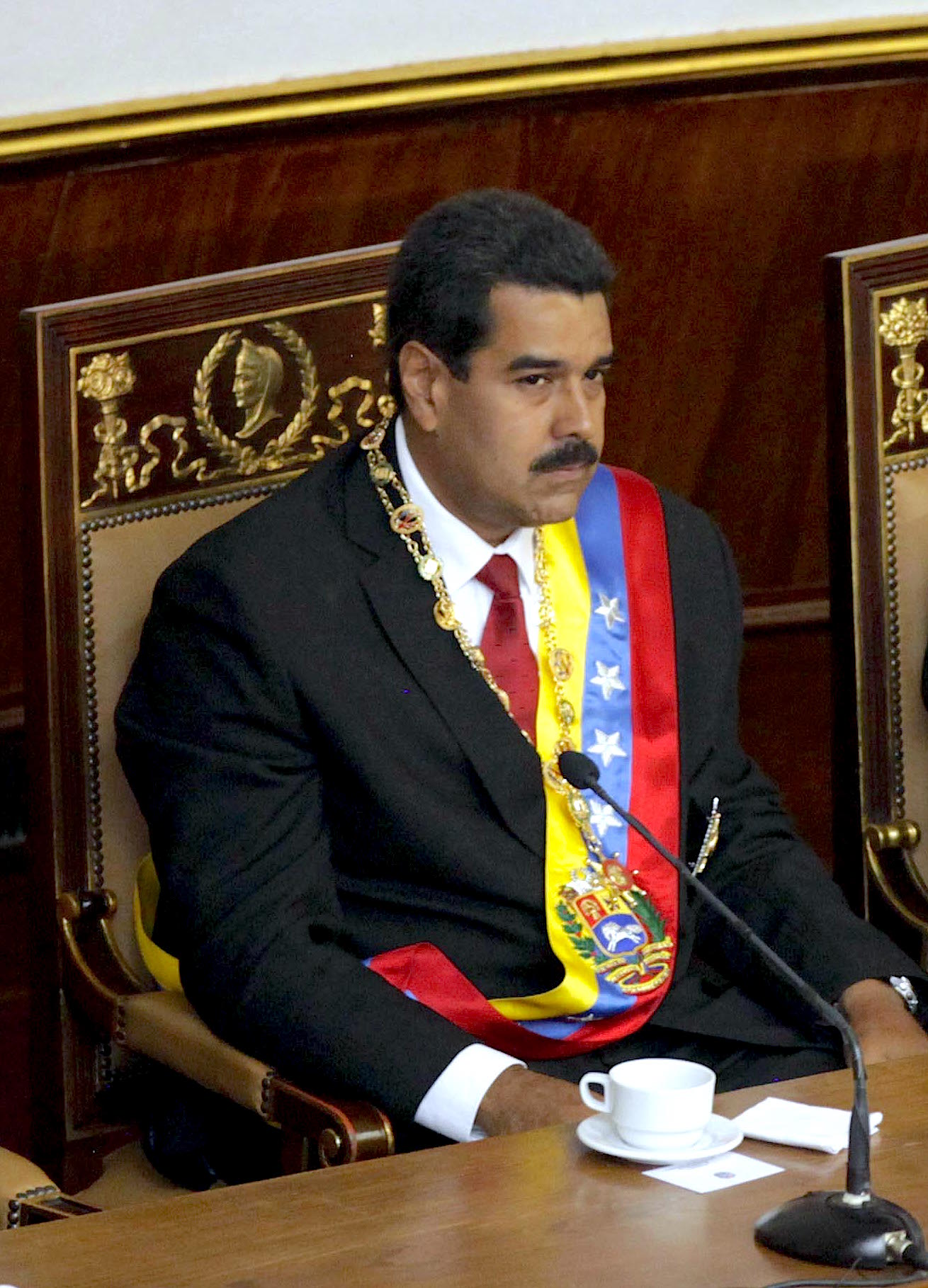
Nicolås Maduro, the current President of Venezuela

Politically, in order for human trafficking to "thrive the slave trade requires the direct or indirect involvement of national governments, at both the source and the destination." In addition, according to a statistical study conducted by Kevin Bales, a scholar of modern slavery and trafficking, the level of corruption and instability in a country is a major factor in the rate of human trafficking. Venezuelan policy on human trafficking, therefore, impacts the overall rate of the issue and the regulation of it. In addition, as political instability in Venezuela persists, and the opposition party to Nicolás Maduro continues to "openly and repeatedly [push] for regime change by any means necessary," the policy platform on human trafficking is not being dealt with.

According to the U.S. Department of State, In 2008 Venezuela released minimal information on its efforts to combat the issue. Public corruption "especially complicity between law enforcement and border agents with traffickers and alien smugglers," make it difficult to enact legislation on the issue because of its current governmental instability. After the reelection of Maduro, the Venezuela's political climate created drastic partisanship, causing many policy issues to be ignored.

In addition, while political measures have been introduced in Venezuela to combat sexual violence and human trafficking, many of these measures have not been enforced and implemented throughout the country. As a result, political efforts to combat human trafficking, or lack thereof, can serve as a factor in itself on one of the reasons human trafficking continues to persist throughout the country. In 2017, it was noted that unless Venezuela takes a definite effort to combat human trafficking through political platforms, it is likely that the country will remain a tier 3 country on the U.S. State Department's report for the worst countries of human trafficking in the world.

=== Economic causes ===
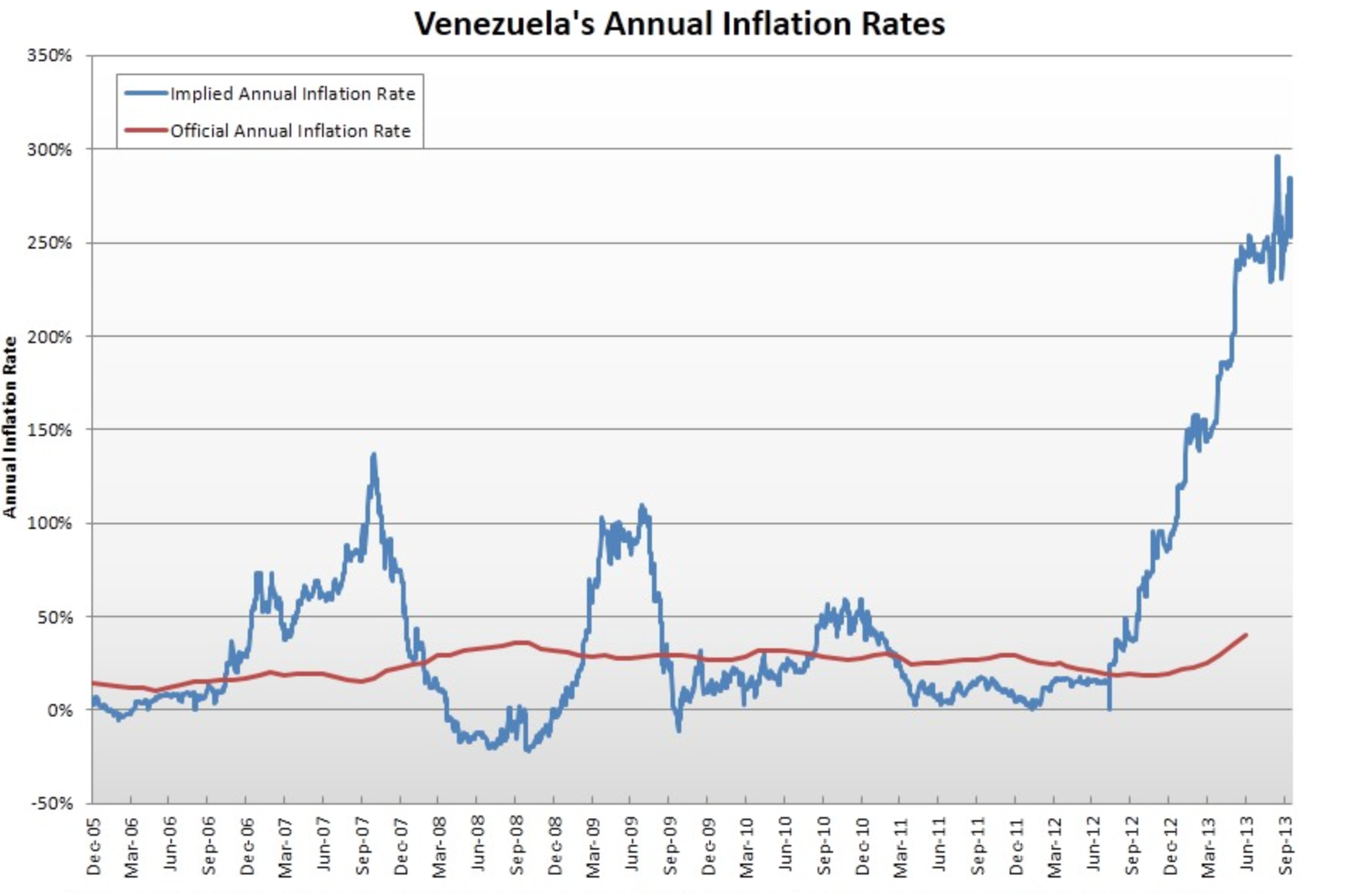
The rise of inflation in Venezuela contributing to its current economic hardship

Venezuela's current economy makes it difficult to enact structural changes that would combat human trafficking. In fact, with "international reserves under USD 11.0 billion and a strong repayment commitment by the socialist government" Venezuela's economic hardship predicted to worsen. In fact, inflation in Venezuela is rising at record-breaking rates "which spiked above 68 percent last year and may reach 100 percent." The country has also been categorized as one of the most miserable economies in the world, based on the Global Misery Index, which is not only impacting the crime in the country but causing thousands of individuals and families to take steps toward emigrating. As the prices of basic consumer goods rise at incredible rates, the basic economic status of everyday families continues to deflate, which perpetuates factors of human trafficking.

In particular, human trafficking is "explained by the extreme poverty, recent and massive rural to urban migration, the large numbers of conflicts, the low status of women, and the endurance of traditional rituals and beliefs." As Venezuela continually suffers from economic hardship, the country does not have the vast economic means necessary to confront "the vital and urgent human needs derived from poverty," including infrastructure, transportation, public services housing, urban and rural land use, takes and finances; citizen security and legal security and the socio-economic system. The economic state of Venezuela inherently impacts its political and social capability to fundamentally address and alleviate factors that lead to human trafficking.

=== Social causes ===
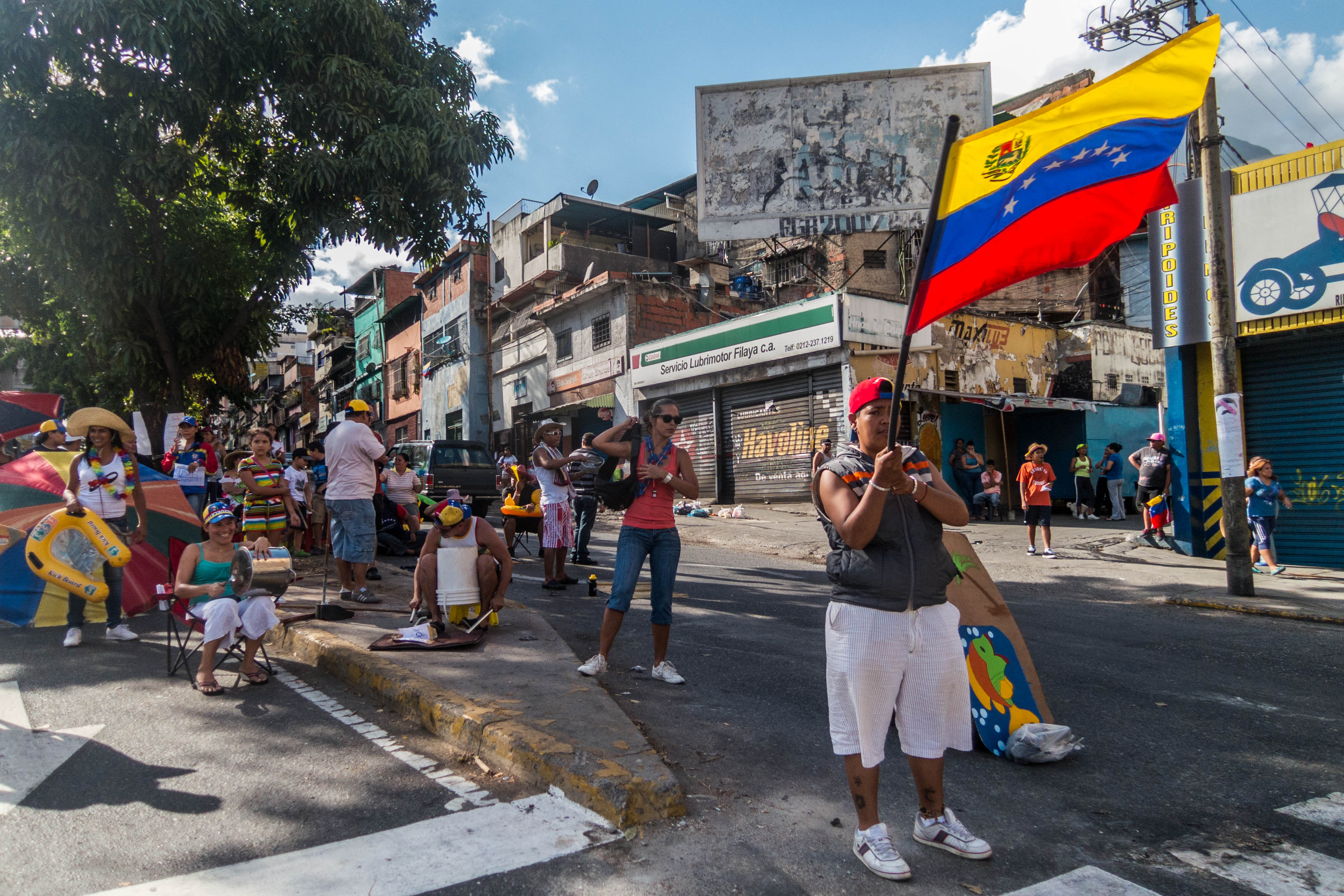
2014 protests in Venezuela

Social concerns in Venezuela also contribute to the rate of human trafficking in the country. In particular, gender inequality in Venezuela makes it more likely for women and children to be central targets. In fact, in many cases, victims are recruited through false job offers, and many women fall for these offers because of how difficult it is for women to make a liveable and equal wage and be hired at all. In a 2011 Congressional Research Report by Clare Ribando Seelke another social cause of human trafficking in the country is due to the "lingering machismo (chauvinistic attitudes and practices) that tends to lead to discrimination against women and girls." The social unrest in Venezuela is also contributing to a higher crime rate, and more and more people feel unsafe and unprotected by the government. The wave of protests in Venezuela are the worst in over a decade, and contributing to worsened political stability, thus, social instability in homes and workplaces throughout the country as a whole.

In addition to gendered social issues, other individual factors that contribute to the rise of human trafficking include "poverty, unemployment, illiteracy, history of physical or sexual abuse, homelessness, drug use, and gang membership." These factors, which are worsened in Venezuela due to its current economic hardship, directly correlate with higher rates of human trafficking in the country at large.

== Prosecution (2008) ==
In March 2007, the Venezuelan government enacted the Organic Law on the Right of Women to a Violence-Free Life. Article 56 of the new law prohibits the trafficking of women, girls, and adolescents for purposes of sexual exploitation, prostitution, forced labor, or slavery, and prescribes punishments of 15 to 20 years' imprisonment. Articles 46 and 47 of the new law prohibit forced prostitution and sexual slavery and carry penalties of 15 to 20 years' imprisonment. This legislation closed a gap in Venezuelan law, in which the internal trafficking of adults was not prohibited. However, despite the policy efforts to combat human trafficking, many of the promises laid out in the Organic Law on the Right of Women to a Violence-Free Life were ignored. In particular, the Supreme Court of Justice (Tribunal Supremo de Justicia, TSJ) announced that it would begin creating over 92 specialized courts throughout the country that would help prosecute cases of human trafficking and sexual violence. However, according to a later press release published in February 2008 by Venezuela's Ombudsman's Office (Defensoria del Pueblo), the TSJ announced it would only set up 7 courts instead of the originally proposed 92. Furthermore, Country Reports on Human Rights Practices for 2007 examines the new law, but "it does not provide information about efforts to implement it". As a result, despite the public efforts of Venezuela to pass the Organic Law on the Right of Women to a Violence-Free Life, many of the policy elements were never fully implemented, if at all.

In addition to the lack of concrete measures to enforce and implement the Organize Law on the Right of Women to a Violence-Free Life, the policy provisions do not address the trafficking of adult males or boys. Article 16 of the Organic Law Against Organized Crime, enacted in 2005, prohibits trafficking across international borders for labor or sexual exploitation, and prescribes penalties ranging from 10 to 18 years imprisonment. Provisions of Venezuela's 2004 Naturalization and Immigration Law criminalize transnational trafficking for labor exploitation, prescribing punishments of four to 10 years imprisonment. The above penalties are commensurate with those for other grave crimes. The Child Protection Act and various articles of Venezuela's penal code can be used to prosecute internal trafficking of minors, but many of these statutes carry extremely low penalties, mostly fines. Within the few laws that Venezuela has regarding human trafficking, the issue is typically only limited to women and children, and there are no deliberate measures meant to combat human trafficking of men. As a result, the issue has been framed in the country as a gender-specific one, when, at least 18% of men are victims of human trafficking.

During 2007, the government opened two criminal investigations against three trafficking suspects in Caracas; these cases were pending as of 2008. As of 2007, government officials reported that an additional 12 trafficking-related investigations remained open from previous years. The actual number of trafficking investigations is difficult to determine since the government may not be distinguishing between human trafficking and alien smuggling crimes. No convictions or sentences against trafficking offenders were reported in 2007. Police indicate that some trafficking victims are reluctant to press charges due to long court delays and fear of reprisals from their traffickers. International organizations indicate that the government cooperates with Interpol on some transnational trafficking cases, and has increased screening for potential trafficking situations at airports and border checkpoints after receiving UNHCR-sponsored training last year. As of 2008, the government was investigating an immigration official for trafficking-related complicity. Corruption among other public officials, particularly related to the issuance of false identity documents, appeared to be widespread.

== Protection (2008) ==
As of 2008, the Venezuelan government did not operate shelters dedicated to trafficking victims, and relied on NGOs to provide the bulk of victim assistance without government funding. Government-provided psychological and medical examinations were available for trafficking victims, but comprehensive victim services such as counseling, follow-up medical assistance, job training, and reintegration assistance were generally unavailable. The government operates a national hotline through which it receives trafficking complaints and refers trafficking victims to NGOs for care. The government reported assisting 22 trafficking victims in 2007, in addition to collaborating with IOM to repatriate two Venezuelan victims who had been trafficked to Switzerland and Mexico. However, since the Venezuelan government does not have policy provisions in place to help protect against human trafficking of men, many of these resources only help women and children. The lack of a secure witness protection program discouraged some victims from assisting with the investigation and prosecution of their traffickers. According to NGOs, the government does not have a formal mechanism for identifying trafficking victims among prostituted persons in the nation's commercial sex trade. As of 2008, there were no reports of victims being jailed or penalized for crimes committed as a result of being trafficked. The government provides some legal protection for the resettlement of foreign victims to third countries if it appears they may face hardship or retribution if returned to their country of origin.

== Prevention (2008) ==
The government acknowledges that human trafficking is a problem in Venezuela, but views the country as principally a transit point. Nonetheless, the government has increased efforts to reduce demand for commercial sex acts and to raise public awareness about the dangers of human trafficking by airing public service announcements and widely distributing posters and pamphlets against commercial sexual exploitation, forced labor, and child sex tourism, and advertising the government's hotline number. The government also reported shutting down a hotel on Margarita Island, which had been advertised in the United Kingdom as a destination for sex tourism and harboring. It has also sponsored a large number of nationwide anti-trafficking workshops and training programs for police officers and other government officials. The government has partnered with UNICEF to continue to draft a national anti-trafficking action plan, and collaborated with NGOs and international organizations on other anti-trafficking efforts, but relations with these organizations are reported to be uneven. Moreover, high turnover in official personnel appears to have hampered some of the government's overall anti-trafficking efforts. Many of its anti-trafficking efforts have been short-lived, and due to economic instability, underfunded and abandoned.
