= Trafficking in Persons Report =

Annual report by U.S. State Department

The TIP Report on a map based on 2021 data

The number of trafficking victims in EU countries in 2022

The Trafficking in Persons Report, or the TIP Report, is an annual report issued since 2001 by the U.S. State Department's Office to Monitor and Combat Trafficking in Persons. It ranks governments based on their perceived efforts to acknowledge and combat human trafficking.

== Trafficking victims ==
The map presents the distribution of human trafficking victims across different forms of exploitation within the European Union in 2022. Germany reported the highest number of victims, totaling 992, whereas Slovenia reported the lowest count, with only 3 victims. The data has been sourced from Eurostat, the official statistics office of the European Union.

== Ranking system ==
The report divides nations into tiers based on their compliance with standards outlined in the Victims of Trafficking and Violence Protection Act of 2000 (TVPA). These tiers are:

- Tier 1 countries whose governments fully comply with the TVPA's minimum standards.
- Tier 2 countries whose governments do not fully comply with all of TVPA’s minimum standards, but are making significant efforts to bring themselves into compliance with those standards.
- Tier 2 watchlist countries whose governments do not fully comply with the TVPA’s minimum standards, but are making significant efforts to bring themselves into compliance with those standards and:
  - The absolute number of victims of severe forms of trafficking is very significant or is significantly increasing; or
  - There is a failure to provide evidence of increasing efforts to combat severe forms of trafficking in persons from the previous year; or
  - The determination that a country is making significant efforts to bring themselves into compliance with minimum standards was based on commitments by the country to take additional future steps over the next year.
- Tier 3 countries whose governments do not fully comply with the minimum standards and are not making significant efforts to do so.

There are also a few special cases (Special Tier) such as Yemen, where their civil conflict and humanitarian crisis make gaining information difficult; and Sint Maarten, where the devastation caused by Hurricane Irma has made reporting difficult.

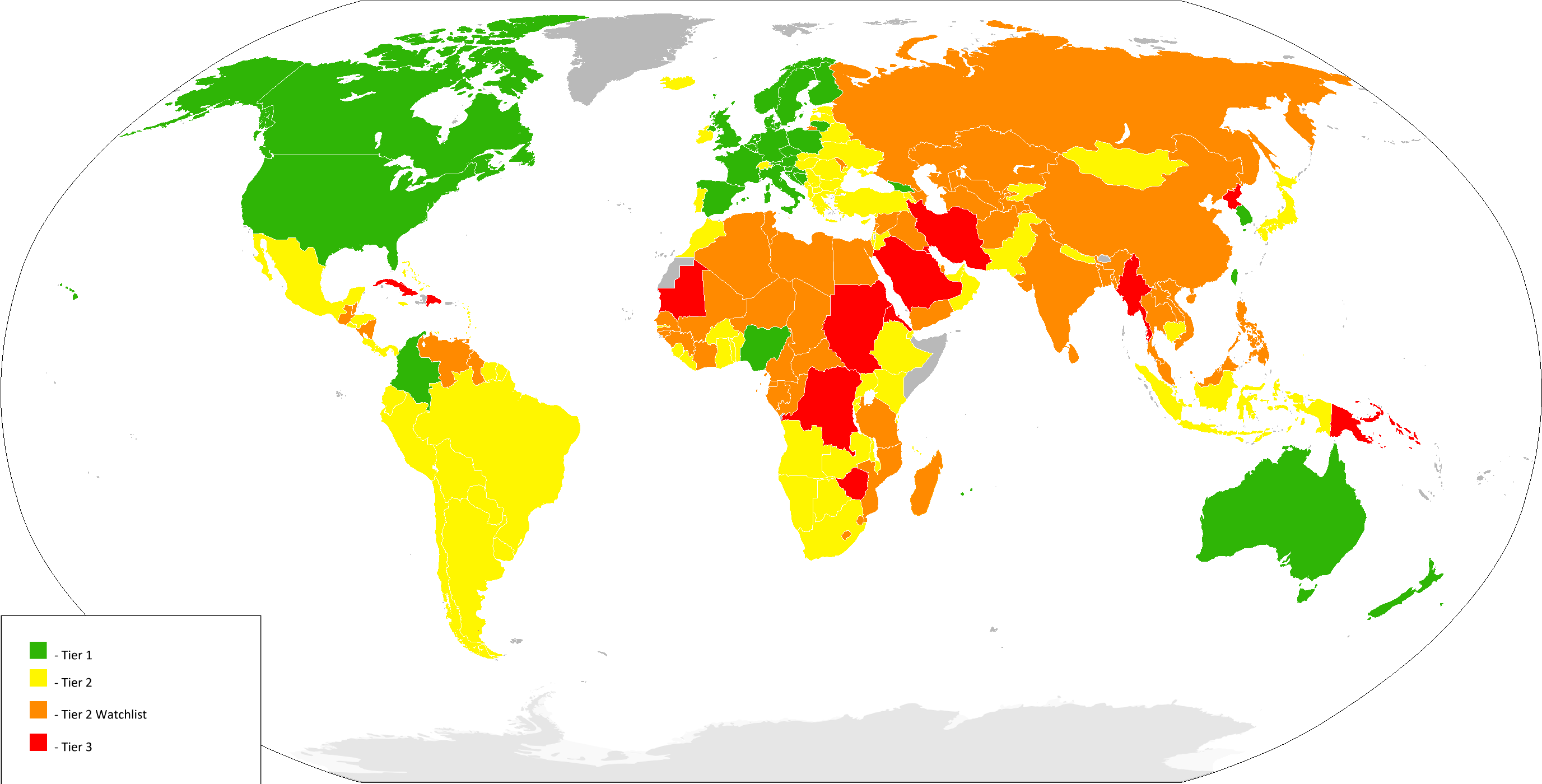
Findings of the legislative framework in place in different countries to prevent/reduce human trafficking (the findings are from the 2010 Department of State Trafficking in Persons Report)

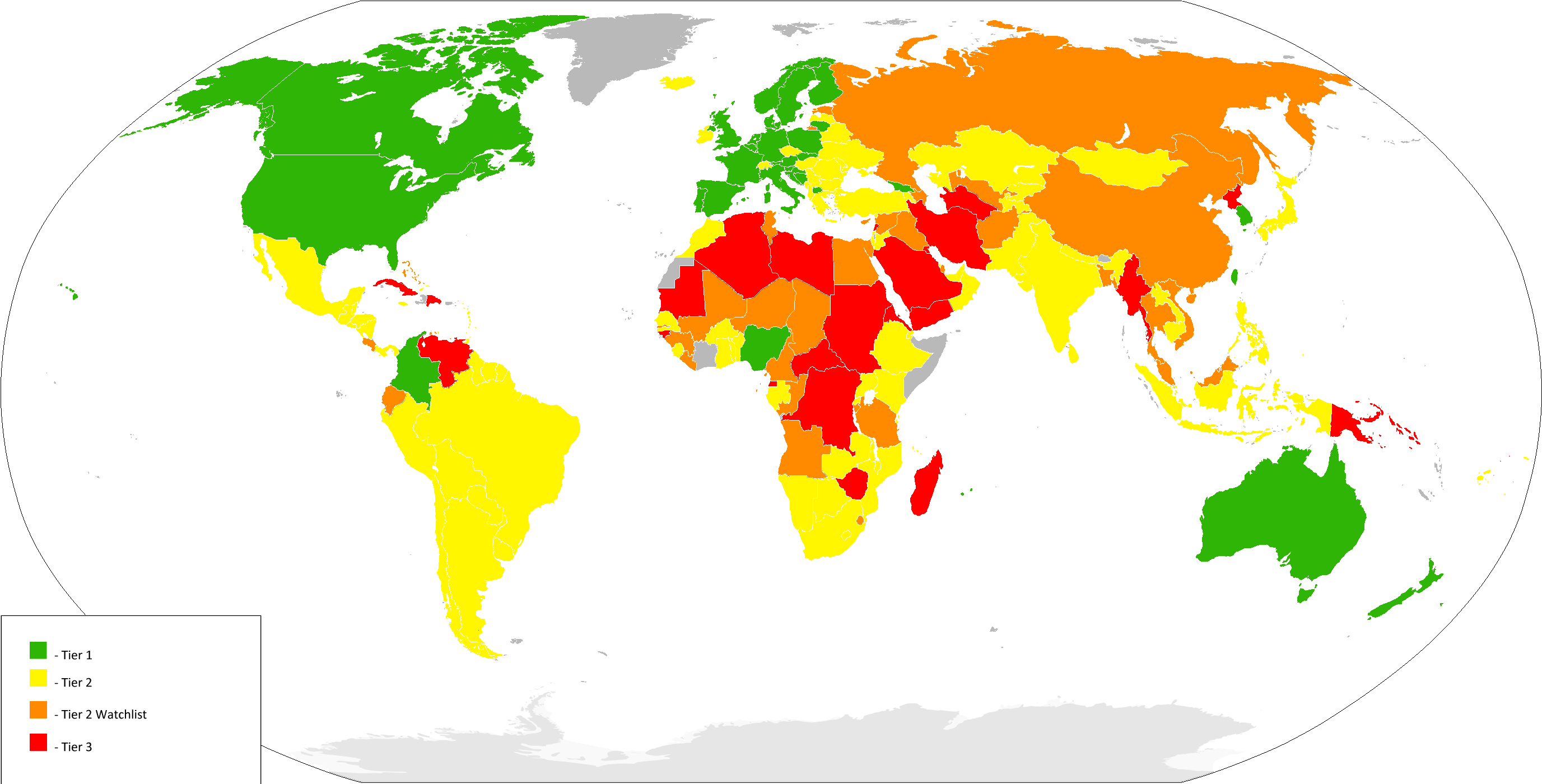
Findings of the legislative framework in place in different countries to prevent/reduce human trafficking (the findings are from the 2011 Department of State Trafficking in Persons Report)

Trafficking in Persons Report tier placements (Note: Tier designations: Tier 1: Countries whose governments fully comply with the Trafficking Victims Protection Act's (TVPA) minimum standards.; Tier 2: Countries whose governments do not fully comply with the TVPA’s minimum standards, but are making significant efforts to bring themselves into compliance with those standards.; Tier 2 Watch List: Countries whose governments do not fully comply with the TVPA's minimum standards, but are making significant efforts to bring themselves into compliance with those standards AND: a) The absolute number of victims of severe forms of trafficking is very significant or is significantly increasing; or b) There is a failure to provide evidence of increasing efforts to combat severe forms of trafficking in persons from the previous year; or c) The determination that a country is making significant efforts to bring itself into compliance with minimum standards was based on commitments by the country to take additional future steps over the next year.: Tier 3: Countries whose governments neither fully comply with the minimum standards nor are making significant efforts to do so.)
Country	Location	2011	2012	2013	2014	2015	2016	2017	2018	2019	2020	2021	2023	Main article
Afghanistan	Central Asia	2w	2w	2w	2	2	2w	2	2	2w	3	3	3	Human trafficking in Afghanistan
Albania	Southeast Europe	2	2	2w	2	2	2	2	2	2	2	2	2	Human trafficking in Albania
Algeria	Northeast Africa	3	3	3	3	3	3	2w	2w	2w	3	3	3	Human trafficking in Algeria
Angola	Central Africa	2w	2w	2w	2w	2	2	2	2w	2w	2	2	2	Human trafficking in Angola
Antigua and Barbuda	Caribbean Sea	2	2	2w	2	2w	2w	2w	2	2	2	2	2	Human trafficking in Antigua and Barbuda
Argentina	South America	2	2	2	2	2	2	2	1	1	1	1	1	Human trafficking in Argentina
Armenia	Eurasia	2	2	1	1	1	1	1	2	2	2w	2	2	Human trafficking in Armenia
Aruba	Caribbean Sea	2	2	2	2	2	2	2	1	2	2w	2w	2	
Australia	Oceania	1	1	1	1	1	1	1	1	1	1	1	1	Human trafficking in Australia
Austria	Central Europe	1	1	1	1	1	1	1	1	1	1	1	1	Human trafficking in Austria
Azerbaijan	Eurasia	2w	2w	2	2	2	2	2	2	2w	2w	2w	2	Human trafficking in Azerbaijan
Bahamas	Atlantic Ocean	2w	2w	2	2	1	1	1	1	1	1	1	1	Human trafficking in the Bahamas
Bahrain	Western Asia	2	2w	2w	2w	2	2	2	1	1	1	1	1	Human trafficking in Bahrain
Bangladesh	South Asia	2w	2	2	2	2	2	2w	2w	2w	2	2	2	Human trafficking in Bangladesh
Barbados	Lesser Antilles	2w	2w	2w	2	2	2	2	2	2w	2w	2w	2	Human trafficking in Barbados
Belarus	Eastern Europe	2	2w	2w	2w	3	3	3	3	3	3	2w	3	Human trafficking in Belarus
Belgium	Western Europe	1	1	1	1	1	1	1	1	1	1	1	1	Human trafficking in Belgium
Belize	Central America	2	2	2	2w	3	3	3	3	2w	2w	2w	2	Human trafficking in Belize
Benin	West Africa	2	2	2	2	2	2w	2w	2	2	2	2	2	Human trafficking in Benin
Bhutan	South Asia	-	-	2	2	2	2	2	2w	3	2w	2w	2	
Bolivia	South America	2	2	2	2w	2w	2w	2w	3	2w	2	2	2w	Human trafficking in Bolivia
Bosnia and Herzegovina	Central / Southeast Europe	1	2	2	2w	2	2	2	2w	2w	2w	2	2	Human trafficking in Bosnia and Herzegovina
Botswana	Southern Africa	2	2	2	2w	2w	2	2	2	2	2	2	2w	Human trafficking in Botswana
Brazil	South America	2	2	2	2	2	2	2	2	2	2	2	2	Human trafficking in Brazil
Brunei	Southeast Asia	2w	2	2	2	2	2	2	2	2w	2w	2w	2w	Human trafficking in Brunei
Bulgaria	Eastern Europe	2	2	2	2	2w	2w	2w	2	2	2	2	2w	Human trafficking in Bulgaria
Burkina Faso	Western Africa	2	2	2	2	2w	2	2w	2	2	2	2w	2	Human trafficking in Burkina Faso
Burma	Southeast Asia	3	2w	2w	2w	2w	3	2w	3	3	3	3	3	Human trafficking in Burma
Burundi	Eastern Africa	2w	2w	2w	2w	3	3	3	3	3	3	2w	2	Human trafficking in Burundi
Cambodia	Southeast Asia	2	2	2w	2w	2w	2	2	2	2w	2w	2w	3	Human trafficking in Cambodia
Cameroon	Western Africa	2w	2	2	2	2	2w	2w	2	2	2w	2w	2	Human trafficking in Cameroon
Canada	North America	1	1	1	1	1	1	1	1	1	1	1	1	Human trafficking in Canada
Cape Verde	Atlantic Ocean	-	2	2	2	2	2w	2w	2	2	2	2	2	
Central African Republic	Central Africa	3	3	3	3	3	3	3	2w	2w	2	2	2	Human trafficking in the Central African Republic
Chad	Central Africa	2w	2w	2w	2	2	2	2w	2w	2	2w	2w	3	Human trafficking in Chad
Chile	South America	2	2	2	1	1	1	1	1	1	1	1	1	Human trafficking in Chile
China, People's Republic	East Asia	2w	2w	3	2w	2w	2w	3	3	3	3	3	3	Human trafficking in China
Colombia	South America	1	1	1	2	2	1	1	1	1	1	1	1	Human trafficking in Colombia
Comoros	Indian Ocean	2w	2w	2w	2w	3	3	3	3	3	3	3	2	
Congo, Democratic Republic of the	Central Africa	3	3	3	3	2w	2w	3	3	3	2w	2w	2	Human trafficking in the Democratic Republic of the Congo
Congo, Republic of the	Central Africa	2w	2w	2	2	2w	2w	3	3	2w	2	2	2w	Human trafficking in the Republic of the Congo
Costa Rica	Central America	2w	2	2	2	2w	2w	2	2	2	2	2	2	Human trafficking in Costa Rica
Côte d'Ivoire	West Africa	-	2	2	2	2	2w	2	2	2	2	2	2	Human trafficking in Côte d'Ivoire
Croatia	Central Europe	1	1	2	2	2	2	2	2	2	2	2	2	Human trafficking in Croatia
Cuba	Caribbean Sea	3	3	3	3	2w	2w	2w	2w	3	3	3	3	Human trafficking in Cuba
Curaçao	Caribbean Sea	2w	2	2	2	2	2	2	2	2w	2w	2w	3	
Cyprus	Eastern Mediterranean	2w	2	2	2w	2	1	2	1	1	1	2	1	Human trafficking in Cyprus
Czech Republic	Central Europe	2	1	1	1	1	1	1	1	1	1	1	1	Human trafficking in the Czech Republic
Denmark	Northern Europe	1	1	1	1	1	1	1	1	2	2	2	1	Human trafficking in Denmark
Djibouti	Horn of Africa	2	2w	2w	2w	2w	3	2w	2	2	2	2w	3	Human trafficking in Djibouti
Dominican Republic	Hispaniola	3	2	2	2	2	2	2	2	2	2w	2	2w	Human trafficking in the Dominican Republic
Ecuador	South America	2w	2w	2	2	2	2	2	2	2	2	2	2	Human trafficking in Ecuador
Egypt	North Africa	2	2	2	2	2w	2	2	2	2	2	2	2w	Human trafficking in Egypt
El Salvador	Central America	2	2	2	2	2	2	2	2	2	2	2	2w	Human trafficking in El Salvador
Equatorial Guinea	Middle Africa	3	3	3	3	3	3	3	3	3	2w	2w	3	Human trafficking in Equatorial Guinea
Eritrea	Horn of Africa	3	3	3	3	3	3	3	3	3	3	3	3	Human trafficking in Eritrea
Estonia	Northern Europe	2w	2	2	2	2	2	2	1	1	1	1	1	
Eswatini	Southern Africa	2	2	2	2	2	2w	2w	2w	2	2	2	2w	Human trafficking in Eswatini
Ethiopia	Horn of Africa	2	2	2	2	2	2	2	2	2	2	2w	2	Human trafficking in Ethiopia
Fiji	Melanesia	2	2	2	2	2	2	2	2w	2w	2w	2	2	Human trafficking in Fiji
Finland	Northern Europe	1	1	1	1	1	1	1	1	1	1	1	1	Human trafficking in Finland
France	Western Europe	1	1	1	1	1	1	1	1	1	1	1	1	Human trafficking in France
Gabon	Central Africa	2	2	2	2	2w	2w	2w	3	2w	2	2	2w	Human trafficking in Gabon
Gambia	West Africa	2w	2w	2w	3	3	3	2w	2w	3	2w	2w	2	Human trafficking in the Gambia
Georgia	Eurasia	1	1	2	2	2	1	1	1	1	1	1	1	Human trafficking in Georgia
Germany	Western Europe	1	1	1	1	1	1	1	1	2	2	2	1	Human trafficking in Germany
Ghana	West Africa	2	2	2	2	2w	2w	2w	2	2	2	2	2	Human trafficking in Ghana
Greece	Southeast Europe	2	2	2	2	2	2	2	2	2	2	2	2	Human trafficking in Greece
Guatemala	Central America	2	2	2	2	2	2	2w	2w	2	2	2	2	Human trafficking in Guatemala
Guinea	West Africa	2w	2	2w	2w	2w	2w	3	2w	2	2w	2w	2	Human trafficking in Guinea
Guinea-Bissau	West Africa	3	2w	3	3	3	3	3	2w	2w	2w	3	3	Human trafficking in Guinea-Bissau
Guyana	South America	2	2	2w	2w	2w	2	1	1	1	1	1	1	Human trafficking in Guyana
Haiti	Caribbean Sea	-	2w	2w	2w	2w	3	2w	2w	2	2	2w	2w	Human trafficking in Haiti
Honduras	Central America	2	2	2w	2	2	2	2	2	2	2	2	2	Human trafficking in Honduras
Hong Kong (China)	Asia	2	2	2	2	2	2w	2w	2w	2	2w	2w	2	Human trafficking in Hong Kong
Hungary	Central Europe	2	2	2	2	2	2	2w	2w	2w	2	2	2	Human trafficking in Hungary
Iceland	Western Europe / North Atlantic	2	1	1	1	1	1	2	2	2	2	2	1	Human trafficking in Iceland
India	South Asia	2	2	2	2	2	2	2	2	2	2	2	2	Human trafficking in India; See Child trafficking in India
Indonesia	Southeast Asia	2	2	2	2	2	2	2	2	2	2	2	2	Human trafficking in Indonesia
Iran	Central / Western Asia	3	3	3	3	3	3	3	3	3	3	3	3	Human trafficking in Iran
Iraq	Western Asia	2w	2w	2	2	2	2	2w	2w	2w	2	2	2w	Human trafficking in Iraq
Ireland	Europe	1	1	1	1	1	1	1	2	2	2w	2w	2	Human trafficking in Ireland
Israel	Western Asia	2	1	1	1	1	1	1	1	1	1	2	2	Human trafficking in Israel
Italy	Europe	1	1	1	1	1	1	1	1	2	2	2	2	Human trafficking in Italy
Jamaica	Greater Antilles	2	2w	2	2w	2w	2	2	2	2	2	2	2	Human trafficking in Jamaica
Japan	Pacific Ocean	2	2	2	2	2	2	2	1	1	2	2	2	Human trafficking in Japan
Jordan	Western Asia	2	2	2	2	2	2	2	2	2	2w	2	2	Human trafficking in Jordan
Kazakhstan	Eastern Europe / Central Asia	2	2	2	2	2	2	2	2	2w	2w	2	2	Human trafficking in Kazakhstan
Kenya	East Africa	2	2w	2w	2w	2	2	2	2	2	2	2	2	Human trafficking in Kenya
Kiribati	Pacific Ocean	2w	2	2	2	2	2w	2w						Human trafficking in Kiribati
Korea, Democratic People’s Republic of	Eastern Asia	3	3	3	3	3	3	3	3	3	3	3	3	
Korea, Republic of	Eastern Asia	1	1	1	1	1	1	1	1	1	1	1	2	Human trafficking in South Korea
Kosovo	Southeast Europe	2	2	2	2	2	2	2	2	2	2	2	2	Human trafficking in Kosovo
Kuwait	Western Asia	3	3	3	3	3	2w	2w	2w	2	2	2	2w	Human trafficking in Kuwait
Kyrgyzstan	Central Asia	2	2	2	2	2	2	2	2w	2w	2w	2	2	Human trafficking in Kyrgyzstan
Laos	Southeast Asia	2	2	2	2w	2w	2w	2w	3	2w	2	2	2	Human trafficking in Laos
Latvia	Northern Europe	2	2	2	2	2	2	2	2	2	2	2	2	Human trafficking in Latvia
Lebanon	Western Asia	3	2w	2w	2w	2w	2	2	2	2	2	2	2w	Human trafficking in Lebanon
Lesotho	Southern Africa	2	2	2w	2w	2w	2	2	2	2w	3	2w	2	Human trafficking in Lesotho
Liberia	West Africa	2w	2w	2w	2	2	2	2w	2w	2w	2	2w	2	Human trafficking in Liberia
Libya	Northern Africa	3	3	3	3	3								Human trafficking in Libya
Lithuania	Northern Europe	1	1	2	2	2	1	1	1	1	1	1	1	Human trafficking in Lithuania
Luxembourg	Western Europe	1	1	1	1	1	2	1	1	1	1	1	1	Human trafficking in Luxembourg
Macau (China)	Asia	2	2w	2	2	2	2	2w	2w	2	2w	2w	3	Human trafficking in Macau
Madagascar	Indian Ocean	3	3	2w	2w	2	2	2w	2w	2	2	2	2w	Human trafficking in Madagascar
Malawi	Southeast Africa	2	2w	2	2	2	2	2	2	2w	2	2	2	Human trafficking in Malawi
Malaysia	Southeast Asia	2w	2w	2w	3	2w	2w	2	2w	2w	2w	3	2w	Human trafficking in Malaysia
Maldives	Indian Ocean	2w	2w	2w	2	2w	2w	2	2w	2w	2w	2	2	Human trafficking in the Maldives
Mali	Western Africa	2w	2	2w	2w	2w	2w	3	2w	2	2w	2w	2	Human trafficking in Mali
Malta	Mediterranean Sea	2w	2	2	2	2	2	2	2	2	2	2	2	Human trafficking in Malta
Marshall Islands	Pacific Ocean	2	2	2w	2w	3	3	2w	2	2w	2w	2w	2w	
Mauritania	West Africa	3	2w	3	3	3	3	3	3	3	2w	2w	2	Human trafficking in Mauritania
Mauritius	Indian Ocean	1	1	2	2	2w	2	2	2	2	2	2	2w	Human trafficking in Mauritius
Mexico	North America	2	2	2	2	2	2	2	2	2	2	2	2	Human trafficking in Mexico
Micronesia	Oceania	3	2w	2w	2	2	2	2	2	2	2	2	2	
Moldova	Eastern Europe	2	2	2	2	2	2	2w	2	2	2	2	2	Human trafficking in Moldova
Mongolia	East Asia	2	2	2	2	2	2	2	2w	2	2	2	2	Human trafficking in Mongolia
Montenegro	Southeast Europe	2	2	2	2	2	2	2w	2w	2w	2	2	2w	Human trafficking in Montenegro
Morocco	North Africa	2	2	2w	2w	2	2	2	2	2	2	2	2	Human trafficking in Morocco
Mozambique	Southeast Africa	2	2	2	2	2	2w	2w	2	2	2	2	2w	Human trafficking in Mozambique
Namibia	Southern Africa	2	2	2w	2w	2w	2	2	2	2	1	1		Human trafficking in Namibia
Nepal	South Asia	2	2	2	2	2	2	2	2	2	2	2		Human trafficking in Nepal
Netherlands	Western Europe	1	1	1	1	1	1	1	1	1	1	1		Human trafficking in the Netherlands
New Zealand	Oceania	1	1	1	1	1	1	1	1	1	1	2	2	Human trafficking in New Zealand
Nicaragua	Central America	2	1	1	1	2	2	2w	2w	2w	3	3	3	Human trafficking in Nicaragua
Niger	Western Africa	2w	2w	2	2	2	2w	2w	2w	2	2	2		Human trafficking in Niger
Nigeria	Western Africa	1	2	2	2	2	2	2w	2w	2	2w	2		Human trafficking in Nigeria
North Macedonia	Southeast Europe	1	1	1	1	1	2	2	2	2	2	2		Human trafficking in North Macedonia
Norway	Northern Europe	1	1	1	1	1	1	1	1	1	1	2	2	Human trafficking in Norway
Oman	Southwest Asia	2	2	2	2	2	2w	2w	2	2	2	2		Human trafficking in Oman
Pakistan	South Asia	2	2	2	2w	2w	2w	2w	2	2	2w	2w	2w	Human trafficking in Pakistan
Palau	Pacific Ocean	2	2	2	2	2	2	2	2	2	2	2w		Human trafficking in Palau
Panama	Central America	2w	2	2	2w	2	2	2	2	2	2	2		Human trafficking in Panama
Papua New Guinea	Oceania	3	3	3	3	2w	3	2w	3	3	3	2w	3	Human trafficking in Papua New Guinea
Paraguay	South America	2	2	2	2	2	2	2	2	2	2	2	2	Human trafficking in Paraguay
Peru	South America	2	2	2	2	2	2	2	2	2	2	2	2	Human trafficking in Peru
Philippines	Southeast Asia	2	2	2	2	2	1	1	1	1	1	1	1	Human trafficking in the Philippines
Poland	Central Europe	1	1	1	1	1	1	1	1	2	2	2	2	Human trafficking in Poland
Portugal	Western Europe	1	2	2	2	1	1	1	1	1	1	2	2	Human trafficking in Portugal
Qatar	Western Asia	2w	2	2	2w	2w	2w	2	2	2	2	2	2w	Human trafficking in Qatar
Romania	Central Europe	2	2	2	2	2	2	2	2	2w	2w	2w	2w	Human trafficking in Romania
Russia	Northern Eurasia	2w	2w	3	3	3	3	3	3	3	3	3	3	Human trafficking in Russia
Rwanda	Eastern Africa	2	2	2w	2w	2	2w	2w	2	2	2	2	2	Human trafficking in Rwanda
Saint Lucia	Lesser Antilles	2	2	2w	2	2	2w	2	2	2	2	2		
Saint Vincent and the Grenadines	Windward Islands	2	2	2	2w	2w	2w	2	2	2	2	2		Human trafficking in Saint Vincent and the Grenadines
Saudi Arabia	Western Asia	3	3	3	3	2w	2w	2w	2w	3	2w	2	2	Human trafficking in Saudi Arabia
Senegal	Western Africa	2	2w	2	2	2	2w	2w	2w	2	2w	2w	2	Human trafficking in Senegal
Serbia	Central / Southeast Europe	2	2	2	2	2	2w	2w	2	2	2	2	2w	Human trafficking in Serbia
Seychelles	Indian Ocean	2	2w	2w	2	2	2w	2	2w	2	2w	2	1	
Sierra Leone	West Africa	2	2	2	2	2	2	2	2w	2w	2	2	2	Human trafficking in Sierra Leone
Singapore	Southeast Asia	2	2	2	2	2	2	2	2	2	1	1	1	Human trafficking in Singapore
Sint Maarten	Lesser Antilles	-	-	2	2	2	1	1		2	2	2w	3	
Slovakia	Central Europe	1	1	1	1	1	1	1	1	2	2	2	2	Human trafficking in Slovakia
Slovenia	Central Europe; Southeast Europe	1	1	1	1	2	1	1	1	1	1	1	2	Human trafficking in Slovenia
Solomon Islands	Oceania	2w	2	2w	2w	2w	2w	2	2	2	2	2		
South Africa	Southern Africa	2	2	2	2	2	2	2	2w	2w	2	2w	2w	Human trafficking in South Africa
South Sudan	North Africa	-	2w	2w	2w	3	3	3	3	3	3	3	3	
Spain	Western Europe	1	1	1	1	1	1	1	1	1	1	1		Human trafficking in Spain
Sri Lanka	South Asia	2w	2	2w	2w	2w	2w	2	2	2w	2w	2w		Human trafficking in Sri Lanka
Sudan	North Africa	3	3	3	2w	2w	3	3	2w	2w	2w	2	2	Human trafficking in Sudan
Suriname	South America	2	2	2w	2w	2w	3	2w	2w	2	2	2		Human trafficking in Suriname
Sweden	Northern Europe	1	1	1	1	1	1	1	1	1	1	1		Human trafficking in Sweden
Switzerland	Western Europe	2	2	2	1	1	1	1	1	1	1	2	2	Human trafficking in Switzerland
Syria	Western Asia	2w	3	3	3	3	3	3	3	3	3	3	3	Human trafficking in Syria
Taiwan	Asia	1	1	1	1	1	1	1	1	1	1	1	1	Human trafficking in Taiwan
Tajikistan	Central Asia	2	2	2	2	2	2	2	2w	2	2	2	2	Human trafficking in Tajikistan
Tanzania	East Africa	2w	2	2w	2w	2w	2w	2	2	2w	2w	2w	2	Human trafficking in Tanzania
Thailand	Southeast Asia	2w	2w	2w	3	3	2w	2w	2	2	2	2w	2w	Human trafficking in Thailand
Timor-Leste	Southeast Asia	2	2	2	2w	2w	2	2	2	2	2w	2w	2w	Human trafficking in Timor-Leste
Togo	West Africa	2	2	2	2	2	2	2	2w	2	2	2	2	Human trafficking in Togo
Tonga	South Pacific	2	2	2	2	2	2w	2	2	2	2	2w		
Trinidad and Tobago	Caribbean Sea	2	2	2w	2	2w	2w	2	2	2	2	2w		Human trafficking in Trinidad and Tobago
Tunisia	Northern Africa	2w	2	2w	2w	2w	2w	2	2	2	2	2		Human trafficking in Tunisia
Turkey	Western Asia / Eastern Europe	2	2	2	2	2	2	2	2	2	2	2		Human trafficking in Turkey
Turkmenistan	Central Asia	3	2w	2w	2w	2w	3	3	3	3	3	3	3	Human trafficking in Turkmenistan
Uganda	East Africa	2	2	2	2	2	2	2	2	2	2w	2w	2	Human trafficking in Uganda
Ukraine	Eastern Europe	2	2	2w	2w	2w	2w	2	2	2	2	2	2w	Human trafficking in Ukraine
United Arab Emirates	Southwest Asia; Eastern Europe	2	2	2	2	2	2	2	2	2	2	2	2w	Human trafficking in the United Arab Emirates
United Kingdom	Western Europe	1	1	1	1	1	1	1	1	1	1	1		Human trafficking in the United Kingdom
United States	North America	1	1	1	1	1	1	1	1	1	1	1		Human trafficking in the United States
Uruguay	South America	2	2	2w	2w	2	2	2	2	2	2	2		Human trafficking in Uruguay
Uzbekistan	Central Asia	2w	2w	3	3	2w	3	3	2w	2w	2w	2	2	Human trafficking in Uzbekistan
Vanuatu	South Pacific	-	-	-	-	-	-	-	-	-	2	2		
Venezuela	South America	3	2w	2w	3	3	3	3	3	3	3	3	3	Human trafficking in Venezuela
Vietnam	Southeast Asia	2w	2	2	2	2	2	2	2	2w	2w	2w		Human trafficking in Vietnam
Yemen	Western Asia	3	3	3	3	3								Human trafficking in Yemen
Zambia	Southern Africa	2	2	2	2	2	2	2w	2	2	2w	2w	2	Human trafficking in Zambia
Zimbabwe	Southern Africa	2w	3	3	3	3	3	2w	2w	2	2	2w	2	Human trafficking in Zimbabwe

== Criticism ==
Some critics of the Trafficking in Persons Report focus on how its methodology could be improved. For example, one academic paper suggests how the rankings could better incorporate risk factors of trafficking in order to focus more on prevention. Another critic argues that the Report should better incorporate "international rules that states (including the USA) have collectively developed and freely accepted," rather than focusing on criteria drawn up solely by U.S. politicians.

Other critics more fundamentally question its methodology and sources, such as anthropologist Laura Agustín, who writes that the Report "relies on CIA, police and embassy guesstimates of situations that are not understood the same way across all cultures and social classes."

== Hero Acting to End Modern Slavery Award ==
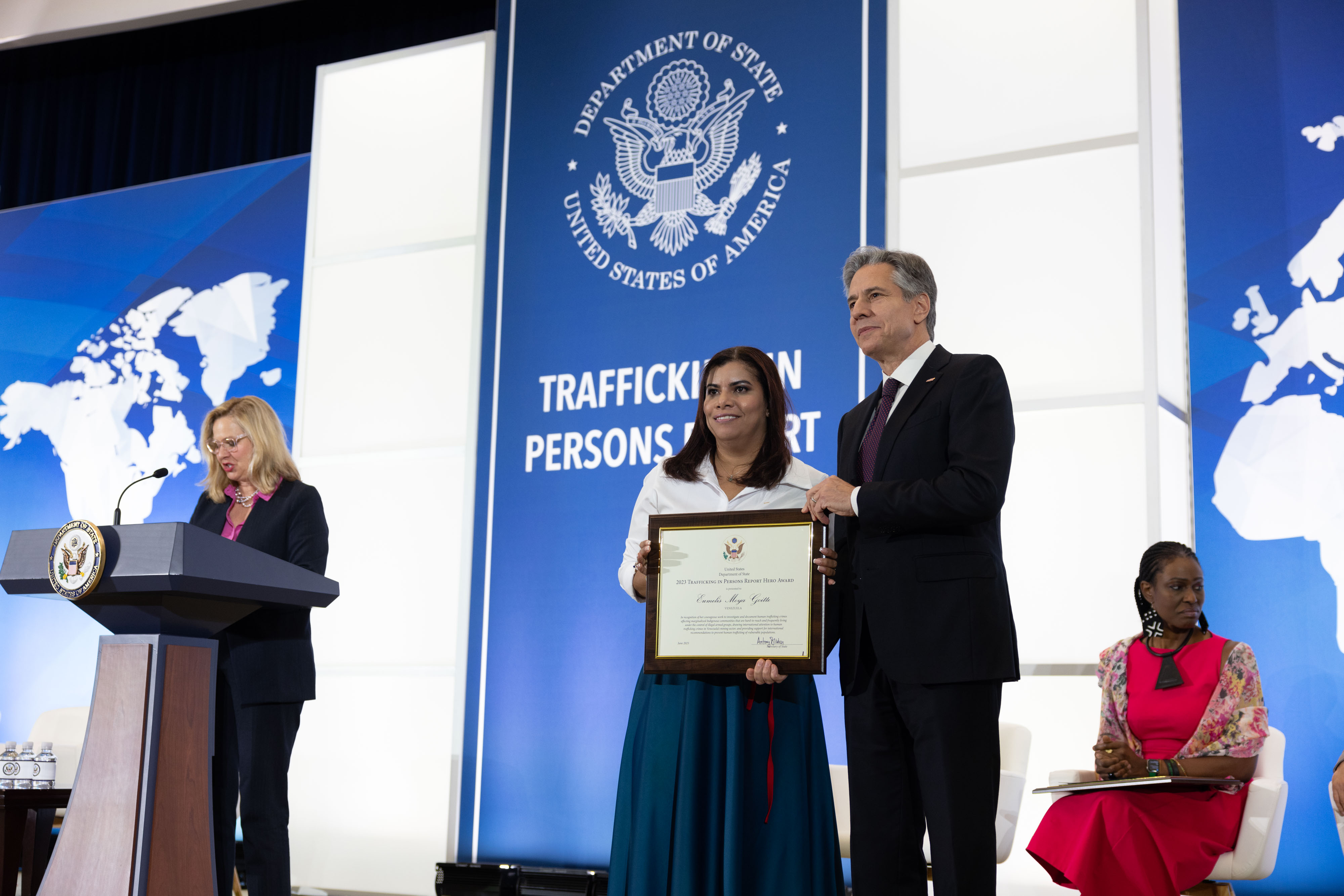
Secretary Blinken congratulates 2023 TIP Report Heroes.

As part of the report the Department of State announces the awarding of the Hero Acting to End Modern Slavery Awards to a number of individuals. The first such awards were made in 2004. Awards are made for actions taken to protect victims, bring offenders to justice or to raise awareness of modern slavery. More than 110 individuals from more than 60 countries have been honored so far. Award winners are invited to a large reception in the United States followed by a tour of several American cities.
