= Human trafficking in Spain =

Spain ratified the 2000 UN TIP Protocol in March 2002.

In 2008, the Government of Spain fully complied with the minimum standards for the elimination of trafficking. Spain undertook sustained measures to assist trafficking victims, prosecute traffickers, provide anti-trafficking law enforcement statistics, prevent trafficking, and reduce the demand for commercial sex.

The U.S. State Department's Office to Monitor and Combat Trafficking in Persons placed the country in "Tier 1" in 2017 and 2023.

From 2017 to 2021, the government identified 1687 victims of human trafficking (an average of more than one a day); 5% of them were children.

In 2023, the Organised Crime Index gave the country a score of 7 out of 10 for human trafficking, noting that most activity was by Romanian, Chinese and Nigerian groups working in Andalusia.

== Prosecution (2008) ==
Spain prohibits all forms of trafficking in persons through Article 318 of its Criminal and Penal Code. The prescribed penalties for sex trafficking is 5 to 15 years' imprisonment, and the penalty for labor trafficking is 4 to 12 years in prison. These are sufficiently stringent, and the penalties prescribed for sex trafficking are commensurate with the prescribed penalties for rape. The government implemented new legislation in 2007 that increased prescribed penalties for trafficking by two to six years in prison if the offender is found to be part of a criminal organization, and passed additional legislation in 2007 that allows Spanish courts to prosecute cases of trafficking that have occurred outside Spain's borders.

During 2008, police arrested 530 individuals for sex trafficking and 161 for labor trafficking. Government officials prosecuted 102 trafficking cases, convicted 142 trafficking offenders, and imposed an average prison sentence of 4.6 years on those convicted. Over 67% of these sentences were greater than four years, and approximately 25% of the convictions resulted in a fine and/ or suspended sentence. Spain announced in early 2008 that it would allot $8.6 million to fund an anti-trafficking cooperation agreement with several Central American countries.

== Protection (2008) ==
The government sustained impressive efforts to provide care for trafficking victims during 2008. In 2007, Spain increased funding to anti-trafficking NGOs providing care to victims. Spain does not have a formal mechanism for referring victims to service providers; however, Spanish police continued informally to refer rescued victims to NGOs providing temporary shelter and rehabilitation services. Victims receive medical assistance, including emergency care, through the national health care system. The police identified 1,035 sex trafficking victims and 445 labor trafficking victims in 2007. The government encourages foreign victims to assist in trafficking investigations and prosecutions by providing work and residence permits to victims choosing to assist, giving them the option of either permanent residence status or funding to return to their own countries after the prosecution. There is no indication that victims are inappropriately incarcerated, fined, or penalized for unlawful acts committed as a direct result of being trafficked. Spain does not employ formal procedures for identifying victims among vulnerable groups, such as women in prostitution.

== Prevention (2008) ==
Spain sustained efforts to raise awareness about trafficking over the past year. The Spanish government instituted a toll-free hotline that offers trafficking victims and false potential victims information. Regional offices of the national police conduct quarterly reviews to set goals for combating trafficking and to assess progress. Spain has not yet, however, enacted its National Integral Plan Against Trafficking in Persons which was expected to be finalized in 2007. The plan includes a government pledge of almost $45 million per year and the dedication of over 200 new police and civil guards to its enforcement. Local governments continued demand-reduction campaigns. The city of Madrid targeted potential sex solicitors with the slogan, "Do not contribute to the perpetuation of 21st Century Slavery." Spanish military troops deploying abroad as international peacekeepers received anti-trafficking training through participation in multilateral training efforts. Under the motto "There Are No Excuses", the Spanish government warned travelers against child sex tourism. In January 2008, the Ministries of Labor and Social Affairs and Foreign Affairs teamed up with Save the Children to host an international conference on child trafficking, which addressed child sex tourism.
