= Human trafficking in Suriname =

Suriname ratified the 2000 UN TIP Protocol in May 2007.

In 2008 Suriname was principally a destination and transit country for men, women, and children trafficked transnationally for the purposes of commercial sexual exploitation and forced labor. It was also a source country for underage Surinamese girls, and increasingly boys, trafficked internally for sexual exploitation. Some of these children were trafficked into the sex trade surrounding gold mining camps in the country’s interior. Foreign girls and women from Guyana, Brazil, the Dominican Republic, and Colombia were trafficked into Suriname for commercial sexual exploitation; some transit Suriname en route to Europe. Chinese men are subjected to possible debt bondage in Suriname, and are subject to forced labor in supermarkets and the construction sector. Chinese women reportedly were exploited sexually in massage parlors and brothels. Haitian migrants, typically en route to French Guiana, sometimes were forced to work in Surinamese agriculture. The Government of Suriname did not fully comply with the minimum standards for the elimination of trafficking; however, it made significant efforts to do so. The government sustained a moderate level of law enforcement action against trafficking crimes, and modestly improved victim assistance and prevention efforts. However, official complicity with suspected trafficking activity is an area for concern.

The U.S. State Department's Office to Monitor and Combat Trafficking in Persons placed the country in "Tier 2 Watchlist" in 2017. The country was at Tier 2 in 2023.

== Prosecution (2008) ==
The Surinamese government sustained moderate anti-trafficking law enforcement efforts over the last year. Suriname prohibits all forms of human trafficking through its criminal code, prescribing punishment from five to 20 years’ imprisonment. These punishments are sufficiently stringent and commensurate with those prescribed for other grave crimes, such as rape. An interagency anti-trafficking in persons working group leads government efforts to investigate and prosecute traffickers. During the reporting period, the government convicted a defendant charged with trafficking Brazilian women into prostitution, and sentenced him to 2.5 years in prison. A trial against four brothel owners charged with trafficking women from the Dominican Republic for sexual exploitation continued. In February 2008, police arrested two brothel owners for trafficking Brazilian women into the country; these cases are pending. An anti-trafficking police unit randomly checked brothels for children as well as adults in forced or coerced conditions. Police cooperated with authorities in Guyana and the Dominican Republic on transnational trafficking cases, and sought improved cooperation with Colombia, the Netherlands Antilles, and French Guiana. There were reports that some Surinamese immigration and customs officials facilitated trafficking into the country by accepting bribes. No prosecutions of such trafficking complicity have been initiated, although investigations of these allegations continue.

== Protection (2008) ==
The government made modest improvements to protect victims of trafficking during the year. Police and prosecutors relied chiefly on civil society partners, particularly a recently established NGO, the Trafficking-in-Persons Foundation, to shelter and assist victims. The government assisted these NGOs with finding safe houses to shelter victims, and worked closely with consular representatives from other countries on repatriation efforts. The government also extended services provided to domestic violence victims to trafficking victims, and widely distributed among key personnel an operations manual on how to identify and treat trafficking victims. Surinamese authorities encourage victims to assist in the investigation and prosecution of their traffickers. There were reports that some foreign victims were incarcerated and deported for immigration violations. Suriname does not provide legal alternatives to the removal of foreign victims to countries where they face hardship or retribution. The government’s anti-trafficking in persons working group is finalizing draft legislation to provide trafficking victims with temporary residency status. Suriname continued discussions with governments in neighboring Guyana, French Guiana, and Brazil on modalities for repatriating trafficking victims.

== Prevention (2008) ==
The government improved prevention efforts during the reporting period. Senior officials continued to condemn and draw public attention to the problem of human trafficking in Suriname. The government’s anti-trafficking in persons working group worked with the International Organization for Migration to implement awareness-raising campaigns across the country, reaching approximately 40,000 people. Outreach activities also were directed to the nation’s border area with Guyana, where many trafficking victims enter the country. Military police, who man ports of entry in this area, were trained on identifying potential trafficking victims. The anti-trafficking in persons working group also issued widespread media warnings about potential trafficking activity after suspicious advertisements were placed in local newspapers recruiting young people to work abroad. However, no discernible government campaigns to reduce demand for commercial sex acts took place during the reporting period. Suriname has not ratified the 2000 UN TIP Protocol.
