= Human trafficking in Uruguay =

Uruguay ratified the 2000 UN TIP Protocol in March 2005.

In 2008 Uruguay was a source and transit country for men, women, and children trafficked for purposes of commercial sexual exploitation and forced labor. Most victims were women, girls, and some boys trafficked within the country to border and tourist areas for sexual exploitation. A government agency found that families had facilitated the exploitation of many children in prostitution. Impoverished parents reportedly turned over their children for domestic and agricultural servitude in rural areas. Some Uruguayan women were trafficked to Spain and Italy for sexual exploitation. U.S. State Department's Office to Monitor and Combat Trafficking in Persons placed the country in "Tier 2" in 2025.

Alongside Human Trafficking, Uruguay experiences challenges with cocaine trafficking. Other forms of crime such as arms trafficking and smuggling are becoming stronger as well.

In 2023, the Organised Crime Index noted that country does not have a National Action Plan for human trafficking.

== Prosecution (2008) ==
The Government of Uruguay increased anti-trafficking law enforcement efforts in 2007. In December 2007, Uruguay enacted an anti-trafficking statute as part of a comprehensive immigration reform package. Article 78 of this new law prohibits all forms of trafficking in persons, and prescribes penalties of four to 16 years' imprisonment. Uruguayan law also criminalizes trafficking of minors and child pornography, prescribing penalties ranging from six months' to 12 years' imprisonment - penalties which are commensurate with those for other grave crimes. Forced labor is prohibited under Section 1 of Title XI of the Uruguayan penal code, and punishable by six to 12 years' imprisonment. During 2007, the government secured three criminal convictions for child pornography. The government inspects legal brothels and other locations for the presence of minors. No victim rescues had been reported as of 2008. The government cooperates with foreign authorities on international trafficking cases. There is no evidence of official complicity with human trafficking.

In 2023, Uruguay reported 208 victims. 169 of those victims were minors and Cuban migrants. there were 35 convictions in 2023 which double those in 2022 being 13.

== Protection (2008) ==
Due to limited resources, the Uruguayan government's efforts to protect trafficking victims have been limited. While the government has provided some assistance to NGOs working in the area of trafficking, the availability of victim services is uneven across the country, especially outside the capital. The government does not have a formal system for identifying trafficking victims among vulnerable populations, such as women in prostitution or undocumented migrants. The government encourages but does not force victims to assist in the investigation and prosecution of their traffickers. Victims' rights are generally respected, and as of 2008 there were no reports of victims being jailed, deported, or otherwise penalized. Uruguayan law provides legal alternatives to the removal of foreign victims to countries where they face hardship or retribution. In 2007, the government assisted IOM with the repatriation of three Uruguayans trafficked abroad.

In late 2024 there were efforts made in helping victims of trafficking. Inmujeres created and signed a contract to help give care to victims beginning in early 2025. This contract provided $2.81 million pesos to an NGO.

== Prevention (2008) ==
In 2007, the government modestly increased its efforts to raise public awareness about the dangers of human trafficking, and collaborated with IOM to combat trafficking in tourist and border areas. The Ministry of Education produces anti-trafficking commercials for national television, and has a program of including anti-trafficking segments in its sex education curriculum. The government also has sponsored anti-trafficking workshops with participants from the region. Uruguayan troops deployed on international peacekeeping missions have received anti-trafficking training at UN-certified training centers. In 2025, there were no reported government efforts to reduce consumer demand for commercial sex acts.
