= Human trafficking in Honduras =

In 2008, Honduras was principally a source and transit country for women, girls, and boys trafficked for the purpose of commercial sexual exploitation. Honduran children were typically trafficked from rural areas to urban and tourist centers such as San Pedro Sula, the North Caribbean coast, and the Bay Islands. Honduran women and children are trafficked to Guatemala, El Salvador, Mexico, and the United States for sexual exploitation. Most foreign victims of commercial sexual exploitation in Honduras were from neighboring countries; some were economic migrants en route to the United States who are victimized by traffickers. Internal child labor and forced child labor for violent criminal gangs were serious concerns.

In 2008 the Government of Honduras did not fully comply with the minimum standards for the elimination of trafficking; however, it made significant efforts to do so. During the year Honduras made strong efforts to increase law enforcement efforts against trafficking offenders and to increase collaboration with non-governmental organization (NGOs), but government services for trafficking victims, particularly adults, remained inadequate.

The U.S. State Department's Office to Monitor and Combat Trafficking in Persons placed the country in "Tier 2" in 2017 and 2023.

Honduras ratified the 2000 UN TIP Protocol in April 2008.

== Prosecution (2008) ==
The Honduran government took significant steps to investigate and punish human trafficking crimes during the reporting year. Honduras prohibits trafficking for the purpose of commercial sexual exploitation through Article 149 of its penal code and an anti-trafficking statute enacted in February 2006, but does not prohibit trafficking for the purpose of labor exploitation. Honduran laws against sex trafficking prescribe penalties of up to 13 years’ imprisonment, which are sufficiently stringent and commensurate with those prescribed for other grave crimes such as rape. Last year, the government significantly increased efforts to investigate trafficking crimes by opening 74 investigations, initiating 13 prosecutions, and obtaining eight convictions, with sentences ranging from 5 to 27 years’ imprisonment. This compares with 24 trafficking-related investigations, 17 prosecutions, eight convictions, and four significant prison terms obtained in 2006. The government also dedicated more prosecutors and police personnel to combat human trafficking activity. Of particular note was a joint effort by the police, NGO Casa Alianza, and the Tegucigalpa mayor’s office to utilize proactive strategies such as raids and stakeouts to catch human traffickers and remove victims from trafficking situations. However, anti-trafficking law enforcement efforts outside the capital and San Pedro Sula were few. The government expanded anti-trafficking training for law enforcement officials in 2007, training thousands of personnel with the assistance of IOM. Law enforcement authorities regularly work with neighboring countries and the United States on anti-trafficking efforts, as well as investigations of child sex tourism. However, defendants over the age of 60 are subject to house arrest in Honduras while awaiting trial; many of these accused offenders, including American citizens, flee or bribe their way out of the country and avoid prosecution. Some acts of complicity with human trafficking have been reported among lower-level immigration officials and in other sectors. However, no investigations or prosecutions of such corrupt activity have been opened by the government.

== Protection (2008) ==
The Honduran government made limited progress in its efforts to assist trafficking victims during the reporting year. The government operated no dedicated shelters or services for trafficking victims, although it referred child trafficking victims to NGOs, which could only serve a small percentage of those in need. Honduran NGOs shouldered a heavy burden to provide victim care, and received no direct funding from the government. While the government increased training on referring trafficking victims for care, NGOs report that referrals in practice are unorganized and uneven. Moreover, few resources, public or private, are available for adult trafficking victims. During the reporting period, the government worked closely with IOM to repatriate more than a dozen young Hondurans who had been trafficked to neighboring countries for sexual exploitation, and Honduran consular officials are trained to identify trafficking victims. Victims are encouraged to assist in the investigation and prosecution of their traffickers, and the government collaborated with NGOs to identify victim witnesses. There were no reports of victims being penalized for unlawful acts committed as a result of their being trafficked. Honduras does not provide legal alternatives to the removal of foreign victims to countries where they may face hardship or retribution. There is no formal system for proactively identifying trafficking victims among vulnerable populations such as sex workers or criminal detainees. In collaboration with an NGO, law enforcement officials in Tegucigalpa undertook a number of victim rescue efforts; fifteen minors were rescued in Tegucigalpa in seven separate cases in 2007.

== Prevention (2008) ==
The government made solid progress in prevention activities during the reporting period. The government’s inter-institutional committee against human trafficking hosted more than 50 training sessions for government officials, civil society members, students, and journalists, reaching more than 3,000 people. The government worked closely with NGOs and international organizations on additional TV and radio awareness-raising campaigns. In February 2008, the National Chamber of Tourism of Honduras and UNICEF launched a Code of Conduct campaign to encourage its tourism industry to prevent child sex tourism. No other government efforts to reduce demand for commercial sex acts were reported, although public awareness of the dangers of human trafficking appeared to be growing.

== See also ==
- Honduran Genocide
