= Human trafficking in Palau =

In 2010, Palau was a transit and destination country for an undetermined, but relatively small, number of women from countries in the Asia-Pacific region who are subjected to trafficking in persons, specifically forced prostitution and, to a lesser extent, men from the Philippines, China, and Bangladesh who were in conditions of forced labor. Some employers recruited foreign men and women to work in Palau through fraudulent representation of contract terms and conditions of employment. These foreign workers willingly migrated to Palau for jobs in domestic service, agriculture, or construction but were subsequently coerced to work in situations significantly different from what their contracts stipulated – excessive hours without pay, threats of physical or financial harm, confiscation of their travel documents, and the withholding of salary payments were used as tools of coercion to obtain and maintain their compelled service. Some women migrated to Palau expecting to work as waitresses or clerks, but were subsequently forced into prostitution in karaoke bars and massage parlors. Non-citizens were officially excluded from the minimum wage law making them vulnerable to involuntary servitude and debt bondage.

In 2010 the Government of Palau did not fully comply with the minimum standards for the elimination of trafficking; however, it made significant efforts to do so. Available information suggests that the extent of Palau’s trafficking problem continues to be modest. Although the government began useful actions to address trafficking during the previous reporting period, in 2009 it did not make similar efforts to prosecute trafficking offenders, identify victims, ensure victims’ access to appropriate victim services, or educate the public on the dangers of human trafficking.

The U.S. State Department's Office to Monitor and Combat Trafficking in Persons placed the country in "Tier 2" in 2017 and 2023.

The country ratified the 2000 UN TIP Protocol in May 2019.

In 2021, the Organised Crime noted that the government was making improvements in tackling this crime, but still lacked funding for the care of victims.

== Prosecution (2010) ==
The Government of Palau made minimal progress in its anti-human trafficking law enforcement efforts during the reporting period. Palau’s Anti-Smuggling and Trafficking Act of 2005 prohibits all forms of trafficking in persons, and prescribes sufficiently stringent penalties for these offenses, ranging from 10 to 50 years’ imprisonment and fines up to $500,000; these are commensurate with penalties prescribed for other serious crimes, such as rape. The convictions of four traffickers successfully prosecuted in 2007 were overturned in 2008 and 2009 because the court felt the foreign defendants had been offered insufficient translation services during the trials, and the cases have not yet been re-filed by the government or re-prosecuted, available options under governing Palau laws. These convicted traffickers had forced 15 Filipinas and 9 Chinese waitresses into prostitution, subjecting them to food deprivation, confinement, and illegal salary deductions. Since winning his appeal, one of the traffickers has re-opened the karaoke bar where he had previously exploited trafficking victims.

Allegations of labor recruiters, facilitators, and employers importing foreign trafficking victims to Palau were not investigated, and no labor trafficking offenders were prosecuted or punished. The government did not train law enforcement officers to proactively identify victims or to identify trafficking victims among vulnerable populations, such as foreign women in prostitution.

== Protection (2010) ==
The Government of Palau offered minimal protective services to victims of trafficking over the reporting period. No long-term protective services were available to victims, and Palauan government agencies did not employ formal procedures to identify and refer trafficking victims to available services. The government did not identify or assist any victims of trafficking during the year, though it has done so in the past. A faith-based organization provided limited assistance to victims of any crime. In the past their services were accessible to trafficking victims and would be made available again, as needed. Palauan authorities did not penalize potential trafficking victims for illegal acts committed as a direct result of being trafficked and has previously encouraged victims to assist in the investigation and prosecution of trafficking offenders. The government did not remove victims to countries where they may face hardship or retribution. In the past, the government did not provide victims with financial assistance, but allowed them to remain in Palau and seek legal employment if they did not wish to return home.

== Prevention (2010) ==
The government made no discernible efforts to prevent human trafficking through planned campaigns to educate the public about its dangers. The government did not take steps to establish a national anti-trafficking policy, action plan or multi-agency coordination mechanism. Agencies, however, have informally cooperated with each other, with foreign governments, and with international organizations on trafficking matters in the past and continued to do so. In August 2009, the government charged the Chief of the Division of Labor in the Ministry of Commerce and Trade and the Director of the Department of Immigration with alien smuggling, falsification of travel documents, bribery, and misconduct in public office. Although authorities have not yet shown that the cases clearly involved the transnational movement of trafficking victims, the officials were assisting irregular migrants in avoiding standard immigration procedures; these migrants were from populations which had been identified as trafficking victims in Palau in the past. The government made no discernible efforts to address the demand for commercial sex acts or the demand for forced labor during the reporting period.
