= Human trafficking in Zambia =

In 2008 Zambia was a source, transit, and destination country for women and children trafficked for the purposes of forced labor and sexual exploitation. Child prostitution existed in Zambia's urban centers, often encouraged or facilitated by relatives or acquaintances of the victim. Many Zambian child laborers, particularly those in the agriculture, domestic service, and fishing sectors, were also victims of human trafficking. Zambian women, lured by false employment or marriage offers, were trafficked to South Africa via Zimbabwe for sexual exploitation, and to Europe via Malawi. Zambia was a transit point for regional trafficking of women and children, particularly from Angola to Namibia for agricultural labor and from the Democratic Republic of the Congo to South Africa. Malawian and Mozambican adults and children were occasionally trafficked to Zambia for forced agricultural labor.

The country ratified the 2000 UN TIP Protocol in April 2005.

The U.S. State Department's Office to Monitor and Combat Trafficking in Persons placed the country in "Tier 2 Watchlist" in 2017 and 2023.

In 2023, the Organised Crime Index gave the country a score of 5 out of 10 for human trafficking, noting that the government had expanded its work to prevent this crime.

== Prosecution (2008) ==
The Government of Zambia's anti-trafficking law enforcement efforts have not achieved concrete results; prosecutions of trafficking crimes have not occurred, as police and immigration officials remained stymied by the lack of a functional human trafficking statute. Unlike the previous year, there were no new prosecutions or convictions of alleged traffickers in 2007. Zambia prohibits human trafficking through a 2005 amendment to its penal code, which prescribes penalties of 20 years' to life imprisonment - penalties that are commensurate with those prescribed for other grave crimes. The statute does not, however, define trafficking or set out the elements of the offense, and has been interpreted thus far as applying narrowly to only the explicit sale of a person. In 2007, the government's interagency committee on trafficking finalized a draft comprehensive anti-trafficking law and national policy before transferring the documents to the Zambian Law Development Commission for review. During the reporting period, police and immigration authorities investigated at least 38 suspected cases of trafficking, the majority of which were detected at border crossings and, thus, were difficult to distinguish from smuggling. Relevant diplomatic missions, particularly the Congolese Embassy, assisted with the investigations. When violations of child labor laws were discovered, labor inspectors resolved these cases through mediation and counseling with the employers and families, rather than pursuing criminal charges against the exploiters. In the absence of a usable law against human trafficking, the majority of the suspected victims and traffickers were summarily deported to their country of origin. None of the cases investigated during 2007 resulted in prosecutions. The trial of two men accused of selling an eight-year-old boy in June 2006 continued as of early 2008; the defendants remained in prison pending the outcome. The government seconded two officers, one from the National Police Service and one from the Department of Immigration, to IOM for four months in 2007 to receive training as Master Trainers. These officers then provided anti-trafficking training to 400 police, immigration officials, prosecutors, and judges.

== Protection (2008) ==
The government's efforts to protect victims of trafficking are extremely limited. While there are no formal victim identification or referral procedures in Zambia, government officials informally referred victims of trafficking to IOM, which provided shelter and case management. During 2007, police and immigration authorities referred four trafficking victims - two Congolese and two Zambian - to IOM for assistance. In 2007, the government allocated $184,000 to the Ministry of Labor and Social Security's Child Labor Unit, a 23 percent increase over its 2006 budget. During 2007, the Ministry's Labor Inspections Unit undertook targeted inspections of child labor in Eastern, Central, and Lusaka Provinces. Some child victims of forced labor were referred to NGOs for assistance or enrolled in school feeding programs. The government encourages victims' assistance in the investigation and prosecution of traffickers. Identified victims were not detained or jailed for unlawful acts committed as a direct result of being trafficked.

== Prevention (2008) ==
While Zambia lacks a comprehensive public awareness campaign on human trafficking, the government sustained efforts to prevent vulnerable children from being trafficked during 2007. It continued operation of two youth camps that provided counseling, rehabilitation, and enrolment in schools or vocational training to street children vulnerable to trafficking, including girls removed from prostitution; 210 children graduated from the camps in 2007. Immigration and law enforcement officials at border posts distributed IOM-produced literature on trafficking to local communities and the government-owned radio station broadcast anti-trafficking messages. The government worked with NGOs on an ongoing basis to publicize the dangers of prostitution through radio announcements and the distribution of pamphlets and posters. With the support of ILO/ IPEC, the Child Labor Unit formed seven District Child Labor Committees, composed of traditional chiefs, parents, health workers, and religious leaders to increase awareness of child labor laws and the worst forms of child labor. These committees provided information on exploitative child labor to 8,600 persons during the year. Standardized training in police and military academies includes a module that addresses reducing the demand for commercial sex acts as well as the dangers of commercial sexual exploitation.
