= Sex trafficking in Europe =

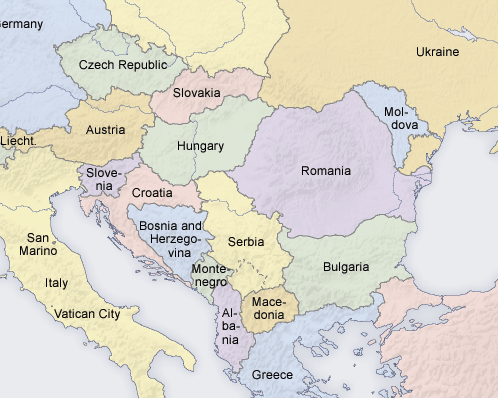
Southeast Europe after 1992

Sex trafficking is defined as the transportation of persons by means of coercion, deception and/or forced into exploitative and slavery-like conditions and is commonly associated with organized crime.

Germany has become a "center for the sexual exploitation of young women from Eastern Europe, as well as a sphere of activity for organized crime groups from around the world".

The selling of young women into sexual slavery has become one of the fastest-growing criminal enterprises in the European Union. While human trafficking has existed for centuries all over the world, it has become an increasing concern for countries in Southeast Europe since the fall of Communism. In 1997 alone as many as 175,000 young women from the former Soviet Union and Eastern and Central Europe were sold as commodities in the sex markets of the developed countries in Europe and the Americas. Economic hardship and promises of prosperity have left many individuals vulnerable to trafficking within their countries and to destinations in other parts of Europe and the world. The United Nations reports that 4 million people a year are traded against their will to work in one or another form of servitude.

The measures against the trafficking of women focus on harsher criminal legislation and punishments and improving international police cooperation. There are vast media campaigns that are designed to be informative to the public, as well as policymakers and potential victims. In various countries where legislative measures against trafficking are still in their infancy, these media campaigns are important in preventing trafficking.

== History of trafficking ==
Since antiquity, conquered people were forced into slavery and were taken to the victor nation. These people were given new lives of servitude, as servants or sex slaves. Prior to 4000 BC, there is no evidence of sexual servitude and slavery in human culture. Greece and Rome were notorious for capturing people and making slaves out of them. In the height of the Roman Empire, one in every three persons was thought to have been a slave. Men were used as laborers, while women and girls were used for enjoyment purposes in brothels as well as in private homes.

From the Middle Ages onward, both male and female saqaliba slaves were trafficked from Northern or Eastern Europe to the Islamic Middle East and the al-Andalus; while male saqaliba could be given work in a number of tasks such as offices in the kitchen, falconry, mint, textile workshops, the administration or the royal guard (in the case of harem guards, they were castrated), female saqaliba were placed in the harems. From the other side of the Muslim world, the East, when African slave trade to the Middle East was in full swing, women slaves garnered a higher price than men both because of their reproductive value, but also because they were sex objects as well as servants.

From the exposure of the White slave trade affair in the 1880s, the sex trafficking of women was noted and fought in both Europe and North America. In Europe at the time, governments had been part of sex slavery schemes for over a century. International treaties were adopted in 1904, 1910, and 1925 outlawing the trading of women.

In the 1990s, the problem of sex trade and sex tourism was increasing and caught international attention when nonprofit groups started making noise about the problem. A company called Big Apple Oriental Tours, out of New York, specialized in sex tours for men who wished to go to the Philippines, the Dominican Republic, Thailand, India and Sri Lanka, among other destinations, to engage in sex with prostitutes and later would share their experiences with other customers. In Japan, corporations began offering all expenses paid sex tourism excursions to Taiwan as a perk to their executive personnel. After the Soviet Union fell, the demand for sex slaves boomed. It was fueled by economic austerity. This was the first time since the white slave trade of the 19th century that huge numbers of Caucasian women were bought and sold for the purpose of sex. Israel took advantage of the demand for European women that brothels were big money makers. The New York Times and Dateline NBC both did stories on Israel's sex trafficking business.

In response to all the press that sex trafficking was receiving, the United States and the Netherlands jointly funded a media campaign to warn women about scams of employment offers and other debt bondage schemes that were being employed by traffickers to lure these women into what is essentially slavery. In 2000, the Convention against Transnational Organized Crime, also known as the Palermo Protocols, was adopted. About 80 nations signed and ratified the new treaty. Since the Palermo Protocols, prostitution scandals involving United Nations peacekeeping troops and defense contractors have been plentiful. In one case, in Liberia, U.N. administrators were implicated in a scam where food aid was used to force girls and women into servicing peacekeeping troops and local businessmen. Another issue arose in 2002, when a DynCorp employee testified to Congress that fellow workers stationed in Bosnia had bought girls to keep in their homes as sex slaves. Today, sex trafficking is still prevalent and booming.

== Causes ==
The majority of trafficking victims in Europe are young adult women and the most common reason for human trafficking is sexual exploitation. However, trafficking for forced labor makes up one third of all trafficking occurrences; victims go to the agriculture, construction, fishery, manufacturing, and textile industries. There are also women and men being trafficked for the purposes of domestic servitude. Children in this region are trafficked for the purposes of sexual exploitation, forced marriage and forced begging.

=== Fall of the Soviet Union ===
The fall of the Soviet Union has been identified as one of the main contributing factors in explaining the recent increase in human trafficking. It provided both human capital and new regional opportunities to fuel the expansion. After this period, trafficking victims, primarily women, expanded to include more diverse forms, aided by the rise of organized crime, corruption, and the decline of borders. Porous borders and close proximity to Western Europe have made it easier and cheaper to transport victims within the region and abroad.

=== Poverty ===
Women and girls are particularly vulnerable to trafficking in poverty status. Because people in poverty have few means of supporting themselves, they often have to go to extremes to keep their families afloat. Children are also vulnerable to trafficking when their families' socio-economic situation is dire. Girls are more likely to be sold into bondage because in many societies, parents often choose to invest in their sons because sons are seen as more valuable. Girls are not educated and are sent away to work. Human trafficking helps perpetuate the forced labor participation and global poverty. Lower income countries are often the sources for the girls and higher incomes countries is where they are bought. There are many origin countries and many destination countries for sex trafficking. The largest number comes from Russia and Ukraine. The main destinations outside Europe for these victims include the Middle East, Japan, Thailand, and North America.

=== Militarization ===
Another factor contributing to the rise in trafficking of women has been the breakup of Yugoslavia. The presence of a large number of foreign men in the region after the Yugoslav Wars led to the trafficking of thousands of women and girls for commercial sex exploitation. The connection between military bases and sex work is a well-known phenomenon and soldiers have helped drive the demand for brothels in the region.

== Recruitment ==
Trafficking of economically and socially vulnerable young women is one of the fastest growing criminal enterprises in the current global economy.

Impoverished, solo women seeking legitimate employment can be targets of sex trafficking. Agents may promise women employment upon relocation to a city, and upon arrival, take their papers and documentation, forcing them into sexual servitude. Women who have entered a country illegally, or overstayed their visas, may also be targeted. Sex traffickers disguised as counterfeiters who can forge documents can trap people into debt-bondage. The victims are told they are indebted to their traffickers for their travel and living expenses, and the victims will not be released until this debt has been repaid.

Organised crime groups in Southeast Europe and the former Soviet Union have retained lucrative operations by modifying their routes and methods to suit the rapidly changing global market. Previous work experience and high education levels have enabled traffickers to "produce fraudulent documents, utilize advanced communications technology, and operate successfully across borders." Their personal connections and ability to utilize advanced technology has been a challenge for many governments and law enforcement agencies seeking to investigate and prosecute traffickers. Also unique is the advanced education of many of the trafficked victims. Although well qualified for employment in their home countries, victims often seek better opportunities or pay abroad. Many ploys have been used to recruit more educated victims including marriage and employment agencies, fake modeling agencies, film production studios, and work and study abroad opportunities. Because legitimate opportunities exist in these areas, it is often difficult to separate the fraudulent advertisements from the credible opportunities. These printed advertisements are rarely vetted.

=== Child trafficking ===
Child trafficking in Europe is mostly likely to occur in children younger than twelve (for begging, theft, and other street crimes) and older than 15 (for commercial sexual exploitation). Cultural taboos generally prevent the trafficking of young boys for sexual exploitation, however, some cases have been noted among Romanian children trafficked abroad. Susceptible to trafficking are children with disabilities and children belonging to specific ethnic minorities, such as the Jevgjit in Albania and the Romani people in other parts of the region. A UNICEF report conducted in 2006 by Dr. Gilly McKenzie, (UN Trafficking expert), noted that children meeting these criteria were not generally the victims of outside traffickers, but members of their own community, who sought to generate an income from their sale abroad. This report also highlighted five common characteristics of children at risk for trafficking. These included:

- children who suffer domestic violence
- children who lack family support and protection (e.g. children living in institutions)
- children who have dropped out of school
- children belonging to ethnic minorities (e.g. Roma)
- children who have been previously trafficked

=== Consequences ===
Dr. Gilly McKenzie, a leading expert in the U.N. on Trafficking and Organized Crime, stated in 2010 study: "Once a girl is forced into the life of sexual bondage, she has little means of getting out. Fear is the most effective motivator the traffickers use. The girls are imprisoned and kept under guard. They are given little food and water. Often they are raped by their captors, and then given over to clients. Physical abuse, beatings, and verbal abuse are used to keep the girls in line and under control. To prevent escape attempts, the traffickers take all forms of documentation. They also threaten the girls with threats of violence and murder of their families back home. Because many girls are transported into new countries, they do not speak the language nor do they have any network to assist them. Because they are illegal aliens, they fear law enforcement and public services."

There are many costs thrust upon the victims of sex trafficking. Health risks are the most easily observed and can be the most expensive. Young sex workers, both female and male, are at high risk of HIV infection and other sexually transmitted diseases. They have little or no negotiating power to insist on condom use for prevention. They receive the diseases from clients and pass them along to new clients. There have been reports of sex workers having respiratory problems included allergies, sinus infections, colds, pneumonia, and tuberculosis. Drug use is very common among sex workers, which has its own batch of health problems including over-doses, strokes, and death. Other health conditions identified were dental problems, lip burns caused by hot crack pipes, facial rashes and sores, herpes, frostbite, swollen legs, bleeding ulcers, and abscesses on legs. There is also the beating these women endure, which result in fractured bones, burns, cuts, concussions, bruises, dislocations, and possible death. Forced abortions with unsterilized instruments can also have health problems.

Psychological problems are also identified when talking to victims of trafficking. Addiction to drugs or alcohol was very prevalent, though some rescued victims do not wish to enter a rehabilitation program. Depression, thoughts of suicide, and grief can be attributed to almost all trafficked victims. The human and economic costs calculated by the World Bank reach over $20 billion. This included underpayment of wages and recruiting fees. Though, the cost of human capital is nearly impossible to calculate.

== Prevalence ==
The actual number of those who are being trafficked is nearly impossible to calculate. One reason is the covert nature of the dealings; it is illegal, so gaining hard evidence is not an easy feat. Internationally there are about 2.45 million people trafficked between 1995 and 2004, according to the ILO.

Some of the data collection problems identified in this region are:

- the percentage of crimes committed versus those identified, investigated, and prosecuted is not well understood
- cooperation is needed by a wide variety of actors and reported statistics need to be standardized across organizations and agencies
- a lack of trust between NGOs and the government may prohibit the open sharing of information, especially if NGOs feel that sharing information about their clients will put either the victim or the organization at risk
- there may be linguistic, cultural, and inter-personal barriers that lead victims to underreport occurrences
- some incidents of trafficking are investigated as smuggling, prostitution, etc., which keeps them from being captured in databases
- incidents investigated as trafficking may continue to remain classified as such, even if they are reclassified as a lesser charge

To address these issues, efforts are under way to make consistent global data available. According to the International Labor Organization, several initiatives have been suggested and are currently underway by the ILO, IOM, and the EU. Also The International Centre for Migration Policy Development, in cooperation with national governments and NGOs, has begun the process of forming a standardized approach to data collection and reporting.

Although the numbers vary, there are commonalities that begin to show a picture. Women make up the majority of trafficked victims, who are mostly forced into sexual exploitation. Children are also being trafficked in high numbers. Though because some countries only have legislation criminalizing trafficking for sexual exploitation or trafficking in women, trafficking in men and boys might have been largely under-reported because it is not properly recorded.

Although all forms of trafficking exist in Europe, sex trafficking has received the most attention and exploitation of women in this area has been widely publicized in the media. Between 2003 and 2004, 85% of the victims that were assisted were victims of sexual exploitation.

The distinctiveness of post-Soviet and Eastern European trafficking is the speed with which it grew and globalized. There was no long-existing trade in human beings or established networks to facilitate this business. Instead, the conditions of the transitional societies created the ideal conditions conducive to trade in human beings. Now, years after initial transition, all forms of human trafficking are endemic in the region, a result of poverty, ineffective counter-measures, the frequent collusion of government officials in this trade, and the rise of criminal entrepreneurship.

Although anti-trafficking campaigns over the past few years have led to improvements in some forms of trafficking, data collection and management has continued to be a problem for countries in Eastern Europe. Data collection is an important tool for monitoring country and regional trends and its analysis is often used to shape anti-trafficking policies. Data on both the victims and their traffickers is important, and information on investigation and prosecution rates are often utilized when assessing a country's performance.

=== Trafficking typologies ===
The following table details trafficking typologies unique to the countries of Central and Eastern Europe. These three typologies, developed by the United Nations Office on Drugs and Crime and Professor Louise Shelley are useful in developing law enforcement strategies to combat trafficking. Because Europe encompasses many countries with diverse political histories, three typologies apply to this region. Similarities exist between these three categories and when compared with typologies of other regions and countries, it is evident that trafficking in Eastern Europe is more likely to involve women, violence, and be connected with other forms of organized crime.

Europe in general	Post-Soviet	Southeast Europe
Single leader; Clear hierarchy; Internal discipline; Named group; Social/ethnic identity; Violence integral; Influence/control over a particular territory	Participate primarily in the trafficking of women; Use victims like a natural and expendable resource; Sell to nearby trading partners; High violence and human rights abuses; Often "break" women before they leave the country of origin	Almost all trafficking in women; Middlemen for Russian organized crime; Increasingly integrated as take over sex businesses in destination countries; Involvement of top level law enforcement in home countries; Use profits to finance other illegal activities, and invest in property and business elsewhere; Considerable violence

== Profits ==
Human trafficking is the second most profitable illegal activity in the world, after drug trafficking. There is ample supply and demand for the goods, which are young women. There is little risk because in countries with laws criminalizing trafficking, criminals often escape prosecution and convictions. Economic revenues are the largest motivator behind human trafficking. The ILO's Global Report, A Global Alliance Against Forced Labor (2005), estimated the global annual profits generated by human trafficking to be around $31.6 billion. This figure represents an average of about $13,000 per year or $1,100 per month per trafficking victim. Half of this profit is made in industrialized countries.

== Advocates ==
There are many people who want to see an end to trafficking. Some of the most prominent are:

- Governments: Each country has taken efforts to combat human trafficking. Some have ratified the Palermo Protocols. Others have developed strategies to deal with domestic trafficking and others have increased the law to prosecute traffickers. Integrating law enforcement, immigration offices and judiciary branches into making the victims feel safe and possibly giving temporary visas or repatriate the victims to their own country.
- Health and public services: Once victims are rescued from traffickers, victims need access to basic services, such as shelter, legal assistance, transportation, medical exams, and psychological counseling.
- NGOs and CSOs: NGOs and CSOs have a long history in trying to combat traffickers, even before the international community became aware of the intensity of the problem. Their main focus is getting attention for their anti-trafficking causes, increasing research and information, helping law enforcement with victim identification and other basic needs of the victims.
- Media: The media plays an indispensable role in educating the public about the reality of human trafficking and illuminating the problems through films, photographs, newspapers, magazine articles and other mediums. The media is used as one of the most effective ways to inform communities around the world about different aspects of human trafficking.

=== The role of NGOs ===
While there are a multitude of factors that limit the ability of NGOs to respond to trafficking, such as lack of funding, extensive mandates, and lack of government support, NGOs play a critical supporting role for victims. Most NGOs, which emerged during the 1990s, initially struggled to hold their ground against increasingly predatory traffickers. While their success varies from country to country, NGOs are often credited with stepping in and taking initiative where governments have failed. Victims are often more likely to trust NGOs because "many trafficked persons fear and distrust state-based organizations as they frequently enter destination countries illegally, or have had their documentation removed on arrival." Fear of deportation, being forced to testify, or retaliation by their traffickers also contribute to their reluctance to approach statutory agencies for support. NGOs have risen to fill this gap and provide services to victims. Services they offer include:

- legal, social, and psychological counseling and reintegration support
- education and awareness about the risks of trafficking
- informational and statistical support and research
- lobbying for victims' rights

== Anti-trafficking media campaigns ==
Since the late 1990s, media campaigns have been warning about the dangers of human trafficking across most of Europe. The anti-trafficking campaigns aim at raising awareness about trafficking in women by addressing both the general population and then those who are most likely to be targeted, policy makers, law enforcement officers and relevant public officials. The formats used varied greatly, including indoor and outdoor posters, leaflets, flyers, postcards, stickers, shopping bags and pocket-calendars. There were also advertisements on buses, billboards radio, and television. The International Organization for Migration (IOM) is one of the main European organizations that are interested in developing counter-trafficking programs, consulting governments on anti- trafficking policies and conducting research on trafficking for the sex industry. The IOM is one of the groups heading up this media campaign to end trafficking. It is collaborating with European governments, the European Commission (EC), the Organization for the Security and Cooperation in Europe and the United Nations.

== Country snapshot ==
Countries	Source/Transit/Destination Country	Tier
Albania	source, transit, destination	2
Bosnia-Herzegovina	source, transit, destination	2 WL
Bulgaria	source, transit, destination	2
Croatia	source, transit, destination	2
Kosovo	source, destination	2
North Macedonia	source, transit, destination	2
Moldova	source	2
Montenegro	source, transit, destination	2 WL
Romania	source, transit, destination	2
Serbia	source, transit, destination	2

TIERS

TIER 1 Countries whose governments fully comply with the Trafficking Victims Protection Act's (TVPA) minimum standards

TIER 2 Countries whose governments do not fully comply with the TVPA's minimum standards, but are making significant efforts to bring themselves into compliance with those standards

TIER 2 WATCH LIST Countries whose governments do not fully comply with the TVPA's minimum standards, but are making significant efforts to bring themselves into compliance with those standards, AND: a) the absolute number of victims of severe forms of trafficking is very significant or is significantly increasing; b) there is a failure to provide evidence of increasing efforts to combat severe forms of trafficking in persons from the previous year; or, c) the determination that a country is making significant efforts to bring themselves into compliance with minimum standards was based on commitments by the country to take additional future steps over the next year

TIER 3 Countries whose governments do not fully comply with the minimum standards and are not making significant efforts to do so

== Human trafficking by country ==
- Human trafficking in Albania
- Human trafficking in Bosnia and Herzegovina
- Human trafficking in Bulgaria
- Human trafficking in Croatia
- Human trafficking in Kosovo
- Human trafficking in Macedonia
- Human trafficking in Moldova
- Human trafficking in Montenegro
- Human trafficking in Romania
- Human trafficking in Serbia
