= Human trafficking in Finland =

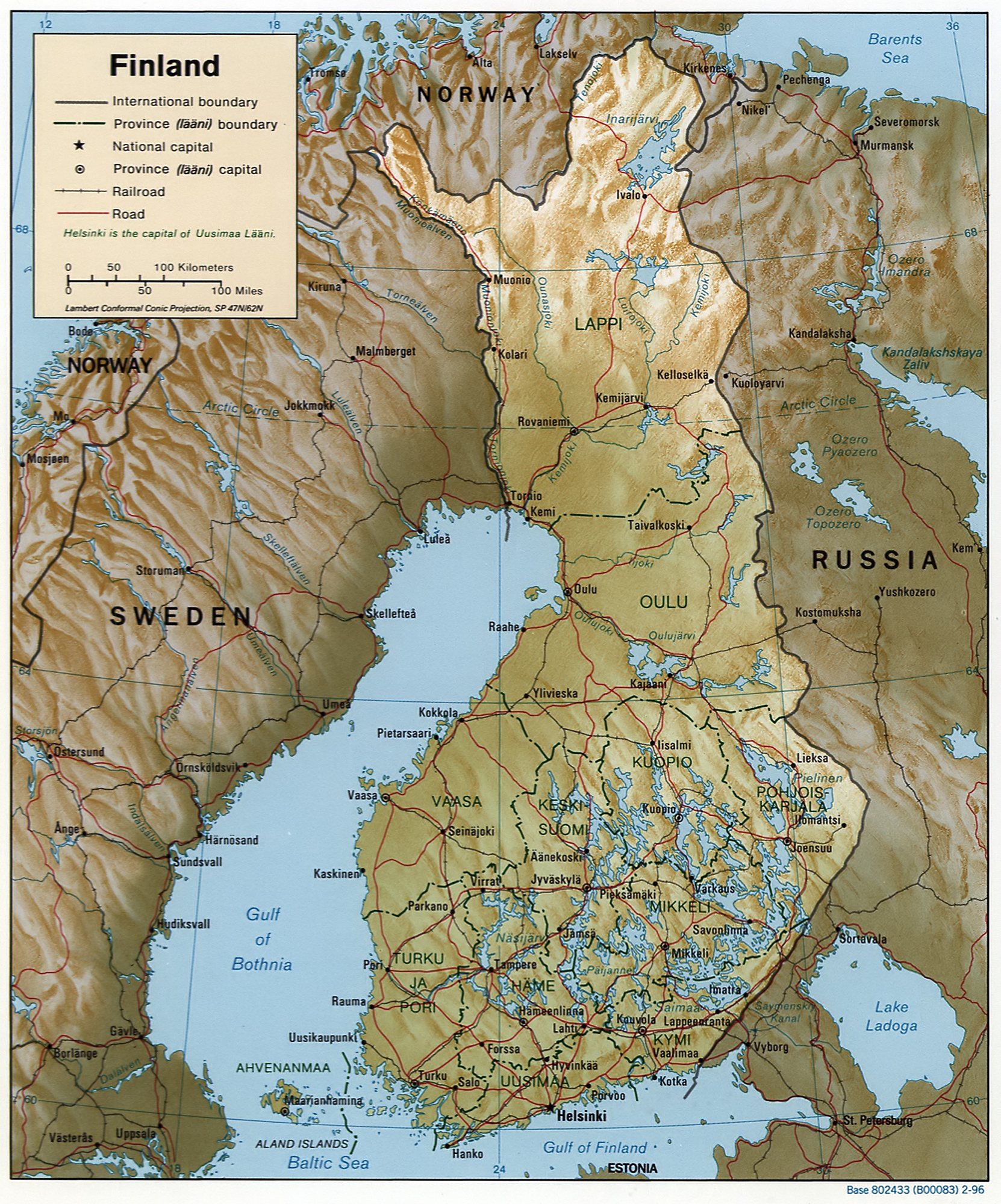
A map of Finland

Finland is a transit, destination, and a limited source country for women, men and girls subjected to forced marriage, forced labor and sex trafficking. Finnish legislation condemns trafficking as a crime and has met the standards of the EU Protocol even before the convention came into effect. NGOs and the government cooperate in providing help for the victims of trafficking in Finland. Although the Finnish Police investigated and referred more people to care in 2013, prosecution and conviction numbers of suspected offenders remain low relative to the number of potential victims. The government is currently working on improving the anti-trafficking laws and practices to improve the situation.

Finland ratified the 2000 UN TIP Protocol in September 2006.

The U.S. State Department's Office to Monitor and Combat Trafficking in Persons placed the country in "Tier 1" in 2017 and 2023.

In 2023, the Organised Crime Index gave Finland 3.5 out of 10 for human trafficking. It noted an increase in numbers of victims and the prevalence of gangs from Europe and Vietnam in this crime.

The 2024 GRETA report noted that the annual number of identified trafficking victims had gone up from 229 to 367 in three years, with a low number of prosecutions.

== Human trafficking ==
Human trafficking is the trade of humans that can occur internationally or within a nation, often with a goal of forced marriage, sexual slavery, forced labor, commercial sexual exploitation or the removal of organs. Newest forms of human trafficking include ova and surrogacy trade. Persons that are victims of human trafficking are usually recruited or taken by the means of the threat or use of force, or by fraud, kidnapping, deception, abuse of power or a vulnerable position with the aim of exploitation. Some of the biggest reasons for human trafficking are poverty, the global level of gender inequality and the feminization of poverty as well as different kinds of conflicts, cataclysms, religious and ethnic persecutions, violence and discrimination (of especially women).

== Prevalence ==
Identifying a person as a victim of trafficking is one of the most difficult tasks when measuring human trafficking. According to Eurostat's 'Trafficking in human beings': "In accordance with Directive 2011/36/EU, the term "identified victim" refers to persons who have been formally identified by the relevant authorities as a victim of trafficking in human beings. The term "presumed victim" on the other hand is used for trafficking victims who have met the criteria of the EU Directive but have not been formally identified by the relevant formal authorities as a trafficking victim or who have declined to be formally or legally identified as a trafficking victim."

A total of 30,146 identified and presumed victims were registered in the 28 EU Member States in 2010–2012, out of which over a thousand were children trafficked for sexual exploitation. 80 percent of registered victims were female, and 65 percent of registered victims were EU citizens. Of the registered victims who are confirmed as EU citizens, the top 5 countries of citizenship are Bulgaria, Romania, the Netherlands, Hungary and Poland. Over the three years, the top 5 non-EU countries of citizenship of registered victims were Nigeria, Brazil, China, Viet Nam and Russia. There has been an increase in the number of ¨unknown¨ citizenships from 2010 to 2011. In addition, 71 percent of labor exploitation victims were male in the EU Member States during these three years.

Finland is both a transit and a destination country for human trafficking, but human trafficking is less prevalent in Finland than it is in most other EU countries. To some extent Finland is also considered a source country for human trafficking. No incidents of organ trade have been detected in Finland, and trafficking tends to mostly appear in forms of prostitution and procuring (pimping), as well as labor exploitation. Labor exploitation is especially prevalent in berry picking, restaurant, cleaning, metal, transportation, construction and gardening industries as well as in personal households. According to statistics provided by Eurostat, in 2010–2012 there was a total of 231 registered victims of human trafficking in Finland. The Finnish Police estimate that about 200-250 women cross the Finnish border from the East weekly to work as prostitutes in Finland. Annually about 10,000–15,000 prostitutes spend some amount of time working in Finland. These women are mostly from Russia, Estonia and to some extent from Lithuania and Latvia. A chance of these women being forced to work as prostitutes cannot be excluded. In comparison, the corresponding number of registered victims of human trafficking in Sweden was 311, 179 in Denmark, 125 in Norway, 135 in Estonia and 4,474 in United Kingdom.

Finland is also known to be a transit country for trafficking in children. The children that pass through Finland come mostly from East Asia and they are headed elsewhere in Europe. In Finland, children of immigrants still in the process of seeking asylum are considered to be at risk for being trafficked: a number of children have disappeared from the centers where immigrants stay during the asylum process, so trafficking of children with the aim of exploiting them sexually might also take place in Finland.

Fewer than a hundred people seek help from the aid shelters annually in Finland.

For the first half of 2019, in a six-month period from January to June Finland's Assistance System for Victims of Human Trafficking (Migri) reported 115 human trafficking cases, of which most common were forced marriage and being made to work without workers rights in agriculture or restaurants. Seven reported having been sexually harassed. The victims were mainly from Afghanistan (17), Nigeria (16), Iraq (15), Somalia (15), Cameroon (7) and Romania (5).

== Reporting and conviction rates ==
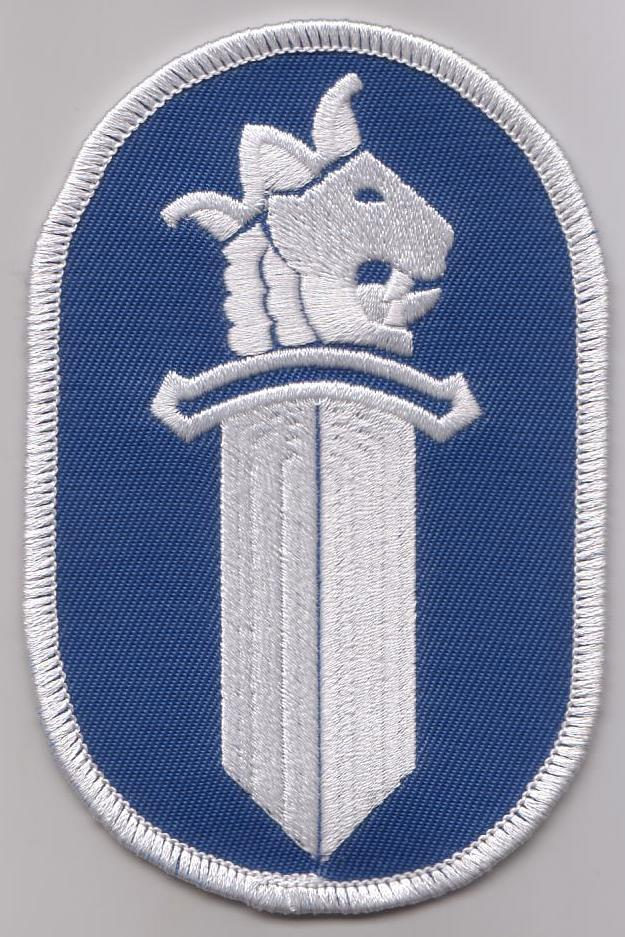
The sword insignia of Finnish police

A total of 8,551 prosecutions were reported by EU Member States over the years 2010-2012 for human trafficking. Of those cases, in 3,786 the prosecuted was convicted for human trafficking. More than 70 percent of suspected traffickers were male in the EU Member States. Traffickers are often adult males who operate in the country where they are from, but more women and foreigners are involved in human trafficking than in most other crimes. Although most of those prosecuted and/or convicted for trafficking in persons are men, trafficking has a quite high rate of females involved in it. Very few other crimes record a level of female participation in committing the crime such as that of human trafficking. Venla Roth, Senior Adviser in Office of the Ombudsman for Minorities and the National Rapporteur on Trafficking in Human Beings, has stated that the conviction rates are so low because in many cases in which the trafficker controlled the victim, the trafficker can say they were not aware of the fact that the victim was dependent on them. Taking advantage of a person's dependence is one of the details defining trafficking in the Finnish Penal Code.

Since 2006, sentences have ranged from 1.5 to 5.5 years imprisonment: there were no reports of suspended sentences. The government did not prosecute any persons for suspected child sex tourism offenses in 2009.

There were 23 trafficking investigations in Finland in 2012, while the number of people prosecuted for trafficking in 2012 was eight. Eight trafficking offenders were prosecuted in 2012.

In 2013, there were 12 sex trafficking investigations and 15 labor trafficking investigations in Finland, and 19 persons were prosecuted for trafficking. Two labor trafficking offenders were convicted in 2013 with sentences of 30 months’ imprisonment, which was a smaller number of convictions than the year before. In four additional cases, five other people were persecuted for trafficking but not found guilty. However, they were convicted on lesser charges. Additionally, the prior convictions of three human trafficking offenders were upheld by two appellate courts. No offenders were convicted for sex trafficking in 2013. The government also encourages victims of human trafficking to assist in the investigation and prosecution of trafficking offenders. In 2013, 12 victims assisted law enforcement in pre-trial investigations, 10 of whom participated in the prosecutions of alleged traffickers.

Illegal immigration is also criminalized in Finland. It is an offence often associated with human trafficking because the persons being trafficked are considered clients of the smugglers or traffickers. The number of persons using fake or illegal travelling documents in border controls was over 200 in the year 2000. Only a few of these cases have resulted in prosecution.

== Law ==
Finland has ratified the Conventions of 1926 which deals with slavery, and the Convention of 1949 which deals with trafficking in human beings and counteracting the exploitation of other people's prostitution, with their subsequent amendments. The national legislation on human trafficking and prostitution is mostly based on these conventions and their requirements. The whole 25th chapter of Finnish Penal Code deals with crimes on freedoms of persons. However, the only part in Finnish Penal Code that directly addresses human trafficking is § 25:3 and § 25:3a (9.7.2004/650). According to these two sections, both human trafficking and aggravated human trafficking, as well as the attempt of either, are punishable crimes in Finland. The laws on human trafficking came to effect in the Penal Code 1. August 2004. Prior to this, cases of human trafficking were punishable bylaws that dealt with procuring and discrimination at work. If convicted for human trafficking, the offender is prescribed a minimum of four months and a maximum of six years in prison. The penalty scale for aggravated trafficking in human beings is 2 to 10 years in prison. Penalties commensurate with penalties prescribed for other serious crimes, such as rape. Although the government does not have a specialized anti-trafficking law enforcement unit, it integrated formal anti-trafficking awareness into police and border guard training curricula for new recruits and in-service personnel. The government has also provided anti-trafficking training to its prosecutors for the past four years. The government also distributed leaflets to thousands of visitors at a major annual travel fair warning that child sex tourism is a crime. Finland's laws provide extraterritorial jurisdiction over child sex tourism offenses perpetrated overseas by Finnish nationals.

=== Definitions of human trafficking in the Penal Code ===
The definition of human trafficking is strict in the Penal Code. To fulfill the criteria for human trafficking it is crucial that the victim has been deceived or that the victim's dependent or insecure position has been taken advantage of when subjecting the person to work as, for example, a prostitute. Trafficking in persons is a crime against the individual.

The sections below are translated from the Finnish Penal Code.

==== Human trafficking 3 § (9.7.2004/650) ====
A person who

- takes advantage of the victim's dependent or insecure position or the victim is pressured
- deceives the victim or takes advantage of the victim's deception
- is paid compensation to a person who is keeping a victim under his/her control
- receives a compensation for oppressing a victim, recruiting a victim or for handing over, transporting, receiving or housing a victim with the aim of sexually exploiting him/her in a way described in the first clause of 9 § in the 20th chapter of Finnish Penal Code. Alternatively, a person who aims to take sexual advantage of the victim in a way that is comparable to the first clause of 9 § in the 20th chapter of Finnish Penal Code, or if he/she receives compensation for oppressing or recruiting a victim or for handing over, transporting, receiving or housing a victim with an aim of labor exploitation, or subjecting the victim to circumstances that violate human dignity or removal of organs or tissue, should be convicted.
  - Chapter 20, 9 § (24.7.1998/563), first clause: a person who has organized a room or another space to be used for sexual intercourse or an act comparable to that, or if the space is to be used for a sexual act or an act comparable and that clearly violates sexual modesty and is committed by a child under the age of 18 should be convicted for human trafficking and sentenced to a minimum of four months and a maximum of six years of prison time.

(19.12.2014/1177)

A person who oppresses a person younger than 18 years old or recruits, hands over, transports, receives or houses the underage person with an aim mentioned in the first clause should be convicted even if none of the means mentioned in the first clause were used.

An attempt is also punishable.

==== Aggravated human trafficking 3 a § (9.7.2004/650) ====
The human trafficking is considered aggravated if

- it uses violence, threatening or treachery in addition or instead of the means mentioned in 3 §
- it intentionally or with gross negligence causes the victim severe bodily harm, a serious illness or another life-threatening condition or considerable suffering comparable to those
- the offense is committed against a child who is under 18 years old or against a person whose ability to defend him/herself is substantially impaired, or
- if the offense is committed as a part of operations by an organized criminal group as mentioned in the fourth clause of 1a§ in the 17th chapter of the Penal Code
  - Chapter 17, 1 a § (21.2.2003/142), fourth clause: a person who acquires, attempts to acquire or hand over business premises or any other spaces, means of transport, or crucial equipment the organized crime group might require

and if the crime is grave as a whole, the offender should be convicted for aggravated human trafficking and sentenced to 2–10 years in prison.

A person who enslaves a victim, transports slaves or sells them, and if the offense if the offense is aggravated when assessed as a whole.

An attempt is also punishable.

== Protection ==
=== Government ===
The Finnish government continued to provide direct shelter, trafficking-specific rehabilitative assistance, and medical care to adult and child victims in addition to its provision of funding for NGO-run shelters. Police and border guard officials used a series of written guidelines on victim referral and treatment developed by the Finnish Immigration Service to proactively identify victims of trafficking; however, one official raised concerns that the threshold for referral to services was too high. During the reporting period, officials referred 13 victims to service providers, raising concerns about the low number of potential victims identified and the effectiveness of victim identification procedures. The government encouraged victims to assist in the investigation and prosecution of trafficking offenders.

Under the Act on Compensation for Crime Damage, victims of crime could receive government compensation for personal injury, damage to property, or other financial loss caused by a crime. Finnish authorities provided identified trafficking victims with a six-month reflection period, a time for victims to receive immediate care and assistance while they consider whether to assist law enforcement. There were no indications, however, that the reflection period was used extensively. Victims of trafficking wishing to stay longer than six months were eligible to apply for an extended residence permit or asylum as an alternative to deportation. The government granted permanent residence permits to seven victims during the reporting period. The government made some effort to ensure victims were not penalized for unlawful acts committed as a direct result of being trafficked. The government provided anti-trafficking awareness training for labor inspectors, diplomatic personnel, public health workers, immigration adjudication staff and Finnair flight attendants.

=== Pro-support Centre ===
The Pro-support Centre was established in 1990. It is a support service centre for prostitutes, subordinated to the private Diacone Institution in Helsinki. The main purpose of this cente is to provide health care and social services. In 2002, this centre was the only organisation in Finland that offered support services for prostitutes, whether Finnish or foreign. Most of the centre's activities were concentrated in the areas in close proximity to the capital.

The centre does not collect or file systematic information about the clients who come and seek help, and its employees work under a secrecy obligation. However, the employees of the support centre have the most long-standing and thorough knowledge of the prostitution situation and its developments in the Helsinki region, and this experience is also available for outside research purposes.

Pro-support Centre holds the role of the third sector in very high regard when it comes to anti-human trafficking. The centre carried out a project together with Finland's Slot Machine Association (RAY) in 2007–2009. The goal of the project was to produce new information on human trafficking and other similar phenomena in Finland, as well as to evaluate the existing support network for the victims of human trafficking and their families. Simultaneously many professionals who work closely with human trafficking and related phenomena, were trained to better recognize and support the victims of human trafficking.

== Prevention ==
Many different kinds of organizations work together in efforts to prevent human trafficking in Finland. Some of these organizations are subordinated to the government and its ministries, some to the military and some are third sector organizations.

The most important bodies working for anti-human trafficking in Finland include the Office of Immigration, Police, National Bureau of Investigation, The Finnish Border Guard, Ministry of Employment and the Economy along with multiple non-governmental organizations such as All Our Children Association, Amnesty International Finland Association, the Refugee Advice Centre and the Pro-support Centre.

=== Government ===
National action plan against trafficking in human beings was submitted to the Government on 24 March 2005, and the Government's response was obtained on 27 September during the same year. The plan covers multiple aspects of the phenomena, including those of providing help to the victims as well as improving the process of convicting suspected human traffickers. The plan also emphasizes raising the level of information available on trafficking as well as the awareness of human trafficking in Finland. Bettering the ability of professionals to recognize the victims of trafficking is also important. The Action Plan explicitly states that the concentrations of the plan are on human rights and on victim-centered approaches, and that the mutual cooperation of all authorities involved in human trafficking is crucial.

The Ministry of Defense provided Finnish troops who were going to leave for international peacekeeping missions with intensive anti-trafficking training aimed at providing the forces with the ability to identify potential trafficking victims; there were no trafficking-related cases involving Finnish troops or government personnel deployed overseas in 2009.

The government's efforts to monitor and scrutinize its anti-trafficking actions reflected a high level of political will to address human trafficking. Recently numerous Finnish political parties such as Vasemmistoliitto (Left Alliance), Vihreä Liitto (The Greens), Suomen Ruotsalainen Kansanpuolue and Suomen Kristillisdemokraatit (Christian Democrats) addressed the issue of human trafficking as well as gender equality in their manifestos for the parliamental election in 2015. The government cooperates with different NGOs and organizations in providing help for the victims of trafficking in Finland. In addition to domestic prevention of human trafficking, Finland does anti-human trafficking work on EU and international levels. For example, the Finnish government supported an anti-trafficking partnership with the Government of Nigeria by providing approximately $1.1 million toward Nigeria's anti-trafficking agency: Human trafficking was criminalized in Nigeria fairly recently, in 2003. A national operator NAPTIP (National Agency for the Prohibition of Trafficking in Persons) was then established to enforce the new anti-trafficking laws. In addition to criminal investigations, NAPTIP is also responsible for prosecution, the protection and rehabilitation of victims as well as for educating and informing the victims and the people.

The government has also organized and hosted multiple seminars and conferences that addressed human trafficking and its prevention. The Ministry of Foreign Affairs organized a meeting concerning human trafficking in 2004 together with the Office for Democratic Institutions and Human Rights (ODIHR), which is the principal institution of the Organization for Security and Cooperation in Europe (OSCE). The following year Finland hosted NATO's anti-human trafficking seminar.

=== The National Research and Development Centre for Welfare and Health ===
The Ministry for Social Affairs and Health started a project in 1998 with goal of prevention of prostitution. This was a part of a five-year programme for "The prevention of violence against women and prostitution". The National Research and Development Centre for Welfare and Health (STAKES) is the main organization executing the project. STAKES is subordinated to the ministry for Social Affairs and Health. The project is based on the 1997 Equality between the Genders Programme of the Finnish Government and therefore also on the action plan of the Beijing IV Women's Equality World Conference. STAKES has also done other research on prostitution, and this project is also utilized to continue that research.

According to research conducted by Lehti and Aromaa, "The purpose of the project is to monitor prostitution at the national and international level, and to compile and produce information about the phenomena of commercial sex. Also, it provides expert support to authorities and also to other agencies, and disseminates information about prostitution and its prevention. The objective is to produce and support general research on prostitution, also to produce action proposals for the prevention of prostitution and the reduction of disadvantages and unacceptable circumstances related to this. Simultaneously, the project attempts to further co-operation between the authorities and civic organisations regarding this phenomenon."

== See also ==
- Human trafficking by country
- Human rights in Finland
- Slavery in Finland
