= Human trafficking in Europe =

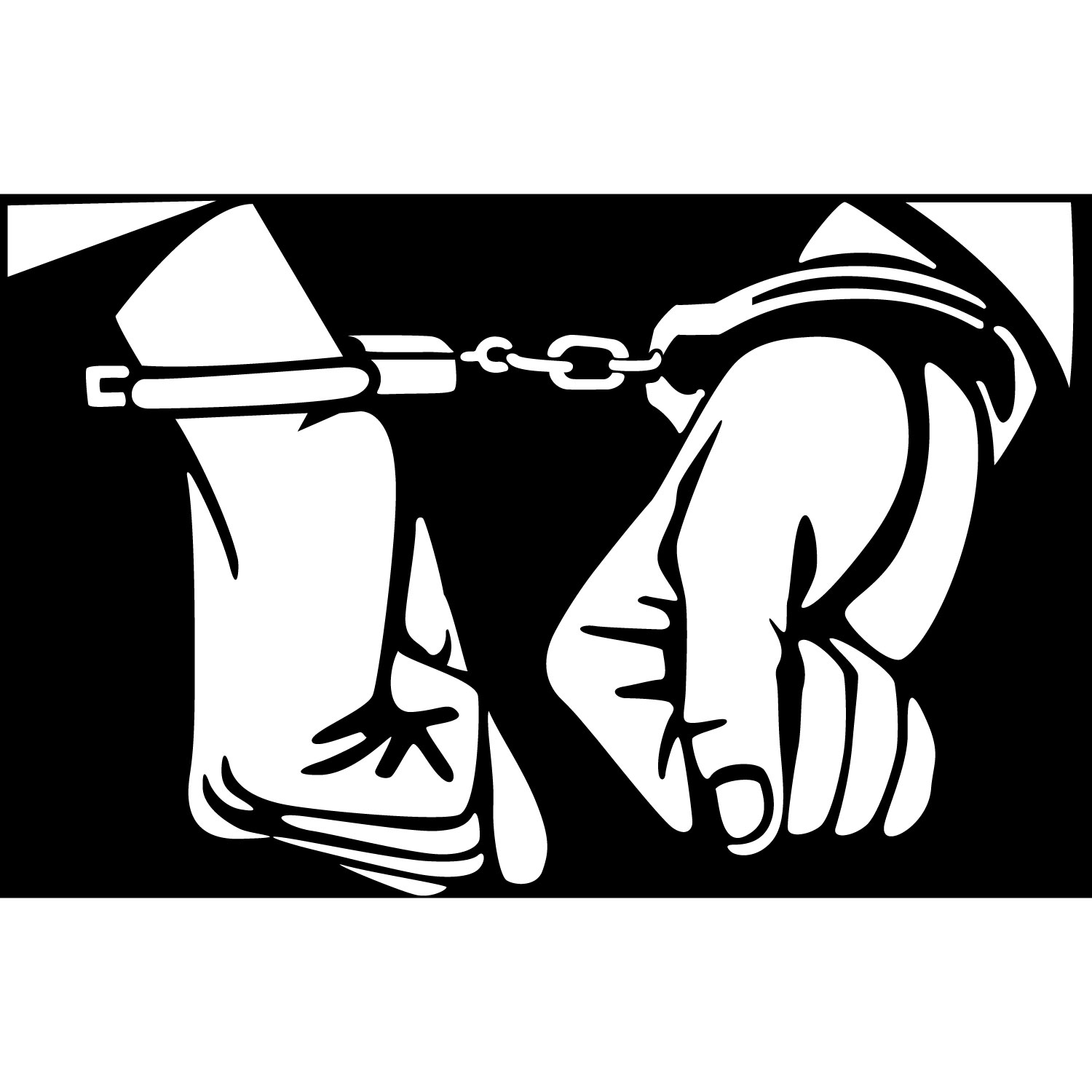
Human trafficking is a punishable crime.

Human trafficking in Europe is a regional phenomenon of the wider practice of trade in humans for the purposes of various forms of coercive exploitation. Human trafficking has existed for centuries all over the world, and follows from the earlier practice of slavery, which differed from human trafficking in that it was legally recognized and accepted. It has become an increasing concern for countries in Europe since the Revolutions of 1989. The transition to a market economy in some countries has led to both opportunity and a loss of security for citizens of these countries. Economic hardship and promises of prosperity have left many people vulnerable to trafficking within their countries and to destinations in other parts of Europe and the world. Countries within the Balkan region face different challenges and are at varying stages of compliance with the rules that govern trafficking in persons.

== Causes ==
The dissolution of the Soviet Union has been identified as one of the main contributing factors in explaining the recent increase in human trafficking in Europe. It provided both human capital and new regional opportunities to fuel the expansion. After this period, trafficking victims, primarily women, expanded to include more diverse forms, aided by the rise of organized crime, corruption, and the decline of borders. Porous borders and close proximity of wealthy countries have made it easier and cheaper to transport victims within the region and abroad. At the beginning of the 21st century Chechens and Ingush kept Russian captives as slaves or in slave-like conditions in the mountains of the northern Caucasus.

Another factor contributing to the rise in trafficking has been militarization and war in the Balkans. The presence of a large number of foreign men in the Balkans after the war in Yugoslavia led to the trafficking of thousands of women for commercial sex exploitation. The connection between military bases and sex work is a well-known phenomenon and soldiers have helped drive the demand for brothels in this region.

Outside Balkan nations, the legalization of soliciting prostitution has also been linked to increased trafficking, with the Netherlands being identified as having a large percentage of trafficking victims transported there.

== Prevalence ==
Although all forms of trafficking exist in Europe, sex trafficking has received the most attention and exploitation of girls and women in this area has been widely publicized in the media. Between 2003-2004, 85% of the victims that were assisted were victims of sexual exploitation. "The distinctiveness of post-Soviet and Eastern European trafficking is the speed with which it grew and globalized. There was no long-existing trade in human beings or established networks to facilitate this business. Instead, the conditions of the transitional societies created the ideal conditions conducive to trade in human beings. Now, years after initial transition, all forms of human trafficking are endemic in the region, a result of poverty, ineffective counter-measures, the frequent collusion of government officials in this trade, and the rise of criminal entrepreneurship."

=== Trafficking typologies ===
The following table details trafficking typologies unique to certain places in Europe. These three typologies, developed by the United Nations Office on Drugs and Crime and Professor Louise Shelley are useful in developing law enforcement strategies to combat trafficking. Since Europe encompasses many countries with diverse political histories, three typologies apply to this region. Similarities exist between these three categories and when compared with typologies of other regions and countries, it is evident that trafficking is more likely to involve women, violence, and be connected with other forms of organized crime.

Europe in general	Post-Soviet	Balkans
Single leader; Clear hierarchy; Internal discipline; Named group; Social/ethnic identity; Violence integral; Influence/control over a particular territory	Participate primarily in the trafficking of women; Use victims like a natural and expendable resource; Sell to nearby trading partners; High violence and human rights abuses; Often "break" women before they leave the country of origin	Almost all trafficking in women; Middlemen for Russian organized crime; Increasingly integrated as take over sex businesses in destination countries; Involvement of top level law enforcement in home countries; Use profits to finance other illegal activities, and invest in property and business elsewhere; Considerable violence

== Recruitment ==
Crime groups in the Balkans and the former Soviet Union have achieved success by being flexible and altering their routes and methods to suit the rapidly changing global market. Previous work experience and high education levels have enabled traffickers to "produce fraudulent documents, utilize advanced communications technology, and operate successfully across borders." Their personal connections and ability to utilize advanced technology has posed a challenge for many governments and law enforcement agencies seeking to investigate and prosecute traffickers. Another unique trait is advanced education of many of the trafficked victims. Although well qualified for employment in their home countries, victims often seek better opportunities or pay abroad. Many ploys have been used to recruit more educated victims including marriage and employment agencies, fake modeling agencies, film production studios, and work and study abroad opportunities. Because legitimate opportunities exist in these areas, it is often difficult to separate the fraudulent advertisements from the credible opportunities. These printed advertisements are rarely vetted.

=== Child trafficking ===
Child trafficking in the Balkans is most likely to occur in children younger than twelve (for begging, theft, and other street crimes) and older than 15 (for commercial sexual exploitation). Cultural taboos generally prevent the trafficking of young boys for sexual exploitation, however, some cases have been noted among Romanian children trafficked abroad. Susceptible to trafficking are children with disabilities and children belonging to specific ethnic minorities, such as the Jevgjit in Albania and the Romani people in other parts of the region. A UNICEF report conducted in 2006, noted that children meeting these criteria were not generally the victims of outside traffickers, but members of their own community, who sought to generate an income from their sale abroad. This report also highlighted five common characteristics of children at risk for trafficking in the Balkans. These included:

- children who suffer domestic violence
- children who lack family support and protection (ex. children living in institutions)
- children who have dropped out of school
- children belonging to ethnic minorities (ex. Roma)
- children who have been previously trafficked

== Challenges ==
Although anti-trafficking campaigns over the past few years have become more effective in countering some forms of trafficking, data collection and management has continued to be a problem for countries in the Balkans (southeastern Europe). Data collection is an important tool for monitoring country and regional trends and its analysis is often used to shape anti-trafficking policies. It is important to collect data on both the victims and their traffickers and information on investigation and prosecution rates are often utilized when assessing a country's performance.

Some of the data collection problems identified in this region are:

- the percentage of crimes committed versus those identified, investigated, and prosecuted is not well understood
- cooperation is needed by a wide variety of actors and reported statistics need to be standardized across organizations and agencies
- a lack of trust between NGOs and the government may prohibit the open sharing of information, especially if NGOs feel that sharing information about their clients will put either the victim or the organization at risk
- there may be linguistic, cultural, and inter-personal barriers that lead victims to underreport occurrences
- some incidences of trafficking are investigated as smuggling, prostitution, etc., which keeps them from being captured in databases
- incidents investigated as trafficking may continue to remain classified as such, even if they are reclassified as a lesser charge

To address these issues, the International Centre for Migration Policy Development, in cooperation with national governments and NGOs, has begun the process of forming a standardized approach to data collection and reporting all over Europe.

== The Role of NGOs ==
See Further Reading: 'Second Annual Report on Victims of Trafficking in South-Eastern Europe' for a list of NGOs working to combat human trafficking

While there are a multitude of factors that limit the ability of NGOs to respond to trafficking, such as lack of funding, extensive mandates, and lack of government support, NGOs play a critical supporting role for victims. Most NGOs, which emerged during the 1990s, initially struggled to hold their ground against increasingly predatory traffickers. While their success varies from country to country, NGOs are often credited with stepping in and taking initiative where governments have failed. Victims are often more likely to trust NGOs because "many trafficked persons fear and distrust state-based organizations as they frequently enter destination countries illegally, or have had their documentation removed on arrival." Fear of deportation, being forced to testify, or retaliation by their traffickers also contribute to their reluctance to approach statutory agencies for support. NGOs have risen to fill this gap and provide services to victims. Services they offer include:

- legal, social, and psychological counseling and reintegration support
- education and awareness about the risks of trafficking
- informational and statistical support and research
- lobbying for victims rights

== Country Snapshot ==
Countries	Source/Transit/Destination Country	Tier
Albania	source	2
Bosnia-Herzegovina	source, transit, destination	2
Bulgaria	source, transit, destination	2
Croatia	source, transit, destination	1
Kosovo	source, transit, destination	2
North Macedonia	source, transit, destination	1
Moldova	source, transit, destination	2 WL
Montenegro	source, transit, destination	2
Romania	source, transit, destination	2
Serbia	source, transit, destination	2

TIERS

TIER 1 Countries whose governments fully comply with the Trafficking Victims Protection Act's (TVPA) minimum standards

TIER 2 Countries whose governments do not fully comply with the TVPA's minimum standards, but are making significant efforts to bring themselves into compliance with those standards

TIER 3 Countries whose governments do not fully comply with the minimum standards and are not making significant efforts to do so

== For Country Specific Information ==
- Human trafficking in Albania
- Human trafficking in Belarus
- Human trafficking in Bosnia and Herzegovina
- Human trafficking in Bulgaria
- Human trafficking in Croatia
- Human trafficking in the Czech Republic
- Human trafficking in France
- Human trafficking in Germany
- Human trafficking in Greece
- Human trafficking in Hungary
- Human trafficking in Italy
- Human trafficking in Kosovo
- Human trafficking in Latvia
- Human trafficking in Lithuania
- Human trafficking in North Macedonia
- Human trafficking in Moldova
- Human trafficking in Montenegro
- Human trafficking in the Netherlands
- Human trafficking in Poland
- Human trafficking in Romania
- Human trafficking in Russia
- Human trafficking in Serbia
- Human trafficking in Slovakia
- Human trafficking in Slovenia
- Human trafficking in the United Kingdom
- Human trafficking in Ukraine

== See also ==
- Sex trafficking in Europe
- That Most Precious Merchandise: The Mediterranean Trade in Black Sea Slaves, 1260-1500
