= European slave trade =

European slave trade may refer to:

- Atlantic slave trade
- Black Sea slave trade
- Indian Ocean slave trade
- Human trafficking in Europe

== See also ==
- Category:Slavery in Europe for a list of slavery by particular country topics
