= Human trafficking in Lithuania =

Lithuania ratified the 2000 UN TIP Protocol in June 2003.

IN 2008 Lithuania was a source, transit, and destination country for women and children trafficked for the purpose of commercial sexual exploitation. In 2008, it was estimated by the U.S. Department of State that approximately 21 percent of Lithuanian trafficking victims were underage girls. Lithuanian women were trafficked within the country and to the United Kingdom, Germany, Spain, Italy, Portugal, Denmark, Norway, and the Netherlands. Women from Belarus, Russia (the Kaliningrad region), and Ukraine were trafficked to and through Lithuania for the purpose of sexual exploitation.

The Government of Lithuania fully complied with the minimum standards for the elimination of trafficking. During the 2008, Lithuania sustained generous anti-trafficking funding by allocating more than $144,000 to Non-governmental organizations (NGOs) to help improve victim assistance and prevention efforts. The government also ensured that all convicted traffickers received prison sentences, a notable improvement from the previous reporting period.

The U.S. State Department's Office to Monitor and Combat Trafficking in Persons placed the country in "Tier 1" in 2017 and 2023.

Between 2018 and 2022, the government formally identified 148 victims; 90% were Lithuanians, 60% were women and 7% were children.

In 2023, the Organised Crime Index gave the country a score of 4 out of 10 for human trafficking.

== Prosecution (2008) ==
The Government of Lithuania demonstrated mixed law enforcement efforts during the reporting period; although the number of investigations, prosecutions, and convictions decreased, the government ensured that all convicted traffickers served some time in prison. Lithuania prohibits all forms of trafficking through Article 147 of its criminal code, which prescribes penalties ranging from probation to 15 years' imprisonment. These penalties are sufficiently stringent and commensurate with penalties prescribed for other grave crimes, such as rape. In 2007, authorities initiated nine trafficking investigations, down from 26 investigations is 2006. Authorities prosecuted eight defendants during the reporting period, a significant decrease from 23 defendants prosecuted in 2006. Lithuanian courts convicted four trafficking offenders in 2007, a significant decrease from 10 convictions in 2006; however, all convicted traffickers received prison sentences—an improvement over 2006, when 20 percent of convicted traffickers served no time in prison. Sentences ranged from five to eight years' imprisonment. Officials also acknowledge that many law enforcement officers lack experience in investigating trafficking cases and managing pre-trial investigations. Although Lithuania has bilateral cooperation agreements on combating trafficking with more than 20 countries, some NGOs claimed that officials lack the capacity to effectively obtain evidence from foreign law enforcement institutions; however, Lithuanian authorities' cooperation with police in the United Kingdom led to the successful convictions of Lithuanian traffickers. In May 2007, each of Lithuania's 10 counties appointed one police officer to coordinate anti-trafficking activities.

== Protection (2008) ==
The Lithuanian government continued to improve efforts to protect and assist victims of trafficking. NGOs identified 56 trafficking victims in 2007, compared with 110 in 2006. In 2007, the government provided approximately $144,000 to 13 anti-trafficking NGOs to conduct victim assistance and rehabilitation, including vocational training and job placement for victims. With funding from the government, IOM developed a method for victim identification and a national victim referral mechanism; it was formally adopted by police in December 2007. The government encouraged victims to assist in trafficking investigations and prosecutions, though many trafficking victims are reluctant to initiate cases. In 2007, the government allocated $100,000 to improve witness protection services, including for victims of trafficking. Victims who participated in court proceedings were eligible for temporary residency permits. Identified victims were not penalized for unlawful acts committed as a direct result of their being trafficked.

== Prevention (2008) ==
Lithuania showed significant progress in its trafficking prevention efforts. In March 2007, the government appointed a high-ranking official at the Ministry of Interior to coordinate government-wide anti-trafficking activities. In 2007, the government held five anti-trafficking coordination meetings with NGOs, although NGOs reported there was uneven cooperation between NGOs and police, especially in rural areas. The government allocated approximately $15,000 to NGOs for anti-trafficking prevention, including a campaign to reduce the demand for commercial sexual exploitation. The campaign included broadcasting of audio and video spots on radio and TV as well as posters at bus and train stations. The posters had the slogans: "It is a shame to buy women" and "Would you buy me?". These posters were displayed in approximately 2000 locations in 13 towns throughout the country. The government spent an additional $30,000 for an anti-trafficking awareness campaign for youth in six cities during 2007.

== See also ==
- Human trafficking in Europe
