= Human trafficking in Belarus =

Belarus is a source, destination, and transit country for men, women and children subjected to human trafficking, specifically for the purposes of forced labor and forced prostitution, the latter of which affects predominantly women and children.

As of 2026, the government of Belarus was assessed as not currently meeting the minimum standards to prevent human trafficking under the TVPA, nor making significant efforts to do so. As a result, Belarus was allocated a Tier 3 classification in the 2026 Office to Monitor and Combat Trafficking in Persons Report. Belarus also received a Tier 3 classification in the years following its initial Tier 3 classification in 2015, with the notable exception of 2021, where it was put on the Tier 2 watchlist.

== Background ==
The majority of identified Belarusian victims were females forced into prostitution abroad, including in: Russia, Germany, Latvia, other European countries, Turkey, Kazakhstan, Lebanon, and the UAE. There were reports that women from low-income families in Belarus’ regions were subjected to forced prostitution in Minsk. Belarusian men, women, and children continued to be subjected to forced begging, as well as forced labor in the construction industry and other sectors in Russia. According to the Ministry of Interior, Belarusian single, unemployed females between the ages of 16 and 30 were most at risk of being trafficked. Human traffickers often used informal social networks to approach potential victims.

In 2009, the Government of Belarus did not fully comply with the minimum standards for the elimination of trafficking; however, it is making significant efforts to do so. The government’s response to trafficking is difficult to gauge due to the closed nature of the government, sparse independent reporting, and general fear of government retaliation for criticism of the ruling regime. However, based on available information, the government appeared to have sustained its efforts to prosecute and punish trafficking offenders in 2009. While the government appeared to continue positive steps toward improved treatment of victims and support of the anti-trafficking NGO community, the overall political climate of intimidation was a natural obstacle to authentic government partnerships with victims and anti-trafficking organizations. Funding for victim assistance programs codified into law in 2005 remained unrealized.

Belarus ratified the 2000 UN TIP Protocol in June 2003.

From 2017 to 2021, the government identified 753 victims of human trafficking (an average of 188 per year); 90% of them were female and 30% of them were children.

A Council of Europe report in 2022 concluded that Belarusian authorities were actively encouraging human trafficking; it also noted that many NGOs in the country who had been working against human trafficking had been dissolved.

In 2023, the Organised Crime Index gave Belarus a score of 7 out of 10 for human trafficking, noting that while legislation is in place, it is not widely used.

== Prosecution (2009) ==
The government sustained law enforcement efforts during 2009. Belarusian law prohibits trafficking in persons for both sexual exploitation and labor exploitation under Article 181 of its criminal code, which prescribes penalties ranging from two to 15 years’ imprisonment in addition to asset forfeiture. These penalties are sufficiently stringent and are commensurate with penalties prescribed for other serious crimes. The government reported 219 human trafficking investigations in 2009, including at least 10 labor trafficking investigations. Authorities reportedly prosecuted 61 cases under Article 181, and convicted 15 trafficking offenders under the same statute in 2009, down from 17 convictions in 2008. The government did not report how many of the convictions were for forced labor versus forced prostitution. Officials reported that the majority of convicted trafficking offenders were given imposed sentences of over eight years’ imprisonment, in addition to the forfeiture of assets.

While reports indicated that officials engaged in corrupt practices, there were no reports of government complicity in human trafficking during 2009 - such information may have been limited because of lack of press freedom and imprisonment of citizens for criticizing government officials in Belarus. In general, the judiciary lacked independence, trial outcomes usually were predetermined, and many trials were conducted behind closed doors. The Ministry of Interior continued to provide at least partial funding for its anti-trafficking training center, which has trained 47 Belarusian law enforcement officers and officials from other governments as trafficking specialists since 2007. Courses at the center reportedly focused on anti-trafficking law enforcement techniques and victim assistance, and were developed in partnership with IOM, other international organizations, and NGOs. The government reported partnerships with the following governments on trafficking cases: Poland, Germany, the Czech Republic, Israel, and Turkey.

== Protection (2009) ==
The government demonstrated minimal progress in protecting victims of trafficking during the reporting period, including a significant decrease in the number of victims identified. In 2009, authorities identified 369 victims of sex trafficking, including 35 children, and 29 labor trafficking victims in 2009, a significant decrease from a total of 591 victims identified in 2008. The government reported referring only 131 victims to service providers for assistance, raising concerns that the formal, national trafficking victim referral mechanism was not successfully implemented. Law enforcement officials generally referred trafficking victims to IOM or NGO shelters - which relied on donor funding - to provide short and longer term protection and rehabilitation; the government referred child trafficking victims to NGOs for assistance.

The government again failed to provide funding for specialized victim assistance programs pledged in a 2005 presidential decree, but provided some in-kind donations to NGOs. Victims could seek state medical assistance and some other services, such as vocational training, free of charge, but most victims declined assistance from government facilities. Government sources acknowledged that victims were more likely to trust NGOs than government sources of assistance. Anti-trafficking NGOs reported little government interference in their operations; they also reported improved communication with government officials during past year. In some instances during 2009, the government permitted NGO specialists to attend police interviews and closed court hearings upon victims’ requests.

The government claimed to have encouraged victims to participate in the investigation and prosecution of traffickers. The anti-trafficking training center reportedly emphasized the need to avoid coercing victims, which had been reported as a problem in the past. There were no reports of identified victims being penalized for unlawful acts committed as a direct result of being trafficked. Belarusian law allows for authorities to grant temporary residency status to foreign victims, though no victims chose this immigration relief during 2009.

== Prevention (2009) ==
The government demonstrated modest progress in trafficking prevention activities during 2009. Citizens, the media, and NGOs in Belarus are often subjected to government intimidation and strict control, which limited open discussion about the trafficking situation in the country. Officials continued to conduct press conferences and briefings on the anti-trafficking situation in Belarus, focusing primarily on forced prostitution, during 2009. The government aired IOM-sponsored anti-trafficking public service announcements on state television and on television screens in subway stops, which resulted in an increased number of calls to IOM’s hotline. The Ministry of Interior continued to run a hotline offering information regarding the licensing status and legitimacy of marriage, modeling agencies, and agencies involved in work and study abroad. NGO's reported cooperation between the government hotline and their own hotlines, as well as partnerships with authorities in distributing NGO-funded public awareness materials. There were reports that some policies described by the Belarusian government as anti-trafficking measures were responsible for restricting Belarusian citizens’ ability to travel abroad for legitimate purposes. The government’s national action plan on trafficking, which expired in 2010, focused on illegal migration which may lead to confusion between trafficking and smuggling.

== 2021 border dispute ==
In 2021, Belarus was accused of human trafficking when officials sent large numbers of migrants across the border to Poland and other neighbouring EU countries. There were allegations that authorities had deliberately arranged flights and transportation to the Polish border in response to EU sanctions. By mid-2024 there was only one official border crossing between the two countries.

== See also ==
- Human rights in Belarus
- Human trafficking in Europe
