= Human trafficking in Bosnia and Herzegovina =

In 2009 Bosnia and Herzegovina was primarily a source for Bosnian women and girls who were subjected to trafficking in persons, specifically forced prostitution within the country, though it was also a destination and transit country for foreign women and girls in forced prostitution in Bosnia and Western Europe. There were four identified victims from Serbia in 2009. Most trafficked women entered the country through Serbia or Montenegro. There were reports that some girls, particularly Roma, were trafficked, using forced marriage, for the purpose of involuntary domestic servitude, and that Roma boys and girls were subjected to forced begging by organized groups. There was one case involving Bosnian males recruited for labor and subjected to coercive conditions in Azerbaijan in 2009. NGO's report that traffickers frequently use intermediaries to bring clients to private apartments, motels, and gas stations where victims are held.

The Government of Bosnia fully complies with the minimum standards for the elimination of trafficking. The government made clear progress in its anti-trafficking law enforcement efforts during 2009 by significantly reducing its use of suspended sentences and imposing stronger penalties for convicted traffickers. The government employed proactive systematic procedures to identify potential victims throughout 2009, registering a greater number of trafficking victims, and referred them to NGO service providers which it funded.

The U.S. State Department's Office to Monitor and Combat Trafficking in Persons placed the country in "Tier 2" in 2017 and in 2023.

Although the government claimed compliance, the 2017 report noted the inability to fully meet the minimum standards for the elimination of trafficking but that it is making significant efforts to do so.

From 2017 to 2021, the government identified 306 victims of human trafficking (an average of 78 per year); most of them were children engaged in street begging.

Bosnia and Herzegovina ratified the 2000 UN TIP Protocol in April 2004.

== Prosecution ==
The Government of Bosnia made significant progress in its anti-trafficking law enforcement efforts over the last year, delivering one of the highest sentences for trafficking ever prosecuted in Bosnia. The government also reduced its use of suspended sentences and increased penalties for convicted traffickers. The Government of Bosnia prohibits trafficking for sexual and labor exploitation through Article 186 of its criminal code, which prescribes penalties of up to 10 years’ imprisonment. These penalties are sufficiently stringent and commensurate with those prescribed for other serious crimes, such as rape. The government amended its criminal code in 2009, setting a three-year minimum sentence for trafficking and increasing the minimum penalty for officials involved in trafficking. The national government successfully prosecuted a landmark trafficking case involving a high-level trafficker in 2009, sentencing the ringleader to 12 years in prison, fining him $14,286, and ordering the forfeiture of over $204,600 in assets.

In 2009, the national government investigated 14 suspected trafficking cases, and local authorities investigated 21 such cases. The national government prosecuted three cases involving 12 suspected trafficking offenders in 2009, and convicted 11 trafficking offenders; sentences for 11 convicted traffickers in two cases ranged from five months to 12 years’ imprisonment. Six of these sentences were over three years in length, and one suspect was acquitted. Courts in the Federation prosecuted seven cases, convicted 11 traffickers, and sentenced nine of them to one to three years. Finally, in the Republika Srpska, authorities reportedly prosecuted nine trafficking cases and convicted five trafficking offenders, resulting in sentences ranging from one to two years. State and local-level courts suspended sentences for two convicted traffickers in 2009, a notable decrease from 14 suspended sentences in 2008.

Under Bosnian law, many convicted offenders are eligible for weekend furloughs from prison; thus, some convicted traffickers in 2009 may have been released on weekends, posing a potential risk to their victims. There were continued anecdotal reports of police and other officials’ facilitation of trafficking, including by willfully ignoring or actively protecting traffickers or exploiters of trafficking victims in return for payoffs. In March 2010, the government arrested 16 suspects, including the Srebrenica deputy mayor, local religious officials, school officials, and police officers for their alleged involvement in the trafficking and forced prostitution of a Roma girl. The government reported all suspects were subsequently released two days after the arrests, citing lack of sufficient evidence to detain them. The State Minister of Security was also interrogated as a suspect. The investigation remains ongoing. Two local officials under investigation by the State Prosecutor for their December 2007 involvement in forced prostitution of three children were released from custody on February 12, 2009. In 2010 the government had yet to convict any government officials for trafficking-related complicity.

Prosecution is crucial in addressing the human trafficking problem in Bosnia and Herzegovina because, without it, the problem degenerates to a cycle. In this condition, the victims gets repatriated to their home countries only to be retrafficked, creating what some calls as repatriation factory.

== Protection ==
The Government of Bosnia made progress in identifying and protecting victims of trafficking in 2009. The government continued to provide sufficient funding to six local NGOs that provided shelter and medical and psychological assistance to foreign and domestic victims during 2009, providing $32,000 for the care of domestic victims and $71,400 for care to foreign victims of trafficking, including repatriation assistance. The government employed systematic proactive procedures for identifying and referring both foreign and domestic victims to NGO service providers, and registered 46 trafficking victims in 2009, an increase from 29 identified in 2008. Government-funded NGOs provided shelter to 18 victims during 2009; the remaining 28 victims received services from NGOs on an outpatient basis. The government encouraged victims to assist in the investigation and prosecution of traffickers, and relied on the voluntary cooperation of victims as witnesses in all of its prosecutions in 2009. However, a 2009 report issued by Dr. Gilly McKenzie of the Interpol Organized Crime Division, reported witness protection in Bosnia remained inadequate.

The government provided legal alternatives to the removal of foreign trafficking victims to countries where they face hardship or retribution through the provision of short- and long-term residence permits. In 2009, the government provided six victims with residence permits, an increase from the two permits the previous year. Police and border officers continued to employ systematic procedures for identifying trafficking victims among vulnerable populations, and the government continued to train its consular officials abroad on ways to identify potential trafficking victims among persons applying for Bosnian visas. The government ensured that identified victims were not penalized for unlawful acts committed as a direct result of their being trafficked; however, unidentified victims were likely inadvertently deported or occasionally prosecuted for immigration or other violations. The government failed to protect the confidentiality of an alleged underage sex trafficking victim during 2009 by allowing some media to disclose her full name and photo. While the government reported that authorities referred the victim to one of its shelters for care, the disclosure of her identity likely hampered the government's ability to adequately protect her.

== Prevention ==
Prevention initiatives undertaken by the government is based on the implementation of the 2016-2019 national anti-trafficking plan, which prescribed specific efforts to identify trafficking incidents and the protection of victims in cooperation with the Organization for Security and Co-operation in Europe (OSCE) and NGOs. For instance, the Office of the State Coordinator coordinates and supervises an NGO-funded comprehensive campaign targeted at young people seeking employment abroad that includes TV spots, billboards, and pamphlets. The government continued to fund an NGO's operation of an anti-trafficking hotline in 2009. The partnership with the OSCE also involved the training of prosecutors and judges to augment practical and theoretical knowledge on the elements of human trafficking as a crime as well as their role in addressing issues of victim and witness support within the judicial system. OSCE, for its part, is focused on working with domestic institutions and international partners to enhance the legislative and policy framework for human trafficking in the country.

The Bosnia and Herzegovina government continued to give specialized trafficking awareness training to Bosnian troops before their deployment on international peacekeeping missions. In partnership with the Norwegian government, it developed a manual for police, prosecutors, social centers and health care officials on preventing child trafficking. The government did not conduct any awareness campaigns specifically aimed at reducing demand for commercial sex acts or forced labor.

== See also ==
- Human rights in Bosnia and Herzegovina
- Human trafficking in Europe
