= Human trafficking in Serbia =

Serbia ratified the 2000 UN TIP Protocol in September 2001.

In 2008, Serbia was a source, transit, and destination country for women and girls trafficked transnationally and internally for the purpose of commercial sexual exploitation. Foreign victims were trafficked to Serbia from Macedonia, Ukraine, Moldova, Bosnia and Herzegovina, Bulgaria, Romania, Croatia, Albania, and the People's Republic of China. Serbia was a transit country for victims trafficked from Bosnia, Croatia, and Slovenia and destined for Italy and other countries. Internal sex trafficking of Serbian women and girls continued to increase as of 2007, comprising more than three-fourths of trafficking cases in 2007. Some children continued to be trafficked into forced labor or forced street begging. According to non-governmental organizations (NGOs) and law enforcement, efforts to shut down known brothels continue to prompt traffickers to better conceal victims of trafficking.

According to the U.S. government, in 2008 the government of Serbia did not fully comply with the minimum standards for the elimination of trafficking set out by the U.S., though it made significant efforts to do so. In 2007, the government increased national funding for combating trafficking in persons, actively investigated trafficking, prosecuted high-level cases, and took a step in addressing trafficking-related corruption by investigating and charging a state prosecutor for complicity. During 2007, the government improved its capacity to assist trafficking victims via the establishment of 11 new municipal teams made up of government officials and NGO representatives.

The U.S. State Department's Office to Monitor and Combat Trafficking in Persons placed the country in "Tier 2" in 2017. The country was on the Tier 2 Watch List in 2023.

In 2023, the Organised Crime Index gave the country a score of 6 out of 10 for human trafficking, noting that while the government works on its prevention, its provision for victims has gone down over recent years.

The 2023 GRETA report noted that the government was improving provision for victims, especially with legal aid and health care; however, prosecutors often see the crime as a lesser offence.

== Prosecution (2008) ==
The Government of Serbia actively investigates trafficking cases, though its court often imposes relatively lenient sentences on convicted trafficking offenders. The criminal code for Serbia criminally prohibits sex and labor trafficking in article 388 and prescribes penalties that are commensurate with those prescribed for other grave offenses, such as rape. In 2007, the government investigated and charged 62 persons with trafficking. The government reported at least 23 trafficking convictions in 2007. Trials often last months or years, and convicted traffickers often delay serving their sentences, sometimes by several years, by filing multiple appeals. This sometimes results in convicted traffickers remaining free and possibly continuing to exploit victims.

== Protection (2008) ==
The government cooperates with NGOs on victim assistance, but does not provide any funding for NGOs providing victims of trafficking with services such as counseling, legal assistance, and reintegration programs. The Agency for the Coordination of Protection of Victims of Trafficking reported the identification of 60 victims in 2007, including 26 minors; 48 of the 60 were Serbian victims. The government encouraged victims to assist in the investigation and prosecution of traffickers, according to NGOs in Serbia; 90 percent of victims reportedly participated in the investigation of their traffickers. However, many victims refuse to testify in court, out of fear of reprisals by their traffickers. The government used its 2006 Witness Protection Law to protect only one trafficking victim during the year. According to NGOs, trafficking victims were often directly or indirectly forced to testify against traffickers and some courts continue to demonstrate insensitivity to trafficking victims by scheduling victims and their accused traffickers to appear in court together, despite victims’ objections.

Serbian law allows victims to file civil suits against traffickers for compensation, but as of March 2008 no trafficking victim had been awarded compensation. Victims pursuing criminal or civil suits are entitled to temporary residence permits and may obtain employment or leave the country pending trial proceedings. The government awarded temporary residence status to a total of six victims in 2007. Identified victims are not detained, jailed, prosecuted, or otherwise penalized for unlawful acts committed as a direct result of their being trafficked. However, one NGO reported that authorities failed to identify some trafficking victims in 2007, resulting in their arrest, detainment, and subsequent deportation. To address this issue, the government expanded its training program for law enforcement. In 2007, thirty-seven trafficking victims were accommodated in two NGO shelters, 21 in a short-term shelter and 16 in transition housing (including two babies). Reintegration services were provided to 47 women and four men (including 22 children). During the reporting period, 11 new municipalities established social assistance teams composed of social workers, police, and NGO staff to provide assistance to potential victims of family violence and trafficking.

== Prevention (2008) ==
The Government of Serbia demonstrated mixed efforts in its prevention activities in 2007. The government has yet to begin implementation of its December 2006 National Strategy to Combat Trafficking in Persons. Furthermore, the government’s anti-trafficking team charged with leading Serbia’s anti-trafficking efforts met only once during the year. However, the government increased its educational prevention programs during the year, and in 2007, launched a fund-raising drive for the Agency for Coordination. It also sponsored a month of anti-trafficking programs on national television during October 2007. Although the government finalized scripts for a project to which it earmarked $100,000 for a 13-episode television series entitled “Modern Slavery,” NGOs expressed concerns about the series being completed. The government did not conduct any awareness campaigns aimed to reduce demand for commercial sex acts.

Although the government expanded its training program, with the help of U.N. Trafficking expert Dr. Gilly McKenzie, to educate law enforcement how to identify victims, concerns remained about victims sometimes not correctly identified and punished as a result of being trafficked.

== See also ==
- Human trafficking in Europe
