= Human trafficking in North Macedonia =

North Macedonia ratified the 2000 UN TIP Protocol in January 2005.

In 2010, North Macedonia was a source, transit, and destination country for women and children subjected to trafficking in persons, specifically forced prostitution and forced labor. Women and children from North Macedonia were trafficked internally within the country. Women and girls from Albania, Bulgaria and Kosovo were reportedly subjected to forced prostitution or forced labor in North Macedonia in 2009. Victims from North Macedonia and victims transiting through North Macedonia were subjected to forced prostitution or forced labor in South Central and Western Europe. Children, primarily ethnic Roma, were subjected to forced begging by their parents or other relatives. Girls were subjected to conditions of forced labor in bars and nightclubs in North Macedonia. A small number of men from North Macedonia were allegedly subjected to forced labor in Azerbaijan. Traffickers continued to operate in more hidden, private sectors in an attempt to conceal their exploitation of victims from law enforcement.

In 2010, the Government of North Macedonia did not fully comply with the minimum standards for the elimination of trafficking; however, it made significant efforts to do so. The government continued to strengthen its anti-trafficking framework and issued its first annual National Rapporteur’s report on trafficking. The government did not convict any trafficking offenders, identified fewer official trafficking victims, and did not provide funding to NGOs for the care and assistance of foreign and domestic trafficking victims in North Macedonia. The government did not prosecute any officials for trafficking specific crimes, but took significant steps in fighting trafficking-related corruption.

The U.S. State Department's Office to Monitor and Combat Trafficking in Persons placed the country in "Tier 2" in 2017 and 2023.

The 2023 GRETA report noted an improvement in the country's legal framework in tackling this crime. In the same year, the Organised Crime Index noted that the country had adopted a National Strategy to tackle the crime.

== Prosecution (2010) ==
The Government of North Macedonia made limited progress in its law enforcement response to human trafficking during the reporting period. The government prohibits sex and labor trafficking through Article 418(a) and (d) of its 2004 criminal code. In 2009, the government arrested 18 suspects for trafficking- related offenses and opened investigations of seven trafficking cases, of which five are ongoing. In the other two cases, the public prosecutor indicted and began prosecution in 2009. The government did not convict any trafficking offenders during the reporting period. In September 2009, the government adopted amendments to its criminal code that require a minimum sentence of eight years’ imprisonment for any public official convicted of a trafficking offense committed while in the course of official duty. The government investigated and prosecuted corruption in certain sectors of law enforcement, which posed challenges to anti-trafficking and anti-smuggling efforts during the reporting period. The government reported evidence of immigration officials’ forging residency documents of potential trafficking victims in 2009. The government did not prosecute or convict any officials for complicity specific to trafficking during the reporting period; however, it convicted 60 border police for soliciting bribes and, in a separate case, convicted one official of smuggling migrants in 2009.

== Protection (2010) ==
The Government of North Macedonia did not demonstrate sufficient progress in protecting trafficking victims in 2009. North Macedonia's victim identification procedures require that first-line responders liberally identify people, such as illegal migrants and foreign women and girls in prostitution, as potential victims until they can be formally vetted by a trained anti-trafficking authority. Of the 157 potential trafficking victims identified by authorities in 2009, seven were confirmed as trafficking victims; all were children. Eighteen victims were identified in 2008. With IOM assistance, the government organized a series of trainings reaching 280 front-line responders on proactive victim identification. These trainings were funded with the government's EU pre-accession funds, earmarked for trafficking. Additionally, in conjunction with the OSCE, the government trained all of the country's labor inspectors on proactive victim identification in the labor sector. North Macedonia's law exempts victims from criminal prosecution for unlawful acts committed as a direct result of being trafficked. While the government's standard operating procedures mandate a multi-disciplinary approach to identifying victims, NGOs and international organizations should be more systematically included in this process. The government continued to fund and operate a transit center for foreign migrants and trafficking victims with the help of a local NGO that specializes in victim rehabilitation, especially children. The government provided in-kind contributions to the NGO assisting foreign victims in this center. All potential victims are offered a two-month reflection period during which time they are offered victim assistance services, regardless of whether they choose to testify for the state. At any time during the reflection period, if they decide to cooperate with authorities in the investigation of the crime, an additional six-month residency permit can be granted. As an undocumented foreigner, until a foreign trafficking victim receives a legal residency status, his or her movement is restricted to within the shelter. During the reporting period, one foreign victim stayed in the transit center under the reflection period. No foreign victims to date have requested the six-month residency permit.

The largest NGO of North Macedonia providing protection and assistance to domestic trafficking victims continued to rely primarily on international donors to provide victims with both immediate and long-term comprehensive services for their rehabilitation and reintegration. Victims also received reintegration support from North Macedonia's 30 social welfare centers located throughout the country. The government provided significant funding to these centers, which are not focused exclusively on helping trafficking victims and, according to NGOs, lack the capacity to fully address the complex and comprehensive needs of domestic trafficking victims. These centers assisted seven trafficking victims in 2009, the same number assisted in 2008. Aware of this problem, the government is in the process of refurbishing a domestic shelter that will house domestic victims of trafficking. In 2009, the Ministry of Labor and Social Policy succeeded in obtaining funding from the national budget for operation of a domestic shelter.

Although the government drafted legislation to ensure that domestic trafficking victims receive free healthcare, a lack of implementation of this provision resulted in an NGO paying for some victims’ emergency medical care in 2009. During the reporting period, the government took over complete financial responsibility for the National Referral Mechanism Office, a coordinating body responsible for monitoring victim identification, referral, assistance, and legal processes. North Macedonia's law provides legal alternatives to the removal of foreign victims to countries where they may face retribution or hardship through both a two-month reflection period and a six-month residency permit. The government encouraged victims to participate in the prosecution of their traffickers; it reported that three victims provided witness testimony in courts and three assisted in law enforcement investigations in 2009. Reportedly, one of the reasons victims do not report their traffickers is because the traffickers tell the victims they have connections with the police.

== Prevention (2010) ==
The Government of North Macedonia made progress in its anti-trafficking prevention efforts. In January 2010, the government's newly appointed National Rapporteur published North Macedonia's first annual report on trafficking, which also covered migrant smuggling. The report was presented to the stakeholders, the international community, and NGOs for comment, but the final product lacked a comprehensive assessment of anti-trafficking efforts in North Macedonia and contained cursory recommendations for improvement. The government continued to rely on NGOs and international organizations to assist in conducting many of its anti-trafficking prevention programs; it forged partnerships with NGOs to distribute general anti-trafficking leaflets in specified locations and schools throughout 2009. It also translated IOM's “Buy Responsibly” campaign and in November 2009 began broadcasting it over state television as part of a campaign to target client demand for products potentially resulting from labor trafficking. The government continued seminars in the University of Skopje and collaborated with another NGO on a series of workshops that addressed client demand for victims of sex trafficking. It also provided $1,000 to an NGO to conduct trafficking prevention lectures to youth around the country in 2009. In September 2009, the government formally adopted its 2009-2012 National Action Plan on trafficking, and for the first time budgeted specific funding for the plan's implementation.

== See also ==
- Human rights in North Macedonia
- Human trafficking in Europe
