= Human trafficking in Kosovo =

Type of crime in Kosovo

Kosovo is a source, transit, and destination country for women and girls trafficked transnationally and internally for the purpose of commercial sexual exploitation.

From 2017 to 2021, the government identified a number of victims of human trafficking; most were females from within Kosovo, but 60% of victims were children, a large number of whom came from neighbouring countries (mainly Albania). In 2017, officials noted that most victims they met were girls aged under 18. A later study suggested that most victims were young adults from Moldova or Romania.

According to the U.S. State Department's 2022 Trafficking in Persons Report, Kosovo was a Tier 2 country, which is reserved for "Countries whose governments do not fully meet the TVPA’s minimum standards but are making significant efforts to bring themselves into compliance with those standards." The country kept its Tier 2 status in 2023.

== Interim Administration ==
Following the end of the Kosovo War in 1999, the United Nations Interim Administration Mission in Kosovo (UNMIK) took over administration of the country until its declaration of independence in 2008. In their 2004 report, Amnesty International declared that human trafficking in Kosovo had "become a major destination country for women and girls trafficked into forced prostitution" since the establishment of UNMIK. The United Nations Department of Peace Operations (DPKO) claimed that "peacekeepers have come to be seen as part of the problem in trafficking rather than the solution," whereas the UN Secretary General criticized contributing countries for failing to prosecute their nationals accused of wrongdoing.

== Republic of Kosovo's Response ==
According to the U.S. State Department's 2022 Trafficking in Persons Report, "The Government of Kosovo does not fully comply with the minimum standards for the elimination of trafficking." However, "it is making significant efforts to do so." It has increased law enforcement efforts and victim protection efforts, while maintaining efforts to prevent trafficking.

== See also ==
- Human trafficking in Europe
- Trafficking in human beings
