= Human trafficking in Hungary =

Hungary ratified the 2000 UN TIP Protocol in December 2006.

In 2010 Hungary was a source, transit, and destination country for women and girls subjected to trafficking in persons, specifically forced prostitution, and a source country for men and women in conditions of forced labor. Women from Hungary were forced into prostitution in Canada, the Netherlands, Switzerland, the United Kingdom, Denmark, Germany, Austria, Italy, Spain, Portugal, Ireland, Greece, and the United States. Women from eastern Hungary were subjected to forced prostitution in Budapest and areas in Hungary along the Austrian border. Roma women and girls who grew up in Hungarian orphanages are highly vulnerable to internal forced prostitution. Men from Western Europe traveled to Budapest for the purpose of adult sex tourism, some of which may have involved the exploitation of trafficking victims. Men and women were subjected to conditions of forced labor within Hungary. Women from Romania and Ukraine were transported through Hungary to the Netherlands, the United Kingdom, Denmark, Germany, Austria, Italy, Switzerland, France, and the United Arab Emirates where they were subsequently subjected to forced prostitution; some of these victims may have been exploited in Hungary before they reached their final destination country.

In 2010 the Government of Hungary did not fully comply with the minimum standards for the elimination of trafficking; however, it made significant efforts to do so. The government demonstrated law enforcement progress in 2009, including amending Paragraph 175/b of its criminal code to increase penalties for cases involving child victims of human trafficking under the age of 12 as well as an increase in the number of traffickers convicted and sentenced to time in prison, though it did not prosecute or convict any labor trafficking offenders. The government demonstrated mixed progress in improving victim assistance during the reporting period; while it allocated funding for a new NGO-run shelter that opened in March 2010 and guaranteed funding through June 2011, the shelter did not assist any victims during the reporting period. Moreover, the shelter is permitted only to assist Hungarian victims, excluding the assistance of any potential foreign victims. The lack of victim assistance funding by the government in 2008 and most of 2009 may have resulted in a decrease in victims assisted in 2009.

The U.S. State Department's Office to Monitor and Combat Trafficking in Persons placed the country in "Tier 2 Watchlist" in 2017. It was placed at Tier 2 in 2023.

The 2024 GRETA report noted that 754 victims were identified between 2019 and 2022 (mostly women, but with an increasing number of children); it also noted the new National Anti-Trafficking Strategy and increased access to free legal aid for victims.

== Prosecution (2010) ==
The Government of Hungary’s anti-human trafficking law enforcement efforts improved during the reporting period. Hungary prohibits all forms of trafficking through Paragraph 175/b of its criminal code, though prosecutors rely on other trafficking-related statutes to prosecute most trafficking cases. During the reporting period, the government amended Paragraph 175/b to increase penalties for cases involving child victims under the age of 12. Penalties prescribed in Paragraph 175/b now range from one year up to life imprisonment, which are sufficiently stringent and commensurate with those prescribed for other serious crimes, such as rape. Authorities note that because of a ruling by the Supreme Court of Hungary, prosecutors must meet strict evidentiary requirements for proving the crime of human trafficking under Paragraph 175/b, specifically that the prosecutor must prove that a victim of human trafficking is either bought or sold by another person; because of this standard, prosecutors generally use other statues to prosecute trafficking offenders. Police and border guards conducted 27 trafficking investigations, compared with 21 investigations in 2008. Authorities prosecuted 16 traffickers in 2009, compared with 18 in 2008. Convictions were obtained against 23 sex trafficking offenders in 2009, compared with 16 sex trafficking and two labor trafficking convictions in 2008. During the last year, the government did not report any prosecutions or convictions for labor trafficking offenses. In 2009, twenty of 23 convicted offenders were sentenced to time in prison, an improvement from 2008 when 11 out of 18 convicted offenders were sentenced to time in prison. Of those sentenced to prison in 2009, 12 convicted offenders received sentences of up to three years’ imprisonment, three offenders received sentences ranging from three to four years’ imprisonment, and five offenders received sentences of five years’ imprisonment. During the reporting period, 55 law enforcement officials received victim sensitivity training and victim identification training. The government also conducted three joint trafficking investigations with law enforcement authorities from the Netherlands, Germany, and Austria.

== Protection (2010) ==
The Hungarian government undertook modest steps to provide victim assistance during the reporting period; however, more should be done to ensure more victims have access to assistance. A total of 94 victims were identified by NGOs and government officials in 2009, compared with 88 reportedly identified in 2008. The government allocated approximately $61,000 to an NGO to establish a trafficking shelter that will operate through June 2010. Although this is an improvement from 2008, when the government did not provide funding for NGOs providing victim assistance including shelter, medical care, legal assistance, and psychological counseling, the government-funded shelter will only provide assistance to Hungarian victims; no victims were provided assistance in this shelter during the reporting period. Additionally, only 45 trafficking victims were provided assistance, including shelter, by one privately funded NGO during the reporting period, compared with 88 victims assisted in 2008. The lack of victim assistance funding by the government in 2008 and most of 2009 and the subsequent closure of one shelter in mid-2008 that had been provided free facility space by the government may have resulted in a decrease in the number of victims assisted in 2009. The government may have assisted some victims of trafficking through general crime victim programs in 2009, though the government was unable to provide the specific number of victims assisted by these programs.

The government-run trafficking hotline referred nine victims to NGOs for assistance last year, a decrease from 50 victims referred by the hotline in 2008. Law enforcement and consular officials identified approximately 30 victims domestically and abroad in 2009, compared with 26 in 2008. Both law enforcement and NGOs were often unaware or uncertain about what services victims of trafficking were eligible to receive; this lack of awareness may have limited the number of victims assisted during the reporting period. Victims were not penalized for unlawful acts committed as a direct result of being trafficked, and there were no reported cases of authorities’ mistreatment of trafficking victims. The government encouraged victims to assist with trafficking investigations and prosecutions; in 2009, twenty-seven victims assisted in the investigation and prosecution of trafficking cases. The government offered foreign victims a 30-day reflection period to decide whether to assist law enforcement; however, no foreign victims applied for or received the 30-day temporary residency permits in 2009. NGOs expressed concern that Hungarian victims were not provided with a reflection period to receive assistance and decide whether or not to assist law enforcement; instead, Hungarian victims were required to decide upon identification whether or not they wanted to assist law enforcement. Foreign victims may apply for a six-month temporary residency permit if they choose to cooperate with law enforcement.

== Prevention (2010) ==
The Hungarian government demonstrated modest efforts to raise awareness during the reporting period. The government again did not conduct any general anti-trafficking awareness campaigns focused on the general public or potential victims of trafficking; however, it did allocate $15,800 for a campaign targeted at potential consumers of prostitution in order to reduce demand for commercial sex acts. As reported in the 2009 Report, the three-month campaign started in March 2009 and consisted of radio advertisements, posters placed in 100 gas stations throughout Hungary, and information posted on the Ministry of Justice’s website that reportedly received 4,000 download requests. The Hungarian government actively monitored immigration and emigration patterns for evidence of trafficking.

== See also ==
- Human rights in Hungary
- Human trafficking in Europe
