= Crime in Montenegro =

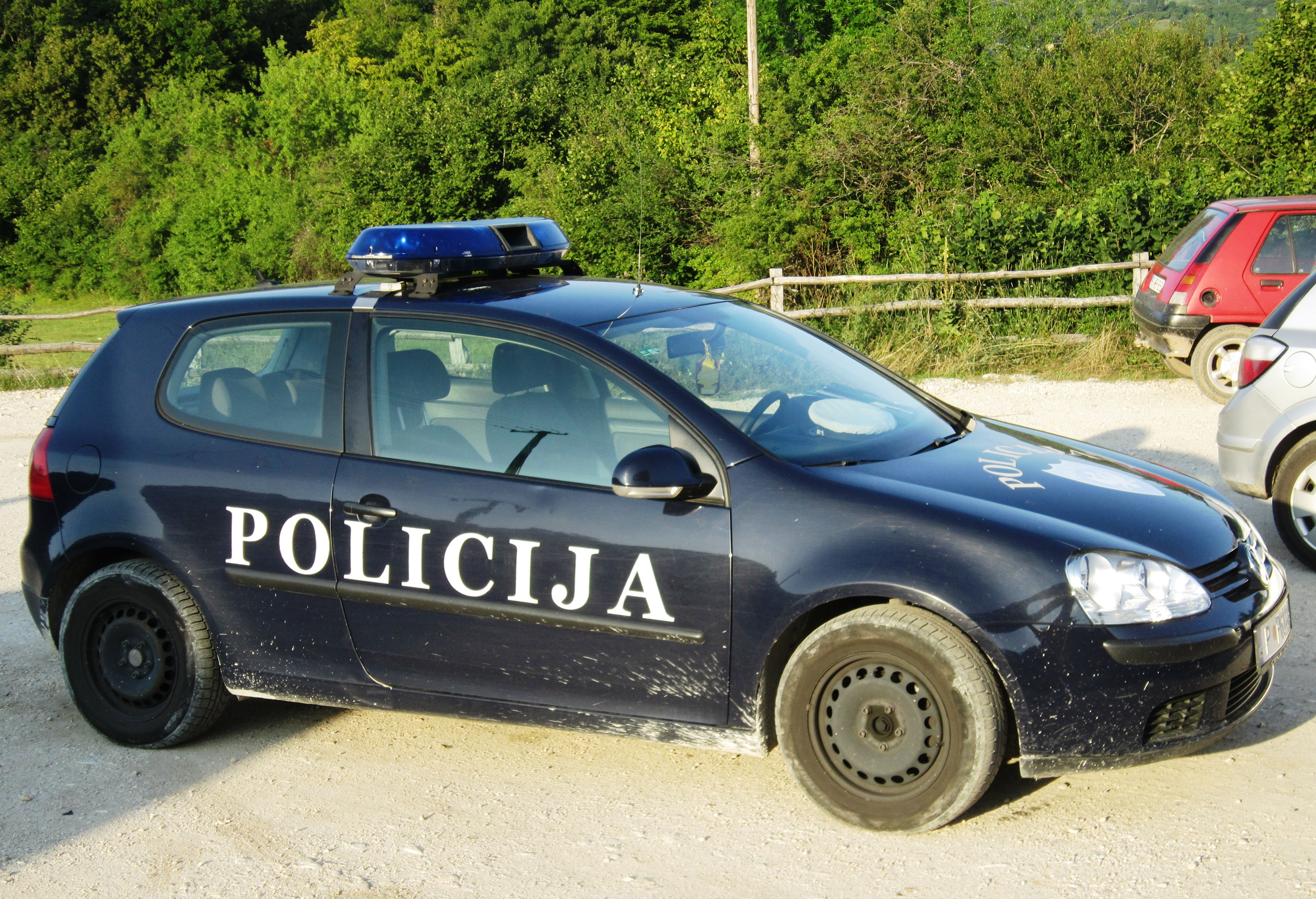
A vehicle of the Montenegro police.

Crime in Montenegro is combated by the Montenegro Police and other agencies.

== Crime by type ==
=== Murder ===
In 2012, Montenegro had a murder rate of 2.7 per 100,000 population. There were a total of 17 murders in Montenegro in 2012.

=== Organised crime ===
The Montenegrin mafia or Montenegrin Cartel are terms used for the various criminal organizations based in Montenegro or composed of Montenegrins. There are 700 documented organized criminals operating within Montenegro; outside of the country Montenegrin gangs are active throughout Europe-notably Serbia and Slovenia. The gangs tend to specialize in cigarette smuggling, narcotics and arms trafficking.

=== Human trafficking ===
Montenegro ratified the 2000 UN TIP Protocol in October 2006. In 2010 Montenegro was a transit, source, and destination country for men, women, and girls who were subjected to human trafficking, specifically conditions of forced prostitution and forced labor. Trafficking victims were mostly females from Ukraine, Moldova, Serbia, Romania, Bulgaria and Montenegro, who migrated or were smuggled through the country en route to other destinations and subjected to conditions of forced prostitution in Montenegro. Roma children were coerced into organized street begging in the country.

According to NGOs and international experts, mainly foreign men and boys were subjected to forced labor in Montenegro's growing construction industry. Montenegrin women and girls were subjected to forced prostitution within the country and in other Balkan countries; anecdotal reports indicated at least one Montenegrin girl was subjected to conditions of forced prostitution in Serbia during 2009. Anecdotal reports in 2009 also indicated some women and girls from Serbia and other countries in this region were subjected to conditions of forced prostitution in Montenegro. Criminal networks operating in Montenegro's expanding tourism industry were reportedly engaged in trafficking for the purpose forced prostitution. According to the Human Rights Commissioner for the Council of Europe, several sources question the Montenegrin government's official stance that Montenegro did not have a considerable trafficking problem. Reports state that there is a rampant problem of prostitution of Montenegrin girls in central and south Montenegro, where many of the clients are Albanians.

In 2010, the Government of Montenegro did not fully comply with the minimum standards for the elimination of trafficking; however, it made significant efforts to do so. Montenegro, for the first time, publicly acknowledged a trafficking problem in Montenegro. In 2009, the government improved the referral of some potential victims to providers of victim assistance, took initial steps to address trafficking-related complicity, and implemented anti-trafficking prevention programs aimed at vulnerable populations in Montenegro. However, NGOs and international organizations continued to report insufficient capacity among relevant government agencies to identify potential trafficking victims. Moreover, trafficking-related complicity impeded the government's ability to genuinely tackle its trafficking problem. Despite conducting numerous labor inspections of construction sites throughout the year, the government did not identify any suspected victims of forced labor in the construction sector during the year.

U.S. State Department's Office to Monitor and Combat Trafficking in Persons placed the country in "Tier 2 Watchlist" in 2017 and 2023.

==== Prosecution ====
The Government of Montenegro demonstrated some improvement in its law enforcement response to human trafficking in 2009. Montenegro prohibits sex and labor trafficking through Article 444 of its criminal code, which prescribes penalties of up to 10 years’ imprisonment - penalties that are sufficiently stringent and commensurate with those prescribed for rape. In 2009, the government investigated and prosecuted 14 trafficking suspects and convicted 11 trafficking offenders; courts acquitted three persons. Sentences imposed on the 11 convicted offenders ranged from one to five years in prison. According to the government, five convicted traffickers were actually serving their sentences at the time of this report. Under Montenegrin law, some convicted offenders, including traffickers, were entitled to four weekend furloughs a year, if they met certain conditions and have completed two-thirds of their jail time. During the reporting period, the government arrested and initiated prosecutions of 10 adults for organizing and forcing their own relatives, young Roma children, to beg.

The government, through its anti-trafficking National Coordinator, established a mechanism to greatly improve the government's ability to provide information on its anti-trafficking law enforcement efforts in 2009. According to a Council of Europe's 2009 Report, corruption involving low-level law enforcement and customs officials hampered the government's anti-trafficking efforts, particularly with officers working overtime providing security in bars and nightclubs. Notably, in February 2010, law enforcement officers arrested three policemen working as guards in night clubs in Podgorica and Ulcinj for their suspected involvement in the forced prostitution of girls. The government, however, subsequently charged these officers for abuse of authority. The government continued to mandate that all police trainees receive anti-trafficking training at an academy in Danilovgrad and continued to ensure one officer in each police station in Montenegro to handle trafficking cases. Throughout the year, the National Coordinator's office organized and funded anti-trafficking training of law enforcement personnel, members of the judiciary, and other stakeholders; through partnerships with the government, anti-trafficking NGOs provided government officials with specific training on the identification of trafficking victims and sensitive questioning techniques.

==== Protection ====
The Government of Montenegro made important progress in protecting trafficking victims in 2009. NGOs continued to report, however, that the government's implementation of victim identification procedures remained inadequate. The government funded a trafficking victim shelter during the reporting period, providing approximately $109,200 to cover the costs of the NGOs' provision of psychological care, legal aid, and vocational training to trafficking victims. The government improved its implementation of a formal victim referral mechanism, evident in its referral of an increased number of potential sex trafficking victims for care in 2009 – 13, compared with only two referred in 2008. Police also referred a higher number of Roma children subjected to conditions of forced begging in 2009. The government provided temporary care and shelter for most of these rescued children in the Center for Children and Youth. However, many of the suspected traffickers were believed to be the victim's relatives; 76 of these victims were returned to their places of residence in Serbia, Bosnia and Herzegovina. Local police misunderstanding of trafficking continued to be an impediment to proper victim identification; one international expert reported that police sometimes accused trafficking victims of being mentally disturbed.

During 2009, Montenegrin authorities conducted 13,518 labor inspections of construction sites and found 8,320 violations of labor standards, though there were no suspected victims of forced labor identified as a result of these inspections. The government encouraged victims to participate in the investigations or prosecutions of trafficking offenders, though in practice, few victims cooperated with authorities beyond giving statements to the police due to fear of reprisals. NGOs reported that victims often changed their initial statements to police out of fear. The government reported that it ensured that trafficking victims were not penalized for unlawful acts committed as a direct result of their being trafficked. The government reported it offered potential trafficking victims temporary residency status in Montenegro; however none of the potential trafficking victims chose to apply for this status in 2009.

==== Prevention ====
The Montenegrin government intensified its efforts in the prevention of human trafficking during the year, and for the first time, it acknowledged a human trafficking problem in Montenegro. During the reporting period, the government continued to fund various public awareness campaigns in partnership with international organizations to educate potential victims about trafficking. This included organizing round table discussions, anti-trafficking workshops, and poster and hotline advertisements; holding classes in schools; distributing anti-trafficking brochures and passport inserts; posting anti-trafficking billboards; and producing and broadcasting a trafficking documentary. Further, the government updated its website to increase anti-trafficking information provided to the public.

In October 2009, the government, in partnership with an NGO forum, conducted training on recognizing trafficked children in an orphanage in Bijela and among Roma children in the Konik refugee camp in Podgorica. In February 2010, the national anti-trafficking Office of TIP Coordinator, in coordination with OSCE organized a regional conference of national coordinators in the Balkans.

=== Corruption ===
Corruption is a serious problem in Montenegro. The European Commission finds in its Progress Report 2013 that efficiency in the fight against corruption is constrained by frequent legislative changes and the lax attitude among law enforcement authorities to investigate corruption allegations, especially those involving high-level officials.
