= Human trafficking in Germany =

Germany is a European source, point of transit, organization and destination country for women, children, and men subjected to trafficking in persons, specifically forced prostitution and forced labor.

The Government of Germany complies with the minimum standards for the elimination of trafficking, but has not implemented European Union recommendations to reduce sexual slavery. Available statistics indicate the majority of convicted labor and sex trafficking offenders were not required to serve time in prison, raising concerns that punishments were inadequate to deter traffickers. According to Eurostat, during 2022 Germany reported the highest number of victims of all EU countries.

U.S. State Department's Office to Monitor and Combat Trafficking in Persons placed the country in "Tier 2" in 2021, down from Tier 1 in 2017.

== Victims ==
Ninety percent of identified victims of trafficking for commercial sexual exploitation came from Europe, including 28 percent from Germany, 20 percent from Romania, and 18 percent from Bulgaria. Non-European victims originate in Nigeria, other parts of Africa, Asia, Europe and the Americas. Almost one-quarter of identified trafficking victims were children. The majority of identified sex trafficking victims have been exploited in bars, brothels, and apartments – approximately one third of identified sex trafficking victims reported that they had agreed initially to engage in prostitution. Victims of forced labor have been identified in hotels, domestic service, construction sites, and restaurants. Police estimate that gangs brought around 1,000 Chinese people to Germany over the past decade and forced them to work in restaurants under exploitative conditions.

== Prosecution ==
Most convicted traffickers are not required to serve time in prison; however, the Government of Germany has made some progress regarding the conviction of sex and labor trafficking offenders. Germany prohibits all forms of trafficking; trafficking for commercial sexual exploitation is criminalized in Section 232 of its Penal Code, and forced labor is criminalized under Section 233. Prescribed punishments in these statutes range from six months’ to 10 years’ imprisonment.

It is common practice for judges in Germany to suspend prison sentences of two years or less for all crimes, including trafficking. Authorities prosecuted 173 persons for sex trafficking in 2008, the last year for which statistics were available. Of those, 138 were convicted, including seven juveniles, up from 123 convictions for sex trafficking in 2007. Of the 131 adults convicted, 92 – or 70 percent – received either a fine or a suspended sentence. Prison sentences for the remainder ranged from two to 10 years imprisonment.

Authorities prosecuted 25 persons for labor trafficking in 2008; 16 were convicted, including seven juveniles, up from eight labor trafficking convictions in 2007. Of the nine adult labor trafficking offenders, one received a sentence of between three and five years imprisonment and the remaining eight received suspended sentences or fines. Police boosted efforts against labor trafficking in 2008—more than 1,300 police officers and customs officials took part in raids in several cities. There were no reports of trafficking-related complicity of government officials during the reporting period. The government, in partnership with NGOs, provided a range of specialized anti-trafficking training to judges, prosecutors, and police. The federal criminal police counter-trafficking office coordinated international trafficking cases and promoted partnership with other countries by offering training programs for foreign law enforcement.

== Protection ==
The German government provided economical means with a value of €500,000 for victim protection during the reporting period. The Federal Family Ministry used the funds to capitalize an umbrella organization representing 39 NGOs and counseling centers that provided or facilitated shelter, medical and psychological care, legal assistance, and other services for victims. The majority of these NGOs focused on adult, female victims; however, a number of NGOs, in cooperation with local governmental youth welfare services, also attended to child victims. Some of these NGOs also made their services available to male victims. The government continued to distribute formal guidelines on victim identification techniques to police, counseling centers, prosecutors and judges. According to the federal police, authorities pro-actively identified 38 percent of all victims registered by the government in 2008. Authorities registered 676 sex trafficking victims and 96 forced labor victims in 2008, down from 689 sex trafficking victims and 101 forced labor victims identified in 2007. Formal victim referral mechanisms existed in 12 out of 16 German states. The government publicly encourages victims to cooperate in anti-trafficking investigations; however, police and NGOs reported that victims were often reluctant to assist law enforcement officials due to fear of retribution from traffickers. The government provided legal alternatives to foreign victims’ deportation to countries where they may face hardship or retribution. Trafficking victims were provided a 30-day reflection period to decide whether to cooperate with investigators.

Victims who agreed to act as witnesses were only provided temporary residence permits for the duration of trial proceedings, and in very rare circumstances long-term residence permits, such as when the victim faced severe threats in the country of origin.

The government reportedly did not penalize victims for unlawful acts committed as a direct result of being trafficked. The governmental German Institute for Human Rights in July 2009 began a $800,000 project to assist trafficking victims in claiming their financial rights in German courts, as some victims had made claims for financial compensation.

== Prevention ==
The government made some progress in trafficking prevention activities during the reporting period. The government sustained funding for NGOs that produced public awareness campaigns in Germany and abroad through websites, postcards, telephone hotlines, pamphlets, and speaking engagements.

The government did not take measures to reduce the demand for commercial sex acts or focus public awareness on potential clients in some of Germany’s best known red light districts, such as the one in Hamburg. A Berlin NGO, funded largely by the Berlin Senate, operated a trafficking awareness website directed at clients of the sex trade. The German Federal Police published an annual report containing statistics about its anti-trafficking activities. The Labor Ministry commissioned a study in 2009 to assess the extent of and government response to labor trafficking. The Federal Family Ministry, which has the responsibility for implementing the national anti-trafficking action plan, chaired a federal-state interagency working group on female sex trafficking. The Ministry of Foreign Affairs contributed approximately $297,000 toward anti-trafficking projects in Ukraine, Moldova, and the Mekong region. The government sustained a partnership with ECPAT to promote awareness of the child sex tourism problem; there were no reports of new prosecutions for child sex tourism by German citizens abroad during the reporting period. The government provided trafficking awareness training to commanders of German military units prior to their deployment abroad on international peacekeeping missions; the training focused on how the commanders could sensitize subordinates to human trafficking.

== See also ==
- Human rights in Germany
- Prostitution in Germany
- Immigration and crime in Germany
