= Human trafficking in Russia =

In 2009, efforts to crack down on human trafficking in Russia focused not only on the men, women, and children who were illegally shipped out of Russia to undergo forced labor and sexual exploitation in other countries, but also those who were illegally brought into Russia from abroad. The Government of the Russian Federation has made significant progress in this area since 1999, but a report commissioned by the United States Department of State in 2010 concluded that much more needed to be done before Russia could be taken off its Tier 3 watchlist.

Russia ratified the 2000 UN TIP Protocol in May 2004.

The U.S. State Department's Office to Monitor and Combat Trafficking in Persons placed the country in "Tier 3" in 2017. The country was still at Tier 3 in 2023, with the U.S. report noting that it was one of eleven countries which were seen as having a documented government policy or pattern of human trafficking.

In 2023, the Organised Crime Index noted that children in the occupied areas of Ukraine were at risk of human trafficking.

== Human trafficking ==
In 2009, the International Labour Organization reported that forced labor is the most predominant form of trafficking in Russia. Men, women and children from Russia and from other countries—such as Belarus, Kyrgyzstan, Tajikistan, Uzbekistan, Ukraine and Moldova—are subjected to conditions of debt bondage and forced labor, including in the construction industry, in textile shops, and in the agricultural and fishing sectors. An estimated 20,000 men and women from North Korea are annually brought in to Russia, and subjected to conditions of forced labor in Russia. Women and children from Nigeria, Central Asia, Ukraine, China, Moldova and Africa are subjected to forced prostitution and forced begging in Moscow and St. Petersburg. Men from Western Europe and the United States travel to Western Russia, specifically St. Petersburg, for the purpose of child sex tourism. The number of child trafficking victims in these cities is decreasing; experts credit this to aggressive police investigations and Russian cooperation with foreign law enforcement.

The North Korean regime provides contract labor for logging camps operated by North Korean companies in the Russian Far East. There are allegations that this labor is exploitative, specifically that the North Korean government and North Korean companies keep up to 85 percent of the wages paid to the workers and that workers' movement is controlled. Although there have been instances in which government officials were investigated, prosecuted, and convicted for trafficking in recent years, allegations of widespread complicity persist.

== Prosecution ==
=== Legislation ===
Article 127 of the Russian Criminal Code prohibits both trafficking for commercial sexual exploitation and forced labor. Other criminal statutes are also used to prosecute and convict traffickers. Article 127 prescribes punishments of up to five years' imprisonment for trafficking crimes; aggravating circumstances may extend penalties up to 15 years' imprisonment. Article 152 states that all purchasing or selling of a minor is punishable by up to 5 years in prison. More commonly, people guilty of human trafficking are charged under Article 240 and 241, which involve affiliation with prostitution and brothels, as these crimes are easier to prove in court.

In July 2006, the Russian government passed asset forfeiture legislation that permits prosecutors to forfeit the assets of convicted persons, including traffickers. Some law enforcement officials were provided with anti-trafficking training; however, this training was sporadic and limited to a small number of police officers, investigators, and prosecutors.

In 2009, police conducted 102 trafficking investigations under Article 127, and prosecuted 99 individuals, 76 of whom were convicted and prescribed sentences ranging from six months' to 13 years' imprisonment.

In 2013, Russia's Foreign Ministry for Human Rights Konstantin Dolgov said about the authors of the US Department of State's Trafficking in Persons Report, it is an "unacceptable ideological approach that divides nations into rating groups depending on the US State Department's political sympathies or antipathies." This was in response to Russia being demoted to the Tier 3 status. Russia has since withdrawn giving federal statistics involving human trafficking to the US State Department, however various NGO's and other organizations are still cooperating with foreign agencies.

In 2013, 28 people were convicted under Article 127.1, where 23 given sentences ranging from between 2 and 11 years' imprisonment.

=== Allegations of complicity ===
Corruption has been identified as both an "underlying root cause and a facilitating tool" for human trafficking, ensuring that it "remains a low-risk, high profit crime". Corruption can take many forms, including forging documents, and falsifying travel visa's and documents, as well as protection money to the officials to ensure a lack of investigation.

The Government of the Russian Federation has demonstrated minimal progress in combating government complicity in human trafficking. In February 2010, several media sources reported on one allegation that a high-level official in the Ministry of Internal Affairs was involved in a forced labor trafficking ring spanning from 2006 through 2008. In that case, members of the elite riot police allegedly kidnapped dozens of migrant workers and forced them to work on police construction projects and also the personal homes of high-level police officials. In January 2010, a senior district police commissioner in Astrakhan was convicted and sentenced to eight years' imprisonment for taking passports and travel documents from migrants and forcing them to work as agricultural laborers.

During the reporting period in 2009, the Moscow district military court prosecuted, convicted, and sentenced one senior military officer to 10 years' imprisonment for organizing an international sex trafficking syndicate which was allegedly responsible for trafficking 130 women and girls between 1999 and 2007; the government did not report whether two additional high-level government officials investigated by authorities in this case in 2008 were prosecuted or convicted during the reporting period.

The government reported no progress on two additional investigations reported in the 2009 TIP Report—one investigation involved a low-level police officer arrested for trafficking women to the U.A.E. and the second investigation involved two low-level police officers arrested for trafficking women within Russia for forced prostitution; these investigations were still on-going at the end of the reporting period. There was no updated information on whether the three officials that were arrested for trafficking-related complicity in 2007—as reported in the 2008 and 2009 TIP Reports—were prosecuted, convicted, or punished during the reporting period. There was no updated information on whether the five military officials investigated in 2007 for the labor exploitation of military conscripts under their command were prosecuted, convicted, or punished for their actions during the reporting period.

=== Lack of investigation ===
Many officials share a lack of initiative with respect to instigating an investigation. There are many reasons for this. One is the centralized, hierarchical policing system. Investigation and prosecution are divided into 2 groups. These groups answer to the MVD. For fear of reprimand, lower ranking officials are less inclined to initiate investigations. Investigations into human trafficking are only conducted with consent from higher-ranking officials. Furthermore, investigations are extended as there is no cross-agency to encourage cooperation with prosecution and investigation.

This systemic reluctance is clearly exemplified by the notorious Golyanovo slaves case. In this instance, local police officers were found to be complicit in the forced labor and abuse of grocery store workers, frequently returning escaped victims to their captors. Consequently, local law enforcement had a vested interest in avoiding an investigation into their own corruption. At the same time, higher-ranking MVD officials reportedly stalled the investigation and covered up the crimes to prevent tarnishing the ministry's public reputation. The case highlights how police complicity and the institutional desire to protect the department's image severely hinder the prosecution of human trafficking networks in Russia.

=== Criminal syndicates ===
It can be hard to combat organized criminal groups involved in trafficking, since the groups are generally small; no group seized in Russia in connection with human trafficking has had more than twenty members. A typical group has only ten members, not counting co-conspirators based in other countries. Very big Russian criminal syndicates like Solntsevskaya Bratva don't involve themselves in human trafficking as dealers, but as buyers of victims, to put to work in their casinos, restaurants and brothels. It is unknown exactly how many mafia-run establishments employ trafficked workers, but casinos in Las Vegas which belong to Russian mafia employ Russian hostesses as cheap labour and sexual service providers. The FBI claims that Russian mafia syndicates function on the whole territory of US, with a 2006 report revealing 8,000 women forced into prostitution from Slavic republics of former USSR, and 3,000 criminals involved in sexual exploitation.

== Victim protection ==
The Russian government demonstrated very limited efforts to protect and assist victims during the reporting period. The government also showed inadequate efforts to identify victims; the majority of assisted victims continued to be identified by NGOs or international organizations. Some municipalities across Russia had cooperation agreements between NGOs and local authorities to refer victims for assistance, though there was no national policy or system of victim referrals. In November 2009, the government failed to allocate funding to prevent the closure of the IOM-run shelter and rehabilitation center in Moscow. The shelter and rehabilitation center opened in March 2006 with foreign funding and assisted 423 victims of both sex and labor trafficking, including men and women, through November 2009; its closing created a significant void in the availability of medical, rehabilitative, and reintegration services for trafficking victims.

The Russian government continued to lack national policies and national programs to provide specific assistance for trafficking victims. The majority of aid to NGOs and international organizations providing victim assistance continued to be funded by international donors. Some local governments reportedly provided in-kind and modest financial support to some anti-trafficking NGOs. A local government in the Russian Far East provided facility space and funding amounting to approximately $3,732 for utilities for a shelter for victims of domestic violence and trafficking that opened in February 2009, although the majority of the shelter's operation costs were funded by a foreign donor during the reporting period. The shelter did not receive adequate funding during the entire reporting period to consistently assist victims of trafficking, though efforts were underway to secure funds from a foreign donor for repatriation, medical services, and other specialized services for trafficking victims. Three of these victims were referred to the shelter for assistance by local government officials; the fourth victim was referred to the shelter by a Russian Consulate official in Guangzhou, China.

The city of St. Petersburg has funded and provided in-kind assistance to several local NGOs and the Russian Red Cross to conduct outreach programs to identify and assist street children, many of whom are victims of forced prostitution. The local government in Kazan continued to provide modest in-kind assistance to another foreign-funded trafficking shelter. Although the government did not track the number of victims assisted by local governments and NGOs in 2009, some victims of trafficking were provided with limited assistance at regional and municipal-run government-funded domestic violence and homeless shelters. However, the quality of these shelters varied and they were often ill-equipped to provide for the specific legal, medical, and psychological needs of trafficking victims. Many foreign and Russian victims found in regions where they did not reside were denied access to state-run general health care and social assistance programs, as local governments restricted eligibility to these services to local registered residents.

In 2009, IOM and NGOs reported assisting at least 143 victims of human trafficking—including 139 victims assisted by the IOM rehabilitation center in Moscow prior to its closure in November 2009. Government authorities referred at least 12 victims for assistance in 2009, compared with approximately 56 victims referred by authorities in 2008. In 2009, at least one victim of forced labor was placed in the witness protection program as part of an investigation conducted in the Russian Far East and was encouraged to participate in the trafficking investigation; authorities in some communities in Russia encouraged victims to participate in trafficking investigations and prosecutions.

In January 2010, the government placed four identified victims of sex trafficking from Africa in a temporary detention facility for foreign nationals pending deportation; the government did not report whether these victims were deported from Russia nor did it report efforts to handle these women as victims rather than illegal migrants, such as efforts to refer these victims to NGOs for assistance. In theory, foreign victims were permitted to reside in Russia pending the investigation and prosecution of their trafficker and may petition for asylum to remain in Russia. In March 2010, a news report alleged that a victim of forced labor from North Korea, who had previously fled from a logging camp, was approached by several men in plain clothing, and told to get into a vehicle before he was able to meet with officials from the international community to seek assistance; the article noted the possibility that the victim could be deported to North Korea, where he faced possible torture, imprisonment, and execution for escaping from the logging camp. The victim's immigration status and location were unknown at the end of 2009.

== Prevention ==
The federal government did not demonstrate significant efforts to raise awareness and prevent trafficking over the reporting period; however, a local government in the Russian Far East conducted outreach to students at schools and universities to sensitize them to the prevalence of trafficking. In Yekaterinburg, local governments continued to run two labor migration centers that provided legal, employment, and shelter services to labor migrants; services of this nature decreased migrants' vulnerability to becoming victims of trafficking. The Ministries of Internal Affairs and Foreign Affairs continued to place warnings on their respective websites about human trafficking. In September 2009, the government created the position of Ombudsman for Children's Rights, a step that may lead to improved efforts to prevent child trafficking; however, the ombudsman's mandate currently does not include specific anti-human trafficking responsibilities. The government did not take specific steps to reduce the demand for commercial sex acts. The government did not report trafficking-specific training for its troops deployed abroad as part of international peacekeeping missions. The government did not support efforts to develop a labor trafficking awareness campaign in advance of the 2014 Winter Olympics in Sochi.

== See also ==
- Human rights in Russia
- Human trafficking in Europe
- Human trafficking in India
- Human trafficking in Indonesia
