= Temporary resident =

A temporary resident is a foreign national granted the right to stay in a country for a certain length of time (e.g. with a visa or residency permit), without full citizenship. This may be for study, business, or other reasons.

Various countries have their own rules or policies relating to temporary residency:-

- North America
  - Temporary residency in the United States
  - Temporary residency in Canada
- South America
  - Temporary Residency in Brazil
- Asia:
  - Temporary residency in China
- European Union:
  - Visa policy of the Schengen Area
  - German residence permit
  - Temporary residency in the Czech Republic
  - Temporary residency in Poland
  - Temporary residency in Estonia
  - Temporary residency in Lithuania
- Other
  - Temporary residency in Australia
  - Temporary residency in South Africa

== See also ==
- Travel visa
- Immigration
- Permanent resident
- Nationality law
- Expatriate
- Right of asylum
- Foreign worker
- Residence permit
