= Human trafficking in Romania =

Romania is a source, transit, and destination country for men, women, and children subjected to trafficking in persons, specifically conditions of forced labor and women and children in forced prostitution.

Parts of the Roma ethnic minority (with historical origins in India) in Romania are subjected to conditions of forced labor (including forced begging) by their fellow Roma gangs or even by their own family.They are also forced to beg in Spain, Italy, the Czech Republic, Greece, Finland, Portugal, Germany, the United Kingdom, Ireland, Cyprus and France.

Women and children from Romania are victims of forced prostitution in Italy, Spain, the Netherlands, the United Kingdom, Ireland, Greece, Germany, Cyprus, Austria, and France. People are trafficked within the country for commercial sexual exploitation and forced labor, including forced begging and petty theft. Human trafficking is a crime against humanity.

The country ratified the 2000 UN TIP Protocol in December 2022.

The U.S. State Department's Office to Monitor and Combat Trafficking in Persons placed the country in "Tier 2" in 2017 and 2023.

== Background in 2009 ==
In 2009, the majority of trafficking victims identified within the country were victims of forced labor. Romania was a destination country for a small number of women from Moldova, Colombia, and France who were forced into prostitution. The majority of identified Romanian victims were victims of forced labor, including forced begging.

The Government of Romania did not fully comply with the minimum standards for the elimination of trafficking; however, as of 2009 it had been making significant efforts to do so. Although more than half of the victims identified in 2009 were victims of forced labor, the government was again unable to report significant efforts to address labor trafficking; specifically, the government did not disaggregate labor trafficking law enforcement statistics from sex trafficking statistics and thus was unable to report the number of labor trafficking investigations, prosecutions, and convictions, or the number of labor victims assisted by the government during the reporting period.

In March 2009, the government reorganized its lead anti-trafficking agency - the National Agency Against Trafficking in Persons (NAATIP). It was changed from an independent, national agency with the authority to administer federal funding for anti-trafficking initiatives, to a subordinate agency of the National Police under the Ministry of Interior.

A U.N. Trafficking Expert, Dr. Gilly McKenzie, reported that the reorganization of NAATIP had a significant, negative impact on victim assistance during the year. Specifically, the government was much less cooperative with anti-trafficking NGOs and it allocated no federal funding for NGOs to provide victim services and conduct anti-trafficking prevention programs. As a result, nearly 30 anti-trafficking NGOs either closed or changed their focus to issues other than human trafficking in order to retain federal funding; some of these NGOs provided critical victim assistance including shelter, counseling, vocational training, and other rehabilitative care for victims.

The number of victims who received government-funded assistance significantly decreased for another consecutive year, and the government identified significantly fewer victims compared with the previous reporting period. NGOs and international organizations reported that the reorganization of NAATIP has left Romania without a true national agency to provide direction to other ministries with anti-trafficking responsibilities.

== International response ==
From 2016 to 2019, Romania identified 2,613 victims of human trafficking (an average of almost 18 people per week); 75% were female and 50% were children.

In 2021, the Organised Crime Index noted that Romania was one of the top 5 countries in the EU for human trafficking, with most people being moved from Pakistan and the Philippines.

== Prosecution (2010) ==
Romania demonstrated law enforcement efforts over the reporting period; however, it did not report the number of investigations, prosecutions, and convictions obtained against labor trafficking offenders. Romania prohibits all forms of trafficking in persons through Law No. 678/2001, which prescribes penalties of three to 15 years' imprisonment. These penalties are sufficiently stringent and commensurate with penalties prescribed for other serious crimes, such as rape. From 1 February 2014, human trafficking is prohibited through article 210 of the Penal Code.

In 2009, authorities investigated 759 cases - including some investigations started in 2008, compared with 494 new cases in 2008. The government prosecuted 303 individuals for trafficking in 2009, compared with 329 individuals prosecuted in 2008. During the reporting period, Romania convicted 183 trafficking offenders, up from 125 individuals convicted in 2008. During the reporting period, only 39 percent - 72 of the 183 - of convicted trafficking offenders served some time in prison; one offender was sentenced to up to six months' imprisonment, 54 offenders were sentenced to five to 10 years' imprisonment, six offenders were sentenced to 10 to 15 years' imprisonment, and one child offender was sentenced to an undisclosed amount of time in prison. The remaining 111 convicted trafficking offenders did not receive imposed prison sentences.

In 2009, Romanian law enforcement officials forged partnerships with foreign counterparts from five countries, leading to the arrest of at least 16 trafficking offenders and the identification of at least 107 victims. There were no reports that government officials were involved in trafficking during the reporting period.

== Protection (2010) ==
The Government of Romania significantly decreased its efforts to protect and assist victims of trafficking during the reporting period. In 2009, the government provided no funding for anti-trafficking and victim-service NGOs, compared with $270,000 provided to four NGOs in 2008. This lack of government funding caused a significant decrease in the number of victims assisted by both government agencies and NGOs. In 2009, the government identified 780 victims - including at least 416 identified victims of forced labor and at least 320 identified victims of forced prostitution, a significant decrease from 1,240 victims identified in 2008. Of those victims identified in 2009, 176 were children, trafficked for both forced labor and prostitution.

The government did not undertake proactive measures to identify potential victims among populations vulnerable to trafficking, including illegal migrant detention centers. No foreign victims were identified by the government or NGOs in 2009. Although the government continued to operate nine shelters for victims of trafficking, their quality varied and many victims preferred to go to NGO-operated shelters. Local governments were tasked with providing victims access to various types of assistance; however, the national government provided local governments with no funding, training, or guidance, and the capacity of local governments to address human trafficking was virtually nonexistent during the reporting period.

The government reported that approximately 365 victims were provided with some type of government-funded assistance, compared with 306 victims assisted by the government in 2008. An additional 32 victims were assisted by non-government funded programs, compared with 234 victims assisted by NGOs in 2008.

Government authorities referred all 780 identified victims for assistance, compared with 540 victims referred for assistance in 2008. Victims were encouraged to participate in trafficking investigations and prosecutions; 158 victims served as witnesses in 2009, a significant decrease from 1,053 victims who assisted law enforcement in 2008. The law provides that foreign victims were eligible to benefit from a 90-day reflection period to remain in the country and decide whether they would like to cooperate in a criminal proceeding; however in practice, no foreign victims used this reflection period. The law permits foreign victims to request a temporary residence permit and remain in the country until completion of the trafficking investigation and prosecution; in 2009, no foreign victims applied for and received temporary residence permits.

While the rights of victims were generally respected and identified victims were not punished for unlawful acts committed as a direct result of being trafficked, some judges continued to be disrespectful toward female victims of sex trafficking which discouraged victims from participating in trafficking cases.

== Prevention (2010) ==
Romania maintained its efforts to raise awareness during the reporting period. The government conducted a public campaign to raise awareness about sex trafficking entitled "The Two-Faced Man". This campaign reached an estimated audience of 620,000 and ran for three months, consisting of advertisements for television and radio and posters displayed on public transportation. The government also conducted an awareness campaign targeted at approximately 30,000 school children and 530 teachers. The government concluded its demand reduction campaign targeted at clients of potential victims of forced prostitution and forced labor in June 2009.

== See also ==
- Human rights in Romania
- Human trafficking in Europe
- Legal affairs of the Tate brothers
