= Human trafficking in Bulgaria =

Bulgaria ratified the 2000 UN TIP Protocol in December 2001.

In 2010 Bulgaria was a source and, to a lesser extent, a transit and destination country for women and children who are subjected to trafficking in persons, specifically forced prostitution and men, women, and children subjected to conditions of forced labor. Bulgarian women and children were subjected to forced prostitution within the country, particularly in resort areas and border towns, as well as in the Netherlands, Belgium, France, Austria, Germany, the Czech Republic, Finland, Portugal, Greece, Italy, Spain, Poland, Switzerland, Turkey, Cyprus, and North Macedonia. Bulgaria women and children of Roma descent were the most vulnerable to trafficking, especially as it related to sex trafficking and early childhood marriage. Bulgarian men, women, and children were subjected to conditions of forced labor in Greece, Italy, Spain, and the United Kingdom. Some Bulgarian children were forced into street begging and petty theft within Bulgaria and also in Greece and the United Kingdom.

In 2010 the Government of Bulgaria did not fully comply with the minimum standards for the elimination of trafficking; however, it made significant efforts to do so. In 2009, Bulgaria amended Section 159 of its criminal code and increased the minimum penalty for trafficking offenses from one year's imprisonment to two years’ imprisonment. The government investigated trafficking-related complicity among officials at various levels of government, although efforts to prosecute complicit officials remained limited. While Bulgaria continued its overall efforts to assist and protect most victims of trafficking, two victims identified during the year were punished for crimes committed as a direct result of trafficking.

The U.S. State Department's Office to Monitor and Combat Trafficking in Persons placed the country on the "Tier 2 Watchlist" in 2017.

In 2019, human trafficking in Bulgaria were classified again as Tier 2. It was noted that the Bulgarian government did not fully meet the minimum standards for the elimination of human trafficking. However, it was reported that increasing efforts were being made to provide more funds to support victims. In addition, two new facilities for victims of human trafficking were opened in Sofia. Compared to 2016, twice as many victims were identified and more traffickers were convicted.

The country was placed on the Tier 2 Watch List in 2023.

== Prosecution (2010) ==
The Bulgarian government sustained its strong anti-trafficking law enforcement response to human trafficking over the reporting period. Bulgaria prohibits trafficking for both commercial sexual exploitation and forced labor through Section 159 of its criminal code, which prescribes penalties of between two and 15 years’ imprisonment. These penalties are sufficiently stringent and commensurate with those prescribed for other serious crimes, such as rape. In 2009, police conducted 131 new trafficking investigations including nine labor trafficking investigations, compared with 187 sex trafficking and 25 labor trafficking investigations conducted in 2008. In 2009, authorities prosecuted 77 individuals for sex trafficking and four for forced labor compared with 79 persons prosecuted for sex trafficking and eight for labor trafficking in 2008. A total of 83 trafficking offenders were convicted - 80 for sex trafficking and three for labor trafficking offenses - compared with 66 sex trafficking offenders and three labor trafficking offenders convicted in 2008. In 2009, 51 of the 83 convicted trafficking offenders were sentenced to imprisonment, a significant increase from 25 convicted offenders sentenced to serve time in prison in 2008. The government did not report the sentence ranges for those convicted trafficking offenders sentenced to time in prison. During the reporting period, the government partnered with NGOs and IOM to provide trafficking-specific training to 34 judges, 19 prosecutors, 60 labor inspectors, and 60 police officers. Bulgarian law enforcement officials also partnered with law enforcement counterparts from seven other European countries during 17 joint human trafficking investigations.

There were continued reports of trafficking-related complicity of government officials during the reporting period. In 2009, two municipal councilors in Varna pleaded guilty to organized human trafficking, including forced prostitution following their arrest in the fall of 2008; one official was sentenced to one year of imprisonment and one official was sentenced to three years’ imprisonment. A third municipal councilor arrested in the same 2008 case did not plead guilty and his trial was ongoing at the time of this report. In a separate case, nine police officers of a local anti-organized crime unit in Vratsa were dismissed from office for assisting a trafficking group, although none of these officials were prosecuted for complicity in human trafficking. As reported in the 2009 Report, the government also investigated one police officer for complicity in trafficking in 2008; however, the government did not demonstrate efforts to prosecute this official at the conclusion of this reporting period.

== Protection (2010) ==
The Government of Bulgaria sustained its overall victim assistance and protection efforts during the year, though it penalized two identified victims of trafficking for crimes committed as a direct result of being trafficked. In 2009, the government identified 289 victims of trafficking - including 44 children - and referred nearly all of them for assistance, compared with 250 victims identified in 2008. The majority of adult victims were assisted by privately funded NGOs, although both the national and local governments did provide limited in-kind assistance to six anti-trafficking NGOs. The local government in Varna operated an adult trafficking shelter in that city; six victims were assisted by this shelter in 2009. Approximately 100 victims were assisted by government-funded NGOs during the reporting period. The government continued to operate six child-crisis centers that provided rehabilitative, psychological, and medical assistance to identified child victims of trafficking, as well as other children in distress. In 2009, 44 children were provided with government-funded assistance, a significant increase from 25 child trafficking victims assisted in government shelters in 2008. All victims in Bulgaria were eligible for free medical and psychological care provided through public hospitals and NGOs. The government encouraged victims to assist in trafficking investigations and prosecutions; victims who chose to cooperate with law enforcement were provided with full residency and employment rights for the duration of the criminal proceedings; the government reported that no foreign victims requested temporary residency permits during the reporting period. The government permitted foreign victims who chose not to cooperate with trafficking investigations to stay in Bulgaria for one month and 10 days before they faced mandatory repatriation; in 2009, the government granted one such permit to stay for 10 days plus one month. The Ministry of Foreign Affairs provided training to its officials posted at its embassies regarding the identification and treatment of trafficking victims, including how to refer Bulgarian victims of trafficking found overseas to local NGOs for assistance. During the reporting period, the Bulgarian embassy in Spain identified and referred for assistance six Bulgarian victims of forced labor, including three children. In 2009, five victims participated in the police witness protection program, compared with seven in 2008. In 2009, the government convicted two trafficking victims and sentenced each to a six-month suspended sentence for illegal border crossing, an unlawful act committed as a direct result of their being trafficked.

== Prevention (2010) ==
The Bulgarian government demonstrated significant progress in its efforts to prevent trafficking during the reporting period. The local government in Varna, in partnership with an employment agency and the local university, organized a prevention campaign that educated students about forced labor titled “Where Are You Traveling?” The National Commission for Combating Trafficking in Human Beings provided information to more than 350 students about human trafficking and organized an essay and art contest for students to share and discuss their impressions of human trafficking; the Commission presented 50 awards for anti-trafficking illustrations and 30 awards for essays during this contest. The government also demonstrated efforts to reduce demand for commercial sex acts and to combat child sex tourism. For example, in 2009, the government convicted one foreigner for traveling to Varna to have sex with children and sentenced him to 66 months’ imprisonment; one Bulgarian national was also convicted and sentenced to nine months’ imprisonment for procuring the children. During the reporting period, 14 clients of children in prostitution were prosecuted and convicted and sentenced to up to three years’ imprisonment.

After putting forth increased efforts against human trafficking, Bulgaria was upgraded by the US Department of State to the positive Tier 2 list in 2018 after three consecutive years in the unsatisfactory Tier 2 watch list.

== See also ==
- Human rights in Bulgaria
- Human trafficking in Europe
