= Human trafficking in the Netherlands =

Human trafficking in the Netherlands is a widely recognized problem.

The Netherlands ratified the 2000 UN TIP Protocol in July 2005.

According to the United States Department of State, human trafficking in the Netherlands is a problem which affects particularly women and girls, who are forced to work in the sex industry. In the year of 2009 there were 909 registered victims of human trafficking.

According to the U.S. Department of State, in 2010 the Netherlands was both a source and destination country for men, women, and children subjected to trafficking in persons, specifically forced prostitution and forced labor, though, to a lesser extent, it is a transit country for such trafficking. According to the US Department of State, the top five countries of origin for victims were the Netherlands, China, Nigeria, Hungary, and Sierra Leone.

The U.S. State Department's Office to Monitor and Combat Trafficking in Persons placed the country in "Tier 1" in 2017 and 2023.

In 2017, it was estimated by the Dutch National Rapporteur on Trafficking in Human Beings and Sexual Violence against Children that more than 6,000 people in the Netherlands fall victim to human trafficking each year. Two thirds of the people trafficked, about 4,000 people per year, fall victim to sexual slavery and abuse. This group consisted largely of Dutch women, including minors (1,320 girls each year) who were preyed upon by so-called "loverboys". The other 2,000 victims of human trafficking were largely foreigners who were put to work by organized crime groups.

From 2018 to 2022, the Netherlands identified 4732 victims of human trafficking (an average of almost 24 people per week); 20% were Dutch, 10% were children and 60% were female.

== See also ==
- Human rights in the Netherlands#Human trafficking
