= Not My Life =

2011 film by Robert Bilheimer

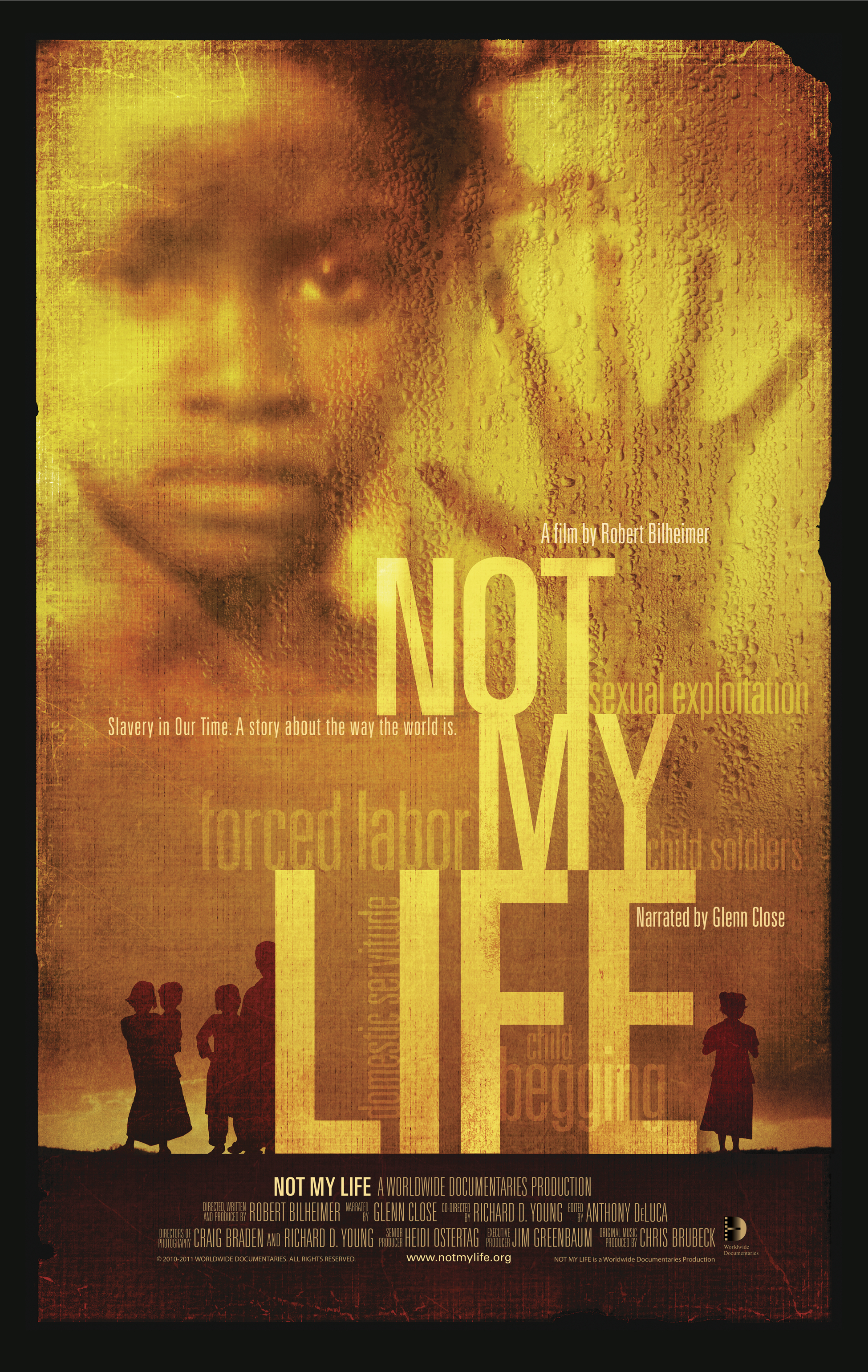
- Directed by: Robert Bilheimer; Richard Young
- Written by: Robert Bilheimer
- Produced by: Robert Bilheimer; Heidi Ostertag; Jim Greenbaum; Amy Detweiler; Devon Higby; Johan Weijers
- Narrated by: Glenn Close
- Cinematography: Richard Young; Craig Braden; Gerardo Puglia
- Edited by: Anthony DeLuca; JD Marlow
- Music by: Chris Brubeck; Dave Brubeck; Susan Tedeschi; Derek Trucks
- Distributed by: Worldwide Documentaries
- Release date: November 1, 2011 (United States)
- Running time: 83 minutes (2011 version); 56 minutes (2014 version)
- Country: United States
- Language: English

Not My Life is a 2011 American independent documentary film about human trafficking and contemporary slavery. The film was written, produced, and directed by Robert Bilheimer, who had been asked to make the film by Antonio Maria Costa, executive director of the United Nations Office on Drugs and Crime. Bilheimer planned Not My Life as the second installment in a trilogy, the first being A Closer Walk and the third being the unproduced Take Me Home. The title Not My Life came from a June 2009 interview with Molly Melching, founder of Tostan, who said that many people deny the reality of contemporary slavery because it is an uncomfortable truth, saying, "No, this is not my life."

Filming of Not My Life took four years to complete, and documented human trafficking in 13 countries: Albania, Brazil, Cambodia, Egypt, Ghana, Guatemala, India, Italy, Nepal, Romania, Senegal, Uganda, and the United States. The first and last scenes of the film take place in Ghana, and show children who are forced to fish in Lake Volta for 14 hours a day. The film also depicts sex trafficking victims, some of whom are only five or six years old.

Fifty people are interviewed in the film, including investigative journalist Paul Radu of Bucharest, Katherine Chon of the Polaris Project, and Iana Matei of Reaching Out Romania. Don Brewster of Agape International Missions says that all of the girls they have rescued from child sex tourism in Cambodia identify Americans as the clients who were the most abusive to them. The film was dedicated to Richard Young, its cinematographer and co-director, after he died in December 2010. It had its premiere the following month at the Lincoln Center for the Performing Arts in New York City. The narration was completely rerecorded in 2011, replacing Ashley Judd's voice with that of Glenn Close. The version of the film that was aired by CNN International as part of the CNN Freedom Project was shorter than the version shown at the premiere. In 2014, a re-edited version of the film was released.

Not My Life addresses many forms of slavery, including the military use of children in Uganda, involuntary servitude in the United States, forced begging and garbage picking in India, sex trafficking in Europe and Southeast Asia, and other kinds of child abuse. The film also focuses on the people and organizations engaged in working against human trafficking. The film asserts that most victims of human trafficking are children. Actress Lucy Liu said that people who watch Not My Life "will be shocked to find [human trafficking] is happening in America." Lucy Popescu of CineVue criticized the film for focusing on the victims, arguing that the perpetrators of trafficking should have been dealt with more prominently. Not My Life was named Best World Documentary at the Harlem International Film Festival in September 2012.

== Themes ==
Not My Life is a documentary film about human trafficking and contemporary slavery. It addresses many forms of slavery, including the military use of children in Uganda, involuntary servitude in the United States, unfree labor in Ghana, forced begging and garbage picking in India, sex trafficking in Europe and Southeast Asia, and other kinds of child abuse. The focus of the film is on trafficking victims, especially women and children, the latter of whom are often betrayed by adults that they trust. The film also focuses on the people and organizations engaged in working against human trafficking, including members of the Federal Bureau of Investigation (FBI), Free the Slaves, Girls Educational and Mentoring Services (GEMS), International Justice Mission (IJM), the Somaly Mam Foundation, Terre des hommes, Tostan, UNICEF, United Nations Office on Drugs and Crime (UNODC), and the United States Department of State (US DoS). Not My Life has been called "a cautionary tale". It depicts the commodification of millions of people and identifies the practices of traffickers as undermining international economics, security, sustainability and health.

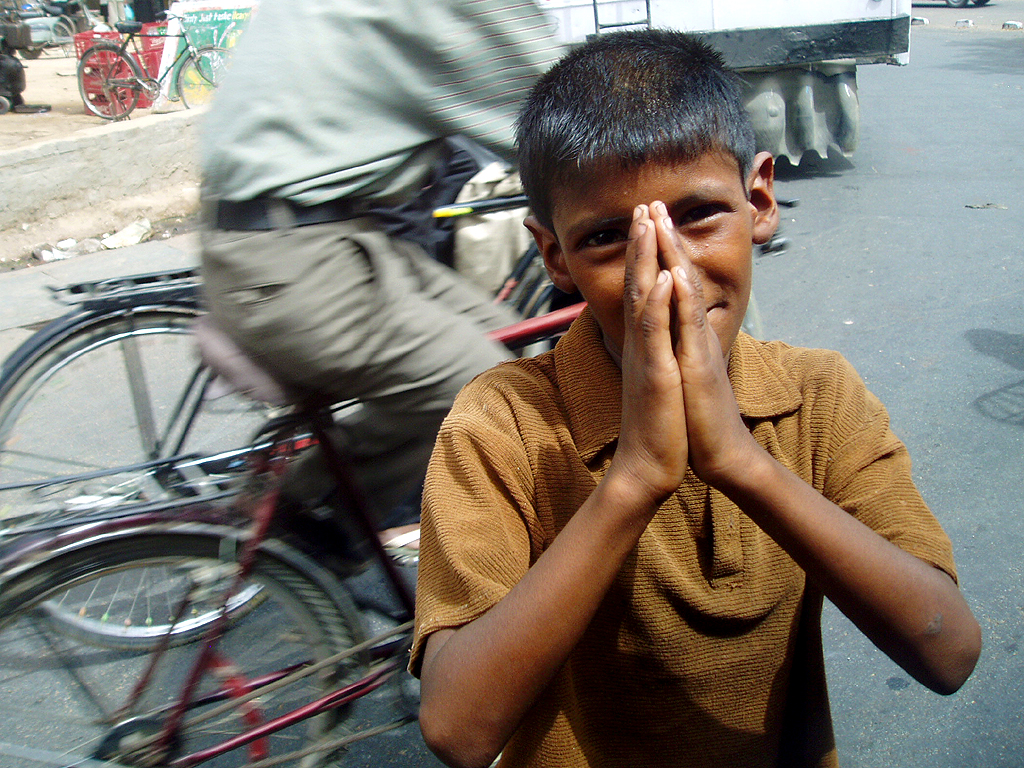
A boy begging in India. Not My Life depicts many different kinds of contemporary slavery, including forced child begging.

Not My Life calls attention to the fact that, in the United States, the sentencing for human trafficking is less severe than for drug trafficking. The film indicates a relationship between contemporary slavery and globalization. It asserts that most human trafficking victims are children, although the filmmakers have recognized the fact that millions of adults are also trafficked. The film depicts human trafficking as a matter of good and evil, provides interviews with survivors of human trafficking, and presents analysis from anti-trafficking advocates. Throughout the film, Robert Bilheimer encourages viewers to personally combat human trafficking. Bilheimer was sparing in his use of statistics in the film, feeling that overloading viewers with figures might numb them to the issues.

According to Nancy Keefe Rhodes of Stone Canoe, a U.S. literary journal, the film's audiences are likely to have the preconception that human trafficking is not slavery in the same sense that the Atlantic slave trade was, and many people believe that slavery was abolished a long time ago with such instruments as the U.S. Emancipation Proclamation and Thirteenth Amendment. Rhodes writes that society now uses the word "slavery" in modern contexts only as a metaphor, so that references to actual contemporary slavery can be dismissed as hyperbole, and she describes the film's goal as to "reclaim the original term [slavery] and convince us that what is happening now is what happened then: highly organized and pervasive, intentional, highly profitable and ... fully as coercive and wantonly cruel." Rhodes says that the word "slavery" has started to be used in its original sense again in recent years, but that audiences' views on contemporary slavery are nonetheless influenced by the slave-like imagery in such films as Hustle & Flow (2005) and Black Snake Moan (2007). The Academy Award-winning Hustle & Flow portrays a pimp as the hero, while Black Snake Moan features Christina Ricci as a young nymphomaniac; the marketing for Black Snake Moan centered on evocative, sexualized slave imagery, including a scantily-clad Ricci in chains. According to Rhodes, Bilheimer "rescue[s] modern slaves from representation as exotic creatures, to restore their humanity" and allow audiences to relate to them. For this purpose, Bilheimer tells stories of individuals in the context of their communities and families. While Bilheimer had previously done extensive social justice work with religious organizations, he did not proselytize in the film, despite the many opportunities the film afforded him to do so. (Note: Bilheimer has a long history of work with faith-based projects, and his father, Robert S. Bilheimer, was the member of the World Council of Churches (WCC) who initiated the Cottesloe Consultation, which saw the WCC meet with South African church representatives to challenge the religious basis that had been put in place to justify apartheid.)

== Contents ==
Fifty people are interviewed in Not My Life, including Katherine Chon of the Polaris Project, investigative journalist Paul Radu of Bucharest, Vincent Tournecuillert of Terre des hommes, Iana Matei of Reaching Out Romania, UNICEF Director of Programmes Nicholas Alipui, Susan Bissell of UNICEF's Child Protection Section, Antonio Maria Costa of UNODC, Somaly Mam of the Somaly Mam Foundation, Molly Melching of Tostan in Senegal, and Suzanne Mubarak, who was First Lady of Egypt at the time. The sex trafficking victims shown in the film include children as young as five and six years old.

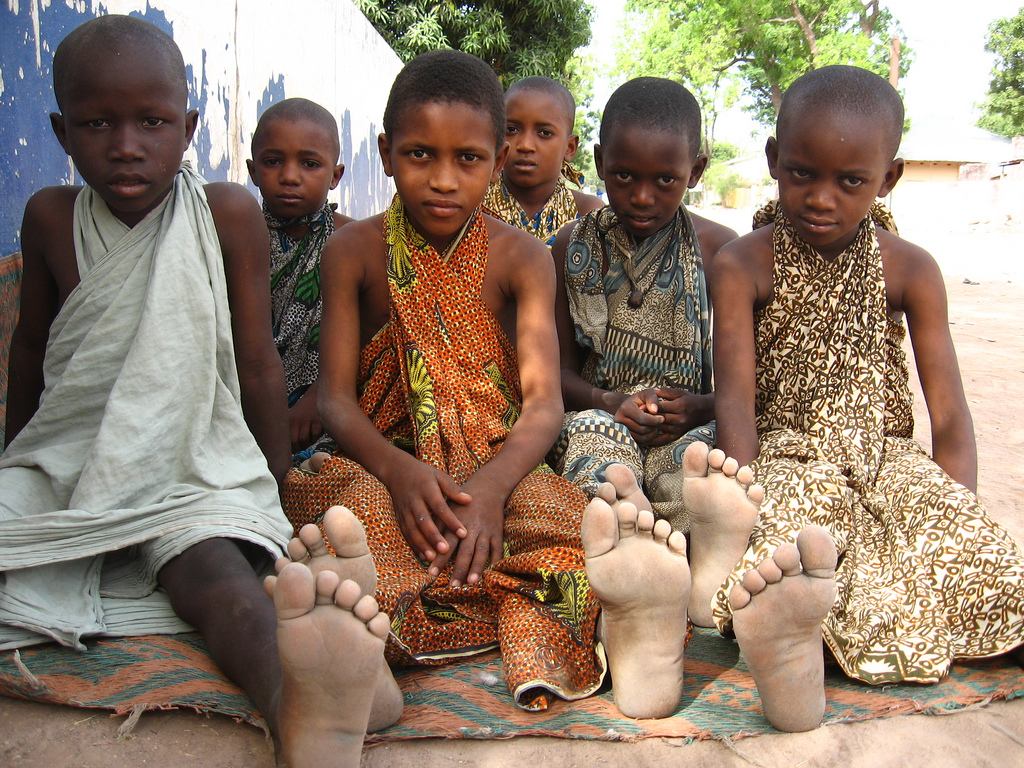
Talibes, Quranic schoolboys, in Senegal. Not My Life documents forced child begging in Senegal, where around 50,000 talibes beg on the streets under the threat of being beaten if they do not meet set quotas.

Not My Life begins with a black screen on which the words "Human trafficking is slavery" appear in white. A sequence filmed in Ghana follows, showing children who are forced to fish in Lake Volta for 14 hours a day. Many of the children die as a result of the working conditions. A 10-year-old boy swims through the murky water towards the camera, looking into it, and holds his breath underwater while trying to unsnarl a fishing net. Next, Senegalese talibes, Muslim boys who attend Quranic schools, appear. There are approximately 50,000 talibes in Senegal who are forced to beg on the streets to make money for their teachers; children who do not meet their quotas are beaten. Many of these children suffer from skin and stomach diseases because of their diet of spoiled food—one demonstrates his diseased hands to the camera, only for an adult to pull him away by the ear. The film then moves to India and depicts children, mostly wearing flip-flops, illegally sorting through hazardous waste in Ghazipur and New Delhi landfills. Romani families are shown in Central and Eastern Europe, and the narration indicates that Romani boys are often trafficked for the purpose of forced child begging, and that Romani girls are regularly trafficked as child prostitutes. The narrator says that the profits of human trafficking "are built on the backs and in the beds of our planet's youth."

In Zoha Prison in Romania, there are interviews with traffickers serving prison sentences that the film suggested were too short in light of the severity of the crime of human trafficking. The typical sentence for this crime is six or seven years, while the sentence for trafficking in drugs is normally twenty years. Two Romanian traffickers, Traian and Ovidiu, attest to having starved, punched, and kicked the girls they trafficked. Ovidiu recounts a story, in an interview filmed in February 2007, about kidnapping a prostitute and selling her for sex when he was 14. He expresses no remorse for these actions. The sentences served by Traian and Ovidiu were short enough that, by the time the film was released, they were no longer in prison. Ana, a girl they trafficked, is also interviewed in the film, saying that she lost a tooth in one of her beatings. She describes being pregnant at the time, but not telling this to her captors because of fears for the unborn child's safety.

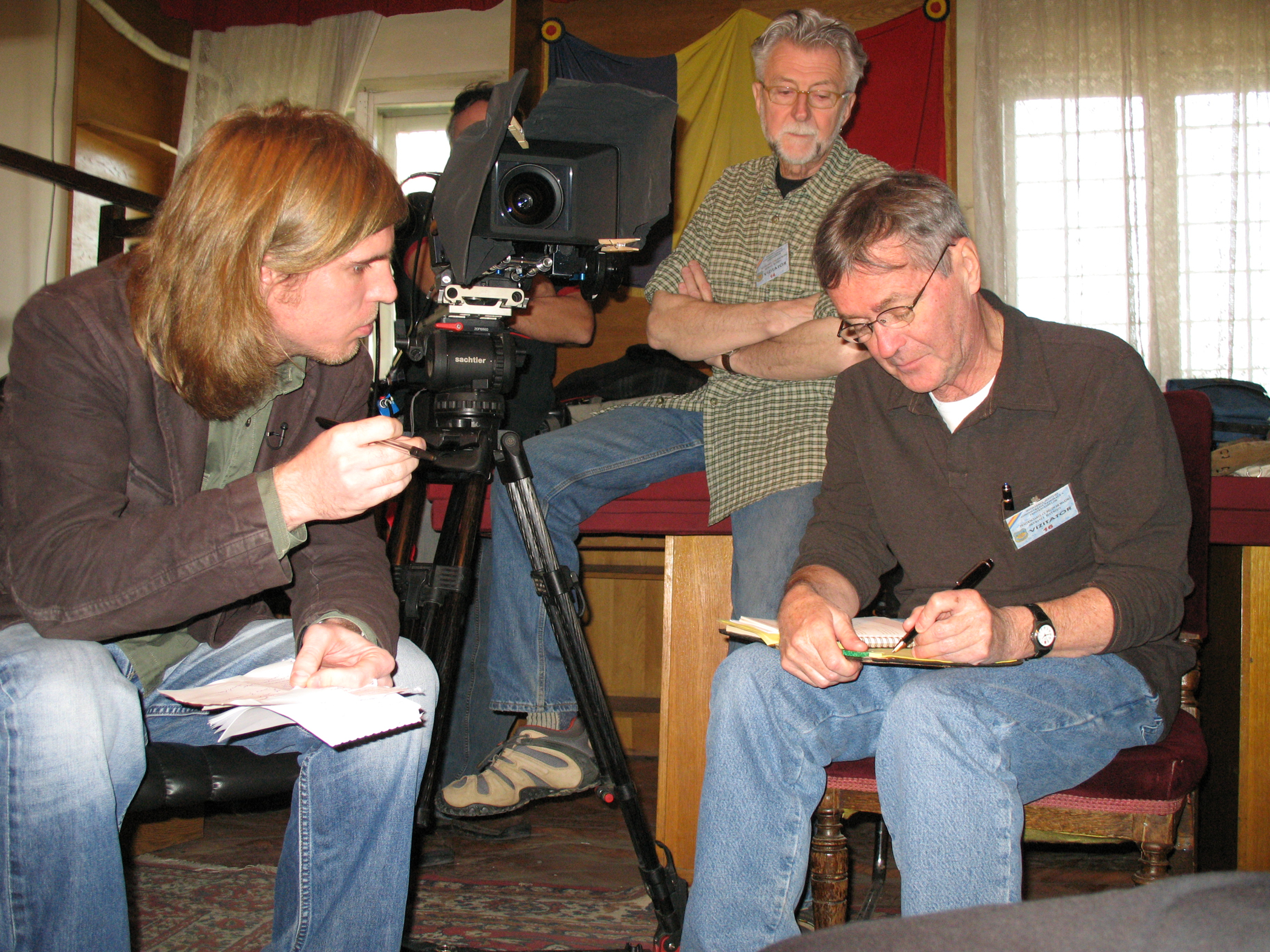
Romanian investigative journalist Paul Radu (left) being interviewed by Richard Young (center) and Robert Bilheimer (right). Radu is one of fifty people interviewed in Not My Life.

Radu is interviewed in this portion of the film, as is Tournecuillert, who speaks about his experiences in Albania, where he heard about the sex trafficking of girls and how some of the girls would be shot or burned to death as a warning to the other girls. He describes how Albanian girls are often rounded up to be sexually trafficked in Italy. He further explains that, normally, before they leave Albania, the traffickers kill one of the girls in front of the others—usually by burning or shooting—to demonstrate what will happen to others who try to escape. Matei adds that, for the sake of amusement, some of the girls would be buried alive with only their heads remaining above ground. Eugenia Bonetti, a nun, speaks about her work helping girls escape from slavery in Italy.

Another interview is with a Wichita, Kansas woman named Angie who was prostituted with another girl, Melissa, in the American Midwest when they were teenagers. Angie recounts how they were expected to have sex with truck drivers and steal their money. She describes an incident when, after Melissa found pictures of a man's grandchildren in his wallet, they realized he was old enough to be their own grandfather. "I wanted to die," she says, close to tears. Outside the film, Bilheimer said that Angie's trafficker expected her to engage in forty sex acts a night, and threatened to kill her if she refused. "It's not just truck drivers," FBI agent Mike Beaver says. "We're seeing them purchased and abused by both white collar and blue collar individuals." This statement segues into a Washington, D.C., scene wherein two girls in their early teens are shown by a curb on K Street, changing into prostitutes' attire.

Angie was rescued during Operation Stormy Nights, an anti-human-trafficking operation carried out by the FBI, in 2004. Bilheimer said that, while there is no way of being certain how many girls like Angie are being sexually trafficked in the U.S., "diligent people out there have arrived at a bare minimum figure of ... one hundred thousand girls, eight to fifteen [performing] ten sex acts a day" adding up to "a billion unpunished crimes of sexual violence on an annual basis."

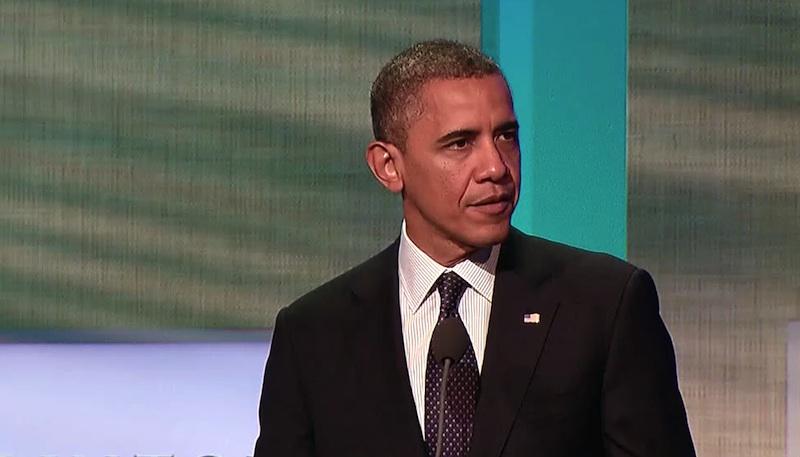
U.S. President Barack Obama, telling the story of American sex trafficking victim Sheila White during a speech to the Clinton Global Initiative. White is interviewed in Not My Life.

Another American victim of sexual trafficking, Sheila White, describes an incident in 2003 when she was beaten up next to the Port Authority of New York and New Jersey. She says that nobody even asked her if she needed help. White eventually escaped from being trafficked and went on to work with GEMS to raise awareness on the issue in New York. In 2012, after the film was released, Barack Obama, President of the United States, recognized White's work and told her story during a speech to the Clinton Global Initiative.

The next scenes in the film depict child labour in Nepal, and indicate that child workers in the textile industry are commonly targeted by sex traffickers. A brothel raid in India, led by Balkrishna Acharya of the Rescue Foundation in Mumbai, is then shown. Ten young girls are rescued from a four-by-three-foot closet and a crawl space. The madam reacts furiously, perceiving the raid as taking away her livelihood. Then, the trafficking of children into the sex industry is depicted in Cambodia. Some scenes take place in Svay Pak, Phnom Penh, one of the cheapest sex tourism destinations in the Mekong Delta. Women of the Somaly Mam Foundation are depicted working with girls who have been sexually trafficked. A large number of these girls are pictured one by one, each child fading into the next against the backdrop of a doorway. An interview with one of the Somaly Mam Foundation workers, Sophea Chhun, reveals that her daughter, Sokny, was kidnapped in 2008 at age 23. "Most likely Sokny too was sold," Chhun says, claiming that "the police treated it like she wasn't important"—perhaps, she suggests, because Sokny was an adopted child. Don Brewster of Agape International Missions is interviewed, and says that all of the girls they have rescued from child sex tourism in Cambodia identify Americans as the clients who were the most abusive to them. Bilheimer agreed with this assertion in an interview outside the film.

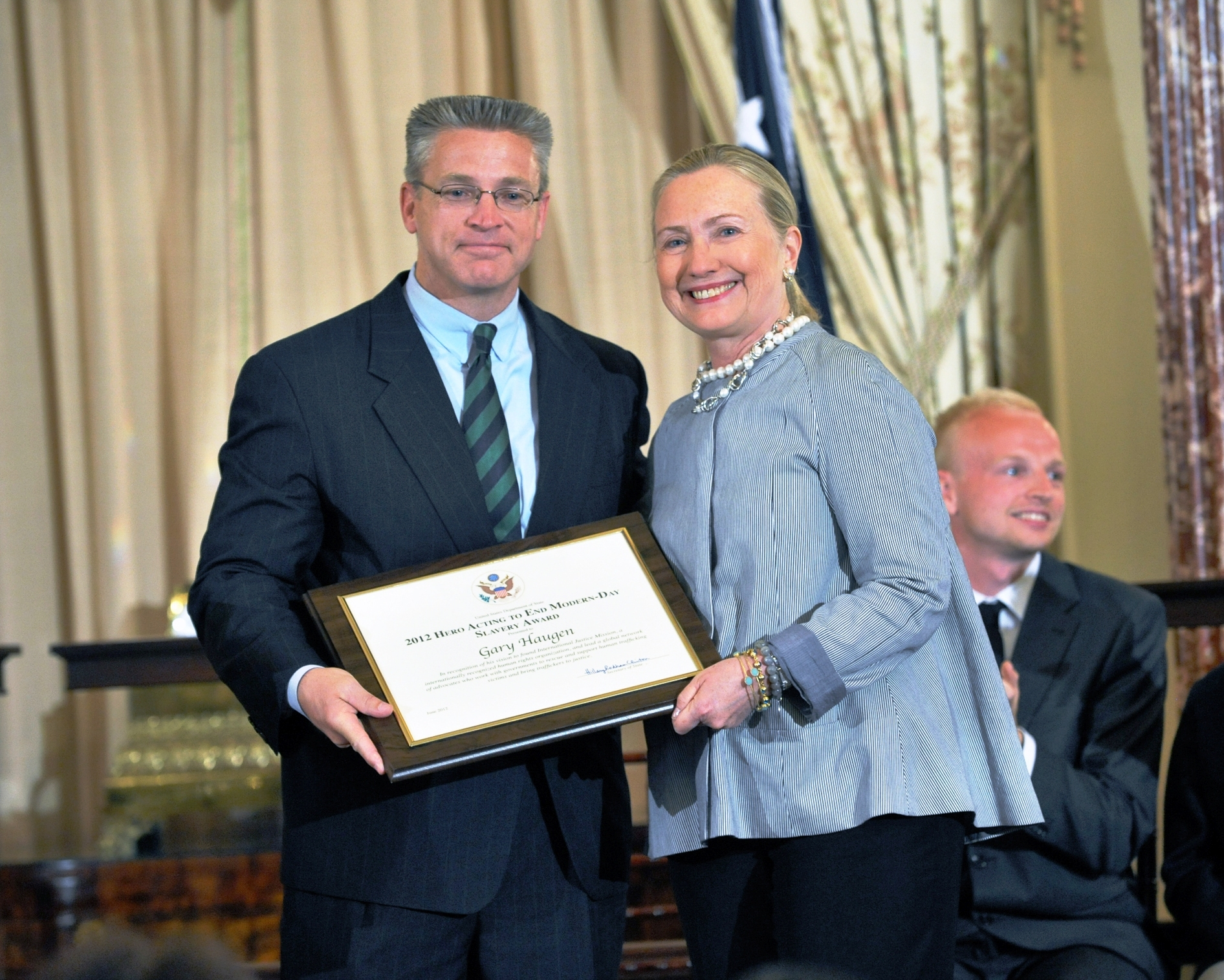
Gary Haugen (left), president of International Justice Mission, receiving an award from Hillary Clinton recognizing him as a Trafficking in Persons (TIP) Hero. Haugen appears in Not My Life.

In Guatemala City, Guatemalan trafficker Efrain Ortiz is shown being arrested, and the film indicates that he was later given a prison sentence of 95 years. Ortiz had two sons he had been using for waste collection and five daughters he had been committing incest with. Bilheimer accompanies IJM representatives Pablo Villeda, Amy Roth, and Gary Haugen as they and the local police arrest Ortiz; he is charged with exploitation of children and violence against women. Ortiz looks surprised as he is handcuffed. Haugen, President of IJM, went on to be named a Trafficking in Persons (TIP) Hero in the 2012 US DoS TIP Report.

Grace Akallo, a Ugandan woman who was once abducted by Joseph Kony to be used as a child soldier in the Lord's Resistance Army (LRA), is interviewed, saying that "this kind of evil must be stopped." She was forced to kill another girl as part of her initiation into the LRA, a very common practice among armies that employ child soldiers. The film states that she was ultimately rehabilitated and became a mother.

Bishop Desmond Tutu, who Bilheimer had previously interviewed for The Cry of Reason, appears towards the end of the film, saying, "Each of us has the capacity to be a saint." Bilheimer included Tutu in Not My Life because he felt that audiences might be in need of pastoral counseling after watching the film. The final scene of Not My Life returns to the boy holding his breath underwater in Ghana. His name is revealed to be Etse, and it is stated that he and six other trafficking victims shown in the film have been rescued. Some of the last words in the film are spoken by Brazilian human rights advocate Leo Sakomoto: "I can't see a good life while there are people living like animals. Not because I'm a good person, not because it's my duty, but because they are human—like me."

== Production ==
=== Background ===
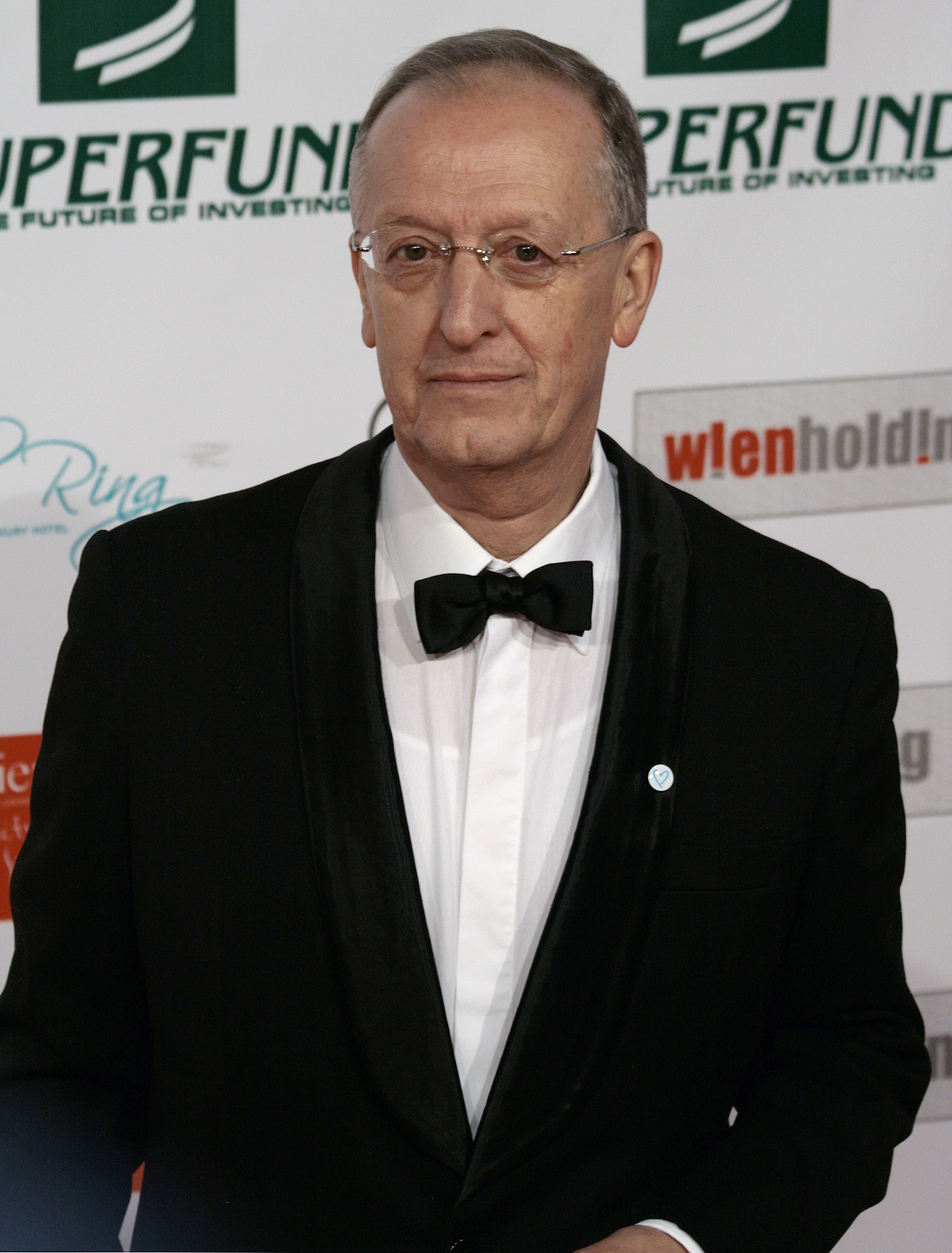
Antonio Maria Costa, executive director of the United Nations Office on Drugs and Crime, asked Robert Bilheimer to make Not My Life.

The project that became Not My Life was initiated by the executive director of the UNODC, Antonio Maria Costa, who wanted to commission a film that would "bring the issue of modern slavery to the attention of public opinion, globally—especially the well-meaning, law-abiding and God-fearing people who do not believe something so horrible is happening in their own neighborhood." With this goal in mind, Costa approached Worldwide Documentaries, an East Bloomfield, New York-based organization that had produced two films with which he was familiar: The Cry of Reason, which documents internal resistance to South African apartheid by way of Beyers Naudé's story; and A Closer Walk, which is about the epidemiology of HIV/AIDS. Costa e-mailed Bilheimer, Director of Worldwide Documentaries, asking him to create the film he envisioned. Costa said that he choose Bilheimer because the director had developed a "solid reputation [for] addressing difficult topics... combining artistic talent, a philosophical view about development and a humanitarian sentiment about what to do about the issues."

Bilheimer accepted Costa's proposition, and subsequently wrote, produced, and directed Not My Life as an independent film. Bilheimer, who had received an Academy Award nomination for The Cry of Reason, said that "the unrelenting, unpunished, and craven exploitation of millions of human beings for labor, sex, and hundreds of sub-categories thereof is simply the most appalling and damaging expression of so-called human civilization we have ever seen." Bilheimer's wife, Heidi Ostertag, is Worldwide Documentaries' Senior Producer, and she co-produced Not My Life with him. She said that she found making a film about human trafficking difficult because "people do not want to talk about this issue." Bilheimer found that the connections he had made during the production of A Closer Walk were also useful when producing Not My Life because the poor and the outcast are at the greatest risk of both HIV/AIDS and human trafficking; there is, for this reason, much overlap between the groups victimized by these two afflictions. Bilheimer attempted to fashion the film in such a way that every part of it would illustrate a statement made by Abraham Lincoln: "If slavery is not wrong, nothing is wrong."

When making this film, Bilheimer held that a contemporary abolitionist movement did not yet exist. He described his purpose in creating the film as to raise awareness and initiate such a movement. He also wished to communicate to his audiences that not all human trafficking is sexual. Traffickers "commit unspeakable, wanton acts of violence against their fellow human beings," he said, "and are rarely punished for their crimes." Production of Not My Life was supported by the United Nations Global Initiative to Fight Human Trafficking (UN.GIFT), UNICEF, and UNODC, providing Worldwide Documentaries with $1 million in funding secured by Costa.

=== Filming ===
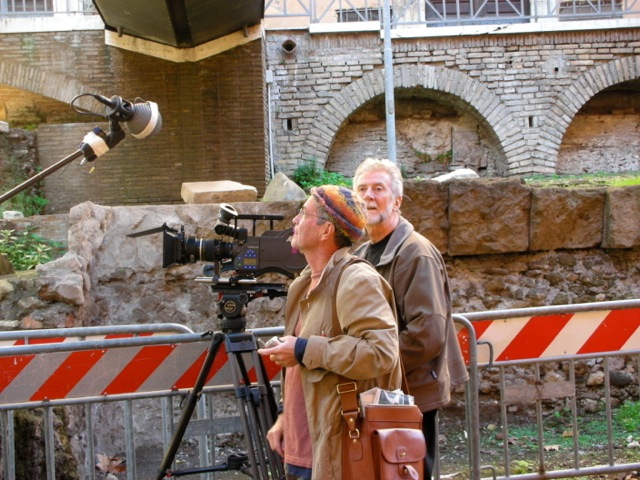
Bilheimer (left) and Young during filming in Italy, one of thirteen countries in which Not My Life was shot.

Bilheimer said that the level of cruelty he saw in shooting Not My Life was greater than anything he had seen when documenting apartheid in South Africa for The Cry of Reason. Bilheimer attested to becoming more aware of the global extent of human trafficking as he went about making Not My Life. The film's title came from a June 2009 interview with Molly Melching, founder of Tostan, an organization dedicated to human rights education operating in ten African countries. As Bilheimer and Melching spoke in Thiès, Senegal, discussing how people often deny the reality of contemporary slavery because it is an uncomfortable truth, Melching said, "People can say, 'No, this is not my life.' But my life can change. Let's change together."

Filming of Not My Life took place over four years in Africa, Asia, Europe, and North and South America documenting human trafficking in thirteen countries: Albania, Brazil, Cambodia, Egypt, Ghana, Guatemala, India, Italy, Nepal, Romania, Senegal, Uganda, and the United States. Shooting in Ghana took place over four 18-hour days, during which the film crew had to travel over washboard roads in Land Rovers and did not sleep. Filming in Svay Pak took place in March 2010, and shooting in Abusir, Egypt took place the following month.

In Guatemala, Bilheimer facilitated the arrest of trafficker Ortiz by renting a car for the police to use, in order to film the arrest as part of Not My Life. Bilheimer said that, during the making of the film, he and his crew were surprised to discover that traffickers employ similar methods of intimidation across the globe, "almost as if there were ... unwritten bylaws and tactics ... The lies are the same."

=== Editing ===
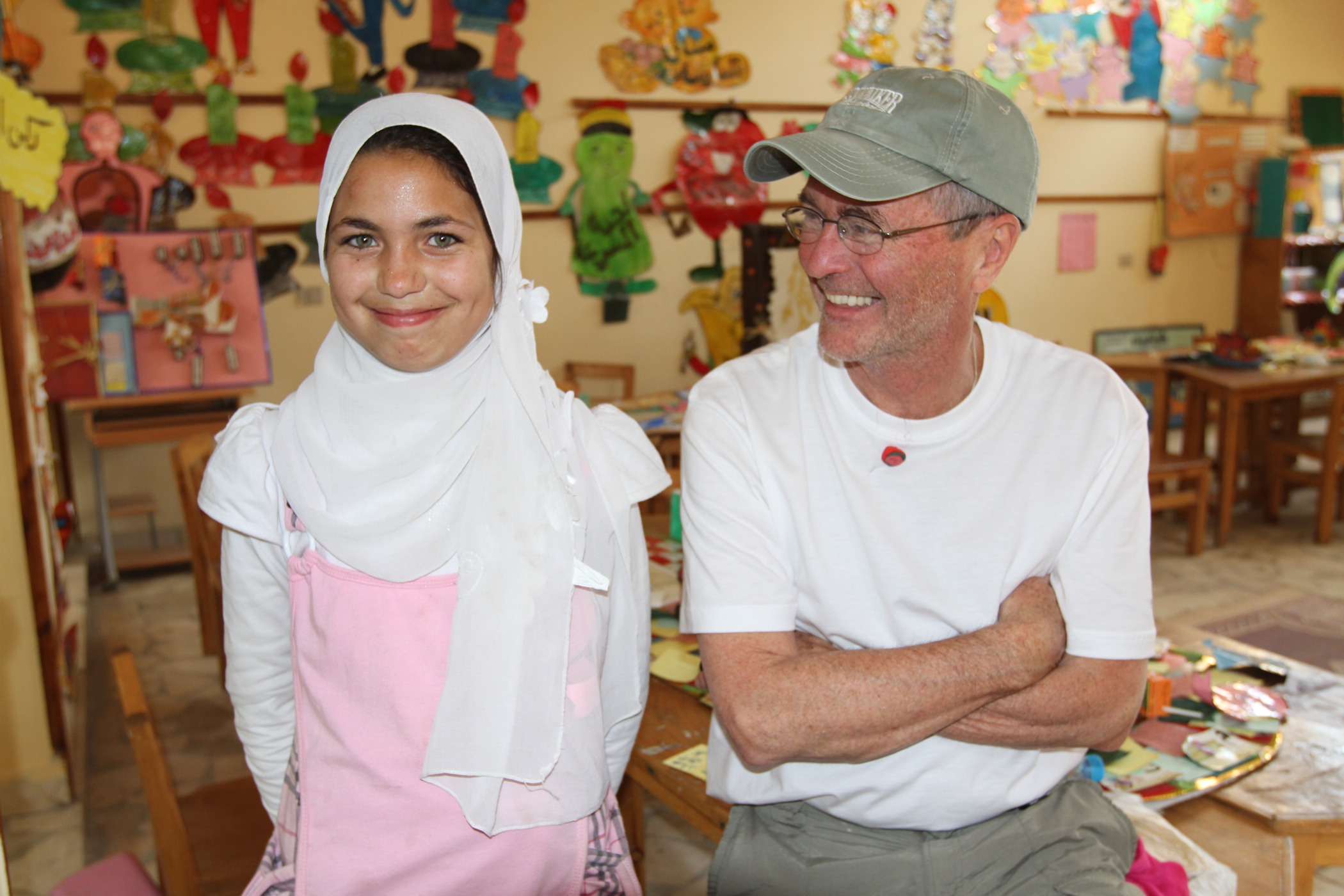
Bilheimer with a student at a mixed-sex school in Egypt. Bilheimer removed much of the related content from the film after the Arab Spring made the information outdated.

Susan Tedeschi, Derek Trucks, and Dave Brubeck performed the theme song for Not My Life, Bob Dylan's "Lord Protect My Child", which was produced by Chris Brubeck. After the initial screenings in early 2011, the film went through a series of revisions, taking into account information gathered from more than thirty screenings for focus groups. Later that year, the narration was completely rerecorded; Bilheimer replaced Ashley Judd's voice with that of Glenn Close, who had previously worked with him on A Closer Walk. The version of the film that was aired by CNN International was shorter than the version shown at the premiere. An even shorter version, only 30 minutes long, was created with school audiences in mind.

Content relating to the Egyptian mixed-sex schools instituted by Suzanne Mubarak was gathered, but Bilheimer eventually removed much of this content from the film because the Arab Spring made the information in this portion of the film outdated, despite the continued existence of most of these schools. Much of the interview with Molly Melching was removed as well. During the editing of Not My Life, Bilheimer cut the interview with Tutu, but later re-added a single quotation. In this interview, Bilheimer told Tutu about meeting normally reasonable, compassionate women who, when speaking about human traffickers, say things like "Hang him up by his balls and then cut 'em off!" Tutu, head of the truth and reconciliation commission, surprised Bilheimer with his response, saying that "these people have committed monstrous acts," but that, according to Christianity, traffickers can still be redeemed and become saints.

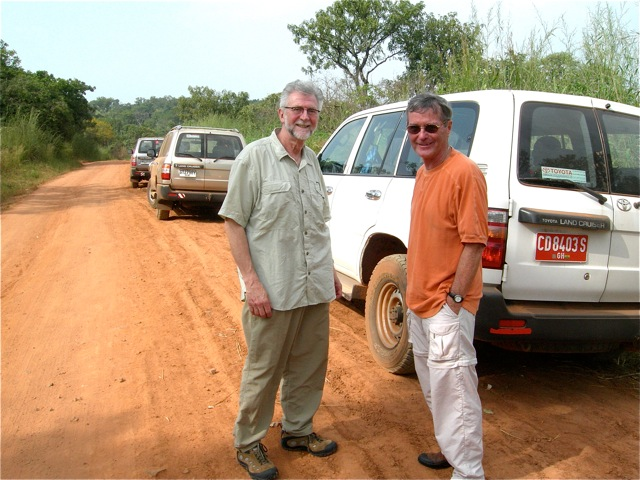
Bilheimer (right) and Young (left), the film's cinematographer, during shooting in Ghana. Young died before the premiere, and the film was dedicated to him.

As had occurred with Bilheimer's previous film, A Closer Walk, Not My Life had several preview screenings before its official release. The United States Agency for International Development (USAID) hosted a preview screening at the Willard InterContinental Washington in September 2009 as part of a day-long symposium on human trafficking. A preview screening in Egypt, including the material shot in that country that was later removed, took place in December 2010 at the International Forum against Human Trafficking in Luxor.

Later that month, on December 15, the film's cinematographer and co-director Richard Young died. Not My Life was subsequently dedicated to him. Bilheimer said that Young had believed in the film far more than he himself had.

== Release ==
The film had its official premiere in Alice Tully Hall at the Lincoln Center for the Performing Arts in New York City on January 19, 2011. Melanne Verveer, United States Ambassador-at-Large for Global Women's Issues, gave a speech, saying, "Each and every one of us is called to act. I hope that tonight each of us will make their own commitment." Additional screenings were held in Los Angeles and Chicago later that month. That October, Not My Life had its international premiere in London. CNN International aired the film in two parts a few days later as part of the CNN Freedom Project. The Swedish premiere was attended by Crown Princess Victoria. Bilheimer recognized that people combatting human trafficking are in need of resources, so he considered various options with respect to the intellectual property of Not My Life, ultimately deciding to release the film at charge in addition to selling licenses for unlimited private screenings. On November 1, an 83-minute version of the film was released on DVD by Worldwide Documentaries, which also began digitally distributing the film and selling the unlimited licenses. LexisNexis, the governments of Arizona and Minnesota, and the U.S. Fund for UNICEF all purchased licenses. The latter organization planned to use the film as part of an anti-human-trafficking campaign.

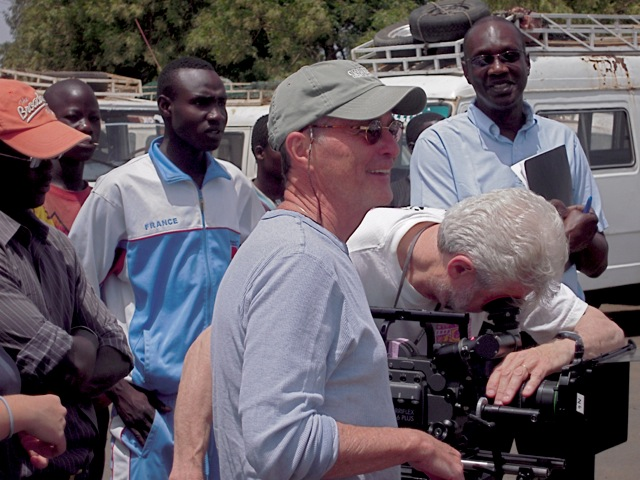
Bilheimer in Senegal, during filming. After finishing Not My Life, Bilheimer sought to use it to initiate a movement against human trafficking and contemporary slavery.

Not My Life was screened at the 2012 UNIS-UN Conference in New York City, the theme of which was human exploitation. Segments from the film were included in "Can You Walk Away?", a 2012 exhibition on contemporary slavery at President Lincoln's Cottage at the Soldiers' Home in Washington, DC. A hotel chain presented the film to its staff in London in preparation for the 2012 Summer Olympics to raise awareness about the types of human trafficking that might take place in conjunction with the events. Bilheimer initiated an Indiegogo crowdfunding campaign in 2012 to allow local organizations opposing human trafficking to screen the film. That same year, he expressed a willingness to release fifteen-minute excerpts from the film to help its message reach more people.

In a 2012 interview, Bilheimer said that he considered A Closer Walk and Not My Life to be the first two installments in a trilogy; he intended to make an environmental film called Take Me Home as the third installment. As of 2013, however, the Worldwide Documentaries website stated that Bilheimer was considering different subjects for his next film, including poverty in the United States, the aftermath of the 2010 Haiti earthquake, and posttraumatic stress disorder among U.S. Army veterans of the wars in Iraq and Afghanistan. Bilheimer said in 2013 that Not My Life "is not a perfect film by any means, but it is having an impact." He said that he would like to be moving on to a new film project, but that he would continue promoting Not My Life because he thought it could help combat human trafficking.

Throughout 2013, the World Affairs Councils of America hosted Not My Life screenings in a variety of cities across the United States, funded by the Carlson Family Foundation. That same year, the Swedish International Development Cooperation Agency gave Worldwide Documentaries a grant to do anti-human trafficking work over a three-year period. Not My Life was screened at the Mexican film festival Oaxaca FilmFest in November 2012; BORDEReview in Warsaw, Poland, in May 2013; and the Pasadena International Film & New Media Festival in February 2014.

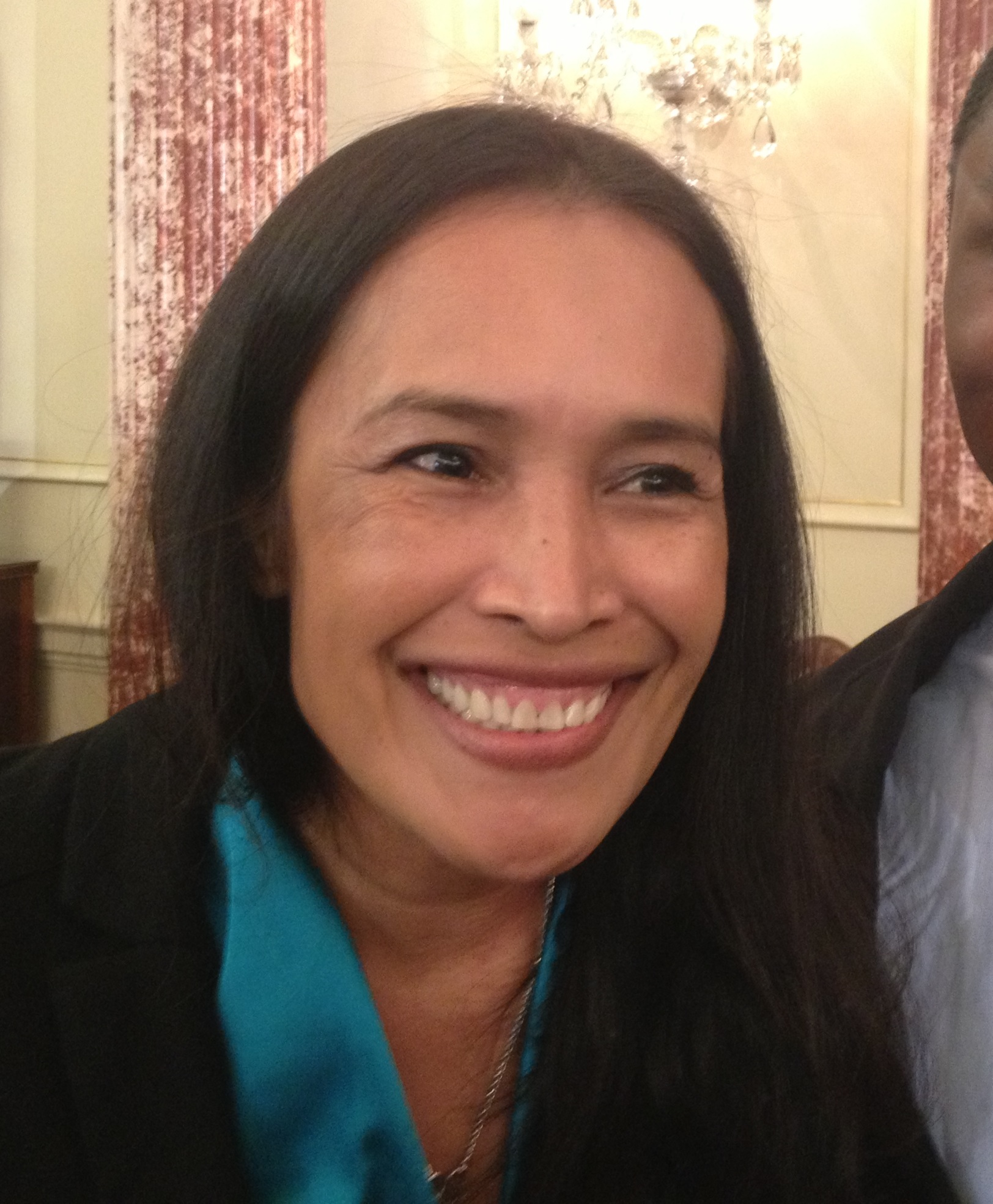
After Somaly Mam resigned from the Somaly Mam Foundation, Bilheimer re-edited Not My Life to remove her from the film.

In May 2014, the Somaly Mam Foundation released a statement that Somaly had resigned from her leadership of the organization as a result of investigations regarding allegations about her personal history. The following month, Bilheimer released a statement in response, saying that he had re-edited the film in order to remove the scenes depicting Somaly and that the new version would be available shortly. Bilheimer wrote that "the storytelling in the Cambodia segment of Not My Life remains intact and is still very moving, with an even sharper focus, now, on the girls themselves." In this statement, Bilheimer requested that people screening previous versions of the film tell their audiences that the presence of Somaly in the film is understandably a distraction, that the film is not primarily about Somaly but rather about the millions of children in slavery in the world, and that this focus is what is most important about the film.

For the 2014 re-release of the film, Bilheimer added new content relating to India, including an interview with Kailash Satyarthi, founder of the non-governmental organization Bachpan Bachao Andolan which opposes child labor. This content emphasizes that there are more human trafficking victims in India than in any other country in the world. The new version of the film, which was co-produced with the Delhi-based Riverbank Studios, is 56 minutes long and premiered at the India International Centre in New Delhi on June 26, 2014. Satyarthi was one of the panelists in a panel discussion accompanying the screening, as was Indian filmmaker Mike Pandey, who had managed Riverbank Studios' side of the co-production. The film was scheduled to air on Doordarshan (DD) in Hindi three days later. In July, Bilheimer called his continued work on the film "a labor of love" and said that "far too much silence still surrounds the issue" of human trafficking.

== Reception ==
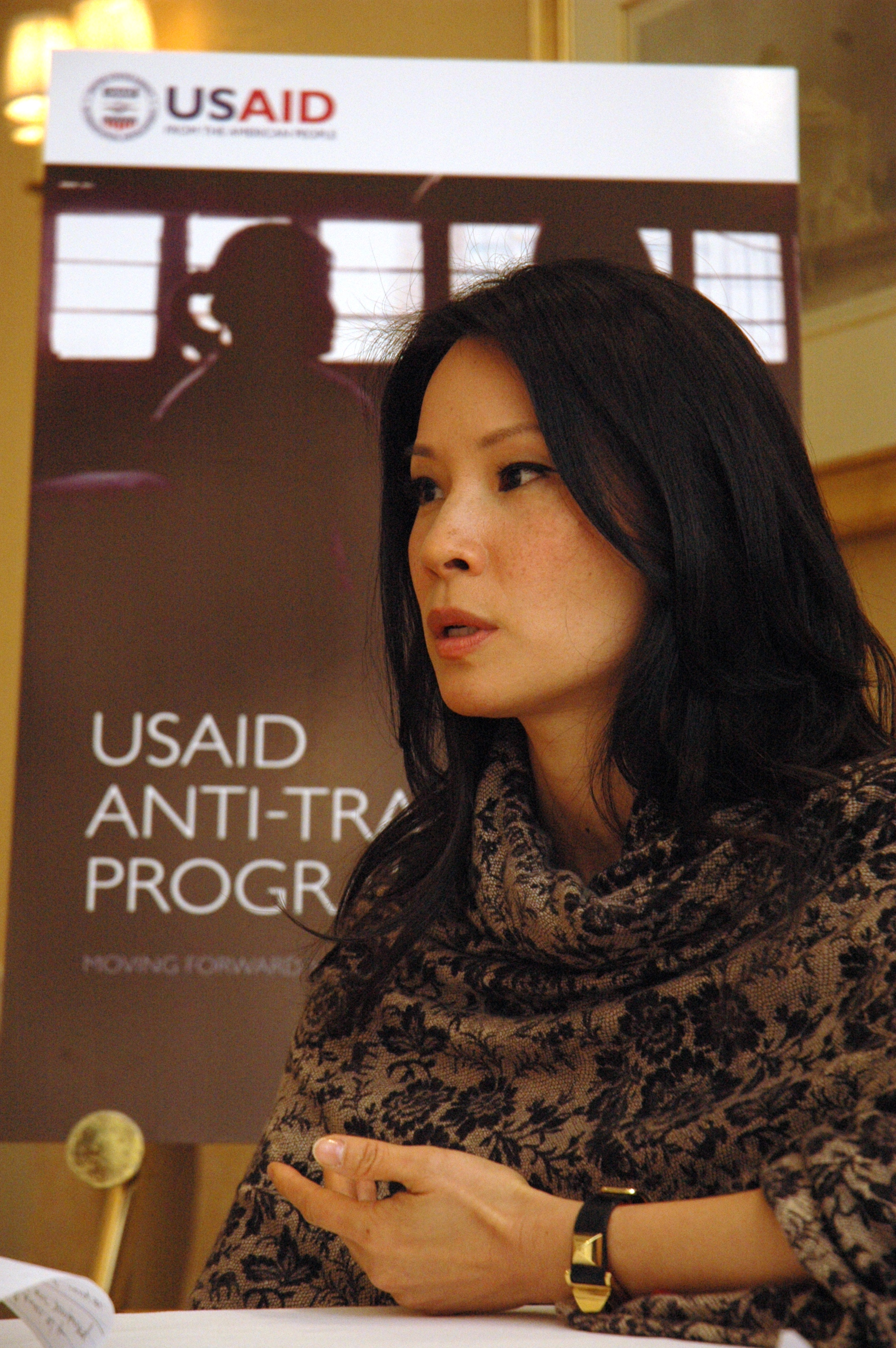
Actress Lucy Liu spoke at the United States Agency for International Development preview screening of Not My Life, saying that 80,000 women are victims of sexual assault every day.

At the USAID preview screening, actress Lucy Liu, who has worked with MTV EXIT and produced the documentary film Redlight, said that people who watch Not My Life "will be shocked to find [human trafficking] is happening in America"; she said that there were 80,000 women being sexually assaulted daily and she called human trafficking the "cannibalization of the planet's youth." According to UN.GIFT, before Not My Life, there was "no single communication tool that effectively depict[ed] the problem as a whole for a mass audience." Susan Bissell, UNICEF's Child Protection Section chief, agreed with this assertion, and said that the film "takes a close look at the underlying causality that so many other filmmakers have missed [and] it will change the way we see our lives, in some very fundamental ways." She also said that Not My Life is an important documentary because it brings attention to underreported forms of abuse. A reviewer from Medical News Today praised the film for "raising awareness and speaking about taboo subjects," arguing that these activities "are critical to empower families, communities, and governments to speak out honestly and take action against abuses."

Lucy Popescu of CineVue called the film "a powerful indictment of the global trade in human beings and the abuse of vulnerable people," but criticized the film for focusing on human trafficking victims, arguing that the perpetrators should have been dealt with more prominently. She commended Bilheimer on the few interviews with traffickers that he did include, but she condemned as inadequate the "only passing reference to the thousands of men who engage in sexual tourism, like those who travel to Cambodia to 'buy' traumatized children who they can then abuse for weeks at a time." Popescu also called the film "simplistic", arguing that it should have more clearly expressed that sex trafficking victims are not able to provide legitimate consent for sexual activity because they are afraid that their lives might be in danger if they do not comply. John Rash of the Star Tribune called the film "a cacophony of concerned voices speaking about a modern-day scourge." Rash praised the film for its global scope, but suggested that this geographical breadth allows American audiences to ignore the fact that the trafficking of children is prevalent in the United States and not just in other countries.

Not My Life was named Best World Documentary at the Harlem International Film Festival in September 2012. Nancy Keefe Rhodes of Stone Canoe called it a "highly-distilled ... remarkable film," describing Bilheimer as "committed to strong story-telling and film-as-craft." She commends Bilheimer on alternating between American sequences and scenes in other countries, allowing "the experiences of young women with whom an American audience may more readily identify [to] become one among many woven into the fabric of global trafficking." Tripurari Sharan, Director General of DD, said that his organization was pleased to air the film and hoped that doing so would bring about greater awareness across India about human trafficking in the country. He called the film "both an eye-opener and a profoundly moving call to action".

== Bibliography ==
- Rhodes, Nancy Keefe (2012). "Not My Life: Filmmaker Robert Bilheimer's Latest Meditation on Good and Evil" (PDF). Stone Canoe. Archived from the original (PDF) on October 26, 2014.
