= Richard Young (cinematographer) =

American cinematographer and film director

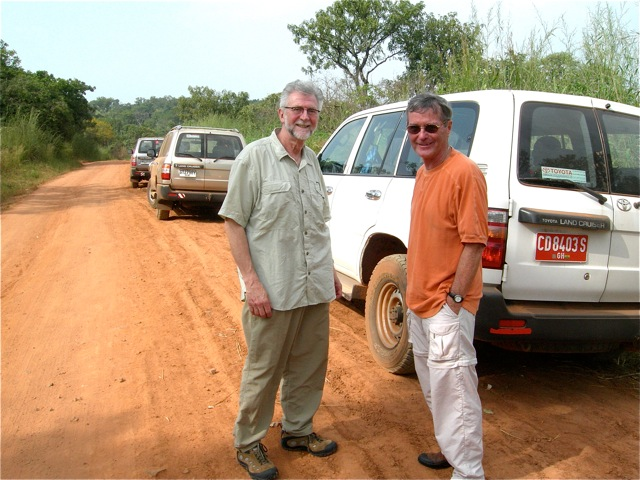
- Richard Young (left) and Robert Bilheimer (right) during the filming of Not My Life
- Born: October 17, 1939; Penfield, New York, United States
- Died: December 15, 2010 (aged 71)
- Occupations: Cinematographer; Film director
- Employer(s): Eastman Kodak; Worldwide Documentaries
- Notable work: I'm Still Here; Not My Life

Richard Young (October 17, 1939 – December 15, 2010) was a cinematographer and film director who was born in Penfield, New York, United States.

== Life and work ==
As a cinematographer, he filmed several dozen films for Eastman Kodak. He codirected the 1996 film I'm Still Here: The Truth About Schizophrenia with Robert Bilheimer. He was the director of the 1998 film Echoes from the Ancients. He codirected and coproduced the 1999 film A Warrior in Two Worlds: The Life of Ely Parker with Ann Spurling. He performed the cinematography for the 2003 documentary film A Closer Walk.

Young died on December 15, 2010. The film Not My Life, for which he had served as cinematographer and co-director, was subsequently dedicated to him. Bilheimer, who was the screenwriter, producer, and director of Not My Life, said that Young believed in the film far more than he himself did. There was a tribute to Young shown before its screening at the 360 | 365 George Eastman House Film Festival. A film reviewer at Post Magazine called Young "a legendary documentary cinematographer."

== Bibliography ==
- Nancy Keefe Rhodes (2012). "Not My Life: Filmmaker Robert Bilheimer's Latest Meditation on Good and Evil" (PDF). Stone Canoe.
