= Operation Stormy Nights =

2004 FBI anti-human-trafficking operation

- Part of "Innocence Lost"
- Operation name: Operation Stormy Nights
- Part of: "Innocence Lost"
- Type: Anti-Human-Trafficking sting operation
- Scope: domestic

Participants
- Executed by: U.S Federal Bureau of Investigation

Mission
- Target: Human traffickers

Timeline
- Date executed: 2004

Results
- Arrests: 12
- Miscellaneous results: the release of 23 female child (12-17yr) prostitutes

Operation Stormy Nights was an early major anti-human-trafficking operation by the Federal Bureau of Investigation (FBI). Operations took place in Oklahoma and brought to light organized crime networks trafficking female minors along United States Numbered Highways, where the girls were forced into prostitution to service truck drivers.

== Onset ==
The operation was undertaken in 2004 and resulted in the release of 23 girls from child prostitution. Twelve pimps were arrested. Most of these traffickers' victims were between 12 and 17 years of age. Lieutenant Alan Prince said that operations like Stormy Nights "are difficult because the girls are always on the move... and when you find them, it's hard to talk to them." This sting operation was headed by FBI agent Mike Beaver, who was working as an undercover agent.

== Sex trafficking ==
One of the human trafficking victims rescued in Stormy Nights was a girl named Angie. Beaver called Angie "a normal, typical American teenager." Angie, from Wichita, Kansas, was being forced into prostitution with another girl, Melissa, in the Midwestern United States. They were both teenagers at the time.

== Short film ==
Angie was later interviewed in the documentary film Not My Life, in which Angie explains how she and Melissa were expected to engage in sexual intercourse with truck drivers at a truck stop and steal their money. Angie said that, while looking through one of these drivers' wallets, she found pictures of the man's grandchildren and realized that he was old enough to be her and Melissa's grandfather. She recounts this story disgustedly and almost crying, and says, "I wanted to die." Beaver also appears in the film, saying, "It's not just truck drivers. We're seeing them purchased and abused by both white collar and blue collar individuals." Robert Bilheimer, the film's director, said that Angie did not fit the stereotype for a girl at risk of being sexually trafficked: she was from the Heartland, attended a private school and, when her parents divorced, she began acting out as a way of seeking attention. A man abducted her when she was 12 years old, violated the Mann Act by transporting her to another state, and began trafficking her sexually. While being trafficked, Angie was expected to engage in 40 sex acts every night, charging $20 for oral sex, $40 for vaginal sex, and $80 for both. Her trafficker threatened to kill her if she refused to perform these acts. Bilheimer said that the truck drivers Angie was expected to service either did not know or did not want to know what would happen to her if she did not give all of the money she earned to her pimp.

Another girl who was rescued in Stormy Nights, one of Angie's friends, was sent to a district attorney in order to facilitate the preparation of her testimony, and the DA told the girl that he wouldn't talk to her until she had performed fellatio on him. Bilheimer said that, while there is no way of being certain how many girls like Angie are being sexually trafficked, "diligent people out there have arrived at a bare minimum figure of... one hundred thousand girls, eight to fifteen [performing] ten sex acts a day", adding up to "a billion unpunished crimes of sexual violence on an annual basis." While Bilheimer interviewed Beaver at a Midwestern truck stop like the ones at which Angie was trafficked, someone wrote "Fuck you, asshole!" in the dirt on Beaver's car. Bilheimer said that this act demonstrated that many truck drivers hate law enforcement, although he said that "there are some good truckers out there," like those who are part of Truckers Against Trafficking, an organization opposing human trafficking by raising awareness on the subject among truck drivers. When news of Stormy Nights was made public, there was a strong public response across the country, so the FBI established "Innocence Lost", a new department working to free children from prostitution.

== Bibliography ==
- Nancy Keefe Rhodes (2012). "Not My Life: Filmmaker Robert Bilheimer's Latest Meditation on Good and Evil" (PDF). Stone Canoe. Archived from the original (PDF) on October 26, 2014.
