= Bilheimer =

Bilheimer is a surname. Notable people with the surname include:

- Robert Bilheimer (21st century), American film director, son of Robert S.
- Robert S. Bilheimer (1917–2006), American theologian
