= Sheila White =

Sheila White may refer to:

- Sheila White (actress) (1948–2018), English actress
- Sheila White (activist) (born 1988), American human trafficking victim
- Burlington Northern & Santa Fe Railway Co. v. White, a 2006 case decided by the Supreme Court of the United States
