= Eugenia Bonetti =

Italian nun and human rights activist

Sister Eugenia Bonetti M.C.
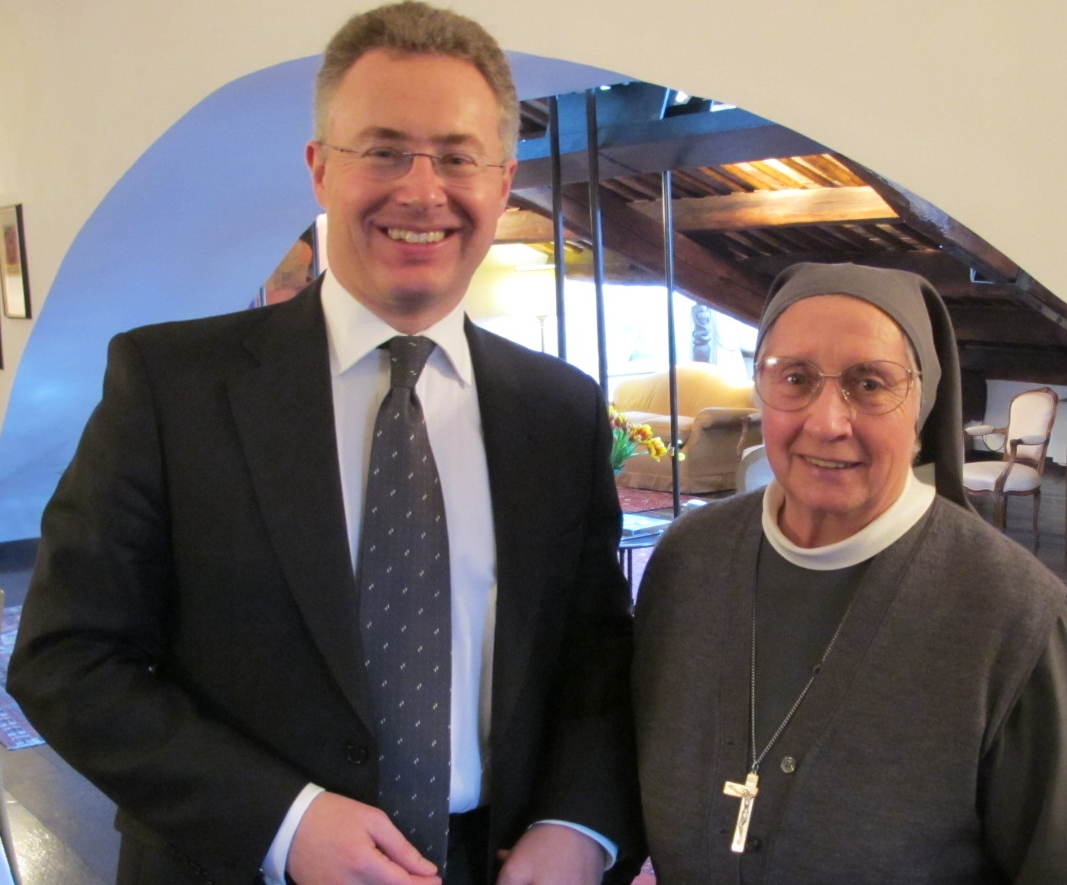
- Eugenia Bonetti (right) and British diplomat Nigel Baker (left)
- Archdiocese: Naples

Personal details
- Denomination: Christianity
- Residence: Naples, Campania, Italy
- Occupation: Leader of the Italian Union of Major Superiors' work against human trafficking

Eugenia Bonetti is a nun who works to rescue girls from being trafficked in Italy and help women leave the country's prostitution industry.

== Life ==
She is a Consolata Missionary Sister, a Master of Counselling, and a member of the Italian Union of Major Superiors, leading the organization's work against human trafficking. In this capacity, she is in charge of 250 nuns around the world who work to help young girls and women exit prostitution.

She appears in the documentary film Not My Life, in which she speaks about her work in Italy. In 2005, she participated in a conference sponsored by the Holy See in order to explore how the Catholic Church can provide better pastoral care for women forced into prostitution. She won the International Women of Courage Award in 2007 and the European Citizens' Prize in 2013.

In December 2012, she founded the association Slaves No More (Mai più schiave).

Pope Francis chose her to write the texts for the Good Friday Stations of the Cross at the Colosseum in 2019.

== Awards ==
In December 2024, Eugenia Bonetti was included on the BBC's 100 Women list.
