= I'm Still Here =

I'm Still Here may refer to:

== Literature ==
- I'm Still Here (book), a 2018 memoir by Austin Channing Brown
- Ainda Estou Aqui (in English: I'm Still Here), a 2015 memoir by Marcelo Rubens Paiva

== Film and television ==
- I'm Still Here: The Truth About Schizophrenia, a 1996 documentary film directed by Robert Bilheimer
- I'm Still Here (2010 film), a mockumentary directed by Casey Affleck
- "I'm Still Here" (Desperate Housewives), an episode of Desperate Housewives
- I'm Still Here (2024 film), a film directed by Walter Salles

== Music ==
- "I'm Still Here" (Juliana Kanyomozi song)
- I'm Still Here (album), a 2010 album by Mindy McCready
- "I'm Still Here" (Follies song), a song from Stephen Sondheim's musical Follies
- "I'm Still Here" (Vertical Horizon song)
- "I'm Still Here (Jim's Theme)," a 2002 song by John Rzeznik
- "I'm Still Here," a song by The Notations
- "I'm Still Here," the final, hidden track on the 1991 album Woodface by Crowded House
- "I'm Still Here," a song by Kula Shaker from Peasants, Pigs & Astronauts
- "I'm Still Here," a song by Tom Waits from Alice
- ""I'm Still Here" (Sia song)
