= I'm Still Here: The Truth About Schizophrenia =

- Directed by: Robert Bilheimer; Richard Young
- Written by: Robert Bilheimer
- Produced by: William Wheeler
- Starring: Susan Gingerich; Fredrick J. Frese
- Cinematography: Richard Young
- Edited by: Lorraine Salk
- Music by: Susan Justin
- Production company: Worldwide Documentaries
- Distributed by: Wheeler Communications
- Release date: 1996
- Running time: 65 minutes
- Country: United States
- Language: English

I'm Still Here: The Truth About Schizophrenia is a documentary film about schizophrenia. This 65-minute, black-and-white film was written and directed by Robert Bilheimer. Bilheimer began working on the film soon after being nominated for an Academy Award for the film The Cry of Reason: Beyers Naude – An Afrikaner Speaks Out. Psychiatrist Stephen Mark Goldfinger cowrote the film.

The National Alliance for Research on Schizophrenia and Depression aided in the film's production, which was complete by 1992, despite the film not being released until 1996. The following year, a VHS recording of the film was distributed by Wheeler Communications. Susan Gingerich appears in the film, as does Fredrick J. Frese. A National Health Service Corps reviewer called the film "extraordinarily moving."
