= A Closer Walk =

- Logo for A Closer Walk
- Directed by: Robert Bilheimer
- Produced by: Robert Bilheimer; Heidi Ostertag (co-producer); Bill Stetson (co-producer)
- Narrated by: Glenn Close; Will Smith
- Cinematography: Richard Young
- Edited by: Anthony DeLuca
- Distributed by: Worldwide Documentaries
- Release date: 2003
- Running time: 85 minutes
- Country: Australia
- Language: English

A Closer Walk is Robert Bilheimer's documentary film about the global AIDS epidemic. Narrated by Glenn Close and Will Smith, A Closer Walk features cinematography by Richard D. Young, interviews with the Dalai Lama, Bono, and Kofi Annan, and musical contributions by Annie Lennox, The Neville Brothers, Dido, Eric Clapton, Moby, Geoffrey Oryema, and Sade.

Subjects and storylines encompass the broad spectrum of the global AIDS experience and include people with HIV/AIDS from all walks of life; AIDS children and orphans and those caring for them; doctors, nurses, and social workers; human rights advocates; and prominent scientists, economists, researchers, government leaders, and NGO officials. The film's basic themes remain, what are the underlying causes of AIDS; the relationship between health, dignity, and human rights; and the universal need for action, compassion, and commitment to counter what has become the worst plague in human history.

== Production ==
Conceived in 1996 with Jonathan Mann, A Closer Walk took three years to develop. For the film, more than 50 women, men, and young people have been interviewed or profiled in the following regions and locations: Uganda, South Africa, Haiti, Switzerland, India, Nepal, Ukraine, Cambodia, and various locations in the United States including New York City, Kansas City, San Francisco, and Cambridge. Production of A Closer Walk began in February 2000, and was completed in December 2002.

== Cast ==
- Glenn Close – Narrator
- Will Smith – Narrator
- Kofi Annan – Himself
- Bono – Himself
- Dalai Lama – Himself

== Critical response ==
The film has received international critical acclaim. Writing for the Gannett News Service, chief film critic Jack Garner gave A Closer Walk his highest rating, calling it a "beautifully told story of suffering that inspires hope and action." In South Africa, reviewing the film prior to its national airing on South African television, Claire Keaton of the Sunday Times called the film "unforgettable." In New Delhi, following the film's India premiere, Rajeshwari Sharma of the Economic Times said that A Closer Walk is "an absolutely brilliant account of the deadliest plague humankind has ever known."

== Distribution ==
A Closer Walk is a production of Worldwide Documentaries, a not-for-profit film production company focusing on matters of cultural, social, and humanitarian interest.
