= Nicholas Alipui =

UNICEF's Director and Senior Advisor

- Occupations: Director and Senior Adviser on the Post-2015 Development Agenda
- Employer: UNICEF
- Organization: Global Network for Sustained Elimination of Iodine Deficiency

Nicholas Kojo Alipui is UNICEF's Director and Senior Advisor on the Post-2015 Development Agenda. A native of Ghana, Alipui spent 25 years in various positions within UNICEF, most recently as Director of Programmes. Alipui also heads the Global Network for Sustained Elimination of Iodine Deficiency.

In 2000, Alipui was UNICEF's representative in Kenya. By 2004, he had become UNICEF's representative in the Philippines and called attention to the lack of official recognition of child pornography as a problem in the country. In this capacity, he also spoke out against the prevalence of child soldiers in the country and denounced infant formula, calling on the country's mothers to breastfeed. In 2008, as Director of Programmes, he met with the President of Madagascar Marc Ravalomanana to strengthen ties between Madagascar and the United Nations.

In 2010, Alipui said that UNICEF and its partners in the Roll Back Malaria Partnership hoped to end malaria deaths by 2015.

In 2011, the European Food Safety Authority (EFSA) allowed infant formula company Mead Johnson to claim that adding docosahexaenoic acid to their infant formula contributes to developing infants' visual system. However, Alipui opposed the EFSA's decision, saying that "there can be little doubt that the use of such health claims can mislead parents into thinking that the formulas are as good as, if not better than breast milk." He was interviewed in Not My Life, an independent documentary film about human trafficking.
