= Cottesloe, Johannesburg =

Cottesloe
- Cottesloe's location in Gauteng
- Coordinates: 26°11′42″S 28°2′3″E
- Country: South Africa
- Province: Gauteng
- City: Johannesburg

Area
  - Total: 0.33 km^{2} (0.13 sq mi)

Population (2011)
  - Total: 1,403
  - Density: 4,252/km^{2} (11,010/sq mi)

Races
  - White: 7.6%
  - Asian: 2.3%
  - Cape Coloured: 3.4%
  - Black: 86.0%
  - Other: 0.8%

Languages
  - Tswana: 16.7%
  - English: 15.9%
  - Zulu: 14.5%
  - Southern Ndebele: 12.3%
  - Other: 11.6%

Cottesloe is a small suburb west of downtown Johannesburg, around 3 km northwest of City Hall, west of Braamfontein, north of Vrededorp and Jan Hofmeyer, and south of Parktown. It is named by the first Minister of Lands, Adam Jameson, after Cottesloe, Western Australia, around 11 km southwest of Perth.

In 1960, the neighborhood became famous as the site of the Cottesloe Consultation.

== See also ==
- Cottesloe Reformed Church

== Sources ==
- Raper, Peter Edmund (2004). New Dictionary of South African Place Names. Johannesburg/Cape Town: Jonathan Ball Publishers.
