= Human trafficking in Ghana =

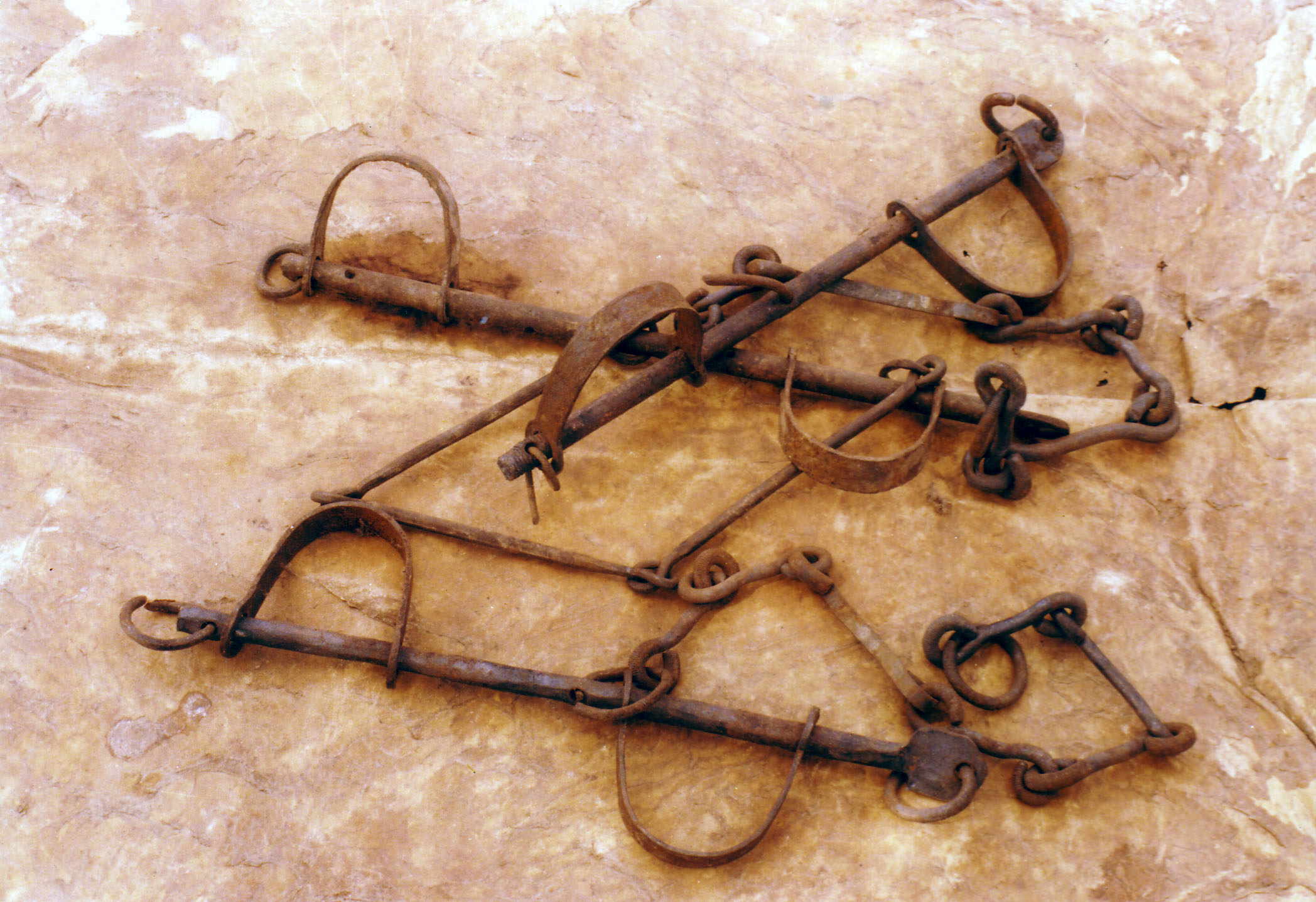
Slave Shackles in Ghana

In 2009, Ghana was a country of origin, transit, and destination for women and children subjected to trafficking in persons, specifically forced labour and forced prostitution. The nonconsensual exploitation of Ghanaian citizens, particularly children, was more common than the trafficking of foreign migrants. The movement of internally trafficked children was either from rural to urban areas, or from one rural area to another, as from farming to fishing communities.

In 2009, Ghanaian boys and girls were subjected to conditions of forced labor within the country in fishing, domestic servitude, street hawking, begging, portering, and agriculture. Ghanaian girls, and to a lesser extent boys, are subjected to commercial sexual exploitation within Ghana. Internal labour traffickers were commonly freelance operators, and may have been known to members of the source community. Uninformed parents may not have understood that by cooperating with trafficking offenders, they may expose their children to bonded placement, coercion, or outright sale.

Media in 2009 cited 50 Ghanaian women recruited for work in Russia and subsequently forced into prostitution. Women and girls from China, Nigeria, Ivory Coast, and Burkina Faso were subjected to forced prostitution after arriving in Ghana. Citizens from other West African countries were subjected to forced labor in Ghana in agriculture or involuntary domestic servitude. Trafficking victims endured extremes of harsh treatment, including long hours, debt bondage, lack of pay, physical risks, and sexual abuse.

The country ratified the 2000 UN TIP Protocol in August 2012.

The U.S. State Department's Office to Monitor and Combat Trafficking in Persons placed Ghana in "Tier 2 Watchlist" in 2017 and 2023.

In 2023, the Organised Crime Index gave Ghana a score of 7 out of 10 for human trafficking.

== Government response (2009) ==
The Government of Ghana does not fully comply with the minimum standards for the elimination of trafficking. However, it is making significant efforts to do so, despite limited resources. Ghana increased its law enforcement efforts by prosecuting and convicting an increased number of traffickers, including the first convictions relating to forced child labor in the Lake Volta fishing industry. The Ghanaian Police partnered with Interpol to host regional training for law enforcement officials from Anglophone Africa, and the government took steps to establish four regional anti-trafficking units to manage cases more effectively at the regional level.

In August 2009, the president appointed new members to the Human Trafficking Management Board, which had been disbanded when the previous government left office in January 2009. However, the government did not demonstrate increased efforts to ensure that victims receive adequate protection, such as funding a shelter for trafficking victims, or increasing assistance to NGOs or international organizations to provide trafficking victim care.

=== Prosecution (2009) ===
The Government of Ghana demonstrated improved anti-human trafficking law enforcement efforts in 2010. Ghana prohibits all forms of trafficking through its 2005 Human Trafficking Act (HTA), which prescribes a minimum penalty of five years' imprisonment for all forms of trafficking. This penalty is sufficiently stringent and commensurate with penalties prescribed for other serious offenses, such as rape. In July 2009, the Ghanaian parliament passed a law amending the definition of trafficking to give the HTA uniformity with the language of the 2000 UN TIP Protocol.

The Ghana Police Service (GPS) maintains an Anti-human trafficking Unit (AHTU) in its Criminal Investigation Division, which opened 31 trafficking investigations in 2009. The government initiated 15 trafficking prosecutions during the year, an increase over five prosecutions in 2008, and convicted six traffickers in 2009, an increase over the one conviction obtained in 2008. The AHTU claimed credit for repatriating 20 child victims of trafficking to neighboring countries. According to the AHTU, 61 percent of all trafficking cases reported in Ghana were labor-related, while 39 percent were sexual exploitation cases.

In June 2009, the government convicted three Chinese nationals of trafficking eight Chinese women to Ghana for exploitation in prostitution. The Accra Circuit Court sentenced the primary trafficking offender to 17 years' imprisonment, including 10 years for human trafficking and two years for conspiracy. His brother received a 12-year sentence - 10 years for abetment and two years for conspiracy. In a second case, an offender received a jail sentence of eight years' imprisonment for trafficking three Ghanaian children to Côte d'Ivoire. These sentences were well above the mandatory five year minimum.

In January 2010, the Agona Swedru Circuit Court convicted a Ghanaian woman for enslaving two boys, ages six and eight, from the Central Region to fish on Lake Volta. The woman was sentenced to nine years' imprisonment - the first ever prosecution of a domestic trafficking offender in Ghana. The government joined with neighboring countries, as well as international organizations and foreign embassies, to prosecute transnational cases, most recently in a successful bid to break up a trafficking and prostitution ring that sent at least 50 Ghanaian women to Russia for the sex trade.

=== Protection (2009) ===
The government demonstrated overall improved victim protection efforts during the year. The government did not employ formal procedures for the identification of victims among vulnerable groups, such as women in prostitution or children at work sites, though it did show increased efforts at ad hoc identification of such victims. The government continued to operate dedicated trafficking shelters for victims of forced labor - in Osu and Medina in the greater Accra region, and in the Atebubu Amant District Assembly in the Brong Ahafo region - but lacked shelter facilities for victims of sex trafficking. The government provided an unknown amount of funding for these shelters.

Ghanaian authorities referred most identified victims to shelters operated by NGOs. According to the AHTU, victims received protective support during and after trials, and prosecutors took their statements behind closed doors to ensure their safety and conceal their identity. With the Interior Minister's approval, a trafficking victim may remain permanently in Ghana if deemed to be in the victim's best interest, though no victims were given such residency during the last year. There was no formal referral process to transfer victims in protective custody to other facilities. The government provided some training to law enforcement officials on identification of trafficking victims.

The government encouraged victims to assist in the investigation and prosecution of traffickers, though many victims were children afraid to provide testimony. The government provided assistance to its nationals who may have been trafficked, with an eye to rehabilitation and reintegration into the life of the country. Some victims were given capital to start businesses, and others were supported to continue schooling or learn a trade. The government sustained partnerships with local and international NGOs to rescue and rehabilitate forced child laborers in fishing or mining during the reporting period.

=== Prevention (2009) ===
The Government of Ghana demonstrated renewed efforts to prevent trafficking over the last year. It conducted anti-trafficking education campaigns and workshops to prevent trafficking during the reporting period. Counter-trafficking officials spoke regularly with anti-trafficking messages on radio talk shows and on television. The Ghana Immigration Service maintained a task force responsible for patrolling the borders and ports to expose crimes related to human trafficking.

The government developed a draft for a national plan of action covering human trafficking. The Accra Metropolitan Assembly demolished Soldier Bar, a brothel in Accra known to have employed children in prostitution. Ghana is not a party to the 2000 UN TIP Protocol.

== See also ==
- Human rights in Ghana
- Crime in Ghana

General:

- Child labour in Africa
