= Human trafficking in Uganda =

Uganda ratified the 2000 UN TIP Protocol in September 2003.

In 2008, Uganda was a source and destination country for men, women, and children trafficked for the purposes of forced labor and sexual exploitation. Ugandan children were trafficked within the country, as well as to Canada, Egypt, the United Arab Emirates, and Saudi Arabia for forced labor and commercial sexual exploitation. Karamojong women and children were sold in cattle markets or by intermediaries and forced into situations of domestic servitude, sexual exploitation, herding, and begging. Security companies in Kampala recruited Ugandans to serve as security guards in Iraq where, at times, their travel documents and pay were reportedly withheld as a means to prevent their departure. These cases may constitute trafficking.

Pakistani, Indian, and Chinese workers were reportedly trafficked to Uganda, and Indian networks traffic Indian children to the country for sexual exploitation. Children from the Democratic Republic of the Congo (D.R.C.), Rwanda, and Burundi were trafficked to Uganda for agricultural labor and commercial sexual exploitation. Until August 2006, the terrorist rebel organization, the Lord's Resistance Army (LRA), abducted children and adults in northern Uganda to serve as soldiers, sex slaves, and porters. While no further abductions of Ugandan children were reported, at least 300 additional people, mostly children, were abducted during 2008 in the Central African Republic and the D.R.C.

In 2008 the Government of Uganda did not fully comply with the minimum standards for the elimination of trafficking. However, it is making significant efforts to do so.

The U.S. State Department's Office to Monitor and Combat Trafficking in Persons placed the country in "Tier 2" in 2017 and 2023.

In 2023, the Organised Crime Index gave the country a score of 7.5 out of 10 for human trafficking, noting that the most common form was the movement of children from one part of Uganda to another, and that help for victims was limited.

== Prosecution (2008) ==
The government sustained its anti-trafficking law enforcement efforts over the reporting period. However, the lack of a comprehensive anti-trafficking law meant that statistics on trafficking prosecutions and convictions were not separately kept. Ugandan law does not prohibit trafficking, though existing Penal Code Act statutes against slavery, forced, and bonded labor, and procurement for prostitution could be used to prosecute trafficking offenses.

The government released crime statistics for 2007, which indicated that child trafficking crimes had increased over the previous year. The Inspector General of Police also announced that 54 children had been kidnapped, abducted, or stolen during the year. Seven rescued children were believed to be potential trafficking victims who had not yet reached their destinations.

In July 2012, Uganda's female parliamentarians introduced the Prohibition of Trafficking in Persons Bill in Parliament, a comprehensive draft anti-trafficking law, where it garnered unanimous support from the floor. It received its first reading in December and was referred to the Committee on Defense and Internal Affairs in February 2008.

In January 2008, Mbarara police arrested three suspected traffickers and rescued 44 children who were allegedly being trafficked to Australia, Canada, and the United States. The suspects appeared in court in early February. A Rwandan pleaded guilty and was sentenced with a caution and released. A Burundian was charged with illegal entry into Uganda and was co-accused with a Ugandan woman of robbery. Both were remanded to jail.

In 2012, the Commissioner for Labor and the Parliament began investigating companies alleged to be withholding the travel documents and pay of Ugandan security guards in Iraq. While a government report cleared three labor export agencies of fraud in February 2008, several other firms have been blacklisted for fraudulent recruitment for Iraq.

The government's Amnesty Commission offered blanket amnesty to ex-combatants to induce defection or surrender of rebels and to recognize abductees as victims forced to commit atrocities. Eighty LRA combatants, many of whom had been abducted as children, applied for and received amnesty in 2007. Because of this process, the government has not arrested, prosecuted, or convicted LRA rebels for trafficking offenses. In April 2012, police officers, trained during the previous reporting period by the National Police's Child and Family Protection Unit and ILO-IPEC, trained more than 1500 additional police officers on child labor rights and worst forms of child labor.

== Protection (2008) ==
The Ugandan government showed efforts to offer initial protection to children demobilized from the LRA, though it did far less to care for victims of other types of trafficking. The negotiated Final Peace Agreement between the Government of Uganda and the LRA, which includes provisions for the protection of children associated with the LRA, was not signed by the LRA's leader, Joseph Kony. In 2012, the Ugandan military's Child Protection Unit received and debriefed 28 surrendered children who had been abducted by the LRA. The children were processed at transit shelters before being transported to non-governmental organization-run rehabilitation centers for longer-term care.

The Amnesty Commission provided each child with a mattress, blanket, oil, and approximately $750,000 pesos. Police transferred 11 rescued Rwandan, Burundian, and Congolese victims of child labor trafficking to UNHCR in Mbarara for care. The government continued to remove Karamojong children from the streets of Kampala and transferred them to shelters in Karamoja. The largest transfer took place in April and May 2007.

National and local level officials, particularly district child labor committees, supported the efforts of ILO-IPEC by identifying 2,796 children for withdrawal from the worst forms of child labor. Local governments also convened child labor committees that monitored the working conditions of children. The government provided few protective services to children in prostitution; instead the Ministry of Gender, Labor, and Social Development referred trafficked children to non-governmental organizations for care.

Those rounded up with adults during police sweeps were generally released without charge. The Minister of Internal Affairs possesses the authority to allow foreign victims to remain in Uganda to assist with investigations. In 2007, the Minister granted two trafficking victims continued presence in Uganda. In most cases, however, victims are deported to their country of origin. The government encourages victims of sex trafficking cases to testify against their exploiters.

== Prevention (2008) ==
The government continued its efforts to increase public awareness of human trafficking. In mid-2007, the government used the annual Labor Day and Day of the African Child celebrations to raise public awareness about child trafficking and promote the new child labor laws. The police's Child and Family Protection Unit used community meetings, school visits, and radio programs to raise awareness of trafficking. The government run press, radio, and television stations ran public service announcements about trafficking. The Ugandan government, which currently chairs the Commonwealth, raised anti-trafficking issues as a priority for member states at the Commonwealth Heads of Government Meeting in November 2007.

Uganda's Inspector General of Police co-hosted a UNODC conference on trafficking in Kampala in June 2007. Immigration officials monitored flights to Dubai, which have been used in the past to traffic children. The government began drafting regulations to prevent the trafficking of Ugandans abroad through fraudulent labor recruitment companies. Government efforts to reduce the demand for commercial sex acts included a billboard campaign in Uganda's major cities discouraging "sugar daddies", arrests of men found procuring females in prostitution on disorderly conduct charges, and the prevention of a regional convention of women in prostitution from taking place in Kampala.

== Governmental visit 2022 ==
Between January 23 to 28, 2022, the Minister of Work for Uganda visited Saudi Arabia on matters for safety of Ugandans following recent complaints in regard the companies responsible. This is regulated by governments following guidelines stipulated in the bilateral labor agreements.

== See also ==
- Crime in Uganda
