= Human trafficking in Brazil =

Human trafficking in Brazil is an ongoing problem. Brazil is a source country for men, women, girls, and boys subjected to human trafficking, specifically forced prostitution within the country and abroad, as well as a source country for men and boys in forced labor within the country. The United States Department of Homeland Security, describes human trafficking as "the use of force, fraud, or coercion to obtain some type of labor or commercial sex act."

Human trafficking is a condemned violation of human rights by international law. U.S. State Department's Office to Monitor and Combat Trafficking in Persons placed the country in "Tier 2" in 2017. A country being rated a Tier 2 country means that the specific country does not fully meet minimum expectations set for countries by the Trafficking Victims Protection Act of 2000, but are making clear effort to meet the standards of compliance.

== Sex trafficking ==
According to the United Nations Office on Drugs and Crime, sex trafficking of Brazilian women occurs in every Brazilian state and the federal district. Sex trafficking is the "recruitment, harboring, transportation, provision, obtaining, patronizing, or soliciting of a person for the purposes of a commercial sex act, in which the commercial sex act is induced by force, fraud, or coercion..." A large number of Brazilian women and children, many from the state of Goiás, are found in forced prostitution abroad, often in Spain, Italy, Portugal, the United Kingdom, The Netherlands, Switzerland, France, Germany, and the United States, but also as far away as Japan. Brazilian authorities have uncovered evidence that foreign organized criminal networks, particularly from Russia and Spain, are involved in sex trafficking of Brazilian women. Transgender women are a population especially vulnerable to human trafficking in Brazil, due in part to the high number of trans people already in the commercial sex industry. There is evidence that some Brazilian transsexuals have been subjected to forced prostitution abroad. Brazilian women and children are also subjected to forced prostitution in neighboring countries such as Argentina, Suriname, French Guiana, Venezuela, and Paraguay. To a lesser extent, women from neighboring countries have been identified in sexual servitude in Brazil. In cases of sex trafficking to and within Brazil, it is common for traffickers to move victimized people from poorer, more rural states, to richer, more metropolitan areas. This move is in part motivated by child sex tourists, people coming to Brazil in order to take advantage of the more lax regulations and easier access to victims. Child sex tourists that come to Brazil are for the most part, from Europe.

== Slave labor ==
Under Brazilian law, the term "trabalho escravo", or slave labor, can signify forced labor or labor performed during exhausting work days or in degrading working conditions. More than 25,000 Brazilian men are subjected to slave labor within the country, typically on cattle ranches, logging and mining camps, sugar-cane plantations, and large farms producing corn, cotton, soy, and charcoal. Some boys have been identified as slave laborers in cattle ranching, mining, and the production of charcoal. Forced labor victims are commonly lured with promises of good pay by local recruiters – known as "gatos" – in rural northeastern states to interior locations where many victims are subjected to debt bondage.

Most internally trafficked forced laborers originated from the states of Maranhão and Piauí, while Pará and Mato Grosso states received the higher number of internally trafficked slave laborers. Labor trafficking victims are also found in the Cerrado, the Atlantic Forest, and the Pantanal. Children in involuntary domestic servitude, particularly involving teenage girls, also constitute a problem in the country.

A recent U.S. Department of Labor study showed that Brazil still employs children mostly in the agricultural sector, as well as the mining and textile industries with a total of 16 products. It was estimated by the International Labor Organization that in 2014, forced labor generated $150 billion in annual world wide profit.

== Brazil as a destination ==
To a lesser extent, Brazil is a destination for the trafficking of men, women, and children from Bolivia, Lebanon, Bangladesh, Paraguay, China and African countries for forced labor in garment factories and textile sweatshops in metropolitan centers such as São Paulo. African, Arab and Bangladeshi migrants forced to work in the halal chicken factories in the Paraná, Santa Catarina, and Rio Grande do Sul. Child sex tourism remains a serious problem, particularly in resort and coastal areas in Brazil's northeast. Child sex tourists typically arrive from Europe and, to a lesser extent, the United States.

== Prosecution ==
The Brazilian government maintained law enforcement efforts to confront human trafficking crimes during the past year. Brazilian laws prohibit most forms of trafficking in persons. Law 12.015, which entered into effect in August 2009, amended Sections 231 and 231-A of the Brazilian penal code to strengthen penalties against potential sex trafficking offenders. Sections 231 and 231-A prohibit promoting or facilitating movement to, from, or within the country for the purposes of prostitution or other forms of sexual exploitation, prescribing penalties of three to eight years’ imprisonment. Sentences may be increased up to 12 years when violence, threats, or fraud are used, or if the victim is a child. The above penalties are sufficiently stringent and commensurate with those prescribed for other serious crimes, such as rape. These statutes encompass activity that does not constitute trafficking, however, such as consensual smuggling or movement for the purpose of prostitution.

=== Slave labor ===
Labor trafficking is criminalized pursuant to Section 149 of the penal code, which prohibits "trabalho escravo", or reducing a person to a condition analogous to slavery, including by forcing a person to work or by subjecting a person to exhausting work days or degrading working conditions. This statute, therefore, prohibits treatment that is considered human trafficking, such as forced labor, as well as other treatment, such as poor labor conditions, which is beyond the definition of human trafficking. The penalty of two to eight years’ imprisonment is sufficiently stringent.

However, Brazilian law may not adequately criminalize other means of non-physical coercion or fraud used to subject workers to forced labor, such as threatening foreign migrants with deportation unless they continued to work. A 2006 presidential decree included a stated goal to amend Brazilian anti-trafficking laws to achieve parity between penalties applied to sex trafficking and slave labor crimes; As of 2010, such amendments remained unrealized. A bill first proposed in 2001 which would allow the government to confiscate and redistribute property on which forced labor has been employed is still pending.

The government maintained efforts to investigate forced labor crimes. During the reporting period, the government prosecuted and convicted 15 persons under the "trabalho escravo" law. The 15 convicted offenders were given sentences ranging from 30 months to 10 years and six months plus fines, compared with 23 convictions for trabalho escravo during the previous year. Convicted trafficking offenders had subjected workers to slave labor on a rice and soy plantation, a palm-oil plantation, and cattle ranches. The Ministry of Labor’s anti-slave labor mobile unit, created in 1995, increased the number of rescue operations conducted last year; the unit’s labor inspectors continued to free victims, and require those responsible to pay approximately $3.3 million in fines. In the past, mobile unit inspectors did not typically seize physical evidence or attempt to interview witnesses with the goal of developing a criminal investigation or prosecution; labor inspectors and labor prosecutors can only apply civil penalties, and their anti-trafficking efforts were not always coordinated with public ministry prosecutors, who initiate criminal cases in federal court. In addition to weak coordination among the police, judiciary, and prosecutors, local political pressure and the remoteness of areas in which slave labor was practiced were cited as impediments in criminal prosecution of slave labor offenders.

=== Sex trafficking ===
In 2010, five sex trafficking offenders were convicted in one case involving Brazilian women trafficked to Switzerland, with sentences ranging from one to six years’ imprisonment. Such results represent a decrease in convictions when compared with 22 sex trafficking convictions achieved during the previous reporting period. There were no reports of convictions for internal sex trafficking, although several individuals were arrested for this crime. Authorities collaborated with foreign governments in a number of transnational trafficking cases involving victims trafficked to Italy, Spain, Portugal, Canada, Switzerland, Mexico, Argentina, and the United States. An integrated sex trafficking database which will collect information from law enforcement, the judiciary branch, and anti-trafficking centers around the country remained in the testing stage.

=== Transgender Victims ===
The transgender population of Brazil is at especially high risk for sex trafficking. According to the United States Department of State, Office to Monitor and Combat Trafficking in Persons "2021 Trafficking in Persons Report: Brazil", as of 2019 "90 percent of transgender women in Brazil are in commercial sex, and of those in Rio de Janeiro, more than half are in a situation at high risk for human trafficking." Transgender people are also at high risk for often violent murders. "In Brazil, data from Antra (National Association of Trans and Queer People) show that every 48 hours, one trans person dies. 82% of trans victims are black people. There were cruel practices, such as carbonization, stoning, and decapitation in 80% of the cases." In 2017, the Trans Murder Monitoring Project reported that at least 167 trans people were murdered in Brazil. A combination of both homophobia and racism contribute to such a high rate of trans victims, and some poor communities in Brazil are especially prejudiced against trans women of color. Gilmara Cunha, a trans-black woman who was raised in one such community and is now a psychologist and activist for LGBTQIA+ rights, and spoke about the experience of the trans-black woman in poorer Brazilian communities. Cunha describes these communities as "places where sexism, transphobia, and prejudice are repeated...in Brazil, to be trans means you fight to have something to eat. It means to be a disposable body in a heteronormative society, a society that kills our lives daily."

=== Official complicity ===
Credible NGO reporting indicated serious official complicity in trafficking crimes at the local level, alleging that police turned a blind eye to child prostitution and potential human trafficking activity in commercial sex sites. In the past, reporting indicates that state police officials were involved in the killing or intimidation of witnesses involved in testifying against police officials in labor exploitation or slave labor hearings, and a few Brazilian legislators have sought to interfere with the operation of the labor inspection teams. Five federal police officers and two federal police administrators were arrested for alleged involvement in trafficking Chinese workers to São Paulo to work in the garment industry, and one federal judge was charged with trafficking Brazilian women to Portugal for sexual exploitation. Authorities provided specialized anti-trafficking training to law enforcement officers.

== Protection ==
The Brazilian government sustained efforts to provide trafficking victims with services during the year. Authorities continued to use mobile inspection teams to identify forced laborers, but did not report formal procedures for identifying trafficking victims among other vulnerable populations, such as women in prostitution. The Ministry of Social Development provided generalized shelter, counseling, and medical aid to women and girls who were victims of sex trafficking through its network of 400 centers for victims of domestic violence and sexual abuse.

In 2010 the government established a women's center for victims of violence, including human trafficking, via an agreement of partnership with the Paraguayan and Argentine governments in a general migrant's assistance center in the tri-border area. Brazilian police continued to refer child sex trafficking victims to government-run Service to Combat Violence, Abuse, and Sexual Exploitation of Children and Adolescents for care. While the government reported training workers at more than 600 centers and health care facilities around the country to assist trafficking victims, NGOs noted that many centers were not prepared to handle trafficking cases and were underfunded. NGOs provided additional victim services, sometimes with limited government funding, and long-term shelter options were generally unavailable.

The Brazilian government, with assistance from UNODC, continued to fund regional anti-trafficking offices in conjunction with state governments in São Paulo, Rio de Janeiro, Goiás, Pernambuco, Ceará, and Pará and opened two new offices in Acre and Bahia. These offices are responsible for providing victim assistance, in addition to preventing and combating human trafficking, although NGOs report that quality of service varies and that some centers focus on public awareness as opposed to victim care. Authorities also operated an assistance post to aid repatriated citizens who might be trafficking victims in the airport in Belem. In early 2010, the government took over responsibility for an assistance post in the São Paulo airport previously run by an NGO. During 2009, the post assisted 444 individuals, nine of which were identified as trafficking victims. Authorities plan to create additional airport posts in Fortaleza, Salvador, and Rio de Janeiro in 2010.

=== Slave labor ===
During the year, the Ministry of Labor's mobile units identified and freed 3,769 victims of slave labor through 156 operations targeting 350 properties. Such results compare with 5,016 victims freed through 154 operations targeting 290 properties in 2008. The Ministry of Labor awarded forced labor victims a portion of funds which were derived from fines levied against the landowners or employers identified during the operations. However, forced labor victims, typically adult Brazilian men, were not eligible for government-provided shelter assistance, though they were provided with three months’ salary at minimum wage, as well as job training and travel assistance when available. The government did not generally encourage victims of slave labor to participate in criminal investigations or prosecutions.

Some NGOs provided such victim services to male victims. According to NGOs, some rescued slave laborers have been re-trafficked, due to lack of effective prosecutions of recruiters of trabalho escravo, few alternate forms of employment for the rescued workers, and lack of legal aid to help them pursue their own complaints against exploitative employers.

=== Sex trafficking ===
The government encouraged sex trafficking victims to participate in investigations and prosecutions of trafficking, though victims often were reluctant to testify due to fear of reprisals from traffickers and corrupt law enforcement officials. NGOs allege that police often dismissed cases involving sex trafficking victims, and some victims reported discrimination or prejudicial treatment due to the fact that they worked in prostitution prior to being trafficked and were therefore not considered victims.

Some victims of sex trafficking were offered short-term protection under a witness protection program active in 10 states, which was generally regarded as lacking resources. The government did not detain, fine, or otherwise penalize identified victims of trafficking for unlawful acts committed as a direct result of being trafficked. However, the government does not provide foreign trafficking victims with legal alternatives to removal to countries where they may face hardship or retribution, and law enforcement personnel noted that undocumented foreign victims were often deported before they could assist with prosecutions against their traffickers. Brazilian consular officers received guidance on how to report trafficking cases and assist trafficking victims.

== Prevention ==
The Brazilian government increased efforts to prevent human trafficking in recent years. Federal authorities generally maintained cooperation with international organizations and NGOs on anti-trafficking activities. Various government agencies implemented parts of the 2008-2010 National Plan for Combating Trafficking in Persons. In recent years, however, challenges remain due to socioeconomic factors, such as poverty and unemployment, which contribute significantly to the vulnerability of individuals to trafficking. Civil society organizations, religious officials, and various government agencies collaborated on anti-trafficking initiatives. Data from 2021 highlighted that economic hardship, compounded by the COVID-19 pandemic, has left an estimated 9.5 million Brazilians unemployed, intensifying vulnerability to exploitation.A national hotline for reporting incidents of child sexual abuse and exploitation received approximately 12,000 calls on sexual exploitation of children, including a total of 200 reported calls on child trafficking.

Articles 206 and 207 of Brazil's penal code prohibit the trafficking-related offense of fraudulent recruitment or enticement of workers, internally or internationally, prescribing penalties of one to three years’ imprisonment. The Ministry of Labor's “dirty list,” which publicly identifies individuals and corporate entities the government has determined to have been responsible for crimes under the trabalho escravo law, continued to provide civil penalties to those engaged in this serious crime. A recent version, released in January 2010, cited 164 employers, some of whom, because of this designation, were denied access to credit by public and private financial institutions because of this designation. During the year, however, a number of individuals and corporate entities were able to avoid opprobrium by suing to remove their names from the “dirty list” or reincorporating under a different name.Despite these measures, the effectiveness of legal framework is often undermined by corruption and inadequate enforcement. As of the most recent Assessment, the country continues to face challenges with transparency, as the 'dirty list' revealed 149 cases where companies were flagged but no enforcement actions were taken.

The government took measures to reduce demand for commercial sexual exploitation of children by conducting a multi-media campaign during the 2010 Carnaval holiday period, reaching an estimated audience of 600,000,000. Action brigades distributed a wide variety of awareness materials, radio announcements were broadcast daily, and airlines made information available on their flights. In 2024, new campaigns led by civil society organizations have aimed to raised awareness about the dangers of human trafficking, particularly focusing on child victims and using social media platforms to engage younger audiences. These initiatives often include educational programs that inform communities about the risks and signs of trafficking. Reports noted a 15% increase in hotline calls to suspected cases of trafficking, attributed to these new educational initiatives. In recent years, collaboration with transportation companies has expanded, with additional training and resources provided to prevent child exploitation in transit areas. The 2024 report highlighted significant partnerships established between local law enforcement and transportation authorities to strengthen these efforts. As of 2023, over 5,000 transportation workers and law enforcement officials have completed specialized training in identifying signs of trafficking.

The government also sought to reduce demand for commercial sex acts along Brazil's highways. In partnership with a Brazilian energy company and an international organization, authorities trained highway police and engaged truck drivers in the fight against the commercial sexual exploitation of children. Finally, Brazilian authorities relied on operational partnerships with foreign governments to extradite and prosecute foreign sex tourists, though there were no reports of prosecutions or convictions for child sex tourism within Brazil. The establishment of international agreements, including updates made in 2024, is seen as crucial for enhancing Brazil's ability to combat trafficking effectively providing a framework of cooperation with other nations. Brazil's partnerships with neighboring countries have resulted in joint operations that identified over 300 trafficking victims across borders in 2022, demonstrating the impact of cross-border cooperation.The Brazilian military used the United Nations Peacekeeping Office’s anti-trafficking and forced labor training modules to train its troops prior to their deployment abroad as part of international peacekeeping missions. In 2024, ongoing evaluations of training effectiveness were highlighted as essential to ensure that military personnel are equipped to recognize and address human trafficking in operational contexts. Additionally, there are efforts to improve post-deployment support for troops who may encounter trafficking situations while serving abroad. These initiatives have contributed to the identification of trafficking incidents within peacekeeping operations, with recent reports noting a 20% increase in identification cases following these training improvements.

== See also ==
- Human rights in Brazil
