= Sheila White (activist) =

American activist

- Born: 1988 (age 37–38)
- Citizenship: United States
- Education: Bronx Community College
- Occupation: Activist
- Employer: Girls Educational and Mentoring Services
- Known for: Activism against sex trafficking

Sheila White (born 1988) is an African-American anti–sex trafficking activist, and a former human trafficking survivor herself, from The Bronx, New York City.

== Background ==
White grew up in a dysfunctional home and, during her teen years, was placed in foster care, where she was raped. She then attempted suicide and was transferred to a psychiatric hospital. At the age of 15, she was living in a group home, where she was abused by a pimp who forced her into prostitution. While a prostitute, White was battered, raped, and branded with irons. In 2003, she was battered next to the Port Authority Bus Terminal, without anyone even asking her if she needed help.

White eventually escaped from being trafficked and went on to work with Girls Educational and Mentoring Services in order to raise awareness on the issue in New York, and President Obama recognized her work by personally giving her an award at the Clinton Global Initiative. She was interviewed in the documentary film Not My Life about her experiences while being trafficked, and said, "There is a point where you begin to feel numb. You really feel like you're not even a person." In 2013, she spoke at the Disrupting Slavery Symposium, the first symposium of the Somaly Mam Foundation, saying that "we need a platform in which a survivor has the support and comfort needed to become a leader in the field."

She has three children and attends Bronx Community College, pursuing a Bachelor's degree in social work.

== See also ==
- List of kidnappings
- List of solved missing person cases (post-2000)
