= Human trafficking in Senegal =

Senegal ratified the 2000 UN TIP Protocol in October 2003.

In 2008, Senegal was a source, transit, and destination country for children and women trafficked for the purposes of forced labor and commercial sexual exploitation. Trafficking within the country was more prevalent than trans-border trafficking and the majority of victims are children. Within Senegal some boys called "talibes" were victims of trafficking, by promising to educate them, but subjecting them instead to forced begging and physical abuse. A 2007 study done by UNICEF, the ILO, and the World Bank found that 6,480 talibe were forced to beg in Dakar alone. Women and girls were trafficked for domestic servitude and sexual exploitation, including for sex tourism, within Senegal. Transnationally, boys were trafficked to Senegal from The Gambia, Mali, Guinea-Bissau, and Guinea for forced begging by religious teachers. Senegalese women and girls were trafficked to neighboring countries, the Middle East, and Europe for domestic servitude and possibly for sexual exploitation. Women and girls from other West African countries, particularly Liberia, Ghana, Sierra Leone, and Nigeria may have been trafficked to Senegal for sexual exploitation, including for sex tourism.

The Government of Senegal maintained a steady commitment to rescuing and caring for victims, though law enforcement efforts.

The U.S. State Department's Office to Monitor and Combat Trafficking in Persons placed the country in "Tier 2" in 2023.

== Prosecution (2008) ==
The Government of Senegal demonstrated modest law enforcement efforts to combat trafficking during the last year. Senegal prohibits all forms of trafficking through its 2005 Law to Combat Trafficking in Persons and Related Practices and to Protect Victims. The law's prescribed penalties of five to 10 years' imprisonment for all forms of trafficking are sufficiently stringent and commensurate with penalties prescribed for rape. In December 2007, nine individuals, two of whom were truck drivers from Guinea-Bissau and one of whom was Senegalese, were arrested at the southern border for attempting to traffic 34 boys. The suspects are in jail awaiting trial. In 2007, a religious teacher was prosecuted and sentenced to four years' imprisonment for beating a talibe to death. The Ministry of Tourism activated a police unit to combat sex tourism in Dakar, though a similar unit established in Mbour is not yet operational. During the year, the Ministry of the Interior activated the Special Commissariat Against Sex Tourism - which it had established in 2005 - in Dakar and Mbour. The Ministry of the Interior, through its Bureau of Investigations, works closely with Interpol to monitor immigration and emigration patterns for evidence of trafficking. Senegalese police continued to work closely with Bissau-Guinean authorities to repatriate children trafficked for forced begging back to Guinea-Bissau.

== Protection (2008) ==
The Government of Senegal demonstrated solid efforts to protect trafficking victims over the last year. Senegal continued to operate the Ginndi Center, its shelter for destitute children, including trafficking victims. In its record keeping, the Center does not specifically track the number of trafficking victims it receives. However, the Family Ministry, which funds and operates the Center with help from international donors, has recently begun using an NGO-funded computerized database to track trafficking victims. Last year, the center received 917 destitute children, including trafficking victims. With international organization assistance, all of these children were reunited with their families in Senegal, Guinea-Bissau, Mali, and The Gambia. The government provided 77 of these children with vocational training and 329 with medical care. The government also continued to operate its free child protection hotline out of the Ginndi Center. The hotline received 66,823 calls last year. The government also sometimes refers victims to NGOs for care on an ad hoc basis. The government encourages victims to assist in trafficking investigations or prosecutions by permitting closed-door victim testimonies during trafficking prosecutions and by interviewing victims to gather evidence to prosecute traffickers. The government provides legal alternatives to the removal of foreign victims to countries where they may face hardship or retribution. Trafficking victims have the option of remaining temporarily or permanently in Senegal under the status of resident or refugee. Victims are not inappropriately incarcerated or fined for unlawful acts as a direct result of being trafficked.

== Prevention (2008) ==
The Government of Senegal made minimal efforts to raise awareness about trafficking during the reporting period. As part of its program against the worst forms of child labor, the Family Ministry conducted donor-funded workshops and roundtables in Mbour, Dakar, and other areas of the country to raise awareness about forced child begging, child domestic servitude, and prostitution of children. A magistrate at the High Commissary of Human Rights, the government's focal point agency to combat trafficking, holds monthly meetings with representatives from the Ministries of Justice, Tourism, Interior, Women, and Education to better disseminate and enforce the law prohibiting trafficking. The government took measures to reduce demand for commercial sex acts in Senegal by activating a tourism police unit and a special police commissariat to combat child sex tourism. The government did not take measures to ensure that its nationals who are deployed abroad as part of peacekeeping missions do not engage in or facilitate trafficking. The Family Ministry is working with a foreign donor to develop a new national action plan against trafficking.
