= Cottesloe Consultation =

- Date: December 14–17, 1960
- Location: Cottesloe, Johannesburg, South Africa
- Cause: Sharpeville massacre
- Organised by: World Council of Churches (WCC)
- Participants: All South African WCC member bodies
- Outcome: Cottesloe Statement

The Cottesloe Consultation was a conference held from December 7–14, 1960, in Cottesloe, a suburb of Johannesburg, South Africa. The immediate impetus for the consultation was the international public outcry against the Sharpeville massacre that had taken place the previous March. Prior to the consultation's convening, Hendrik Verwoerd, who was Prime Minister of South Africa at the time, called the consultation "an attempt by foreigners to meddle in the country's internal affairs". The consultation was sponsored by the World Council of Churches (WCC) and all of the WCC member bodies in South Africa sent ten delegates to participate in the discussion. One of the delegates was German theologian Wilhelm Niesel, author of Die Theologie Calvins. The consultation was organized by WCC's Robert S. Bilheimer.

== Anti-Discrimination and Suffrage ==
At the consultation, the member bodies were urged to push the government of South Africa towards greater inclusion of black people in political office. The delegates agreed on the adoption of the Cottesloe Statement, which rejected unjust discrimination in various forms and made several specific resolutions with respect to such issues as freedom of religion, migrant work, and due process.

=== Backlash ===
The boldest clause in the statement was the resolution that black residents of areas designated as "white" by apartheid legislation should be granted suffrage. The Dutch Reformed Church (DRC) in South Africa rejected the Cottesloe Statement as too theologically liberal, despite the fact that DRC theologians had been represented at the consultation and had agreed to the statement.
