= Robert S. Bilheimer =

Doctor Robert S. Bilheimer
- Born: September 28, 1917; Denver, Colorado
- Died: December 17, 2006 (aged 89); Canandaigua, New York
- Occupation: Theologian
- Notable work: What Must the Church Do? A Spirituality for the Long Haul; Breakthrough
- Movement: Ecumenism
- Children: Robert Bilheimer
- Theological work
- Language: English

Dr. Robert S. Bilheimer (September 28, 1917 – December 17, 2006) was an American Presbyterian theologian. In his 1947 book What Must the Church Do?, he used the phrase "New Reformation" to refer to the ecumenical movement that resulted from the 1910 World Missionary Conference, and this usage became commonplace thereafter. He was one of the co-founders of the World Council of Churches (WCC). He later gave credit for most of the founding of the organization to the laity and young people. From 1955 to 1958, he co-chaired a WCC international commission to prepare a document addressing the threat of nuclear warfare during the Cold War. As a WCC delegate, he prepared the Cottesloe Consultation, which took place in December 1960 and saw the WCC meet with representatives from the eight main Christian denominations in South Africa in order to address the issue of apartheid. He served as Associate General Secretary and Director of the Division of Studies of the WCC, executive director of the Institute for Ecumenical and Cultural Research, and Director of the International Affairs Program of the National Council of Churches. He wrote the 1984 book A Spirituality for the Long Haul: Biblical Risk and Moral Stand, in which he provides a biblical basis for resisting oppression. He also wrote the 1989 book Breakthrough: The Emergence of the Ecumenical Tradition, which was one of several books about ecumenism that were published by William B. Eerdmans Publishing Company in the late 20th century.
