= Antonio Maria Costa =

UN official (born 1941)

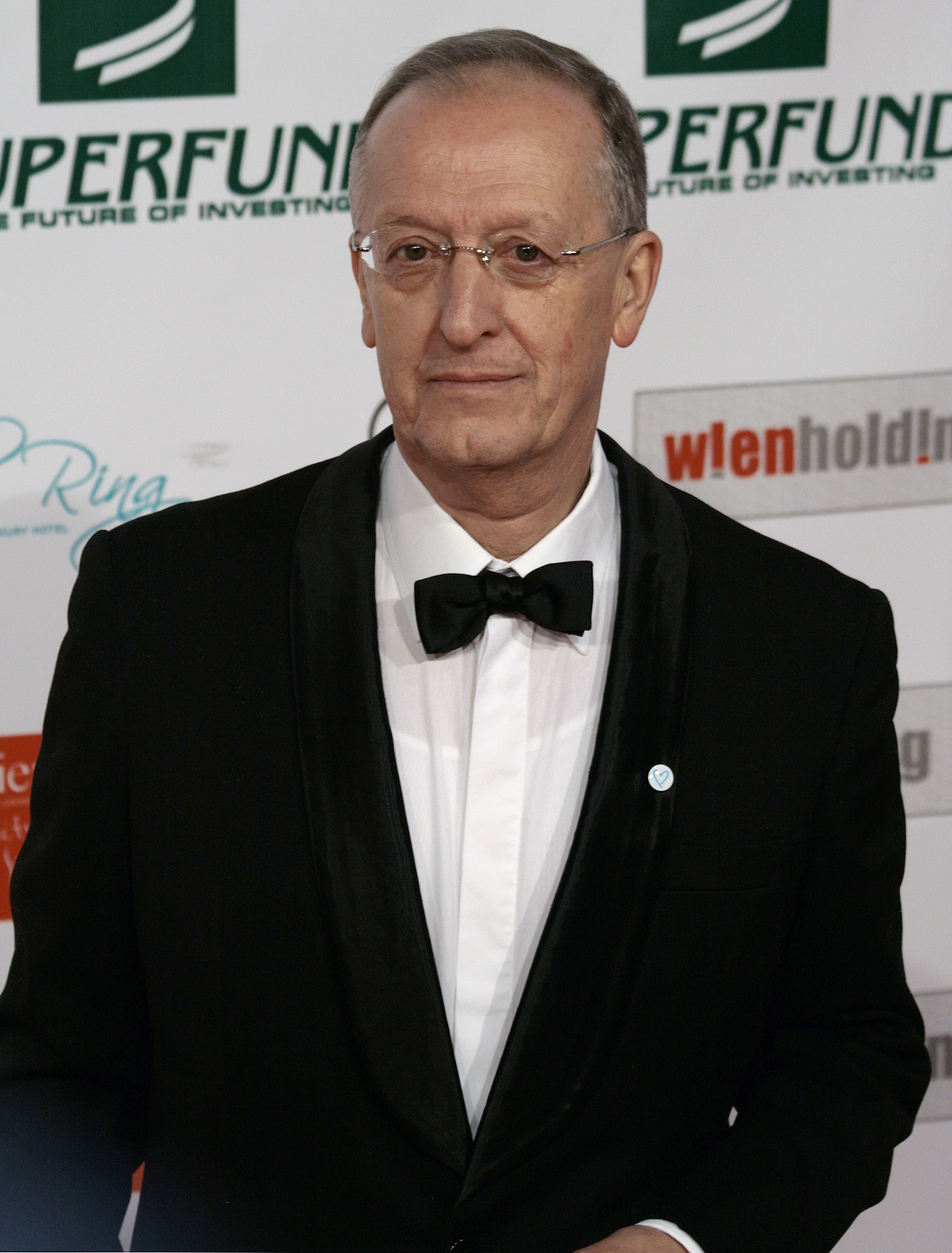
- Under-Secretary-General of the United Nations

Executive Director of the United Nations Office on Drugs and Crime (UNODC) and Director-General of the United Nations Office in Vienna (UNOV)
- In office May 2002 – July 2010

Secretary-General of the European Bank for Reconstruction and Development (EBRD)
- In office 1992–2002

Personal details
- Born: 16 June 1941 (age 85) Turin, Italy
- Education: University of Turin; Moscow State University; University of California at Berkeley

Antonio Maria Costa (born 16 June 1941) is an Italian economist. He lives in Vienna and Brussels.

From May 2002 to August 2010 Costa served as an Under-Secretary-General of the United Nations to the positions of executive director of the United Nations Office on Drugs and Crime (UNODC) and Director-General of the United Nations Office in Vienna (UNOV). Costa was the first to hold this double tenure for two consecutive 4-year mandates.

Before this, Costa was Secretary General of the European Bank for Reconstruction and Development (EBRD) from 1994 to 2002 and EU Director General for Economics and Finance (DGII) at the European Union from 1987 to 1992.

Costa is currently editor-in-chief of the Journal of Policy Modelling.

== Background ==
An Italian native, Costa was born on June 16, 1941. He holds a:

- Degree in political science from the University of Turin (1963);
- Degree in mathematical economics from the Moscow State University (1967); and
- Ph.D. in economics from the University of California, Berkeley (1971).

His career history is as follows:

- 1963 to 1964: Professor of Economics at the Moscow University (MGU, USSR) and at the Academy of Sciences of the USSR (Moscow)
- 1968 to 1970: Adjunct Professor of Economics, University of California at Berkeley (USA)
- 1969 to 1983: Senior economist in the United Nations Department of International Economics and Social Affairs.
- 1970 to 1976: Professor of Economics, the City University of New York (USA)
- 1976 to 1987: Professor of Economics, New York University (USA)
- 1983 to 1987: Under-Secretary-General at the Organisation for Economic Co-operation and Development (OECD).
- 1987 to 1992: Director-General for Economics and Finance at the European Commission.
- 1990 to 1994: Visiting Professor at the Free University of Brussels (ULB, Belgium)
- 1992 to 2002: Secretary-General of the European Bank for Reconstruction and Development (EBRD).
- 2002 to 2010: Executive Director of the United Nations Office on Drugs and Crime (UNODC) and Director-General of the United Nations Office at Vienna (UNOV).

== Tenure at UNODC ==
Costa served as executive director of the United Nations Office on Drugs and Crime (UNODC) and Director-General of The United Nations Office at Vienna (UNOV) for two consecutive periods from 2002 to 2008. On behalf of the Secretary General of the United Nations, Costa carried out the administrative and managerial responsibilities for the smooth functioning of the biggest UN campus in Europe, resulting in a massive renovation and a large scale expansion.

As Executive Director Costa was in charge of UNODC's drug control program, i.e. assisting countries to contain the drug problem as to supply (production) and demand (addiction), as well as fighting illicit trafficking.

The UNODC also runs a crime control program to assist countries to implement the UN Conventions against Transnational Organized Crime (UNTOC) and the UN Convention Against Corruption (UNCAC), as well as three protocols (against trafficking of human beings, smuggling of migrants and trading of illicit arms).

During his tenure, Costa focused his attention on integrating the activities of the Office into the peace, security and development agenda of the United Nations. He did this through an interrelated and interdisciplinary approach as well as through developing partnership with other international organizations.

The activities of the United Nations in the fields of drug control, transnational crime prevention and combating terrorism were expanded considerably, the UNODC being at the centre of these activities. In addition, the Office also acted as secretariat for several international conventions such as the United Nations Convention against Corruption (UNCAC) and its Convention against Transnational Organized Crime (UNCTOC) that entered into force in the last decade.

In June 2006, Costa criticised the decision on the part of the UK government to downgrade cannabis from a Class B drug to Class C. This policy decision was later reversed by the UK parliament which requested that Cannabis be scheduled to Class B within the UK Misuse of Drugs Act. Cost has underlined in his writing that the confusion surrounding the classification of cannabis may have had a negative impact on young people within the UK who may well have been confused themselves as to the legal position of the drug. He has emphasised to that the lack of leadership from governments in how they are tackling their drug problem can have a negative impact on the nature of the drug problem within those countries. In light of the obligations of signatories to the global drug control conventions he went further and stated that "it is fundamentally wrong for countries to make cannabis control dependent on which party is in government." After a brief period of declassification, Britain later reversed its policies and upgraded cannabis to a Class B drug again in 2009. In 2010 Antonio Maria Costa was awarded the Nils Bejerot prize in recognition of his international contribution to drugs policy and practice. This award is named after the person who many regard as the architect of the Swedish government's zero tolerance policy on drugs misuse.

In the ongoing debate regarding the science of psychoactive substances, Costa continues to support the global control of cannabis, the most widely used illicit drug in the world today, stating: "Cannabis is the most vulnerable point of the whole multilateral edifice." Citing more potent strains and increased "cannabis-related health damage", Mr. Costa argued that "the harmful characteristics of cannabis are no longer that different from those of other plant-based drugs such as cocaine and heroin."

In 2008, Costa criticized the culture of drug use among Western celebrities and pop stars, arguing that their drug use had dire consequences for production and trafficking countries in other regions of the world, such as West Africa.

Towards the end of 2008, Costa and the UNODC increased their rhetoric against piracy off of Somalia, urging that pirates be brought to justice and that they not be paid ransom by shippers.

As director of UNODC Costa has drawn attention to the role of major international banks in assisting organized crime in money laundering. He has pointed to evidence that during the financial crisis interbank loans were funded by money that originated from organized crime and drug trade, effectively identifying major banks as money-launderers for about $352 billion in proceeds.

On 12 July 2010, Costa's tenure at the UNODC ended when Secretary-General of the United Nations appointed Yuri Fedotov Executive Director of UNODC.

== Criticism ==
As Director General of the UN Office on Drugs and Organized Crime, Costa has drawn critical comment from a number of organisation and commentators who are opposed to the international drug conventions believing that these conventions limit individual signatory countries from experimenting with various forms of drugs regulation decriminalisation and legalisation. Antonio Maria-Costa has spoken publicly of his support for the Swedish drug policy of zero tolerance. Under his leadership the UNODC published the report Sweden's Successful Drug Policy: A Review of the Evidence.

Whilst Antonio Maria Costa has been criticised for emphasising the importance of enforcement in how individual countries tackle their drug problem in fact he has been a vocal supporter for the use of health service and drugs treatment, recognising that countries require a balanced approach to how they are tackling their drug problem combining elements of enforcement, treatment and prevention.

== Novel ==
Costa is the author of the novel The Checkmate Pendulum (2014), which draws on his experience from the EU Commission, the UN and his tenure at the European Bank of Reconstruction and Development.
