= The Cry of Reason =

1988 film

The Cry of Reason: Beyers Naude - An Afrikaner Speaks Out
- Directed by: Robert Bilheimer
- Produced by: Robert Bilheimer; Ronald Mix
- Cinematography: Ronald Mix
- Edited by: Tom McMurtry; William Tadler
- Production company: Worldwide Documentaries Inc.
- Release date: 1988
- Running time: 58 minutes
- Country: United States
- Language: English

The Cry of Reason: Beyers Naude – An Afrikaner Speaks Out is a 1988 American documentary film directed by Robert Bilheimer. Its subject is the theologian Beyers Naudé. It was nominated for an Academy Award for Best Documentary Feature.
