= Human trafficking in Italy =

Italy ratified the 2000 UN TIP Protocol in August 2006.

== Background in 2010 ==
In 2010 Italy was a destination and transit country for women, children, and men trafficked transnationally for the purposes of commercial sexual exploitation and forced labor. Women and children were trafficked mainly from Nigeria, Romania, Bulgaria, Moldova, Albania, and Ukraine but also from Russia, South America, North and East Africa, the Middle East, China, and Uzbekistan. Chinese men and women were trafficked to Italy for the purpose of forced labor. Roma children continued to be trafficked for the purposes of sexual exploitation and forced begging. Reportedly, an increasing number of victims were trafficked for labor, mostly in the agricultural sector. According to one NGO, 90 percent of foreign seasonal workers were unregistered and two-thirds are in Italy illegally, rendering them vulnerable to trafficking. The top five source countries for agricultural workers were Romania, Pakistan, Albania, and Ivory Coast. Traffickers reportedly were moving victims more frequently within Italy, often keeping victims in major cities for only a few months at a time, in an attempt to evade police detection.

In March 2010, 69 people in connection with the Russian Mafia were arrested in various European countries, including Italy. In June 2010, Italian and Romanian authorities cracked down on a human trafficking network that included over 150 women, including minors, that were being sexually exploited. 14 people were detained in various Romanian regions and 26 were arrested in Italy. Among the 57 people that were found to be involved in the network, the majority were Romanians, but among them were also Italians, an Albanian and an Egyptian.

The New York Times reported in September 2010, that Italian officials in Prato could account for an increasing amount of illegal Chinese immigrants who are buying out Italian businesses and changing the "made in Italy" image that is so well known. Organized crime is on the rise, including illegal fabric importation, human trafficking, prostitution, gambling and money laundering. Authorities raided over 154 Chinese-owned businesses in the first half of 2010, at the time there were over 3,000 registered Chinese-owned businesses. Police forces do not have the man-power in order to stay on top of the immigration problem. Several Italian Officers were arrested earlier that year for taking bribes in exchange for residence permits.

In December 2010, Health Rights Watch reported about the abuse upon migrants which were allowed by many governmental policies and protection gaps. Among those listed was Italy, who through the supply of boats and crews to the Libyan coastal patrols, was indirectly sending migrants, mostly sub-Saharan African, into Libyan detentions which are of degrading condition and inhuman. Libya and Italy created a deal in order to cut off the main sea route to Europe for the illegal African migrants, which in turn sent the majority of the boats to Israel, who recorded a 300% increase at the beginning of 2010.

== International response ==
The Government of Italy did not fully meet the minimum standards for the elimination of trafficking in 2022, but it made significant efforts to do so.

In 2023 the U.S. State Department's Office to Monitor and Combat Trafficking in Persons placed the country at Tier 2.

In 2023, the Organised Crime Index gave the country a score of 7 out of 10 for human trafficking, noting that most victims were moved to Italy from Nigeria and northern Africa.

The 2024 GRETA report noted that almost 15,000 possible victims had been identified since 2019 (mostly women); it also noted the government’s new national plan and identification procedures, as well as extra funding for victim support.

== Prosecution (2008) ==
The Government of Italy continued its strong law enforcement efforts in 2007. Italy prohibits all forms of trafficking in persons through its Measures Against Trafficking in People law of 2003, which prescribes penalties on conviction of between eight and twenty years' imprisonment. These penalties are considered sufficiently stringent and are comparable with those prescribed for forcible sexual assault. The government's 2006 legislation to expand its labor trafficking law and introduce new penalties for job recruiters remains in draft form.

In a major case in April 2007, the courts sentenced four Italians and three Romanian human traffickers to between three and 12 years' imprisonment after they were convicted for the forced prostitution and exploitation of 200 Roma children between 2004 and 2006. In June 2007, the government prosecuted eight other perpetrators on charges of sexually exploiting children by coercing them into performing sexual acts in exchange for small gifts. Government investigations resulting from the previously reported large-scale anti-trafficking crackdown, "Operation Spartacus", between October 2006 and January 2007, are reported to be still ongoing. In 2007 Italian prosecutors launched trafficking investigations against 1,202 individuals, prosecuted 80 trafficking cases, and the courts convicted 163 traffickers in. The average sentence was four years. The government reported that most traffickers remain in detention during the criminal proceedings. For sentences of more than two years, defendants are not eligible for suspended sentences. The government continued its prosecution of 19 traffickers from a 2006 case involving the trafficking of 113 Polish tomato pickers in Apulia who were exploited in forced labor conditions, and planned to begin to prosecute an additional four perpetrators in early 2008. After local Italian police were initially slow to respond, prosecutors and Carabinieri vigorously investigated allegations of official complicity when notified and found no evidence to support the allegations.

According to an NGO based in Genoa working with Nigerian victims of human trafficking, some government officials have been imprisoned for facilitating trafficking.

== Protection (2008-2010) ==
The Italian government sustained strong efforts to protect trafficking victims during the reporting period. Article 18 of the anti-trafficking law allows authorities to grant residence permits and provide protection and job training services to victims of trafficking, and during the reporting period the government expanded Article 18 benefits to labor trafficking victims. The government allocated $3.75 million in 2007 for an additional emergency assistance plan and approved 23 projects implemented by NGOs. During the reporting period, it earmarked approximately $9.75 million for 65 victim assistance projects, although the government did not provide data on the number of trafficking victims who benefited from these projects or the number who entered social protection programs. In 2007, NGOs, with government funding, provided literacy courses for 588 victims and vocational training for 313, helped 436 find temporary jobs and 907 find permanent jobs. In 2007, the Ministry of Interior issued 1,009 residence permits to victims who assisted in a law enforcement investigation. The government also ensured the responsible return of 62 foreign trafficking victims in 2007 by funding their repatriation and reintegration and providing money for resettlement in their home countries. During the reporting period, the government implemented systematic procedures for victim identification among vulnerable populations in Italy. Despite the government's efforts to identify all victims of trafficking, some, such as Nigerian women in commercial sexual exploitation, are still deported. Based on a 2006 independent commission report that its victim identification measures for immigrants arriving in boats from North Africa are not fully effective, the government reportedly improved its process for identifying trafficking victims and it now allows international organizations and NGOs to inspect detention facilities and to interview migrants. Victims who file complaints against traffickers usually do not face penalties for unlawful acts committed as a direct result of their being trafficked. In 2007, the government enacted guidelines for the identification of victims of forced labor and promoted four regional studies on victims of labor exploitation.

In 2008, 1,100 trafficking victims entered social protection programs, among them were 50 children and 100 men. The Ministry of Interior stated that 810 victims were granted six-month residency permits to which would be extended when they found employment or enrolled in a training program. Children had automatically received permits until they reached the age of 18. The national government and local authorities earmarked $12.7 million for victim assistance programs in 2009.

In January 2010, the race riots in Rosarno brought to light the increasing exploitation of immigrant labor within Italy's agriculture sector. Of the 1,000 African migrants, some possessed temporary residencies, others were granted asylum and the others were deported. If the authorities even identified them as trafficking victims is unclear, only 8 migrants had requested residence permits as trafficking victims.

== Prevention (2008-2010) ==
The Government of Italy continued to educate the Italian public about trafficking through its funding of NGO awareness efforts, and it initiated a new ad campaign in 2007 that included TV spots, internet banners, and bumper stickers in various languages. In March 2007, the Ministry of Interior established a committee designed to improve oversight and prosecution of trafficking and invited NGOs into the policy making process by including their membership on this committee. The Ministry of Interior is in the planning stage of a public awareness campaign, with several other countries, to reduce demand for commercial sex acts and raise awareness about human trafficking called project Pentametro. The Italian Ministry of Defense reported regularly organizes training sessions on human rights and trafficking for both civilians and military personnel who serve in international peacekeeping missions abroad. The government contributed funding to the NGO ECPAT, which conducts child sex tourism prevention activities in Italy. In February 2007, police arrested a University professor in Naples for committing child sex tourism offenses while in Thailand.

In 2009, the government sponsored an IMO implemented program which was to increase the capabilities of Nigerian NGO's and to prevent Nigerian trafficking victims. The NGO ECPAT estimates that in 2009, about 80,000 Italian men traveled to Kenya, Thailand, Brazil, Latin America and the Czech Republic for sex tourism each year. Although the government continued to implement programs to combat child sex tourism, they did not report any prosecutions in 2009.
