= Stone Canoe =

American magazine

- Executive Editor: Phil Memmer
- Categories: Literary magazine
- Frequency: Annual
- Publisher: The YMCA's Downtown Writers Center
- Founded: 2007
- Country: United States
- Based in: Syracuse, New York
- Language: English
- Website: www.syracuse.ymca.org/stone-canoe.html
- ISSN: 1934-9963
- OCLC: 76837112

Stone Canoe is a literary magazine published annually by The YMCA's Downtown Writers Center in Syracuse, New York ( "The DWC"). It publishes the work of writers and artists who are current or former residents of Upstate New York, which the journal's editors define as that portion of the state outside of New York City and Long Island. The magazine was established in 2007 by Robert Colley, and is currently edited by poet and DWC founder Philip Memmer. Each of the journal's major categories are edited by a panel of guest editors, which rotate annually.

== Annual Awards ==
Where funding allows, Stone Canoe has a series of annual awards for the best submissions by emerging writers and artists, selected by the editors. These awards include publication and an honorarium of $500.

== Reception ==
- Issue 1 won a Bronze Medal at the 2007 Independent Publisher's Book (IPPY) Awards, the 2007 Certificate of Excellence for the Mid-Atlantic Region from the UCEA, and a Gold Medal at the 2008 University Continuing Education Association.
- Issue 2 won a Silver Medal at the 2008 IPPY Awards.
- Issue 3 won a Silver Medal from UCEA.
- Issue 4 won a Silver Medal at the 2010 IPPY Awards and a Silver Medal from UCEA.
- Issue 6 won a Gold Medal at the 2012 IPPY Awards and a Gold Medal from UCEA.
- Issue 8 won a Silver Medal at the 2014 IPPY Awards.

== Name ==
Stone Canoe derives its name from a traditional Native American story from Upstate New York that dates back some 2000 years. The story itself concerns the arrival of the Great Peacemaker to the region. According to Iroquois tradition, the Great Peacemaker was the founder of the Haudenosaunee, commonly called the Iroquois Confederacy. As the legend goes, the Peacemaker came to the area by crossing Lake Ontario on a white stone canoe.
