= Robert Bilheimer =

American film director

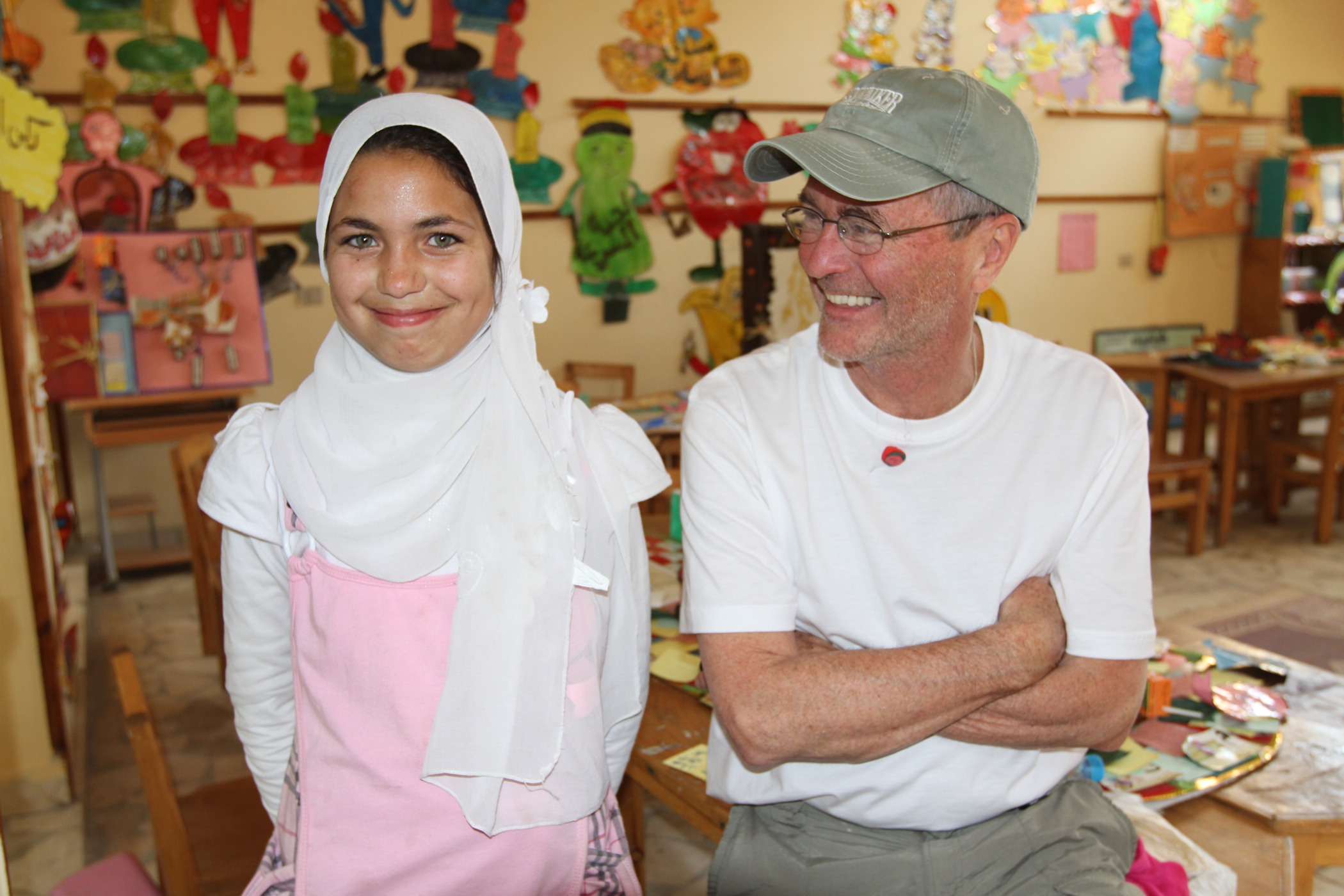
Robert Bilheimer with a girl in an Egyptian mixed-sex school during the filming of Not My Life

Robert Bilheimer is the American director of worldwide documentaries. He is the son of American Presbyterian theologian Robert S. Bilheimer. Bilheimer received an Academy Award nomination for his film The Cry of Reason. The executive director of the United Nations Office on Drugs and Crime, Antonio Maria Costa, asked Bilheimer to make the film human trafficking documentary film Not My Life, and later said that he chose Bilheimer because of his "solid reputation [for] addressing difficult topics... combining artistic talent, a philosophical view about development and a humanitarian sentiment about what to do about the issues."
