= Femicide in Turkey =

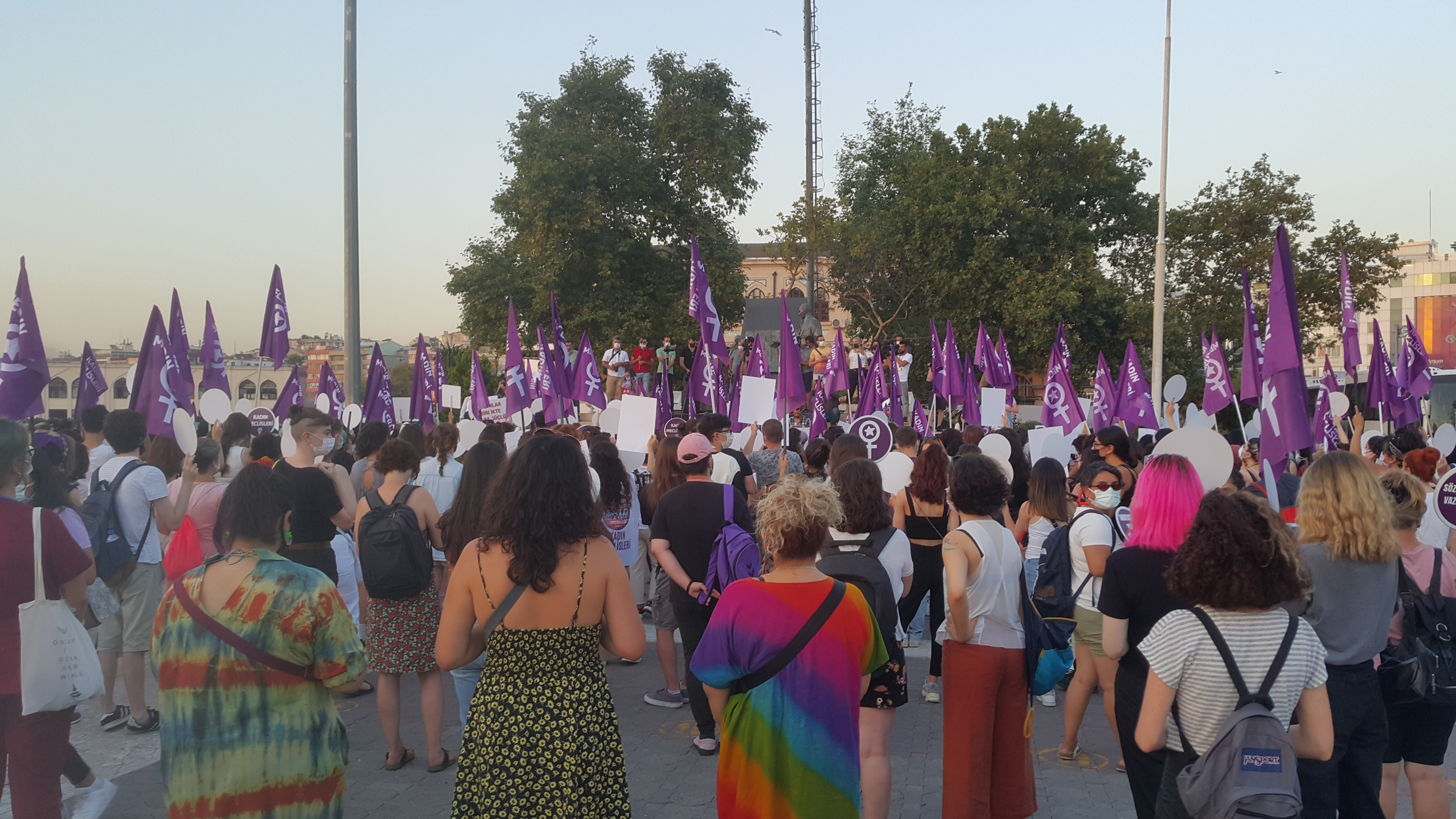
From the women's protest of the murder of Azra Gülendam Haytaoğlu, 2 August 2021, Kadıköy Square, Istanbul

Femicide in Turkey is one of the acts of violence against women in the country. The number of femicides has increased significantly in Turkey in the 2000s, compared to previous years. In 2019 alone, 474 women were killed. It was the year in which the most women were killed in the country in the last 10 years. According to the annual report of the "We Will Stop Femicide Platform", 300 women were murdered by men in 2020, and 171 women were found suspiciously dead. Between 2010 and 2019, the number of femicides decreased only in 2011, the year the Istanbul Convention was signed.

Among the main justifications put forward by criminals to normalize their crimes are women's demand for separation, honor, deception, jealousy, and more.

== Statistics ==
According to the reports of the "We Will Stop Femicide Platform", there were a total of 2,996 femicides between 2010 and 2020 in Turkey.

There are different data on femicide in Turkey published by official institutions and women's organizations. Since statistics on the number of women killed by their partners or family members in Turkey are not shared by relevant government agencies, official data is considered insufficient to reflect the extent of the femicide problem.

Civil organizations that started collecting data on femicide in Turkey are Anıt Sayaç, Bianet and We Will Stop Femicide Platform.

=== Femicide statistics according to some official data ===
The response of the then Minister of Justice, Sadullah Ergin, to a parliamentary question in 2009 is considered to be an important piece of official data on femicide in Turkey. In this response, the number of femicides committed in the country between 2002 and 2008 was explained as being 66 in 2002, 83 in 2003, 128 in 2004, 317 in 2005, 663 in 2006, 1011 in 2007, and 806 in 2008. The 14-fold increase in femicides from the years 2002 to 2008 was widely discussed in the media and among politicians.

In the answer given by the Ministry of Family and Social Policies to another parliamentary question asked in 2013, it was reported that 171 murders of women were committed in 2009, 177 in 2010, 163 in 2011 and 128 in the first 9 months of 2012.

In January 2021, Interior Minister Süleyman Soylu announced on his Twitter account that the number of women who lost their lives in femicides within the scope of Law No. 6284 was 353 in 2017, 279 in 2018, 336 in 2019 and 266 in 2020.

=== Femicide statistics by years ===
According to the data of the "We Will Stop Femicide Platform" (KCDP), 80 in 2008, 109 in 2009, 180 in 2010, 121 in 2011, 210 in 2012, 237 in 2013, 294 in 2014, 303 in 2015, 328 in 2016, 409 in 2017, 440 in 2018, and 474 in 2019, adding up to a total of 3,185 women were killed between 2008 and 2019.

According to the 2019 report of the "We Will Stop Femicide Platform", 115 of the 474 femicides committed in 2019 were recorded as suspicious and the culprits could not be found. According to the 2020 report, 300 women were killed by men in Turkey in 2020 and 171 women were found suspiciously dead.

The table shows the number of deaths by years and the data of the "We Will Stop Femicide Platform", shared on the website Anıt Sayaç, made for women who have died of violence in Turkey, is as follows:

Year	Number of deaths (Anıt Sayaç)	Number of deaths (KCDP)
2008	66	80
2009	125	109
2010	203	180
2011	130	121
2012	145	210
2013	231	237
2014	290	294
2015	293	303
2016	289	316
2017	351	409
2018	404	440
2019	422	474
2020	410	300
2021	433	280
2022	409	334
2023	418	315
2024	440	394

=== Femicide statistics by perpetrator ===
A study examining 1,260 femicide cases that took place between 2008 and 2018, shows that the husband of the murdered woman is at the top of the list of perpetrators in femicides (623). Murders by lovers (160) take the second place and ex-husband murders (94) take the third place. The fourth rank is "murders committed by an acquaintance" (88), with cases of theft and rape. This is followed by murders of relatives (49), murder by brother (48), murder by son (48), murder by father (38), and murder by a stranger (18).

Of the women murdered in 2019, 134 were by their spouses, 51 by their husbands, 29 by their relatives, 25 by their ex-husband, 25 by their son, neighbor or parents at the same school as their child, 8 by their former partner, 19 by acquaintances, 15 by their father, 13 by their brother, and 3 by people the women did not know.

Almost all of the women killed in Turkey in 2024 (%97.5) were murdered by men they knew. The most common perpetrators of femicides were husbands, accounting for 42% of the cases.

=== Femicide statistics by crime scene ===
According to the KCDP report, in 2019; 292 women were killed at home and 52 women were killed in the middle of the street. 9 in their cars, 6 in their workplace, 5 in a hotel, 5 in a park, 3 in a shop, 2 in an entertainment venue, 2 in a hospital, 1 in a cafe, 1 in a school, 1 was killed in another public place. 31 of the murdered women were killed or their bodies were found in water or near water. 32 of them were killed or found dead in land areas such as forests, pastures, picnic areas, gardens and fields. 3 women were killed or found dead in desolate places such as barns and abandoned buildings. It could not be determined where 29 women were killed. According to the KCDP 2024 statistics, 57% of women were killed in their homes.

=== Femicide statistics by killing methods ===
A study examining 1,260 murder cases out of more than 2,000 femicides that took place between 2008 and 2018, found that femicides were mostly committed with firearms (679), followed by cutting tools (404), strangulation (84), battering (64), and revealed that women were killed by torture (15).

Of the 474 women killed in 2019, 185 were killed with a firearm, 101 with a sharp object, 29 by drowning, 27 by being beaten, 19 by being thrown from a height, 6 by chemical medicine, and 6 by burning. How 101 of them were killed could not be determined. In the femicides committed in 2024, being killed by firearms ranked first in the statistics, accounting for 57%.

== Murders of women disguised as suicide ==
In 1999, contrary to the general trend in the world, female suicides were higher than male suicides in Turkey; has caused the phenomenon of suicide to take place more in the agenda of Turkey. In 1999, in Batman and its central districts, the average suicide rate in Turkey doubled in the first eight months of 2000 and 80.8% of those who committed suicide were women. As a result, many public institutions and non-governmental organizations felt the need to conduct research on women's suicides in the region. Most of the female suicides are caused by the pressure of honor; Some of the events that were reflected in the media as suicides were honor killings that were made to look like suicides; It has been claimed that some of them are suicides as a result of the pressure of custom.

Eastern Anatolia, Southeastern Anatolia and Black Sea regions, where the highest number of honor killings are committed in Turkey, are the regions where suicides are committed due to the pressure of honor and the incidents that are shown as suicides even though they are murders are concentrated.

== Famous femicides ==
Some of the many famous femicide cases:

- Elza Niego affair, 1927
- Murder of Serpil Yeşilyurt, 1998
- Murder of Şehriban Coşkunfırat, 1999
- Killing of Güldünya Tören, 2004
- Pippa Bacca, 2008
- Murder of Münevver Karabulut, 2009
- Murder of Ayşe Paşalı, 2010
- Murder of Esin Güneş, 2010
- Murder of Ferdane Çöl, 2011
- Murder of Serpil Erfındık, 2013
- Murder of Özgecan Aslan, 2015
- Killing of Dilek Doğan, 2015
- Murder of Şule Çet, 2018
- Murder of Fatma Şengül, 2019
- Killing of Emine Bulut, 2019
- Murder of Ceren Özdemir, 2019
- Murder of Seyhan Yüksekova, 2020
- Murder of Pınar Gültekin, 2020
- Murder of Deniz Poyraz, 2021
- Murder of Ayşegül Aydın, 2021
- Murder of Azra Gülendam Haytaoğlu, 2021
- Murder of Yasemin Ulutaş, 2022
- Murders of Ayşenur Halil and İkbal Uzuner, 2024
- Murder of Narin Güran, 2024

== Organizations ==
Some of the organizations fighting to end femicide in Turkey are as follows:

- We Will Stop Femicide Platform (Turkish: Kadın Cinayetlerini Durduracağız Platformu) : A platform established in 2010 with the foresight that femicide may become a social problem in Turkey, with the increase in femicides in the country in 2010 and the Münevver Karabulut case coming to the attention of the Turkish people in 2010.
- Femicide Platform: Femicide Platform, in short KCP, is a platform established in 2020 by women who want to put an end to the increasing femicide.
- Emergency Action Group Against Femicide: It is a platform established in July 2014 to demand urgent action against femicides.
- Şefkat-der: It is a Konya-based association, whose founder and chairman are men, and its members are volunteer women, and which produces works in the field of social aid with an understanding of religious-based philanthropy. The association has organized remarkable and controversial campaigns in the fight against femicide and violence against women.

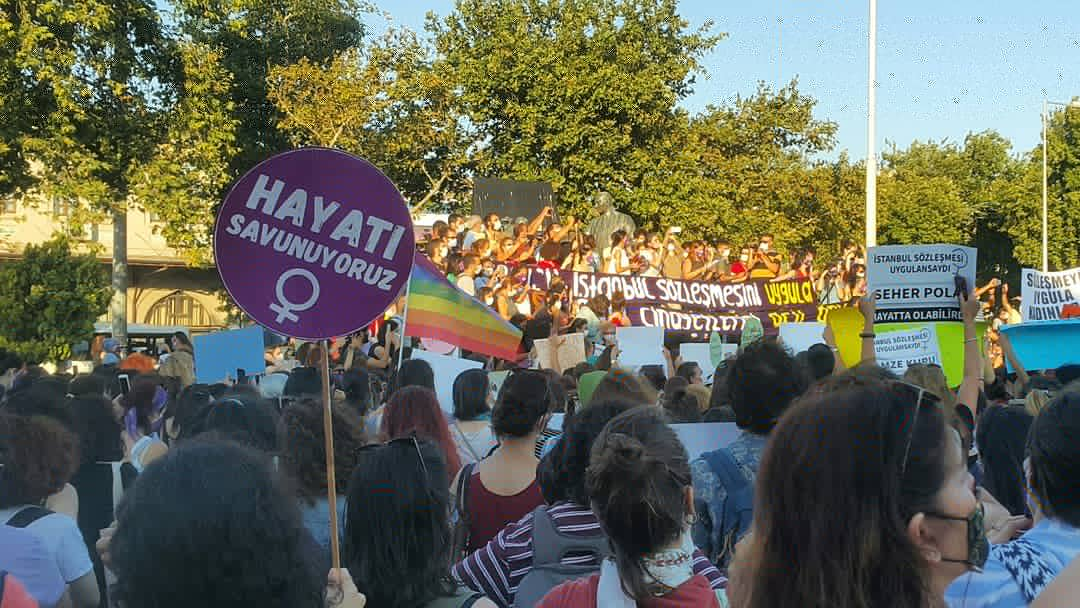
Protesting Turkey's withdrawal from the Istanbul Convention, 5 August 2020, Kadıköy, Istanbul

== Reflections ==
=== Literature ===
The problem of increasing femicide in Turkey has also been reflected in different genres of literature. Tomris Uyar, one of the important women's storytellers of the 1950s, is a writer who frequently deals with violence against women in his stories. The story named "Derin Kazın", which is about the murder of a prostitute called İkbal, is an example of the stories in which consists of femicide. Using post-modern narrative techniques, the author included Ikbal's murder in the newspaper news in the Sağlar story, emphasizing the sexist expressions of the murder news in the media.

After 1950, poets created a new understanding of poetry by focusing on femicide and violence against women in their poems. In their poems, they stated that ignoring a woman and making her unhappy are also equivalent to death. In one of the poets, Edip Cansever's poem entitled Watering the Flowers, femicide takes place in the following lines:

A woman in the Izmir bazaar

A woman in broad daylight
Who knows her night, who does not know her underclothes
Who knows her lips, who does not know how to be kissed
Having children but no children
A woman in broad daylight

Shot in three places with a pistol”-

— E. Cansever (Çiçekleri Sulasan), (Watering the Flowers)

In 2019, Hatice Meryem deals with the social background of femicides by considering socio-cultural and political foundations in her book, Where to Start Killing a Woman?. In a critique in Birikim, Onur Tüm commented on the book as "a well thought-out, perhaps the first text on femicide in Turkish literature".

Elçin Poyrazlar, in her novel The Mantolu Kadın (2018), tells the story of a woman who was subjected to domestic violence by her husband and the solidarity story of a woman who was forced into an unwanted marriage at a very young age, In her novel Ecel Çiçekleri (2021), she dealt with the issue of femicide by telling the story of a female commissioner investigating female murders.

The protagonist of Zeynep Kaçar's novel, Alone, published in 2021, turned into a character who avenges the murdered women by pretending to commit suicide by the order of the sheikh of the cult, and mentioned the names of women who were victims of femicides committed in Turkey in the past years and caused public outrage.

=== Contemporary art ===
Femicide has been dealt with especially by female artists in Turkey and has been the subject of contemporary art creations. Here are some examples of these artists and their work:

- In the exhibition titled "Dream and Truth", which brings together the works of 74 female artists between September 2011 and January 2012 at Istanbul Modern, İpek Duben's "Book of Love", which includes the news of femicide printed on steel records, is a reference to works that force the viewer to confront violence against women.
- Neriman Polat has produced various works that she describes as "a way of commemorating the murdered women and resisting injustice". The artist's work "Home Watch" (2013), in which she creates a hero who wants to avenge femicide and brings together different materials and narrative languages, is one of her works produced out of anger towards femicide. Polat's work "Bitter Coffee", includes writing the names of women killed by men in 2012 on the glass of a coffee shop on Kumbaracı slope in Istanbul.
- In 2018, 440 women were killed by male violence in Turkey and women were exposed to violence and oppression in all areas of life, and 20 female artists told the stories of women who were subjected to abuse and oppression in the exhibition "Let Women Live", organized in collaboration with the We Will Stop Femicide Platform in Istanbul.
- Hanging 440 pairs of women's shoes on a building wall in Kabataş, representing the 440 women killed in 2018, is a project designed by graphic designer Vahit Tuna.
- Şükran Üstün, opened an exhibition in Trabzon in 2020 with the portraits of 3,150 women in memory of the women who were murdered in the last 11 years, is one of the artists who try to make femicide visible.
- Opened in 2020, the installation exhibition "One Thousand and Four Hundred Percent: Women, Violence and the Media" is a story about the increase in the number of women who lost their lives due to male violence in the last seven years and the justification of this violence by both justice and the media.

=== Music ===
- In 2008, 13 female artists came together to support the "Domestic Violence Emergency Hotline" and released the album "Güldunya Songs". The album takes its name from the Güldunya Ceremony Murder, where the victim was killed by her brother. The album, in which the song "Güldunya", written and composed by Aylin Aslım and performed by Sezen Aksu, was recorded for Güldunya and was released on the World's End to Violence Against Women Day. The song "Women Exist" in the album was sung in chorus by female artists, including Nazan Öncel, Aylin Aslım, Aynur Doğan, Nilüfer, Zuhal Olcay, Sezen Aksu and Rojin.
- In 2019, the song "Susamam" included two parts about women's rights.
- In 2021, the music video for the song "Imdat" by Nazan Öncel was released on the artist's YouTube account on International Women's Day. Female artists such as Nükhet Duru, Gaye Su Akyol, Demet Evgar and Songül Öden took part in the clip.
- In 2021, a music video was produced by Sony Music Turkey about violence towards women and femicide.

== See also ==
- Conservatism in Turkey
- Femicide in Iran
- Honor killings in Turkey
- Domestic violence in Turkey
