= Child marriage in Turkey =

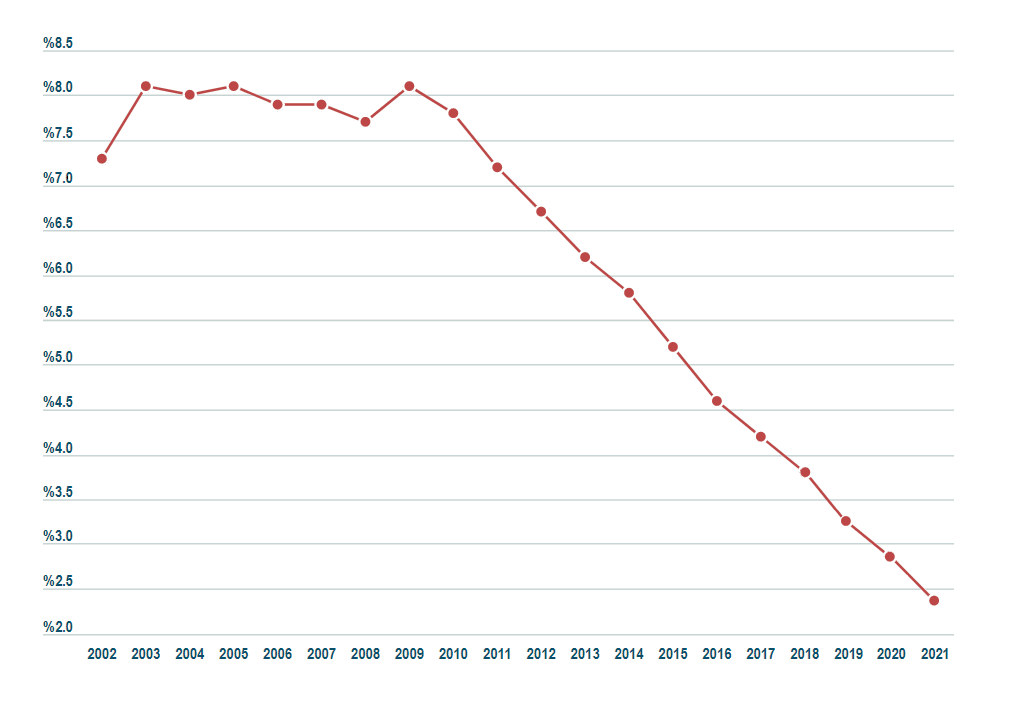
Child marriages as percentage of all marriages

Although illegal, child marriage in Turkey remains prevalent, especially among less educated families. It is a controversial political issue, and a topic of contention between liberal and conservative segments of society. Child marriage in Turkey dropped below 1%, although some cases still occur in the Kurdish-inhabited eastern parts of the country.

== Prevalence and distribution ==
One third of all marriages in Turkey are child marriages and one third of women get married under the age of 18. Between 2002 and 2014, 504,957 children officially got married at the ages of 16 and 17. Between 2010 and 2013, this official figure was 134,629. Child marriages affect girls very disproportionately, about 20 times as much as boys; around 129,000 of those involved in child marriages were girls, whilst only 6,000 were boys. Child marriages involving girls often involve girls that are much younger than boys in child marriages.

In 2012, around 20,000 families filed requests for permission to marry their daughters who were younger than 16. Between 2010 and 2013, there was a 94% increase in the number of families applying for permission to get their underage daughters (younger than 15) married. According to a 2013 Hacettepe University report supported by the Turkish government, 7.1% of all girls aged 15-19 were married. 26% of women between the ages of 15 and 49 reported that they were married as a child. The actual numbers of child marriages are estimated to be far higher than the official figures as many child marriages take place as unofficial religious marriages, without state authorization. This figure had decreased from 15.2% in 1998.

Child marriages take place in every region of Turkey. However, the provinces where the proportions are the greatest are concentrated in Eastern and Central Anatolia. According to the Gaziantep University research, the proportion of child marriages in the city of Şanlıurfa is around 60%, whereas that in İzmir, known for its cosmopolitanism, is around 16-17%. According to the Turkish Statistical Institute, the following provinces had the highest proportions of child marriage in 2013 (all between 35% and 42%): Yozgat, Nevşehir, Niğde, Kahramanmaraş, Kilis, Muş, Siirt, Bitlis, Van, Ağrı, Kars and Ardahan.

According to a 2018 Turkish report regarding child marriage in Turkey a total of 482,908 girls were married in the last 10 years. "In Turkey, 26 percent of females were married before the age of 18. Ten percent of them gave birth before the age of 18. Some 142,298 underage mothers were recorded in the last six years. Most of these children were married with religious ceremonies. A total of 440,000 underage girls have given birth since 2002. The number of women under 15 who gave birth after being exposed to sexual abuse was recorded as 15,937."

== Consequences ==
=== Education ===
According to a 2013 Gaziantep University research, 82% of child brides in Turkey are illiterate. Official reports indicated that 675 girls who were enrolled in primary schools had dropped out during the course of the year in 2009 due to marriage or betrothal, as opposed to 18 boys. 97.4% of students who discontinue their educational pursuits due to child marriage are girls.

=== Health and sexual violence ===
Between 2012 and 2014, 90,483 cases were filed in Turkey about the rape, sexual harassment or exploitation of underage girls. 17,000 girls were reported as missing between 2011 and 2014. The leading causes for the deaths of girls aged 15-19 in Turkey are childbirth and pregnancy complications. According to a 2013 Hacettepe research supported by the Turkish government, of women ages 20-49, 9.5% reportedly first gave birth before the age of 18 and 0.8% gave birth before the age of 15. In the first six months of 2011, 300 children gave birth in hospitals in Diyarbakır and Şanlurfa provinces alone.

== Legal framework ==
Child marriage is outlawed in Turkey and is punishable by imprisonment for the man who marries an underage girl and for third parties who plan the marriage. However, there is a discrepancy in the legal framework regarding child marriage: the minimum age for the marriage of girls is 15 according to the Turkish Penal Code, 17 (for both sexes) according to the Turkish Civil Code and 18 according to the Child Protection Act. Turkish Civil Code also maintained a minimum marriageable age of 15 for girls until a change in 2002.

According to activists, the legal framework is not the limiting factor in the struggle against child marriages.

In 2016, the governing Islamist conservative Justice and Development Party (AKP) sought to introduce legislation which would have made child rape no longer punishable if the perpetrator would offer to marry his victim; this was withdrawn after a public outcry against what was widely seen as an attempt of "legitimising rape and encouraging child marriage".

== See also ==
- Human rights in Turkey
- Human trafficking in Turkey
- Domestic violence in Turkey
- Sexual violence in Turkey
- Prostitution in Turkey
