= Arezu =

Arezu may refer to:

- Arezu, Iran
- Arezu Jahani-Asl, Iranian-born Kurdish and Canadian neurobiologist and researcher
- Shooting of Arezu Badri, Iranian woman paralyzed by Iranian security forces in July 2024

== See also ==
- Abdulghafour Arezou (born 1962), Afghani writer and poet
