= Domestic violence in Turkey =

Domestic violence in Turkey is an ongoing and increasing problem in the country. In 2013 a Hurriyet Daily News poll found that 34% of Turkish men think violence against women is occasionally necessary, and 28% say that violence can be used against women. According to data collected by We Will Stop Femicide Platform (KCDP) in Turkey, the number of femicides had increased from 80 to 280 between the years of 2008 and 2021. In the same report it is stated that 195 of the femicides that took place in 2021 were committed by the woman's spouse, ex-spouse, partner or ex-partner, and 46 of the femicides were committed by a family member or relative.

On March 8, 2012, the Turkish government adopted a domestic violence law to protect women. This law, also known as Law No. 6284, was proposed by female parliamentarians and mainly built on the Istanbul Convention that was opened to signature in 2011 and signed by the European Union and 45 countries as of 2019. Turkey was first country to sign the convention in 2011 and brought it into effect in 2014. However, the Turkish Government announced withdrawal from the Istanbul Convention in March, 2021. Additionally, a national acton plan to combat violence against women was introduced by the Ministry of Family and Social Policy of the Turkish Republic for the period between 2016 and 2020. This action plan had five main objectives. These objectives were making legislative arrangements, raising awareness and transforming the mentality, providing protective and preventative services for the victims of violence, regulating and implementing health services, and providing cooperation between institutions and policies.

In the wake of the Murder of Ozgecan Aslan, protests calling for justice and more powerful laws to protect women occurred nationwide. Afterwards, thousands of Turkish women shared their experiences of violence and harassment. Recently, the Murder of Pınar Gültekin sparked similar outcry and nationwide outrage in the country.

Patriarchal beliefs are considered a reason why Turkey has high occurrence of domestic violence. Honor killing is still prevalent in Turkey. About 40 percent of Turkish women have suffered domestic violence at some point in their lives, exceeding rates in Europe and the US. The 2021 Global Gender Gap Report ranked Turkey 133rd out of 156 countries.

A 2020 study investigated the relationship between femicide and economic development in Turkey. Using data from the 2010-2017 period, it was found that "whether economic development reduces femicide depends on other factors: in poorer provinces, there is a strong positive correlation between women's murders and equality in education and divorce rates, but in richer provinces, these associations are significantly weaker." It concluded that "these results are consistent with the idea that economic development may not reduce women's murders by itself, but it can mitigate the effects of male backlash against women who challenge the status quo."

The COVID-19 pandemic also had a negative impact on the frequency of domestic violence in Turkey. Before the pandemic the rate of women who reported domestic violence or abuse was 36%. With COVID-19, this number has increased to 38.2%. Although the Ministry of Interior stated that cases of domestic violence decreased by 7% during the pandemic, research conducted by Hacettepe University Institute of Population Studies indicated that 14% of participants perceived an increase in domestic violence since the COVID-19 pandemic started. The same research indicated that the majority of participants, 72%, knew where and how to seek help if they were subjected to domestic violence.

Domestic violence is not limited to physical abuse, and does not solely affect women. It also involves emotional and economical abuse, and the prevention of victims from accessing their basic human rights. Children can also be victims of domestic abuse. According to the National Research on Violence against Women from 2014, one third of girls in Turkey are not allowed to go to school, and 11% of women are prevented from going to work by their families.

Women's Associations, Feminist Collectives, and NGOs have been working to raise awareness against domestic violence, providing legal help, finding shelter, and helping victims of domestic violence to become financially independent. Additionally, there is a 24/7 social support hotline available by calling (183) that is intended to provide immediate help to victims of domestic violence or sexual abuse.

== Murder of Pınar Gültekin ==
Pınar Gültekin was found murdered in the Menteşe district of Muğla Province in July 2020. She had been strangled and her body burned in a barrel that, according to the killer was used to burn garbage. The accused, a 32-year old nightclub owner named Cemal Metin Avci, told authorities that he has murdered Gültekin in a "jealous frenzy" after she said she did not want to be with him.

== See also ==
- Conservatism in Turkey
- Honor killings in Turkey
- Women's Rights in Turkey
- Crime in Turkey
- Child marriage in Turkey
- Islam and Domestic Violence
- Prostitution in Turkey
- Human trafficking in Turkey
