= Shooting of Arezu Badri =

Arezu Badri (آرزو بدری) was a 31-year-old Iranian citizen who was shot by agents of the Law Enforcement Command of the Islamic Republic of Iran on the evening of 23 July 2024 in the city of Nur, Mazandaran, allegedly for not observing the country's mandatory hijab laws. She suffered a spinal cord injury. Badri is a mother of two.

== Incident ==
on 23 July 2024 (2 Mordad 1403), police officers opened fire on Arezu Badri, whose vehicle was reportedly listed for seizure due to hijab violations. The police attempted to arrest Badri and fired at her car. One of the bullets struck her, and she was transferred in critical condition to Imam Khomeini Hospital in Nur.

The following day, Badri was transferred to the emergency unit of Imam Khomeini Hospital in Sari. Doctors confirmed a spinal injury from the gunshot. She remains in a coma and under intensive care. After a week, she was moved to Valiasr Hospital in Tehran, where she remains under heavy security. Only close family members are allowed to briefly visit her without phones or cameras.

The human rights organization Hengaw reported on 15 August (25 Mordad) that Badri's physical condition had worsened, and her family was under pressure to repeat the government's version of the events and make a forced televised confession.

=== Police confirmation of the shooting ===
On 23 July (2 Mordad), the police commander of Nur stated that "ignoring police orders to stop led officers to open fire, in accordance with the use-of-force law."

On 10 August (20 Mordad), the Mazandaran provincial police issued a statement confirming Badri was shot and hospitalized in Nur County. Her car, a Pride 111, was stopped at 23:00 on 21 July (1 Mordad)"according to the firearm use regulations." The police blamed Badri herself for fleeing, not the officers. The head of the Judicial Organization of the Armed Forces announced a temporary arrest warrant for the "shooter" of Arezu Badri.

== Paralysis ==
On 27 December (7 Dey 1403), BBC Persian reported, quoting "an informed source", that doctors confirmed Badri is paralyzed from the waist down. BBC also reported that security agents had pressured her family into signing consent by threatening arrest or offering money.

=== Reactions ===
- On 27 December (7 Dey), journalist Masih Alinejad described the incident as an example of the systematic oppression of women by the Islamic Republic of Iran, calling it an instance of Gender apartheid.
- On 28 December (8 Dey), legal researcher Pegah Banihashem told Iran International that police threatened Badri's family, saying that if they spoke publicly, hospital expenses (allegedly very high) would not be covered, and cooperation would cease.

== See also ==
- Femicide in Iran
