= ChallengeAccepted =

Instagram tagged challenge, awareness campaign

#ChallengeAccepted, also known as the Challenge Accepted campaign, is an Instagram tagged challenge as well as an awareness campaign on empowering women involving sharing posts of black-and-white selfies. The Instagram challenge was launched alongside another hashtag campaign #WomenSupportingWomen with the core objective of empowering and encouraging women to share the black-and-white photographs and selfies of themselves on their respective Instagram accounts.

The campaign became originally viral in social media in 2016 with the intention of spreading positivity to tackle cancer and for cancer awareness.

== Campaign ==
The challenge later became popular in July 2020 triggered by the aftermath impact of the global George Floyd protests and was launched again to spread positivity amid the COVID-19 pandemic. The sources revealed that it is unclear how and where the 2020 campaign began originally; according to The New York Times, women in Turkey were claimed to be instrumental in bringing this campaign to wide global attention following the continuous harassment faced by Turkish women. In July 2020, protests broke out in Turkey after a university student called Pınar Gültekin was strangled, burnt and murdered by her ex-boyfriend.

As of 28 July 2020, the hashtag #ChallengeAccepted was used on Instagram over 4.5 million times. The purpose of the campaign is also to strengthen the female friendships and sisterhood by showing a way of appreciation and acknowledgment among each and every woman. Women were noticed to have been nominating other women in the platform privately directly through their DMs to post and share black and white selfies.

Popular celebrities like Evan Rachel Wood, Ivanka Trump, Khloe Kardashian, Kerry Washington and Paris Hilton also came out in support for the initiative.
