= Human trafficking in Turkey =

External videos
- Secrets Of The Multi-Billion Dollar Human Trafficking Industry - Sex Slaves - Crime Documentary

Turkey ratified the 2000 UN TIP Protocol in March 2003.

In 2007 the country was a top destination for victims of human trafficking, according to a report produced by the UNDOC. Source countries for identified victims of trafficking in 2008 included Turkmenistan, Uzbekistan, Moldova, Kyrgyzstan, Russia, Georgia, Ukraine, Azerbaijan, Romania, Kazakhstan, Belarus, Bulgaria, Indonesia, and Morocco. Notably, Russian organized crime syndicates engage in trafficking of women for prostitution, and East European women have turned up in many European countries, including Turkey.

The United States Department of State's Office to Monitor and Combat Trafficking in Persons placed the country in "Tier 2" in 2017 and 2023.

The 2019 GRETA report noted that most victims were returned to their home countries after 30 days, leading to a low conviction rate in the courts.

In 2023, the Organised Crime Index gave the country a score of 8 out of 10 for human trafficking, noting that state officials have a substantial involvement in carrying out this crime.

Turkey is the country with the greatest rate of modern slavery in the entirety of Europe and Central Asia. A national plan against the phenomenon was formed in 2009 and has since not been updated.

== Prosecution (2008) ==
The Government of Turkey demonstrated strong anti-trafficking law enforcement and prosecutorial efforts during the reporting period. Article 80 of the Penal Code prohibits trafficking for both sexual exploitation and forced labor, and prescribes penalties of 10 to 15 years imprisonment, which are sufficiently stringent and commensurate with prescribed penalties for other grave crimes, such as sexual assault.

The government reported convicting four traffickers during 2007 under its recently amended Article 80, but most prosecutions—initiated before the Article 80 amendment—continued under Article 227, the previous primary anti-trafficking statute. In addition to the four Article 80 convictions, the government, in 2007, prosecuted 160 suspects and convicted 121 trafficking offenders, a dramatic increase from the 36 convicted in 2006. Penalties imposed on traffickers convicted under Article 227 averaged three years’ imprisonment and included fines, some of them substantial. Thirty-two convicted traffickers received jail sentences of over four years. Under Turkish law, a jail term of two years or less can be reduced to probation; out of the 121 convictions, 26 were sentenced to two years or less. Eighteen traffickers convicted under other criminal statutes received fines and prison terms ranging from 10 months to four years and two months. While some improvements have been made, the Government of Turkey should continue to expand law enforcement cooperation and seek opportunities to improve judicial cooperation with source countries.

According to a few media reports in 2007, a limited number of public servants were arrested for crimes related to trafficking. The Government of Turkey reported that, between 2004 and 2007, 32 public officials were subject to judicial action for assisting traffickers, mediating prostitution, or accepting bribes. In 2007, the government relieved a Court of Appeals Judge of his duties for aiding traffickers; the prosecution is ongoing. The government continued an investigation involving a prison warden who was arrested and jailed in February 2007 for misuse of authority and accepting bribes that facilitated trafficking. A judicial committee recommended that she be expelled from public duty.

== Protection (2008) ==
The government continued its victim assistance efforts; however international donors stepped in to help remedy a funding shortfall for one trafficking shelter during the reporting period. Although there was no interruption in core services, a funding shortfall forced one shelter to forego staff salaries and divert other resources in order to finance these core services. A lack of consistent and guaranteed funding for Turkey’s trafficking shelters weakened the government’s overall protection efforts in 2007. The government has reported that it is focused on finding a long-term financial solution to this problem. NGO-run shelters provided care to 109 trafficking victims in 2007. In 2007, the government identified a total of 148 trafficking victims; the International Organization for Migration (IOM) assisted 118 of these victims. The remaining victims rejected the IOM referral mechanism and chose to return immediately to their countries, with their safe return guaranteed by the government. Four minor victims not formally referred to IOM for assistance were nonetheless assisted by the shelters and their welfare ensured by the Prime Ministry Social Services and Orphanages Directorate. The government encourages victims to participate in trafficking investigations and prosecutions, offers them free legal assistance, and offers legal alternatives to their removal to countries where they would face retribution or hardship. Foreign victims may apply for humanitarian visas and remain in Turkey up to six months with the option to extend for an additional six months; the government issued three humanitarian visas for victims in 2007.

The government does not punish identified victims for crimes committed as a result of being trafficked. The alignment with legislation is crucial for coordinating and regulating international modern slave trafficking. International irregular migration continues to rise in Turkey. Compliance with international commitments made by the surrounding countries of Turkey regarding smuggling will help to prevent organized crime. As increased globalization leads to more globalization of irregular migration, the prevention implies the promotion of cooperation, coordination and the strengthening of legal migration channels. The government took steps to ensure the responsible and secure repatriation of trafficking victims by following specific exit procedures and contacting governments about their documentation and notifying them of subsequent repatriation.

Turkey is an important destination for Armenian victims trafficked for sexual exploitation purposes, according to a 2007 joint study, “Republic of Armenia Law Enforcement Anti-Trafficking Training Needs Assessment,” by the Organization for Security and Co-operation in Europe (OSCE), International Labour Organization (ILO), United Nations Development Programme (UNDP), and International Centre for Migration Policy Development (ICMPD), as well as a 2007 OSCE assessment, “Trafficking in Human Beings in the Republic of Armenia,” though comprehensive statistics are difficult to obtain. The Government of Turkey did not report identifying any victims from Armenia in 2007, but Armenian victims have been identified and assisted in previous reporting periods.

== Prevention (2008) ==
The government increased its prevention efforts in 2007. The government’s interagency task force met more frequently and developed a new National Action Plan, currently awaiting formal adoption. The government signaled that it will take over funding and operation of the “157” anti-trafficking hotline from IOM. This hotline became operational for international calls in 2007, and 28 victims were rescued through its use during the reporting period. The Jandarma (Gendarmerie) published a guidebook and distributed 3,280 copies to educate officers to identify trafficking, and national police distributed 1,000 copies of a similar guide to its units in 2007. Authorities continued to distribute small passport inserts to travelers entering the country at designated ports-of-entry and Turkish embassies provided trafficking awareness inserts to visa applicants in source countries, although the extent to which this method of alerting potential victims is effective is questionable, given that many source country nationals do not require a visa to enter Turkey.

In 2007, the government published its first annual report on combating human trafficking in Turkey. Turkey’s NATO Partnership for Peace (PFP) training center hosted anti-trafficking training for Turkish and other NATO and PFP country personnel. The center also hosts annual anti-trafficking training for Turkish units assigned to peacekeeping operations.

== See also ==
- Crime in Turkey
- Human rights in Turkey
- Human trafficking in Europe
- Women in Turkey
- Prostitution in Turkey
- Slavery in the Ottoman Empire
