= Murders of Ayşenur Halil and İkbal Uzuner =

2024 murders of two women in Istanbul

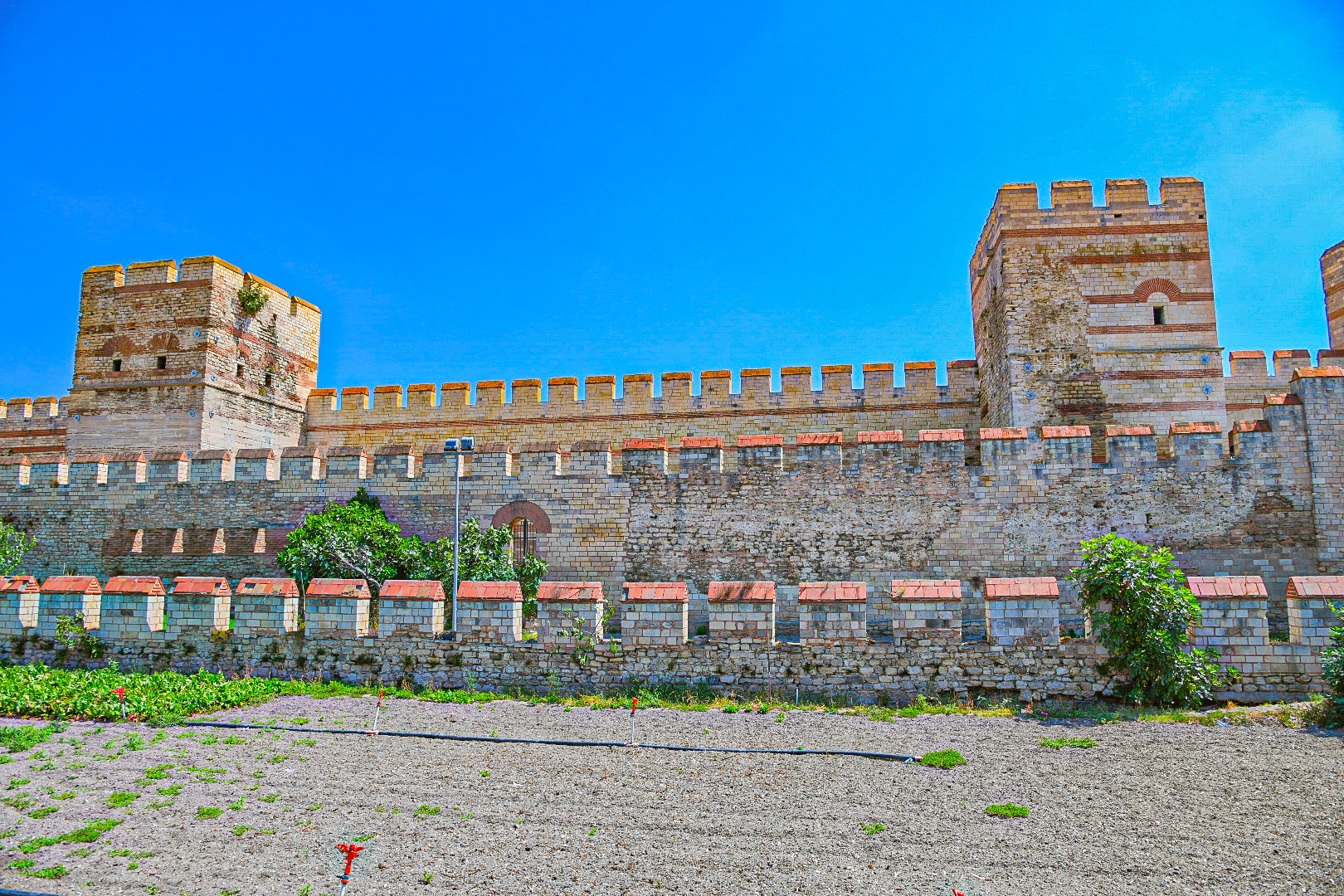
- The Walls of Constantinople, the location of the murder
- Location: Istanbul, Turkey
- Date: 4 October, 2024
- Attack type: Murder-suicide, femicide
- Weapon: Knives
- Deaths: 3 (including the perpetrator)
- Perpetrator: Semih Çelik
- Motive: Unknown

Ayşenur Halil and İkbal Uzuner (both aged 19) were murdered by Semih Çelik (19) within a half hour of each other on 4 October 2024 in Istanbul, Türkiye. The public murder–suicide, during which Çelik threw İkbal Uzuner's severed head off the Walls of Constantinople in front of her mother before committing suicide by jumping, sparked protests about femicide in Türkiye.

== Background ==
Semih Çelik, a 19-year-old who worked as a butcher, had been treated in a mental hospital five times in 2024 due to psychiatric illnesses. He had been reported missing twice, and had attempted suicide once. He had no prior criminal record. A detailed search of his home uncovered a sketch drawing resembling the dismembered body of İkbal Uzuner. According to a statement by his father, Adem Çelik, his son was Uzuner's classmate and had been receiving treatment in a mental hospital due to his psychiatric problems.

== Incident ==
Semih Çelik was alone at home in Eyüpsultan as his sister was out of town for university. He first invited Ayşenur Halil (allegedly his girlfriend) to his house. There, he killed her by cutting off her tongue (allegedly) and decapitating her. He then informed the police that a murder had occurred at his house and fled. Half an hour later, he met İkbal Uzuner in Fatih, took her to the Walls of Constantinople, and killed her there. He then dismembered her body and threw her head off the city wall. Afterwards, Çelik committed suicide by wrapping a rope around his neck and jumping from the walls.

İkbal Uzuner was buried on 5 October 2024 with Istanbul Governor Davut Gül and Fatih Mayor Mehmet Ergün Turan in attendance at the funeral. On the same day, Ayşenur Halil was buried after the funeral prayer at Pazariçi Sadet Mosque.

Semih Çelik's funeral was cancelled for security reasons and was buried at Kilyos Cemetery with only three people participating. Police investigations at Çelik's home discovered objects and cross symbols associated with Christianity and satanism.

== Aftermath ==
After the murder, an investigation was launched and statements were taken from the families of Semih, İkbal and Ayşenur. Semih Çelik's mother, Hafize Çelik, stated that her son was sick, and that she took him to the doctors and also warned Uzuner's family about the situation. She told Uzuner's family that they had to go into hiding to prevent her son from harming her. She said that her son and İkbal were going to commit suicide together, but İkbal later changed her mind and she constantly called him after. She added in her statement that Semih had stabbed himself in the heart. She claimed that İkbal's family did not take the necessary precautions.

Semih Çelik's father, Adem, stated that his son wanted to kill himself as well. He said that his son's teacher called him during his high school years and told him that his son should stay away from a friend at school. He added that Semih spent a lot of time on the computer Adem had bought for him, and that when his family entered his room, he panicked and quickly turned it off, as there was many disturbing pictures and notes that were psychotic and immoral.

Adem added that he couldn't find out what he was doing on the computer as his files were encrypted, and that his son did not want to study and graduated from high school externally. Çelik's mother also said that her son encouraged her daughter to commit suicide, and that strange drawings resembling the devil were in his room. When she asked about the drawings, her son responded with something along the lines of "You wouldn't understand, our mindsets are different," that he was a butcher and used drugs.

It is confirmed that Semih Çelik had started a relationship with Ayşenur Halil, who was identified as a friend from the high school he had dropped out of. Halil had visited Çelik's house, and they had spent time together. Semih called his father on the day of the incident, and said that Ayşenur was in his room and told him that he should not come home. When his father, Adem, went home, he found Ayşenur's body in his bed with her neck bleeding from the slit cut by Çelik with one of his butchering knives.

Adem also stated that Semih asked his father questions about death at home, had imaginary delusions, and kept many knives in his room. He added that he was Muslim before he was 16, and questioned many things about the world, including his religion. He left Islam shortly after. He also started to question existentially with the COVID-19 pandemic. Semih's guidance counselor told Adem that he had a talent for programming, so he bought him a computer.

It was determined upon examination of Çelik's phone that he had contact with people who identified themselves as Turkish incels. Following the murder, provocative and supportive posts were made by incel groups. Upon this, the chief public prosecutor's offices took action and detained the suspects. Then, on October 9, 2024, Discord was blocked for the 8 million registered Turkish users on the app. They are still banned to this day.

== Reactions ==
CHP Chairman Özgür Özel, İYİ Party Chairman Müsavat Dervişoğlu, Ankara Mayor Mansur Yavaş, TİP Chairman Erkan Baş, and Deputy Speaker of the Grand National Assembly Gülizar Biçer Karaca posted their reactions to the murder on Twitter.

The killings stirred public outrage over violence against women and femicide in the country, with groups organising protests, calling for the reinstatement of the Istanbul Convention and the effective implementation of Law 6284.
