= Elza Niego affair =

1927 murder case and subsequent political incident in Turkey

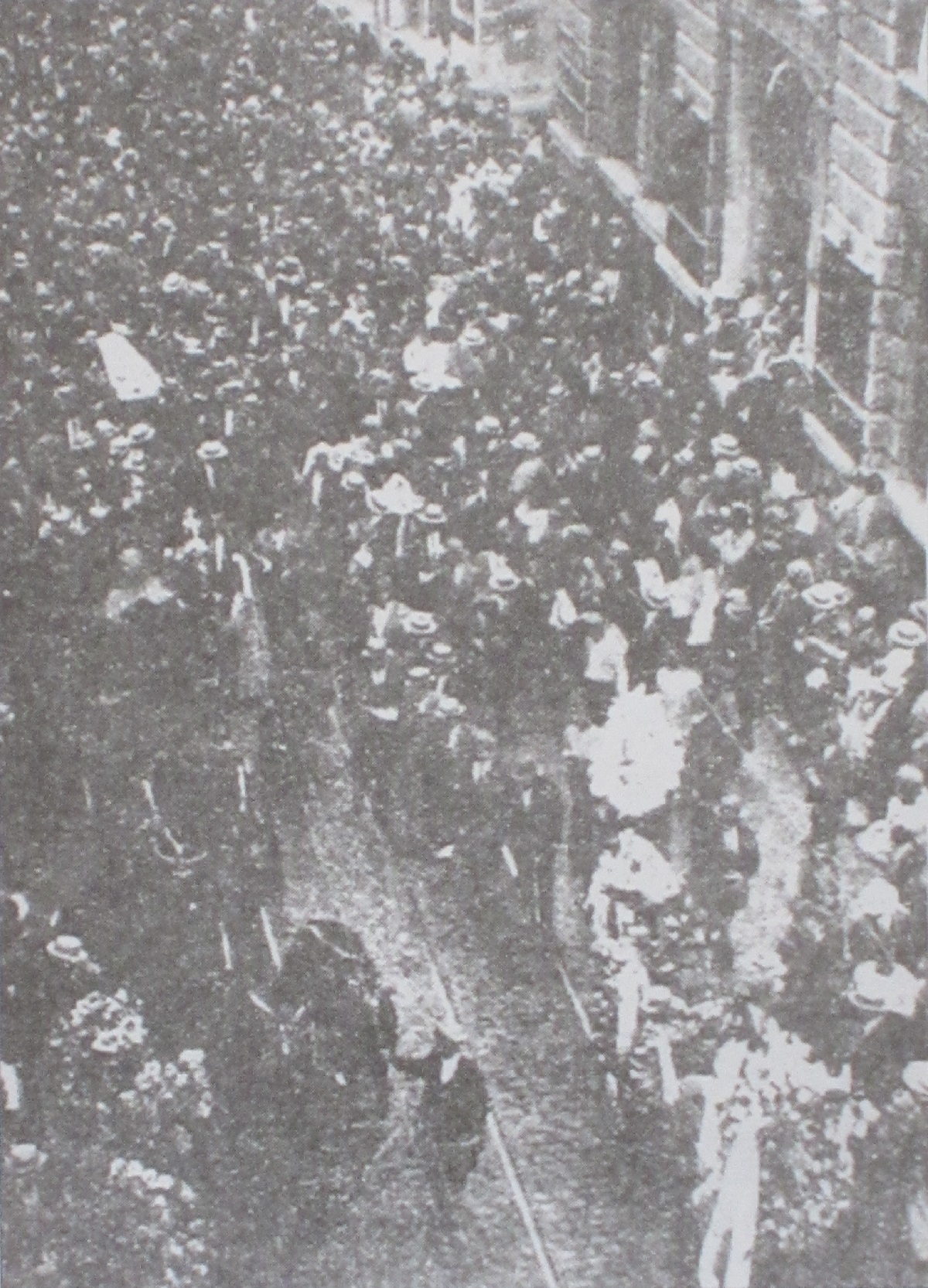
Funeral march of Elza Niego, August 1927

The murder of Elza Niego (Turkish: Elza Niyego, Hebrew: אלזה נייגו) occurred on 17 August 1927 in Istanbul, Turkey. Niego, a 20-year-old Jewish woman, was killed by Osman Ratıp Bey, a former Ottoman official. The murder and the subsequent funeral, which evolved into a mass demonstration against the lack of state protection, sparked a significant anti-Jewish reaction in the Turkish press and led to criminal proceedings against Jewish protestors for "insulting Turkishness." The event is considered a pivotal moment in the history of the Jewish minority in the early Turkish Republic, contributing to the intensification of the "Citizen, speak Turkish!" campaign.

== Murder ==
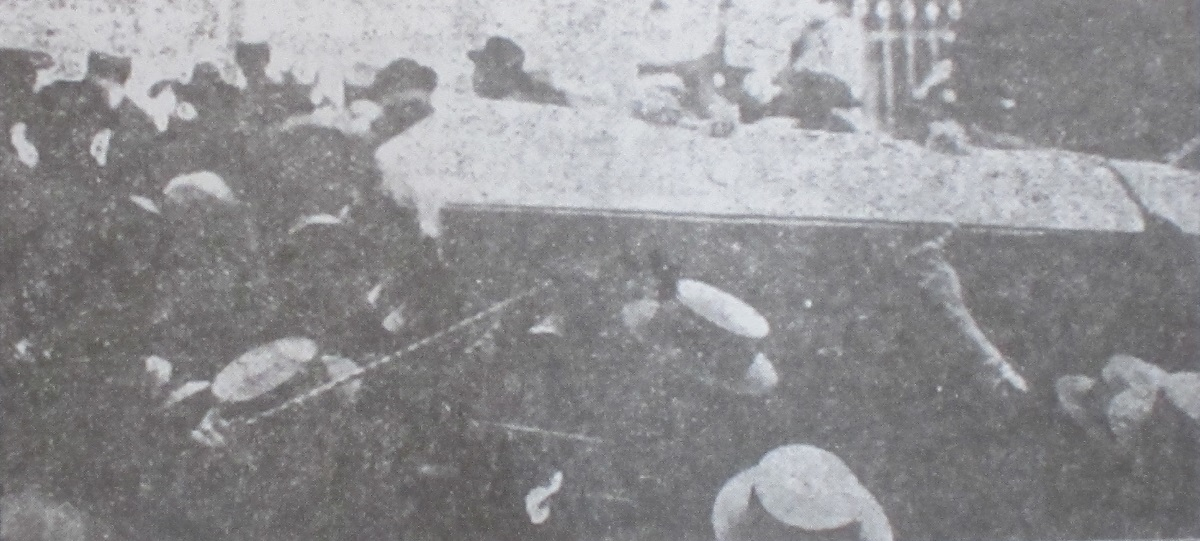
Mourners carrying Elza Niego's coffin

Elza Niego was employed as a typist for the National Insurance Company of Turkey. While vacationing on Heybeliada, she was approached by Osman Ratıp Bey, a prominent Muslim official 30 years her senior. Osman Ratıp Bey reportedly became obsessed with Niego, severing ties with his family to pursue her.

Following sustained harassment and stalking by Osman Ratıp, Niego cut her vacation short and returned to Istanbul. She subsequently filed a complaint with the police, resulting in Osman Ratıp's arrest and brief imprisonment. Upon his release, he continued to harass Niego and repeatedly proposed marriage to her mother, all of which were refused. Following Niego's engagement to a Jewish co-worker, Osman Ratıp confronted her on 17 August 1927 on Bankalar Caddesi. He attacked Niego with a knife, inflicting fatal wounds to her throat; her sister, Rejin, was also injured in the attack. While contemporary press coverage often framed the incident as a "crime of passion," modern scholars analyze it as a clear instance of stalking and femicide.

== Aftermath ==
The funeral of Elza Niego turned into a spontaneous public demonstration against the state's failure to protect her. The crowd, chanting slogans such as "We want justice," was interpreted by the Turkish government and press as acting against the Turkish identity. Prominent nationalist newspapers launched an anti-Jewish campaign, accusing the protestors of arrogance and disloyalty.

Following the demonstration, authorities detained nine or ten Jewish protestors, including a Russian witness to the murder. They were charged with "insulting the Turkish Republic" and "Turkishness." Although acquitted in the first trial, a second trial was initiated, resulting in the conviction of four protestors. The incident served as a catalyst for increased restrictions on the Jewish community, including the widening of the "Citizen, speak Turkish!" campaign.

Osman Ratıp Bey was arrested and charged with murder. He successfully pleaded insanity and was committed to the Bakırköy Psychiatric Hospital. On 22 February 1935, he escaped the facility but was apprehended by police after a 24-hour search. He was killed by a fellow patient in the hospital in 1938.

== See also ==
- Citizen, speak Turkish!
- Antisemitism in Turkey
- Femicide in Turkey
