= Abdulghafour Arezou =

Afghan writer, poet and diplomat

Dr Abdulghafour Arezou
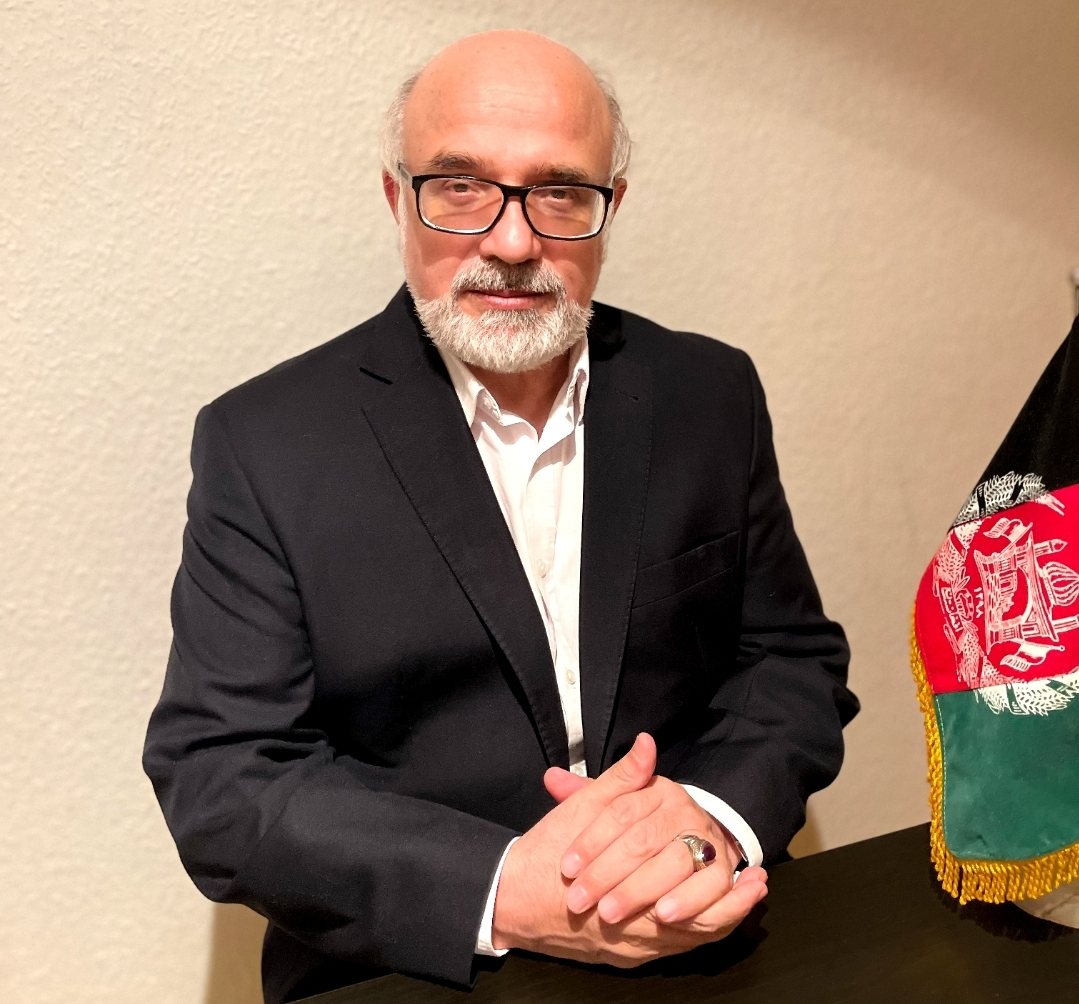
- Born: 17 February 1962 (age 64); Herat, Afghanistan
- Occupations: Writer, poet, diplomat, and university professor
- Years active: Since 1978
- Title: Ambassador of Afghanistan to Tajikistan
- Term: 2010–2016
- Predecessor: Mohammad Kheirkhah
- Successor: Zalmai Younosi
- Spouse: Roudabeh Tamanna
- Children: Ramin, Ghazal, Benyamin

Abdulghafour Arezou (Persian: عبدالغفور آرزو) (born February 17, 1962, in Herat, Afghanistan) is an Afghan writer, poet, Bīdelšinās, former ambassador of the Islamic Republic of Afghanistan to Tajikistan and former university professor. By 2014 he had written more than 40 books about Persian poetry, literature, culture, and politics Former Afghan president Ashraf Ghani called him one of the most prominent writers of modern Afghanistan. For his contribution to culture and language, he was awarded the medal of Ghazi Mir Bacha Khan kohdamani and the Abolghasem Ferdowsi's artistic cultural emblem.

== Biography ==
=== Life and education ===
Abdulghafour Arezou was born on 17 February 1962 in Herat, Afghanistan in an educated family. His father, Akhtar Mohamad, was a government official and his mother, Zainab, was a housewife. He finished primary school at Seyf ibn Yaqub Heravi High school. His brothers, Dr. Abdulrasul and Abdullah Arezou, and his nephew Dr. Parviz Arezu are also poets. He is married to Roudabeh Tamanna, the daughter of Afghan poet Abdul Karim Tamanna, and the couple have three children named Ramin, Ghazal, and Benyamin.

He obtained his Ph.D. in the Persian language and literature from the Tarbiat Modares University in 2007. He completed his second master's degree in political science in 2016 from Tajik State Pedagogical University.

=== Political activism and governmental works ===
Abdulghafour Arezou formed a close relationship with the anti-Taliban commander Ismail Khan and became his personal advisor. Following the United States invasion of Afghanistan, Arezou became the chief of staff of Ismail Khan's Herat province government and accompanied him to Switzerland to raise funds for rebuilding Afghanistan. He resigned from his post after seven months due to political disagreement and subsequently was appointed chargé d'affaires of the Afghanistan Embassy in Tehran, Iran. After that he was an advisor to the Afghanistan Minister of Foreign Affairs between 2007 and 2010. From 2010 to 2016 he was the Ambassador of Afghanistan to Tajikistan, and under his ambassadorship the new building of the Afghanistan embassy in Tajikistan was inaugurated by then Afghanistan president Hamid Karzai and Tajikistan president Emomali Rahmon. Lastly, from 2016 until the Fall of Kabul he was the Director General of the diplomatic archive of the Afghanistan foreign ministry. Due to the threat of persecution by the Taliban, he and his family escaped to Iran, where he joined the Center of Khorasan Studies of Ferdowsi University of Mashhad.

== Bibliography ==
=== Politics and history ===
- چگونگی هویت ملی افغانستان (The analysis of Afghanistan's national identity), Erfan publication, Tehran, ISBN 964-06-2400-4, 2003
- سیاست خارجی افغانستان در استانه ی قرن بیست و یک (Afghanistan's foreign policy on the eve of the 21st century), Afghanistan Ministry of foreign affairs, Kabul 2009
- افغانستان و جامعه ی جهانی (Afghanistan and the international community), Shabir Publication, Kabul, 2010
- روشنفکر کیست (who is an intellectual?), Zahab Publication, Kabul, 2011
- چگونگی دکترین سیاست خارجی و سیاست های راهبردی (Foreign policy doctrine and strategic politics), Saeed Publication, Kabul, 2015
- تداوم سیاست خارجی و چالش های مرحله ی گذار (The stability of foreign politics and the difficulties of the transitional period), Afghanistan Embassy in Tajikistan, Dushanbe, 2016
- بحران آب و دیپلوماسی خاموش (Water crisis and the silent diplomacy (hydro geopolitics)), Afghanistan Embassy in Tajikistan, Dushanbe, ISBN 978-600-6026-76-3, 2016
- نو اندیشی و دیپلوماس مدرن افغانستان (The new line of thinking of modern Afghanistan diplomacy), Parand Publication, Kabul, 2018
- نقش عبدالهادی داوی در دو بزنگاه تاریخی : جنیش مشروطیت و دموکراسی شاهی (The role of Abdul Hadi Dawi in two historical moments: the movement of constitutionalism and the king democracy), Azem Publication, Kabul, ISBN 978-9936-704-25-4, 2019
- روشنفکر و چگونگی روشنفکری (Intellectual and intellectualism), Azem Publication, Kabul, ISBN 978-9936-31-128-2, 2019
- روابط دیپلوماتیک افغانستان و ترکیه (The diplomatic relations of Afghanistan and Turkey), Amiri Publication, Kabul, ISBN 978-9936-804-59-0, 2021
- درون کاوی جامعه شناسیک دوره ابدالیان (A study of Afghanistan's society during the Abdalian period), The center of strategic studies of Afghanistan ministry of foreign affairs, Kabul, ISBN 978-9936-604-45-2, 2021
- دریچه‌ای چند به قلمرو تیموریان هرات (A study of Timourids' reign of Herat), The Grand Cultural Center of Ustad Abul Wahed Bahreh, Herat, ISBN 978-9936-1-0543-0, 2022

=== Mysticism ===
- شعر و شهود عارفانه (Mysticism poetry), Maiwand Publications, Kabul, 2010
- گوهر گمشده ی همگرایی (The lost gem of Convergence), Mosleh Publication, Germany, 2017

=== Bedil studies ===
- گزیده رباعیات بیدل دهلوی (A selection of Bidel poetry), Taraneh Publishers, Mashhad, 1997
- بوطیقای بیدل (Poetics of Bedil), Taraneh Publishers, Mashhad, 1999
- خوشه هایی از جهان بینی بیدال (a token of Bedil's world vision), Taraneh Publishers, Mashhad, 2002
- در خانه ی افتاب ... (In the house of the sun ...), Soore Mehr Publication, Tehran, ISBN 978-964-506-511-7, 2008
- مقایسه انسان کامل از دیدگاه بیدل و حافظ (A comparison of perfect human from Bidel's and Hafiz's viewpoint), Soore Mehr Publication, Tehran, ISBN 978-964-506-510-0, 2009
- تر صدایی بیدل (The wave of Bedil's poem), Maiwand Publications, Kabul, 2010
- یک بیت، یک کتاب (one verse, one book), Ahrari Publication, Herat, ISBN 978-9936-1-0544-7, 2022

=== Literature and literary criticism ===
- نقد خلیلی (A Criticism of Khalily's poem), Taraneh Publishers, Mashhad, ISBN 964-90896-1-6, 1997
- سیاه سپید اندرون:سیری در آثار مئلانا حاج محمد اسماعیل سیاه (A study of Molawna haj Mohammad Esmaiel Siyah), Taraneh Publishers, Mashhad, ISBN 964-90896-9-1, 2002
- درنگی در ادبیات فرنگ (a glance into the literature of the West), Maiwand Publications, Kabul, 2009
- هیچ گنجی نیست از فرهنگ به (No treasure is greater than culture), The Afghanistan Publication, Kabul, 2008
- شادزی... (در قلمرو رودکی) (Live Happy: a study of Rudaki), Maiwand Publications, Kabul, ISBN 978-99947-913-6-1, 2010
- عاشقان را خدای صبر دهاد (دریچه ای به قلمرو فرخی) (God gives all lovers patience: a study of Farokhi), The Afghanistan Publication, Kabul, 2010
- عشق ست خلاصه ی وجودم (در قلمرو لیلی و مجنون) (Love is the essence of my existence: a Study of Layla and Majnun), The Afghanistan Publication, Kabul, 2010
- اگر فرهاد شد شیرین بماناد (دریچه ای بر قلمرو خسرو و شیرین نظامی) (A study of Khosro and Shirin), Maiwand Publications, Kabul, 2010
- ز گیتی بر آهیخت شعر بنفش (در قلمرو ورقه و گلشاه عیّوقی) (A study of Vorghe and Golshah), The Afghanistan Publication, Kabul, 2010
- بازگشت ادبی (A literary return), Maiwand Publications, Kabul, 2012
- صد صفر و یک الف (zero 100 and 1 a), Mosleh Publication, Germany, 2017
- چگونگی حماسه سرایی در ادبیات معاصر افغانستان (The how of Epic writing in modern Afghanistan literature), Azem Publication, Kabul, ISBN 978-9936-31-096-4, 2019

=== Quran studies ===
- نیم نگاهی به تفسیر مفاتیح الغیب (A glance into Mafāṭīḥ al-ghayb), Maiwand Publications, Kabul, 2010

=== Anthologies of others' poetry ===
- دیوان محمد امین عندلیب (The Diwan of Mohammad Amin Andalib Tarzi), Maiwand Publications, Kabul, 2010
- بدرود (اشعار عبدالرسول آرزو) (Goodbye, a collection of late Dr.Abdulrasul Arezou's poetry), Parand Publications, Kabul, 2019

=== Poems ===
- چهار شاعر چهار برادر (4 poets, 4 brothers), Gole aftab publication, Mashhad, 1999
- جاری تر از همیشه (Flowing more than ever), Erfan publication, Tehran, 2010
- چشم در چشم آینه (Eye to eye to mirror), Shabir Publication, Kabul, 2010
- سرود مسلسل (The Song of machine guns), Zahab Publication, Kabul, 2011
- حماسه ی ساتی برزن (The legend of Sati Barzan), Ahrari Publication, Herat, 2011
- لبخند خدا (The Smile of god), Mega print, Dushanbe, 2014
- باغچه بی حرس (The unpruned garden), Parand Publications, Kabul, 2020
