= Human trafficking in Armenia =

Armenia ratified the 2000 UN TIP Protocol in July 2003.

In 2017, Armenia was a source country for women subjected to trafficking in persons (TIP), specifically forced prostitution; a source and destination country for women in forced labor; and a source country for men in forced labor. Women from Armenia were subjected to sex trafficking in the United Arab Emirates and Turkey.

Armenian men and women were subjected to forced labor in Russia while Armenian women were subjected to forced labor in Turkey. Armenian boys were subjected to conditions of forced labor and Armenian women and girls were subjected to forced prostitution within the country. Women from Russia were subjected to conditions of forced labor in Armenia.

In January 2010, the Armenian government enacted legislation that increased the minimum penalty for convicted trafficking offenders to five years’ imprisonment, allowed for the confiscation of assets from convicted trafficking offenders, and exempted trafficking victims from criminal prosecution for crimes committed as a direct result of being trafficked. While the government did not provide funding for victim assistance in 2009, in March 2010 it allocated approximately $15,000 to an NGO-run shelter for facility rent. The government continued to implement its national trafficking victim referral mechanism and nearly doubled the number of victims it identified compared with the previous year. The government demonstrated modest progress in combating government officials’ complicity in trafficking.

== International response ==
The U.S. Trafficking in Persons Report was released in June 2014, and Armenia maintained its Tier 1 status, which they had achieved the year before making the country the only one to advance to the highest Tier. The ranking indicates that the government has acknowledged the existence of human trafficking, made significant efforts towards the problem, and complies with the given standards. Armenia was one of the world's most successful countries when it comes to the fight against human trafficking.

The 2016 TIP report placed Armenia once again in "Tier 1", it made mention of the pivotal role Armenia's Anti-TIP Working Group was making, including representation from the government, civil society, and international organizations.

The U.S. State Department's Office to Monitor and Combat Trafficking in Persons placed the country in "Tier 1" in 2017. The country remained on "Tier 1" through the demonstration of serious and sustained efforts in the identification of victims, the adoption of a national action plan, and the establishment and allocation of funds for a compensation fund for trafficking victims. Armenia delegates attended the 18th Alliance against Trafficking in Person Conference that was organized by the Organization for Security and Co-operation in Europe (OSCE) in Vienna in April 2018. 80 Countries were represented through various international and civil society organizations. The conference included various workshops focused on topics like enhancing access to compensation for crime victims, aspects of gender and human trafficking, the role of civil society, caring for minors, and the importance of the media in the fight against human trafficking. Armenia’s participation supports its efforts to modernize its law enforcement and counter transnational crime, including human and drug trafficking.

In 2019, Armenia did not comply with the minimum standards for the elimination of trafficking and therefore remained in "Tier 2", as in 2018. The government showed increasing efforts by providing training to law enforcement, organizing various awareness campaigns, actively identifying forced labor victims, and training 64 social workers to work together on trafficking issues.

The country was placed at Tier 2 in 2023.

In 2023, the Organised Crime Index gave the country a score of 3 out of 10 for human trafficking.

== Prosecution ==
The Armenian government has increased its overall law enforcement efforts against human trafficking; however, it has not demonstrated efforts to prosecute cases linked to previous allegations of government officials’ complicity. Armenia prohibits trafficking in persons for both forced labor and commercial sexual exploitation through Articles 132 and 132-1 of its penal code which, as amended in January 2010, prescribe penalties of at least five years’ imprisonment and up to 15 years’ imprisonment - penalties that are commensurate with those prescribed for other serious crimes, such as rape.

The government investigated 15 cases of trafficking - including nine sex trafficking and six labor trafficking investigations - compared with 13 investigations in 2008. Armenian courts prosecuted 19 individuals in 12 trafficking cases during the reporting period, compared with eight individuals prosecuted in 2008. Authorities convicted 11 trafficking offenders in 2009 - including eight individuals for sex trafficking and three for labor trafficking - up from four convictions in 2008. All 11 convicted offenders in 2009 were given prison sentences; no traffickers received suspended sentences. Four offenders were given sentences ranging from three to five years’ and seven offenders were given sentences ranging from seven to 13 years’ imprisonment. As a result of the government’s anti-trafficking partnerships with outside parties, approximately 447 government officials received training from anti-trafficking NGOs, international organizations, foreign governments, and the Armenian government on a range of anti-trafficking issues including the application of Armenia’s anti-trafficking law and the national victim referral mechanism, investigation techniques, and forced labor. Although there were no new reports of government officials’ complicity in trafficking over the last year, the government demonstrated only modest progress in the reopened investigation of a well-documented 2006 corruption case. The separate trial of a former deputy principal of a state-run special needs school who was accused of forcing two students to beg in 2008 remained in progress at the conclusion of this reporting period.

In 2017, the government of Armenia maintained the law enforcement efforts, and investigated 16 trafficking cases, compared to the 14 investigations from 2015. From the 16 cases, 5 were sex trafficking, 10 labor trafficking and one was both. That year the government also trained 334 investigators from the Investigative Committee and 83 police officers on labor trafficking issues. In cooperation with INTERPOL, the Armenian government coordinated investigations with four foreign governments.

In 2019, Armenia did not convict any traffickers and prosecuted less than in 2018, making it the third consecutive year that the government identified fewer trafficking cases. Victims were subject to low access to justice, procedures and victim-witness protection which resulted in re-victimization and homelessness. Not a single government labor inspection was conducted throughout the reporting period which caused a reduction in the ability to identifying, investigating and preventing forced labor.

== Protection ==
The Government of Armenia has demonstrated mixed efforts to identify and provide protection to victims of trafficking. The government did not spend the funding that it had allocated for victim assistance in 2009, but in March 2010, it signed an agreement with a local NGO to provide funding for facility rent for one trafficking shelter from February through December 2010.

In September 2009, the government issued a decree that ensures victims are provided access to free state-provided medical services; two victims received such medical assistance during the reporting period. The government continued to implement its national victim referral mechanism. In March 2010, the government enacted changes to the national referral mechanism, increasing government-funded assistance and shelter for trafficking victims from seven to 30 days after their initial identification; additional assistance was contingent upon their cooperation with law enforcement investigations.

NGOs expressed concern that the national referral mechanism was disproportionately focused on prosecuting trafficking offenders rather than assisting victims. The government significantly increased the number of identified victims during the reporting period: law enforcement officials identified 60 victims in 2009 and referred 22 of them to NGOs for assistance, compared with 34 victims identified and 20 referred for assistance in 2008. Foreign-funded NGOs assisted 26 victims in 2009, compared with 24 victims in 2008. Victims were encouraged to cooperate with law enforcement bodies; in 2009, all 60 victims assisted police with trafficking investigations.

NGOs also reported improved sensitivity for victims’ rights among judges and prosecutors. Foreign trafficking victims identified within Armenia were permitted to stay in the country and work in the local economy. In November 2009, the government enacted a legislative amendment that exempts trafficking victims from criminal prosecution for any unlawful acts they may have committed as a direct result of being trafficked; there were no reports of victims being penalized for such acts during the reporting period. The lack of appropriate victim-witness protection continued to be an issue of concern; this may have hampered Armenia’s prosecution efforts.

The protection efforts were maintained in 2017, where 22 victims were identified compared to the 9 from 2015. 19 of the victims accepted assistance from NGO-run shelters, and the government allocated 18.8 million AMD ($39,260) for victim protection efforts, including the costs to run the shelters. The government also placed 1.8 million AMD ($3,650) into the compensation fund which provides trafficking victims with a one time pay out of 250,000 AMD ($520). In February 2017, one of the NGO-run shelters was closed since the donor-funded project had ended.

== Prevention ==
The Armenian government has undertaken anti-human trafficking prevention efforts, particularly through awareness raising during the reporting period. In 2009, the government’s Migration Agency allocated about $8,000 for the publication and distribution of 100,000 brochures and leaflets describing legal procedures for Armenians seeking to work abroad. These materials were distributed to migrant travelers at the airport in Yerevan and also at employment centers and social resource centers.

The government also provided approximately $20,000 for an awareness campaign targeted at adolescents titled “Campaigns Among Youth to Increase Awareness on the Threat of Trafficking.” The campaign included a digital video conference discussion of the dangers of trafficking that aired on Armenian public television. The campaign also included additional regional workshops to train youth leaders about the dangers of trafficking – this information was then disseminated to their peers. Border officials did not specifically monitor emigration and immigration patterns for evidence of trafficking, and the government made no discernible efforts to reduce demand for commercial sex acts.

In 2017 the government increased the prevention efforts for human trafficking and developed and adopted the 2016-2018 National Action Plan (NAP). The Inter-Agency Working Group against Trafficking in Persons regularly met throughout the year and published semi-annual and annual activity reports. Various prevention projects and activities were conducted by government agencies, and the police held awareness-raising discussions in schools, transmitted videos, and participated in television programs devoted to trafficking issues. Individuals that were crossing the border were provided with information on the risks of trafficking from the Ministry of Diaspora.

== See also ==
- Human rights in Armenia
- Human trafficking in Europe
- Social issues in Armenia
