= Murder of Münevver Karabulut =

2009 murder in Istanbul, Turkey

Münevver Karabulut
- Born: 7 March 1991; Istanbul, Turkey
- Died: 3 March 2009 (aged 17); Etiler, Istanbul, Turkey

High school student Münevver Karabulut was murdered by Cem Garipoğlu on 3 March 2009 in Istanbul, Turkey. The news of the murder attracted the attention of the people and brought about many responses by the public. The suspect Cem Garipoğlu was arrested 197 days after the murder. The trial ended on 18 November 2011 with the conviction of Garipoğlu. On 10 October 2014, Garipoğlu killed himself by suffocation using a plastic bag and a twine in his cell in Silivri Prison where he was serving his sentence.

== Münevver Karabulut ==
Münevver Karabulut was born in Istanbul on 7 March 1991 as the first child of a family from Mengen, Bolu. Her father Süreyya Karabulut was a cook, and her mother Nagihan Karabulut was a housewife. Karabulut, who was a senior at Beşiktaş Bingül Erdem High School, was also attending university preparatory classes. She met Cem Garipoğlu during these classes and their friendship began there.

== Murder ==
On the evening of 3 March 2009, Münevver Karabulut's dead body was found torn by a garbage collector in a garbage container. As a result of forensic examination, it was determined that the head was injured by knife strokes, which resulted in her death, and then the head was cut off from the body.

=== Investigation ===
The main suspect, Cem Garipoğlu, was a fugitive for about six months and the inability of the authorities in arresting him gave rise to criticism from members of the public. Protests took place in many places in Istanbul to ask the authorities to arrest the suspect as soon as possible. A special team was established by the Istanbul Police Department to arrest the suspect. Outside Turkey, Interpol issued a red notice to seek the arrest of Garipoğlu. The minister of the interior at the time, Beşir Atalay, ordered the Istanbul Police to arrest the suspect. After Celalettin Cerrah's controversial remarks that the incident wouldn't have happened "If [the parents] took care of their daughter", he was replaced as the Istanbul Police Chief by Hüseyin Çapkın who promised that the suspect was to be found very soon.

As the investigation into the murder continued, the autopsy report prepared by the Forensic Medicine Institute turned out to be inaccurate. During the autopsy, it was found out that DNA samples of other bodies were mixed with that of the victim and a second autopsy report was prepared. Meanwhile, rumors that the suspect had escaped Turkey were denied by the minister of the interior Beşir Atalay. On 12 September 2009, many newspapers reported on the allegations about Garipoğlu's possible arrest in Armenia, though these claims turned out to be unfounded. The investigation process was also followed by the "TBMM Human Rights Investigation Commission". According to the report submitted to the commission, police raided 106 addresses in 16 provinces to arrest the suspect.

On 17 September 2009, 197 days after the murder, Cem Garipoğlu was arrested in Istanbul.

== Legal process ==
After the investigation was completed in November 2009, it was decided that Cem Garipoğlu be tried together with his father under one case, and the trial for the two merged cases started on 26 February 2010. In the case, Münevver Karabulut's mother, father and brother were the complainants, and 7 suspects were tried: Cem Garipoğlu and his father Nida Garipoğlu who were on trial for committing the crime, Cem's mother Makbule Garipoğlu who faced allegations that she had "destroyed the evidence of crime", Cem Garipoğlu's uncle Hayyam Garipoğlu who was suspected of hiding Cem, and finally Habib Kurt, Mehmet Karakayalı, and Ahmet Batur who were alleged to have helped with protecting Cem. After the incident, Garipoğlu's father Nida Garipoğlu had been arrested on charges of helping the murderer, but was eventually released on the grounds that there was enough evidence which proved he had an alibi for the time the crime was being committed. Later on 27 April 2009, Cem Garipoğlu's parents were arrested and his father was detained per curiam. He was released 2 days later at the second hearing of the case.

In their lawsuit, Münevver Karabulut's mother, father and brother demanded a ₺2 million compensation from Cem Garipoğlu's family.

On April 16, 2011, the Karabulut family filed a motion for recusal of the presiding judge, Mevlüt Bayraktaroğlu, on the grounds that he had acquitted the defendant Hayyam Gariboğlu in a fraudulent bankruptcy case 16 years earlier. Following this, presiding judge Mevlüt Bayraktaroğlu decided to withdraw from the case.

=== Verdict ===
On the 18 November 2011, Cem Garipoğlu was sentenced to 24 years in prison. His mother and uncle were each sentenced to 3 years in prison, while his father was acquitted. In another lawsuit for negligence in the work of the forensic medicine institution and three forensic officers, two doctors and one autopsy technician, were tried. The autopsy technician was sentenced to 5 months imprisonment for neglecting in his duties while doctors were acquitted.

=== Claim for damages ===
Following the conclusion of the main case, the Karabulut family's lawsuit against Cem Garipoğlu's family for pecuniary and non-pecuniary damages concluded on 8 October 2013. At the end of the case, it was decided that the Garipoğlu family would pay the Karabulut family ₺37,500 for pecuniary damages and ₺1,250,000 for non-pecuniary damages.

== Death of Cem Garipoğlu ==
Garipoğlu went to prison and on October 10, 2014, committed suicide in his three-person cell, where he was held alone, using a rope and a plastic bag. Following his death, numerous conspiracy theories emerged. Claims such as that he didn't actually die but was kidnapped, and that his learning Chinese in his cell indicated he was preparing to flee to China, were frequently discussed. An Instagram post by Garipoğlu's sister brought the murder back into the spotlight. In the photo, all of Garipoğlu's siblings and mother were seen smiling while sitting on the couch which was in the murder scene. This post further strengthened suspicions surrounding Garipoğlu's death. Münevver's father, Süreyya Karabulut, stated that the photo disturbed him and increased his suspicions.

On May 1, 2024, several photographs from Garipoğlu's autopsy were released. On October 3, 2024, Garipoğlu's grave was opened at the request of the Karabulut family. The remains were exhumed and sent to the Forensic Medicine Institute for DNA analysis to determine their identity. Following the examination, it was announced that the remains belonged to Garipoğlu.
