= Murder of Şule Çet =

Murder in Turkey

Şule Çet was a 23-year-old student who was studying fashion design at the Gazi University in Ankara, Turkey. She was murdered after having been raped in the night of the 24 May 2018. The murderer was sentenced to life imprisonment and his accomplice to over 18 years in prison.

== Background ==
On the 24 May 2018, Şule Çet was invited out for dinner by her boss Çağatay Aksu and his friend Berk Akand. After dinner they went into an office on the 20th floor in a building in Ankara. At first they had a drink and enjoyed themselves. After midnight, Çet sent text messages to her roommate informing her that it was not what she had expected and that Aksu wouldn't let go of her.

== Murder ==
From Şule Çet's mobile phone the last message was sent at 3:03 A.M., and at approximately 4:00 A.M. Berk Akand was recorded on a surveillance camera as he reported evidently moved about what happened to the security personnel of the building. During the night, Berk Akand wrote a message to his friend he knew from the University mentioning he resented what has happened. Çet was thrown out of the window from the 20th floor of the building. Initially, the men claimed the woman committed suicide, but later on it was shown that she was raped and murdered. That her throat was broken was seen as a proof for her to have been strangled. A forensic medical report showed that before she was thrown out of the window, there was a fight and that Çet was raped. It was noted that there were no fingerprints of hers on the windows, and that the window only could to be opened by a width of 30 centimeters. Following the murder of Çet, both men attempted to flee and called more than ten times an airline. As surveillance cameras later showed, they were too drunk to reach the plane.

== Trial ==
Following their interrogation, the men were set free. Çağatay Aksu and Berk Akand were only arrested on the 14 July 2018, after a campaign which demanded their arrest. The first hearing in case was scheduled to take place on the 6 February 2019. The defendants pleaded not guilty and Aksu defended himself they only were having a drink while he tried to help Çet out, who allegedly was in financial trouble. But both men gave contradictory testimonies of the events, as Aksu mentioned he washed glasses after Çet had jumped out of the window, and the Akand said Aksu washed the glasses before Çet jumped. Then the men's lawyers alleged that Çet was not a virgin anymore and also agreed to drink alcohol in a secluded room. Therefore, the defense and the courts medical department came to the conclusion that the sexual intercourse was performed in mutual consent, which caused an outcry in social media. The defense also complained that the family of Çet pressured the public society for an arrest of the defendants. As the defending lawyers demanded the release of their clients, the public applauded, to which a member of Çet's family responded "You killed our daughter, what are you applauding" The prosecution aimed at an aggravated life sentence for the defendants. In December 2019, Çağatay Aksu was convicted to a life sentence for the killing of Şule Çet and received a second sentence over 12 and a half years for "deprivation of liberty and sexual assault". His accomplice Berk Akand was sentenced to 18 years and 9 months for his assistance in the murder. The lawyer of the Çet family, said he would appeal the verdict, as he did not agree with the court that Aksu has shown such a good behavior in court, that he merited only a life sentence instead of an aggravated life sentence. In June 2020, both verdicts were confirmed by the appeals court in Ankara, but the attorneys of the Çet family did still not agree on the alleviating conduct of Aksu during the trial, therefore they vowed to appeal the verdict.

== Reactions ==
The sentences were lauded by women organizations in Turkey. During the whole 19 months since Şule Çet murder, the case was accompanied by a social media campaign with the hashtag #SuleCetIcinAdalet (Justice for Sule Cet). Both, the lawyers of the Çet family and Mansur Yavaş, the mayor of Ankara, were satisfied with the ruling of the appeal court.

== Aftermath ==
The lawyer who defended Aksu, became a candidate to the Grand National Assembly of Turkey for the Victory Party (ZP) for the parliamentary elections of 2023.
