= Femicide in Iran =

Violence against women in Iran

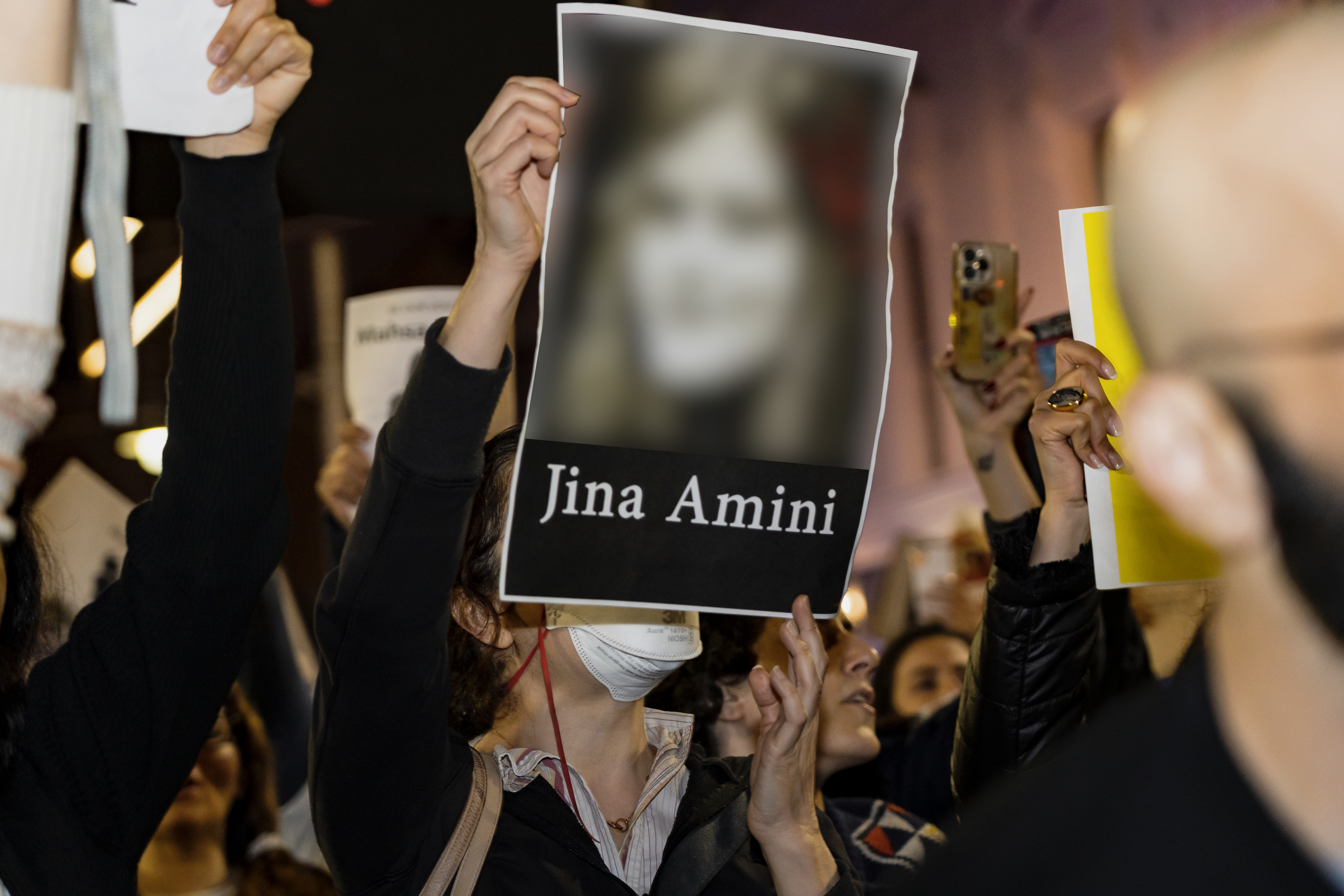
A poster of Mahsa Amini in the hands of a protester

Femicide in Iran is a phenomenon manifested in two broad trends: violent repression by the state authorities against women involved in protests, and so-called "honour killings" carried out by male family members operating according to rigid traditional social mores. In both cases, women are killed as a result of gender-based control mechanisms, sanctioned either by the authorities or within conservative family and social structures.

In the 2020s, especially during waves of protests such as those following the death of Mahsa Amini in 2022, numerous cases have been documented of women killed by security forces. These women took an active part in demonstrations or were targeted for allegedly violating Iran's laws for women dress codes or religious-social norms. According to IranWire and the National Council of Resistance in Iran's (NCRI) Women Committee, there have been numerous instances of women killed in the streets or while in detention, with little to no media coverage or legal transparency.

This increase in state repression against woman has also manifested in the form of applying the death penalty to women. According to the Norway-based NGO Iranian Human Rights (IHR), Iran accounted for 9 of the 16 documented executions of women in 2020. IHR reported that in 2024 Iranian government executed 31 women, the highest annual figure since the NGO began tracking death penalty cases in 2007. IHR further stated that between 2010 and 2024 a total of 241 Iranian women were executed by the state, Only 26% of these cases were publicised, a figure that dropped to 12% between 2021 and 2024. In 2025, IHR and the France-based Together Against the Death Penalty (EPCM) documented at least 48 executions of Iranian women. In connection to the 2025–2026 Iranian protests, the government has sentenced at least three women to death as of 27 April 2026.

At the same time, the phenomenon of honour killings persists, in which women are murdered by husbands, fathers, brothers or other relatives on the pretext that they brought "shame" to the family. These cases occur across Iran, from major cities to remote villages, and are often unreported or undocumented. Iranian law sometimes grants leniency to perpetrators, especially when the killer is the victim's father or a close relative.

Analyses of femicide in Iran by Peace Mark Magazine (affiliated with the Human Rights Activists in Iran [HRAI] network) and the Human Rights Research Center (HRRC), contextualise the practice as the result of a belief in patriarchal control and stemming from a combination of conservative religious and social values, discriminatory laws against woman and a lack of willpower by law enforcement agencies to uphold existing legislation defending women. Documentation by NGOs and watchdog groups regarding this phenomenon shows a rise in its frequency in the 2020s and often cites the failure of the judicial system and societal structures to effectively combat it.

== Data on femicide and violence against women ==
Human rights organisations have characterised femicide in Iran as a severe and systemic issue, citing data showing an sharp upward trend. These groups have also highlighted the lack of effective legal protection for women and the failure of Iranian authorities to prevent or punish gender-based violence. The U.S.-based Center for Human Rights in Iran cited a report by Stop Femicide in Iran (SFI) recording 149 cases of femicide in 2023, average of one woman was killed every two days by a family member, and 94 cases in the first half of 2024. According to a 2025 UK Home Office assessment on the topic, which cited the SFI report and other research into femicide in Iran, these recorded figures only represent publicly reported cases and undercount the phenomenon. The UK government suggested that the true number of femicide cases is likely much higher due to under-reporting, false reporting and wrongful characterisation of murders of women.

In March 2025, the United Nations Special Rapporteur on the situation of human rights in Iran, Mai Sato, cited at least 179 documented femicides in 2024. The report, compiled by , drew attention to troubling legal frameworks that protect male perpetrators, including laws that grant leniency for so-called "honour killings" and insufficient enforcement of protective measures. These systemic deficiencies point to state negligence (and in some cases, complicity) in enabling gender-based violence. Upon releasing the special report, Sato implied that authorities' lack of prosecution of femicide cases contributed to Iran's 121st place ranking out of 193 countries on the UN's Gender Inequality Index, the lowest of all high-human development countries.

A report by the Hengaw Organization for Human Rights documented 205 cases of femicide in Iran in 2025. The province with the highest number of femicide cases was Tehran, with 32. The report assessed that about 14.5% of femicide cases were linked to "honour" motives and that most cases were committed by male relatives of the victim.

=== 2000s ===
Research conducted in the early 2000s revealed that 66.3% of women had experienced some form of domestic violence since the beginning of their marriage. In 10.5% of cases, the violence was described as severe, while 53% of women faced violence within the first year of marriage. Although some of these incidents resulted in femicide, widespread censorship and a lack of transparency in official reporting have obscured the true scale of such crimes.

=== 2010s ===
In 2018, the Iranian Welfare Organization reported an increase in violence against women increased between 20% and 22% compared to the previous year. Experts attributed this to growing public awareness and improved reporting mechanisms, rather than a rise in actual incidents. Moreover, the Statistical Center of Iran reported on 80,187 forensic examinations conducted in 2019 related to domestic violence, in which 96% of the victims were female.

=== 2020s ===
At the start of the 2020s, forensic data showed that 97% of 20,735 physical domestic abuse cases involved female victims. In the same year, a study by Iran University of Medical Sciences found that 77.2% of women in five major cities experienced at least one form of violence during the COVID-19 lockdown. Among them, 91.2% suffered psychological violence, 65.8% physical abuse, 42.6% sexual violence, and 38.2% injuries resulting from violence.

According to a report by the Iranian reformist newspaper Etemad, between the first three months of 2022, 2023 and 2024 (1401–1403 AH) at least 85 women and girls were reportedly killed by close male relatives. Tehran Province recorded the highest number, with five reported cases. In 2023, at least 186 honor killings were documented, 32 of which occurred in Tehran alone.

==== 2026 Post-war ====
In 2026 within month in October-November at least 14 honour killings and other female murder cases were committed.

=== Accusations of institutional failure ===
Rights groups argue that these statistics not only represent widespread societal violence against women but also the systematic failure of the Iranian government to protect its female citizens. Discriminatory laws, lack of accountability for perpetrators, and the absence of independent investigative mechanisms have created an environment in which violence against women (including femicide) is met with impunity.

As noted by the HRCC, the Islamic Republic of Iran's Penal Code, which is based in Shi'ite interpretations of Sharia law, provides various exemptions for men who commit femicide. The killing of women related to family "honour" is often treated as premeditated murder subject to Islamic retributive justice (qisas). However, Article 301 of the code abrogates fathers and paternal grandfathers who kill children or grandchildren from qisas, while Article 630 excludes husbands from punishments for killing spouses suspected of adultery. Article 302 moreover exempts killers from retributive justice if their victim was alleged to have committed a hadd, a serious crime under Islamic law, with the complementary Article 612 allowing Sharia court judges leniency in imposing prison sentences rather than the death penalty. The HRCC maintains that this legal framework enables a "dangerous hierarchy of violence" and perpetuates gender-based violence, including femicide.

A proposed bill to protect women, formally known as the "Preventing Harm to Women and Improving Their Safety Against Maltreatment Law" was proposed in the Iranian parliament in the early 2010s, but remains unapproved as of May 2026. The proposed law has been examined by lawmakers, the judiciary and government many times over 15 years, with critics expressing concern that its proposed scope has been significantly water down, but has not moved beyond the initial stage in the legislative process.

NCRI argues that in several documented cases, state institutions have either ignored or implicitly condoned the crimes against women, arguing this underscores a need for reform in Iran's legal and judicial approach to gender-based violence. Attention in the 2020s has been given to the lack of shelters or safe houses for threatened women to seek refuge, along with the government's closure of some of the few existing ones. Moreover, critics of Iran's weak enforcement on laws to protect women note Iran is one of only very few countries in the world that has not yet ratified the Convention on the Elimination of All Forms of Discrimination Against Women (CEDAW).

== State-perpetrated femicide ==
In Iran, multiple cases have been documented in which women were killed by state authorities in relation to the compulsory hijab statutes or participation in protests.

=== Neda Agha-Soltan ===
Neda Agha-Soltan, a 26-year-old philosophy student, was shot and killed on 20 June 2009 during the post-election protests of 2009 on Kargar Shomali Street in Tehran. Footage of her death was widely circulated and became a global symbol of state violence against protesters and of the resilience of Iranian women and citizens.

=== Mahsa Amini ===
On 13 September 2022, Mahsa Amini, a 22-year-old Kurdish woman from Saqqez, was arrested in Tehran by the Guidance Patrol (the Iranian state morality police) for "improperly" wearing the mandatory hijab. She died three days later while in custody, after she had been in a coma that supposedly was caused by her violent treatment by police. Her death triggered nationwide protests and sparked the beginning of the Woman, Life, Freedom movement protests.

=== Arezu Badri ===
In July 2024, Arezu Badri, a young woman from Nur County, Mazandaran Province, was shot by police officers for not wearing a mandatory hijab. Authorities claimed that the police were attempting to pull her over and confiscate her car due to her refusal to comply with the hijab mandate. She was taken to a hospital in critical condition.

=== Nika Shakarami ===
On 20 September 2022, Nika Shakarami, a 17-year-old girl from Lorestan, disappeared in Tehran during the Woman, Life, Freedom protests. Nine days later, her body was found in a Tehran morgue bearing signs of severe violence. Iranian authorities claimed her death was caused by a fall, but her family and witnesses rejected this account, calling it an attempt to cover up her murder. Her death became a symbol of state violence against protesters and provoked widespread reactions both in Iran and internationally. In April 2024, the British Broadcasting Corporation (BBC) aired a documentary, titled Nika's Last Breathe, which presents evidence suggesting that she was sexually assaulted and beaten during her arrest. The show additionally accuses three agents of the Islamic Revolutionary Guard Corps (IRGC) of causing her death.

=== Elahe Hosseinnezhad ===
Elahe Hosseinnezhad, a 24-year-old woman from Eslamshahr, disappeared on 25 May 2025 after leaving her workplace in the Sa'adat Abad neighborhood of Tehran. She was last seen entering a passing car in Azadi Square, after which all contact with her ceased. Ten days later, her body was found in the desert near Tehran's Mehrabad International Airport.

According to the Hengaw Organization for Human Rights, Hosseinnezhad's killing highlighted the weaknesses of Iran's security and support systems for protecting women. While the Islamic Republic allocates considerable resources to enforcing compulsory dress codes and restricting women's public freedoms, it has failed to ensure their basic safety. The murder of Elahe Hosseinnezhad has come to symbolize the state's disregard for the rights and safety of women. Official policies continue to focus on controlling and limiting individual freedoms rather than protecting citizens.

=== Women killed during the 2022 protests ===
During the monthslong, nationwide protests following the death of Mahsa Amini, at least 537 people were killed, including at least 48 women (or 49 according to the UN). Most victims died as a result of gunfire or beatings by batons by security forces, while several showed signs of torture.

=== Violence by the Guidance Patrol ===
Numerous reports have documented violent behavior by the Guidance Patrol (morality police) against women. Many of these incidents occurred in the spring of 2024, when the government launched its Noor (Persian for "light") campaign to clamp down on perceived dress code "violations" by women not correctly wearing the mandatory hijab. These videos showed women being arrested by security agents, with some of them later showing signs of having been physically harmed. One of the women was reported to have been arrested and jailed in Evin Prison, considered a key detention site for political prisoners opposed to the government.

Legislation approved in December 2024 imposed severe fines for women accused of, among other things "unveiling or improper dressing", with repeat offenders subject to prison sentences of up to 15 years. The law also stipulated that women accused of behaviour akin to "corruption on Earth" could receive a death sentence, per Article 286 of the penal code. Amnesty International explained this clause as in effect giving sanction to executing Iranian women who share with foreign media videos of themselves without a hijab or otherwise partaking in non-violent protests against the government.

=== Women killed during the 2025–2026 protests ===
On 8 March 2026, the Hengaw NGO released a report to coincide with International Women's Day concerning violations of women's rights by state authorities in the weeks-long anti-government protests between December 2025 and January 2026. The watchdog group asserted that 250 women had been killed by security forces at protests, of whom it could verify the identity of 204, based on data it obtained and analysed. Hengaw also stated that at least 25 girls under the age of 18 were killed in protest-related violence.

== See also ==
- Femicide in Turkey
