= Murder of Pınar Gültekin =

Femicide that occurred in Turkey in July 2020

Pınar Gültekin
- Born: 1 October 1993; Hizan, Bitlis, Turkey
- Disappeared: 16 July 2020; Ula, Muğla, Turkey
- Died: 16 July 2020 (aged 26); Menteşe, Muğla, Turkey
- Cause of death: Murder (Note: Strangulation by hand according to the assertion of the murderer.)
- Body discovered: 21 July 2020
- Resting place: Gayda Köyü Cemetery, Hizan, Bitlis
- Citizenship: Turkey
- Education: Muğla University
- Parents: Sıddık Gültekin (father); Şefika Gültekin (mother)
- Family: Sibel Gültekin (sister); Vedat Gültekin (brother)

Pınar Gültekin (1 October 1993 – 16 July 2020) was a Turkish woman who disappeared on 16 July 2020. Her body was found in the rural neighborhood of Yerkesik in Menteşe on 21 July 2020 after she was murdered. In July 2020, a global Instagram hashtag campaign called ChallengeAccepted was relaunched by a group of Turkish women in wake of the murder of Gültekin. Her body was later discovered in a plastic box in the woods.

== Disappearance ==
On 16 July, Gültekin who was a student at Muğla University School of Economics, left her house in the Akyaka neighborhood in the town of Ula where she lived alone. She could not be reached by her family and friends afterwards. Her younger sister Sibel Gültekin and her mother Şefika Gültekin came to Muğla and reported her disappearance to Akyaka Gendarmerie General Command and asked for help through social media.

== Murder ==
In the testimony of 32-year-old Cemal Metin Avcı, who was identified as the case's main suspect, he stated that he is married and the father of two children. However, he wished to rekindle his relationship with Pınar Gültekin, whom he had dated before. After Gültekin's refusal to accept his offer, the two engaged in an argument during which Avcı beat her up and left her unconscious. He then had the victim strangled. However, Gültekin's family disputed his claim of the two having a relationship, saying he was a jilted stalker who had met her at a bar and begun obsessively messaging her. Her father claims that he murdered her after she blocked him on social media and he couldn't take it.

== Aftermath ==
According to the information obtained from Avcı's testimonies and through further reviews, it became evident that Avcı had taken 2 bottles of gasoline from the gas station on the same day that he killed Gültekin, and tried to remove the trace of murder by burning her body in a garbage barrel in the forested area in Yerkesik neighborhood and poured concrete on it. As to why he murdered Gültekin, Avcı responded: "I killed her in a moment of anger". However Gültekin family's lawyer Rezan Epözdemir said that they believed this was a premeditated murder in which there were others involved and they delivered their suspicions to the prosecutor.

Cemal Metin Avcı was first sentenced to aggravated life imprisonment, then his sentence was reduced to 23 years with "unjust provocation" by the victim given as the reason. In the 13th hearing held at the Muğla 3rd High Criminal Court on 20 June 2022, Avcı's brother, who was sentenced to life imprisonment for alleged aiding in the murder, was acquitted. Avcı's mother Ayten Avcı, father Selim Avcı, ex-wife Eda Karagün and partner Şükrü Gökhan Orhan were acquitted because they were not proven to have committed the crimes of "destroying and concealing evidence".

The İzmir Regional Court of Appeal, 4th Criminal Chamber, overturned the Muğla 3rd High Criminal Court's decision, sentencing Cemal Metin Avcı to aggravated life imprisonment and his brother Mertcan Avcı to four years in prison for concealing evidence. The decision of the Regional Court of Appeal was overturned by the Court of Cassation, 1st Criminal Chamber, with a majority vote in February 2025. In the Court of Cassation’s ruling, it was stated that provocation discount should be applied to Cemal Metin Avcı.

== Reactions ==
=== Politicians and authorities ===
- A written statement was made by the Muğla Chief Public Prosecutor's Office regarding the initial investigation process, "Regarding the murder of P.G. in Muğla Province, a press release was required in order to inform the public about the news through the broadcasting media and social media. The investigation into the incident in the Menteşe district of Muğla has been carried out meticulously by two public prosecutors appointed by our Chief Public Prosecutor's Office, and a suspect has been taken into custody. Information about the developments will be given separately."
- President of Turkey Recep Tayyip Erdoğan commented on the incident through Twitter on 22 July 2020: "I have no doubt that the murderer of Pınar Gültekin will receive the heaviest punishment he deserves. I will personally follow the case, and as the government of the Republic of Turkey we will do whatever that is required to end the violence against women, which we do not want to ever happen again. I wish compassion to Pınar Gültekin, patience for her sorrowful family, friends and loved ones."
- Minister of Family, Labour and Social Services Zehra Zümrüt Selçuk reacted to the news by publishing a statement on her Twitter account: "The pain of our daughter Pınar Gültekin, who was murdered in Muğla, burned our heart; Another life has been taken. We will be a close follower of the legal process for the murderer to receive the heaviest punishment by participating in the case."
- Mayor of Istanbul Ekrem İmamoğlu, Mayor of Ankara Mansur Yavaş, Mayor of İzmir Tunç Soyer, Mayor of Aydın Özlem Çerçioğlu, Mayor of Eskişehir Yılmaz Büyükerşen and former MP Muharrem İnce, reacted to the incident via Twitter.

=== Celebrities ===
- Demet Akalın, Tarkan, Hadise, Gökhan Özoğuz, Sıla, Ece Seçkin, Kerem Bürsin, Hakan Hatipoğlu, Norm Ender, and Cem Adrian reacted to the incident via Twitter.

=== Sports clubs and sportspeople ===
- Sports clubs such as Beşiktaş, Fenerbahçe, Galatasaray and İstanbul Başakşehir, president of the Turkish Basketball Federation Hidayet Türkoğlu, and sportspeople such as Luigi Datome and Eda Erdem expressed their sorrow on Twitter.

=== The public ===
- Police intervened with the protests of the women who wanted to march in İzmir for Gültekin. According to the news of Gazete Duvar, at least 15 women were detained. The women activists were allegedly beaten by the police while they were detained.
- The "We'll Stop Femicide" platform wrote about the incident on Twitter: "While the man who killed #PınarGultekin tried to hide the murder, and while discussing the Istanbul Convention, women are still trying to decide for their lives. They are tortured to death and the criminals try to cover up femicides. #İstanbulSözleşmesiYaşatır"
