= Prostitution in Turkey =

Prostitution in Turkey is legal and regulated. The secularization of Turkish society allowed prostitution to achieve legal status during the early 20th century. State-run brothels, known as "general houses" (genelevler), receive permits from the government. The regulatory agencies also issue identity cards to sex workers that give them rights to some free medical care and other social services. However, many local governments now have a policy of not issuing new registrations, and in some cities, such as Ankara and Bursa, brothels have been demolished by court order. In 2012, it was estimated there are 100,000 unliscenced prostitutes in Turkey, half of whom are foreign born.

By the early 1900s, the approximated number of registered prostitutes in Istanbul was 2,000. Within this population, a study done in 1919–1920 concluded that sixty percent of these women were non-Muslim and forty percent were Muslim; however, these numbers did not account for the prostitutes who were working illegally. Investigation indicated that larger numbers of Muslim women were illegally or secretly engaging in prostitution, compare to their non-Muslim counterparts.

Throughout the years, an increasing number of women began to resort to prostitution as a means of financial income. Many women who resorted to prostitution did so due to being single mothers, homelessness, poverty, and to afford childcare services. While only registered and unmarried women over the age of eighteen can work in state-regulated brothels, those un-registered are forced to work outside the system. Thus, non-registered women had to work in illegal brothels, as streetwalkers, and sell sexual services from their homes.

== History ==
During the era of slavery in the Ottoman Empire, prostitution was connected to slavery. The Islamic Law formally prohibited prostitution. However, since the principle of concubinage in Islam in Islamic Law allowed a man to have intercourse with his female slave, prostitution was practiced by a pimp selling his female slave on the slave market to a client, who was allowed to have intercourse with her as her new owner, and who after intercourse returned his ownership of her to her pimp on the pretext of discontent, which was a legal and accepted method for prostitution in the Islamic world. The prostitution of female slaves were formally prohibited with the Kanunname of 1889.

Prostitution of non-enslaved free people were prohibited in the Ottoman Empire, but there are legal cases of free Ottoman prostitute women brought before the legal courts who appear to have engaged in sex work on an individual basis. By the 18th-century, local Ottoman authorities in the Ottoman Empire, such as in Damascus in Syria and in Egypt, had begun to tolerate clandestine prostitution of free sex workers in exchange for taxation. In 1839, the Tanzimat Edict decriminalized adultery, after which prostitutes and pimps would only be sentenced to prison. In 1839 new privileges were granted to foreign citizens in the Ottoman Empire, making them exempt from Ottoman law, and the first brothels was established in Istanbul by procurers and prostitutes who had accompanied the British, French and Italian troops during the Crimean war (1853–1856). In 1884, prostitution of free women prostitutes was legalized in the Ottoman Empire by the 1884 Ottoman Prostitution Regulation, which legalized brothels on condition that they were registered and that their workers were registered and regularly subjected to controls for sexual disease.

In the early 1900s, there were about 2000 registered prostitutes in Istanbul. In 1946, as tensions with Russia were rising in the Bosporus and Dardanelles, the USS Missouri of the US Navy Sixth Fleet landed in Istanbul, Turkey, and the US sailors were warmly welcomed. The city of Istanbul began renovations, especially on the roads leading to Taksim and Beyoğlu from the Dolmabahçe dock, in preparations to host the US sailors. The famous brothels on Abanoz Street in Beyoğlu had also been renovated and later became a hotspot for the US sailors. In Turkey, the 1946 event with the US Navy was mostly remembered for the prostitution. There was no public criticism during the event, although many years later, the city of Istanbul was criticized for the exaggerated preparations and for meeting "all kinds of needs" of the American sailors. When the USS Forrestal sailed through Turkey in 1969, there were protestors who held signs saying that "Istanbul is Not a Brothel for the Sixth Fleet", in reference to 1946.

Under the Islamist Justice and Development Party (AKP), the granting of licenses have slowed and legal brothels demolished or moved from city centers, according to Foreign Policy, this leaves women at greater risk of arrest, violence and harassment. Foreign Policy attributed this policy to the AKP's wish to present a pious Islamic image of the country.

In Muslim Turkey, prostitution is seen as a way for a few women to protect others' from male lust.

== Legal status ==
Prostitution in Turkey is regulated under article 227 of the Turkish Penal Code (Law No. 5237). Promoting prostitution is punishable by two months to four years' imprisonment. The passport law forbids entry to Turkey for the purposes of prostitution.

Brothels (Genelev) are legal and licensed under health laws dealing with Sexually transmitted infections. Women need to be registered and acquire an ID card stating the dates of their health checks. It is mandatory for registered prostitutes to undergo regular health checks for sexually transmitted diseases, and the use of condoms is mandatory. The police are allowed to check the authenticity of registered prostitutes to determine whether they have been examined properly and to ensure they see the health authorities if they do not. However, men cannot register under this regulation. Most prostitutes, however, are unregistered, as local governments have made it policy not to issue new registrations.

Other regulations affecting prostitutes in Turkey include the Misdemeanor Law, Article 32. However, the application of this law has been quite controversial. In some cities, such as Ankara and Bursa, brothels have been demolished by court order.

Though laws were enacted to regulate prostitution and the spread of venereal diseases, these laws harm sex workers more than benefit them. Sex workers must be tested for STDs twice a week at hospitals designated for registered sex workers. While no law incriminates illegal sex workers, they can still be subjected to a medical examination if caught by law enforcement. Although laws and policies regarding prostitution in Turkey aim to benefit public health, they fail to take into account the rights of sex workers. Despite strict regulations on health checks, the men who pay for sex are not subjected to any medical examination for STDs. This is likely due to the government's efforts to keep brothels open for “men's sexual needs.” The tolerance of male sexuality and the lack of medical examination, punishment, or any penalty for clients who buy sex fuel the growth of the sex business in Turkey.

== Sex work ==
The sex industry in Turkey takes many forms, including escort prostitution, street prostitution, and prostitution conducted in brothels. More specifically, brothels (genelevler), are state-run, with bodyguards appointed by the police. As of 2011, there were about 56 state-licensed brothels.It is estimated that the Turkish sex market includes about 100,000 (legal and illegal). While the sex trade takes many forms, those who work as indoor prostitutes have more advantages than those who engage in street prostitution. This may be attributed to the fact that those who work outdoors are prone to be robbed, harassed, and sexually abused. While indoor prostitution poses a better option, to work indoors, women must be registered, unmarried, and over the age of eighteen.

In addition, women once registered are unable to work outside of the sex industry unless they receive approval from the police. Although the state-run brothels were initially created to regulate the spread of venereal diseases, they now pose a threat to infringing the rights of sex workers. Once women register as sex workers, they are required to register their home address, allowing the police to raid their homes at any moment. Not only do they give up their privacy, but registered sex workers also live in a constant fear of their neighbors and family members finding out their profession, due to the stigma surrounding sex work in Turkey.

A 2010 survey of registered sex workers revealed that 66% were single, 8% married, and 26% were previously married. And on average 25% of registered women completed primary school while only 10% completed middle school. Furthermore, a lack of childcare services and low income contributed to the reasons why many sex workers resorted to sex work. While sex workers are currently being portrayed by the media as "entrepreneurs" and "seekers of happiness," these statistics reveal how the majority of prostitutes felt they had to get into the sex market as a result of various socio-economic factors.

=== Foreign sex work ===
Turkey is considered a top 10 destination country for foreigners due to its lenient visa policy. And as a result of its geographical location, many citizens of neighboring countries are able to travel to Turkey. They can stay from thirty to ninety days, which in turn provides economic benefits to the country. According to the World Tourism Organization, Turkey ranked 7th in 2009 as a destination country for international tourism. However, the Turkish Passport Law “forbids individuals from entering the country solely for the purpose of prostitution” and it is illegal for unregistered workers and foreigners to perform any type of sex work.

Data from 2001 to 2009 reveal that 24,750 voluntary sex workers were deported; of these deportees, 27% were diagnosed with STDs. Many of these migrant and foreign women who are in the sex industry are considered by law to be criminal offenders. Foreign women usually leave their countries in hopes of finding domestic labor to support themselves and their families; however, as a result of the stigmatization they face when arriving in Turkey, they resort to prostitution.

Foreign and migrant sex workers have been painted in the media as the cause of the spread of venereal diseases such as HIV/AIDS. During the late 1980s and 1990s, as the HIV/AIDS crisis was at its peak, media coverage in Turkey portrayed many migrant sex workers as the reason why HIV/AIDS spread across national borders. Migrant and queer sex workers became associated with sexual objects/bodies that caused HIV/AIDS to spread to Turkey. This type of media caused a greater panic in Turkish citizens and the government, eventually leading to police raids of migrant workers' homes, mandatory STD tests, and deportation. Migrant workers to this day are both feared and hated. They are seen as individuals who came to Turkey to steal loyal Turkish husbands and employment.

Male sex work

There are an estimated 11,656 male sex workers in Istanbul, Turkey.

== Transgender sex work ==
Generally, most transgender individuals in Turkey who are in the sex industry experience structural violence and by law are excluded from selling sex legally. Transgender sex workers are the most vulnerable and susceptible to violence and harassment as they are forced to work outside legal institutions. Thus, they typically engage in street prostitution, and many struggle with homelessness and poverty. According to the 2011 report by the Human Resource Development Foundation, there are about 4,000 transgender sex workers in Istanbul and a total of 8,000 to 10,000 trans-women in all major cities in Turkey. According to a study done by NIH in 2021, there are about 30,447 female sex workers and 15,780 transgender sex workers in Istanbul, Turkey. The Global Network of Sex Work Projects found that between 2008 and 2012, thirty-one transgender sex workers were killed in Turkey. According to another study, between 2009 and 2015, thirty-seven transgender homicides were committed. Turkey is known to have the highest transgender homicide rates in all of Europe. However, women who are trans and sex workers, are subjected to the most physical and sexual violence from both clients and police officers.

== Illegal prostitution ==
Illegal prostitution is classified as operating a brothel without being licensed, being a prostitute without having health checkups, being a prostitute without having a license, or being a prostitute without being registered. Operating of illegal prostitution is punishable with a maximum of 1 year's imprisonment.

Indoor prostitution in Turkey is regulated and legal, while escort services are both illegal and unregulated. Clients can go on websites that offer sexual services because these web pages have no age requirement to use them. This enables both clients and sex workers of all ages to use the website as they please. Escorts can work independently from the convenience of their homes or any location of their choosing. This also enables male and transgender sex workers who are not legally allowed to sell sex, to use such platforms to find clients.

== Strip clubs ==
Strip clubs are also present in current Turkey. Strip clubs must also be licensed and strippers must be registered and have regular health checkups. All persons entering strip clubs must be at least 18 years old.

== Sex workers' rights ==
In 2008, activists and sex workers in Turkey announced they were working on a project to establish Turkey's first sex workers' union.

== Demographics ==
Ankara Chamber of Commerce (ATO) report (2004)
| Item | Census data |
|---|---|
| The number of prostitutes | 100,000 |
| Prostitutes are registered in 56 brothels operating | 3,000 |
| Prostitutes registered with the police | 15,000 |
| Women waiting to get licenses | 30,000 |
| Age of prostitution | Between 18 and 40 |
| Annual turnover | $3–4 billion |

== Sex trafficking ==
Turkey is a top destination for victims of human trafficking in relation to the sex trade, according to a report produced by the UNDOC. In 2003 it was estimated that 100,000 women have been sold by family or ex spouses (because of imagined or real transgressions of traditions) into sex work. Syrian females have been exploited by criminals and have been force to engage in sex in the town of Şanlıurfa. Widows have also been targeted. There have been reports according to Walk Free that Yazidi women who were enslaved by ISIS are still held captive in the Mid east, including in Turkey.

The United States Department of State Office to Monitor and Combat Trafficking in Persons ranks Turkey as a 'Tier 2' country. The Turkish government identified 201 sex traffic victims in 2021.

=== Children ===
120 children victims were found by the Turkish government, Walk Free however indicated that the issue is likely not well reported. Walk Free reported that Syrian children, including boys in the border area were at risk of exploitation.

=== Police and mobsters ===
Although some prostitutes are licensed they are tied to a debt bondage system to the brothel in which they work, most of the brothels are managed by mobsters. Some women who have attempted to flee at times were handed back to the brothels by the police.

== See also ==
- Matild Manukyan
