= Prostitutes Protection Act =

Law regulating the prostitution industry in Germany

Prostitutes Protection Act (Prostituiertenschutzgesetz)

Bundestag
- Long title: Law on the regulation of prostitution and the protection of persons working in prostitution (Gesetz zur Regulierung des Prostitutionsgewerbes sowie zum Schutz von in der Prostitution tätigen Personen)
- Citation: Text of the Law (In German)
- Territorial extent: Germany
- Enacted: 21 October 2016
- Commenced: 1 July 2017

The Prostitutes Protection Act (Prostituiertenschutzgesetz) is a German Federal Law that was enacted on 21 October 2016 and came into force on 1 July 2017. Core elements are the introduction of a permit requirement for all prostitution trades and a registration certificate for prostitutes (colloquially "whore pass" or "whore ID"). The intent of the law was to better protect prostitutes and fight crime. Interest groups criticized the law, which they claim penalizes and endangers prostitutes and a constitutional complaint was filed in June 2017.

== Contents ==
=== Regulations for prostitutes ===
As of 1 July 2017, the law requires those who wish to pursue prostitution in Germany to register their activities with the competent authority (§ 3 ProstSchG).

There will be an information discussion, in which the notifying person should be informed about the social legislation in Germany, about counselling services and the contents of the new law (§§ 7 and 8 ProstSchG). After completion of prescribed health advice (§10 ProstSchG), a registration certificate is issued - colloquially and by some interest groups "whore ID" or "whore pass" - which includes a photo (§§5 & 6 ProstSchG). The registration certificate is valid for two years; for prostitutes under the age of 21, it is valid for only one year (§5(4) ProstSchG). In the case of renewal of the registration certificate, it must be shown that a health consultation took place annually - for prostitutes under the age of 21 every six months - (§5(5) parts 2 and 3 ProstSchG).

Upon request, the Office may issue a supplementary alias attestation, in which the real name is replaced by a pseudonym to protect the identity of the person (§5 Abs. 6 ProstSchG).

The information about the registration confirmation is sent automatically in electronic form to the responsible tax offices (§34 Abs. 8 ProstSchG).

The law stipulates that the authority responsible for counselings "arranges for the measures necessary for the protection of the person" if there are indications that a person is not pursuing prostitution of his own free will or is being forced to do so (§9 ProstSchG ).

=== Prostitution Trade ===
The Prostitutes Protection Act regulates the operation of prostitution sites, the provision of prostitution vehicles, the organisation and implementation of prostitution events, and prostitution introductions (§2 Abs. 3 ProstSchG). All new commercial activities are required to present an operating concept to the competent authority with any application for a permit (§12 ProstSchG).

Permits are granted only if the authority affirms the authorisation, (§14 ProstSchG) and the applicant appears reliable to the officials ( § 15 ProstSchG), which is checked by obtaining information from the Federal Central Register (certificate of good conduct) and obtaining police information. Any person who, in the past 5 years, has been convicted of crimes or offences against sexual orientation, assault, forced prostitution, extortion, money laundering, fraud or has been convicted of violations of the Residence Act, is not considered reliable and therefore can not operate a prostitution business in Germany. Additionally, persons who belong to unapproved banned clubs or have belonged in the last 10 years, are usually not regarded as reliable.

The operator of a prostitution business has to fulfil the health and safety protection of employed prostitutes, ensure the admissibility of their employment and also further information, control and recording obligations (§§24 to 28 ProstSchG).

=== Prohibitions, sanctions ===
The law introduced a requirement of condom use (§32(1) ProstSchG). Advertising for certain sexual services, such as sexual intercourse without a condom or with a pregnant women, is prohibited in the cases mentioned in Section 32(3) ProstSchG.

Violations of regulations can be punished with fines up to €10,000; if customers violate the obligation to pay fees, fines of up to €50,000 are possible (§33 ProstSchG).

== Background and introduction ==
During the government of Gerhard Schröder, the Prostitution Act was passed in 2001. This abolished the immorality of prostitution on 1 January 2002, which for the first time prostitutes and their clients could enter a legally effective prostitution agreement. Prostitutes could now obtain access to social security. Critics described this law as too liberal, it made Germany the "brothel of Europe", while defenders saw the shortcomings in the implementation. They also argued that effective protection for prostitutes is only possible if this work is legalised.

In its coalition agreement, the SPD, the CDU and the CSU decided in 2013 to regulate and introduce "regulatory control options" on the one hand "to better protect women from trafficking and forced prostitution " and on the other to "punish the perpetrators more consistently". In the summer of 2014, the coalition partners agreed on the introduction of a notification and a ban on so-called flat-rate brothels and group sex. The demand of the Union to reintroduce compulsory medical examinations for prostitutes, was as well as the requirement for a minimum age of 21 years was not included in the law. These demands had been criticised in an open letter after their becoming known by women's and social organisations (including German Women's Council, German Lawyers Association, Diakonie and German Aidshilfe) as inappropriate.

In the explanatory memorandum to the bill, which the Federal Government submitted to the Bundestag in May 2016, it was explained that prostitution was "an economic sector in which substantial revenues are generated and which [...] follow the intrinsic laws of the market economy". However, prostitution is also "an area in which fundamental rights such as sexual self-determination, personal freedom, health and personal rights of those involved are in fact at particular risk." In particular, it lacks "binding minimum standards for the protection of the health and safety of those working there" and legal bases for controlling the operators of prostitution trades. Lack of regulatory oversight instruments favoured criminal structures. At the same time "it must be taken into account that frequently prostitution is carried out by persons who are in a particularly vulnerable or stressful situation and who are therefore unable to defend their rights in an autonomous manner. Many [prostitutes] also fear discrimination in their social environment when their work is [...] known ". These characteristics should be taken into account in the regulation of the prostitution industry. The aim of the Prostitution Protection Act is to "better protect prostitutes and strengthen their right to self-determination, to [...] create the basis for ensuring tolerable working conditions and health [...]" and "to fight human trafficking, violence against prostitutes and exploitation of prostitutes and pimping".

While some states welcomed the introduction of a permit requirement for prostitution, a number of states spoke out against the law. In addition to the obligation to register, the costs incurred by the State were criticised, which the German government estimated at 17 million euros. On the other hand, the planned regulation of brothels received widespread approval.

The bill was slightly tightened by the Family Committee of the Bundestag at the request of the coalition parties (advertising ban on sex with pregnant women) and adopted by the Parliament on 7 July 2016 with the support of the Grand Coalition.

== Implementation and effects ==
The implementation of the law is the responsibility of the states and municipalities. Many states - including Baden-Württemberg, Berlin, Hamburg, Rhineland-Palatinate and Saxony - were unable to create the necessary structure by 1 July 2017, in particular to hire the necessary staff. In Munich, according to city officials, three doctors, a social worker and two administrative staff had to be hired by the health department. Added to this were "eight posts plus management for the registration and nine posts for the review of the brothels", which alone costs 1.5 million euros.

Some federal states charge a fee for registration and mandatory health advice. In Bavaria, a fee of 35 euros each for registration and counselling is changed, and in Saarland a 35 Euro registration fee. In Baden-Württemberg, Hamburg, Mecklenburg, North Rhine-Westphalia and Schleswig-Holstein applications and health advice are free.

== Criticism ==
Shortly before the introduction of the law, the Berlin prostitute counselings centre and advisory board Hydra criticised that the obligation to register had "created a horrendous fear" because it was unclear what happened to the data and who had access to it. In particular, there were fears that correspondence between the authorities and the prostitute would deprive members of their activities, especially for those migrant women who could only give a foreign address. Similar reservations existed with regard to the "whore pass". If the anonymous and covert practice of prostitution is legally no longer possible, illegality threatens. This criticism also shared by the Berufsverband erotische und sexuelle Dienstleistungen (Professional association erotic and sexual services).

The importance of anonymity for prostitutes was underlined by the head of the prostitution advisory centre of the Diakoniewerk Hamburg, Julia Buntenbach-Henke: "[...] The result of an outing is for many [...] social isolation". However, the intention of the law to achieve "more self-determination for women in prostitution" was criticised in the implementation. Women who did not register would no longer report violent incidents to the police, as they feared they would be punished for the illegal practice of prostitution. The assumption that a woman would report a dependency relationship to the authorities - this argument was advocated by the Lower Saxony Social and Women's Minister, Cornelia Rundt (SPD) in 2015 - was dismissed by Buntenbach-Henke as "pure utopia." This opinion was also expressed by the Bundestag member Cornelia Möhring (Die Linke ), who, after the passing of the law by the Bundestag, criticised that a "one-time short contact with the authority" was barely sufficient to establish a relationship of trust. On the other hand, qualified advice is necessary.

The CDU deputy Sylvia Pantel countered the critics in September 2014, saying this does not stigmatise, but was "something that is quite normal for other workers." Prostitution can not be recognised as a "normal service offer" if there is no registration and control. The law should help those women who worked dependently and so far were defenceless. In a similar vein, Minister of Family Affairs Manuela Schwesig (SPD) said after the law had been passed that the obligation to register was not aimed at self-directed sex workers, but necessary to protect women who were lured to Germany and then disappeared in brothels.

The North Rhine-Westphalian Minister of Health and Emancipation, Barbara Steffens (Greens), argued against this view as early as 2015 in a statement on the draft bill submitted at that time. On the one hand, the draft "does not clear enough between the fight against trafficking and the regulation of prostitution", on the other hand, experiences from Vienna, where there was already a registration obligation, show that those victims of trafficking who are duly registered, assume that "their exploitation is legal and legitimised by the state".

In addition, Steffens criticized her counterpart, the Bremen Social Senator Anja Stahlmann (Greens), in that the state takes the law with the right to label women and men as prostitutes. According to Steffens, the proposed law includes an "almost boundless definition of prostitution"; This included people who occasionally provided sexual services. Even the Tantra Massage federation criticised the definition of "prostitution" being too broad: "Any kind of professional contact in the genital area as unskilled and often involuntary prostitution fits more in the spirit of the 50s and 60s [...]." Tantric masseurs now face a legal uncertainty and might only be allowed to act with a registration certificate.

The Frankfurt-based Doña Carmen association, together with 15 brothel operators and a few clients (26 in total) filed a constitutional complaint with the Federal Constitutional Court in June 2017 against the Prostitute Protection Act. The complaint written by the Berlin constitutional lawyer Meinhard Starostik, was directed in particular against the obligation to register and advise, which is contrary to the constitution. All prostitutes would be under suspicion. In addition, according to Starostik, the lack of condoms is an "inadmissible interference with the intimate personal sphere", which makes it unreasonable for the brothel operators to be in control. Such comprehensive regulation as the Prostitute Protection Act applies "no other profession" and given that 200,000 people work in this industry, in 2015 nationwide there were only 72 convictions for pimping, trafficking and exploitation of prostitutes, these regulations are not necessary. The Federal Constitutional Court rejected the adoption of the 2018 action because it was insufficiently reasoned. The Frankfurter Rundschau announced in February 2019, Doña Carmen has filed a lawsuit against the Prostitute Protection Act at the European Court of Human Rights in Strasbourg.
