= Im Winkel =

Street in Bochum, Germany

Street in Bochum, Germany
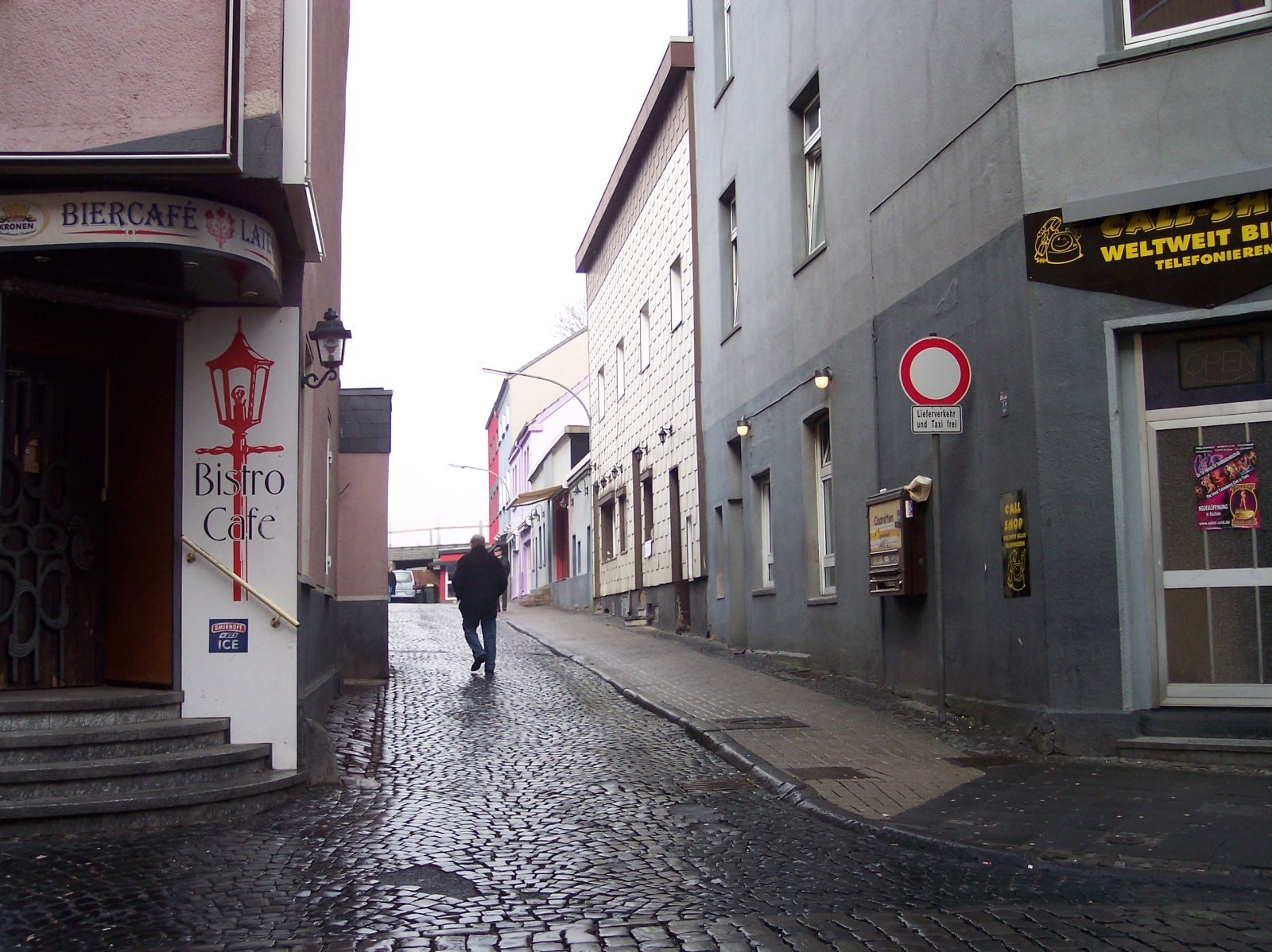
- Entrance to Im Winkel
- Interactive map of Im Winkel
- Former name: Maarbrücker Straße
- Location: Bochum-Mitte, Bochum, North Rhine-Westphalia, Germany
- Coordinates: 51.482248°N 7.209024°E
- From: Gußstahlstraße

Other
- Known for: Prostitution

Im Winkel (German pronunciation: [ɪm ˈvɪŋkl̩], lit. 'In the Corner'), together with Gußstahlstraße, has been the red-light district of Bochum, Germany, since the early part of the 20th century. The local names for the street are "Eierberg", "Gurke" (cucumber, due to its length), "Riemenschleifer" (belt-grinder) or "Riemenwalzwerk" (belt rolling mill).

== History ==
The Hamme district in Bochum had at least eight brothels by the railway tracks on Kurzen Straße (now Sophienstraße) in 1904. In 1912, the Märkischer Sprecher newspaper reported on the city's plans to allow "regulated brothel operations only in the immediate vicinity of the city centre" on what was then Maarbrücker Straße, the street name being changed to Im Winkel in 1929.

== Modern times ==
Layout of Im Winkel

The collection of brothels is designed in the style of a square surrounded by shop windows. Depending on the time of day, 50 to 100 prostitutes offer their services there. A Laufhaus was built at a cost of a million euros and was opened in 2009. The property has 40 rooms on several floors and a pizzeria. The Laufhaus is known locally as the "Eierberg".

The city of Bochum's restricted district ordinance of January 21, 2003 limits prostitution to Im Winkel. On May 31, 2006, the Gelsenkirchen Administrative Court criticised that the wording of the ordinance did not describe the boundaries of the restricted area precisely enough.

Im Winkel is located in the Bochum-Mitte district, close proximity to the site of the mining group Bochum Association of West Park and the Centennial Hall.

The organic structural structure of the location can be described as a special feature, since an almost village atmosphere is created by several alleys and squares.

The Madonna Association (Madonna e.V.) offers on-site advice for prostitutes. Madonna was founded in 1991 and is jointly funded by the North Rhine-Westphalia Senate and the city of Bochum. Following the enlargement of the EU in 2007, the number of foreign prostitutes working in the area increased. A 2008 investigation into an international prostitution ring based in Bochum led to the discovery of match-fixing and ultimately to the 2009 European football match-fixing scandal.

In 2013 Madonna reported that 60% of the prostitutes in the area are from Eastern Europe, especially Romania and Bulgaria.

== See also ==
- Prostitution in Germany
