= Drei-Farben-Haus =

Oldest brothel in Stuttgart, Germany

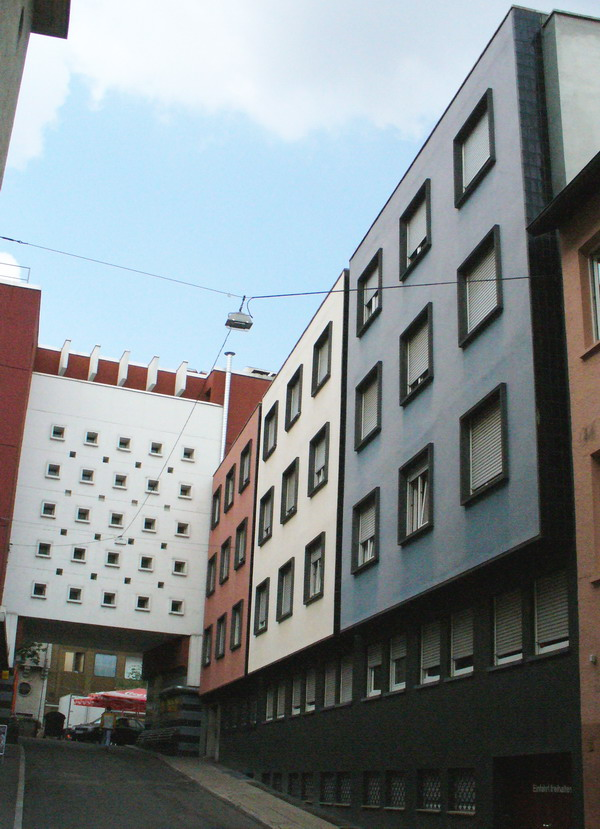
- Exterior showing the red, white and blue that give the property its name
- Interactive map of Drei-Farben-Haus
- Former names: Hotel Garni
- Address: Am Bebenhäuser Hof
- Location: Stuttgart, Germany
- Coordinates: 48°46′30″N 9°10′36″E

Construction
- Opened: 17 February 1957

Website
- www.3farbenhaus.de

The Drei-Farben-Haus (three-colour house) is Stuttgart's largest and oldest brothel. It is located in Am Bebenhäuser Hof in the lively downtown district between the end of Königstraße and the market square, which contains Stuttgart City Hall.

The name comes from its striking red-white-blue painted façade, the colours of the Tricolour, which was supposed to signify French sensual pleasures and sinfulness. Sixty-seven prostitutes (as of 2017) of various nationalities work in the Laufhaus, which has existed since 1957. The "DFH" is in three connected buildings. There are five floors, including the basement, with up to 24 rooms per house. The numbering of the rooms dates from the time when the hallways of the houses were still separated and the access was only through the courtyard.

== History ==
Before World War II, the nursing home of the Bebenhausen Abbey stood on the site. This was destroyed by the Allied bombing of Stuttgart during the war.

After the war, prostitutes started to use the ruins to meet their clients; they became known as the "rubble prostitutes". Following complaints, the city fathers wanted to rid the streets of prostitutes. Although opposed by 46 local businessmen, Lord Mayor Arnulf Klett issued building permits to build 4 "dormitories" on the site. Three investors built 3 of the buildings and gave over the management of them to a French couple. The fourth "dormitory" was never built.

The house opened on 17 February 1957 as the "Hotel Garni" and 71 prostitutes moved into the building. It was cited as a "model brothel". Herwig Klawe, the then deputy head of the prostitution department at Stuttgart police, described it as "a role model at home and abroad".

The husband of the couple died in 1983 and his wife continued to run the house, including cooking for the prostitutes and selecting new tenants, until old age.

== Interior ==
The interior and the condition inside are typical of the era it was built (1957). The rooms, yellow tiled corridors and stairs are rather functional. The twelve-square-meter rooms are equipped with a sink and furnished according to the services offered and the tastes of the tenant. There is a private cafeteria (which is supposed to smell of pure soap), shared bathrooms, showers and sanitary facilities for the residents.

== Operation ==
The house was built with municipal support, and the municipality laid down conditions for its operation. The prostitutes must work for themselves and pay a fixed fee to rent the rooms, rather than working for the house and giving them a percentage of earnings. None of the prostitutes could be pimped. As the house is technically a dormitory, there are no club rooms or bar. This helps to keep down complaints about noise and rowdy behaviour.

For security, at the entrance and on each of the floors, supervisors oversee the comings and goings. The rooms all have emergency call buttons.

== See also ==
- Prostitution in Germany
