= Pascha (brothel) =

Large brothel in Cologne, Germany

Coordinates: 50°57′20″N 6°56′25″E

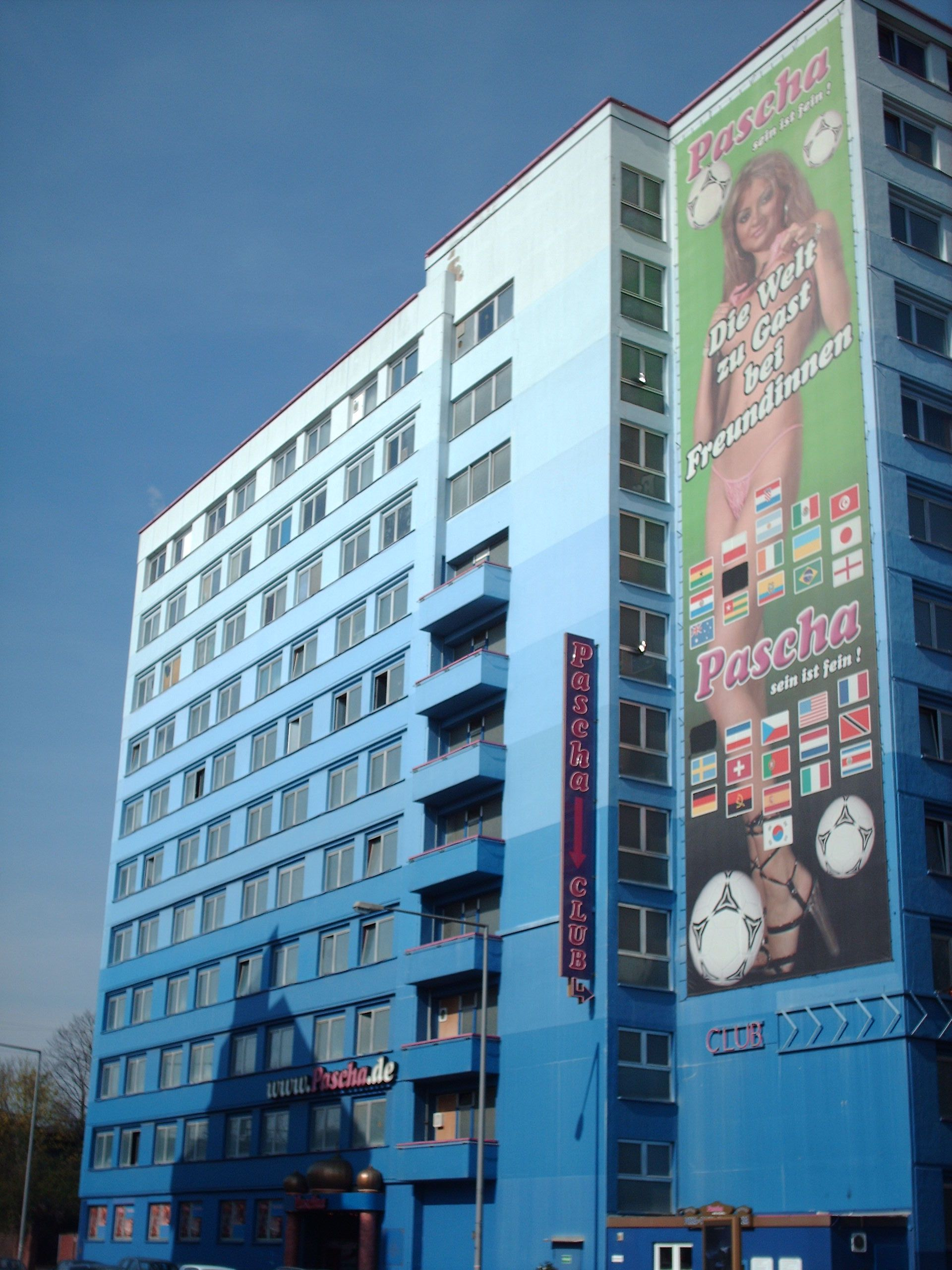
- The Pascha during the 2006 FIFA World Cup, with the Saudi Arabian flag and Iranian flag blacked out on the poster after protests and threats
- Zoomable interactive map
- Address: Hornstraße, Neuehrenfeld
- Location: Cologne, Germany

Construction
- Opened: January 1972 (54 years ago)

Website
- pascha.de

The Pascha is a brothel in Cologne, Germany. It is one of the largest brothels in the world, and the largest in Europe. It has 120 prostitutes, over 80 supporting-role employees, and receives up to 1,000 customers per day.

== History ==
The brothel was opened in January 1972 in the Hornstraße, under the name "Eros Center". It was Europe's first high-rise brothel. The city of Cologne wanted to eliminate the red light district "Kleine Brinkgasse" in the city centre and issued a licence to build the new brothel on land owned by the city in the outskirts of town. The prostitutes sued in an attempt to prevent the closure of the Kleine Brinkgasse area but ultimately lost.

In 1995, the owner of the Eros Center changed after foreclosure, and the new name "Pascha" was introduced. They later added houses under the same name in Salzburg, Munich and Linz.

== Operation ==
The house rents 126 rooms on 7 floors to prostitutes for a fee of 180 Euro per day, which includes meals, medical care, and the 20 Euro tax that authorities collect per prostitute per day (including Cologne's "pleasure tax" of 6 Euro). The women come from many countries; about 30% of them are German. They typically sit outside of their rooms and negotiate with customers who wander the hallways. Some of the women live in their rooms, others rent a second room to stay in, while still others stay in their own apartments in Cologne.

The house is open 24 hours a day; customers of the prostitutes pay an entrance fee of 5 Euro and then negotiate directly with the women, who work independently and keep all of the money. One floor is reserved for low-cost service and another one for transgender prostitutes. The house also contains a regular hotel, a table dance nightclub with separate entrance, several bars, and a separate club-style brothel on the top floor.

In 2003, oral sex and intercourse cost about 50 Euro. The brothel advertises a money-back guarantee in the case of unsatisfactory service.

== Incidents ==
In June 2003, a Thai sex worker was stabbed to death by a customer in the Pascha; she managed to press the alarm button in her room and security personnel caught the murderer. In January 2006, another sex worker was attacked by a customer with a knife. The woman working next-door alerted security and the perpetrator was caught; the victim survived.

In 2004, a German prostitute claimed that Eminem visited the brothel before taking her back to another nearby hotel for sex.

After a police raid of the brothel in April 2005, it was reported that a gun and some cocaine was found and 23 people were arrested, most of them because of suspected violation of immigration laws. Further it was reported that four of the prostitutes were between 14 and 15 years old. The brothel was not fined however, since the girls, who were from Africa, looked older and carried fake documents showing an older age.

It was reported that, in August 2005, two women, 19 and 29 years old, had rented two rooms in the Pascha and announced over the internet that they would pay any man 50 Euro for sex; the goal was to find out who could have more partners in one day. In the end they had sex for 11 hours with a total of 115 men, and about 1,700 others had to be turned away. The German tabloid Bild turned the story into a headline the next day. The women insisted that they had paid the men from their own vacation money and had not received any compensation from Bild or Pascha. The 19-year-old woman later worked in the club brothel of Pascha.

Before the 2006 FIFA World Cup in Germany, Muslims protested that the brothel insulted Islam when it advertised using a 24-metre-high by 8-metre-wide poster, mounted on the side of its building, showing a half-naked woman and the flags from all of the countries which qualified to compete for the World Cup. The slogan on the poster read Die Welt zu Gast bei Freundinnen ("The world as guest with girlfriends"), a pun on the slogan for that year's World Cup, Die Welt zu Gast bei Freunden ("The world as guest with friends"). The protesters compared the poster to the Jyllands-Posten Muhammad cartoons. In response to the protests, and threats of violence, which began on 21 April 2006, the owners blacked out the flags of Saudi Arabia and Iran (both of which include words from the Quran), though the flag of Tunisia (which does not show any scriptural text) was left alone.

In March 2007, the Pascha announced that senior citizens above the age of 66 would receive a discount during afternoons; half of the price of 50 Euro for a "normal session" would be covered by the house.

In September 2007, a Turkish customer tried to set fire to the Pascha by igniting gasoline in the entrance area; he also carried a number of Molotov cocktails. He had earlier had a conflict with a prostitute and security personnel and returned with 10 accomplices. He received a suspended sentence of two years in prison.

In 2008, Pascha offered free entrance for life to the brothel and the night club to men who agreed to have Pascha's logo tattooed on their arm; about forty men took them up on the offer.

In December 2008, three of Pascha's bouncers beat up an Albanian man who supposedly had ignored an order to stay away from the house and who might have been involved in the bouncer scene. The three men received fines and suspended sentences of 18 months for aggravated assault.

In December 2009, American rapper 50 Cent gave a concert in Pascha's night club.

On Mother's Day 2011, the brothel organised a tour for women; female guests are normally not admitted to the establishment.

Pascha's founder, Hermann Müller, was sentenced to 3 years in prison on 4 September 2017. This was for tax evasion in one of his brothels in Munich. The next day, the brothel was raided by about 250 police officers. Prosecutor Rene Seppi refused to give details about the raid, but said it was in connection with "serious charges".

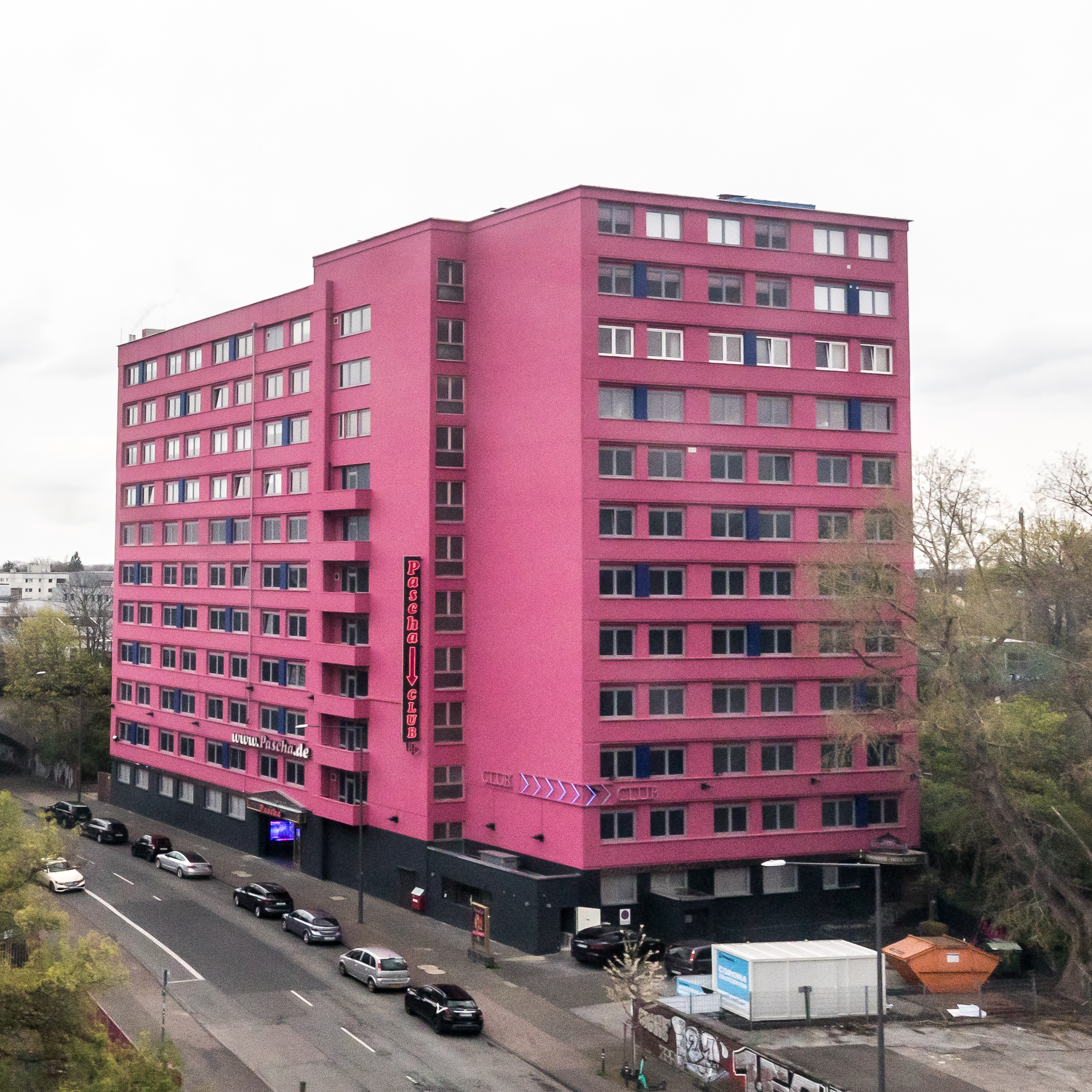
Pascha in April 2022, after its renovation

== COVID closure, bankruptcy, new owner, renovation ==
In September 2020 Pascha filed for bankruptcy protection due to financial losses from COVID-19 restrictions. The closure affected approximately 120 sex workers. After a short reopening, the brothel closed for good in January 2021.

In March 2021, the brothel was sold to a Chinese investor, represented by a German lawyer and another Chinese business man, for eleven million euros. After a renovation, the brothel reopened in March 2022 under a German manager. The top floor had been turned into a hotel.

In June 2024, authorities raided Pascha. Police and tax investigators inspected the premises, concentrating on tax compliance of the sex workers. The owner acknowledged difficulties with tax payments, as he refused to participate in a voluntary system which has brothel owners collect flat daily tax payments from the sex workers up front.

In September 2024, Pascha was seized by authorities, preventing the owners from selling. Prosecutors suspect that the brothel was bought with proceeds from an organized crime ring that had smuggled rich Chinese citizens to Germany. The brothel continued to operate normally.

== Documentary ==
Like a Pascha (2010, Swedish: Som en Pascha) is a documentary film by Svante Tidholm looking at the crisis of masculinity from a feminist point of view. It was filmed at Pascha over the course of three years. The film features interviews with the manager, an employee, a prostitute, and a customer, as well as some footage of a rooftop orgy at the brothel. Tidholm remained critical of the business.

== See also ==
- Prostitution in Germany
