= Prostitution in Germany =

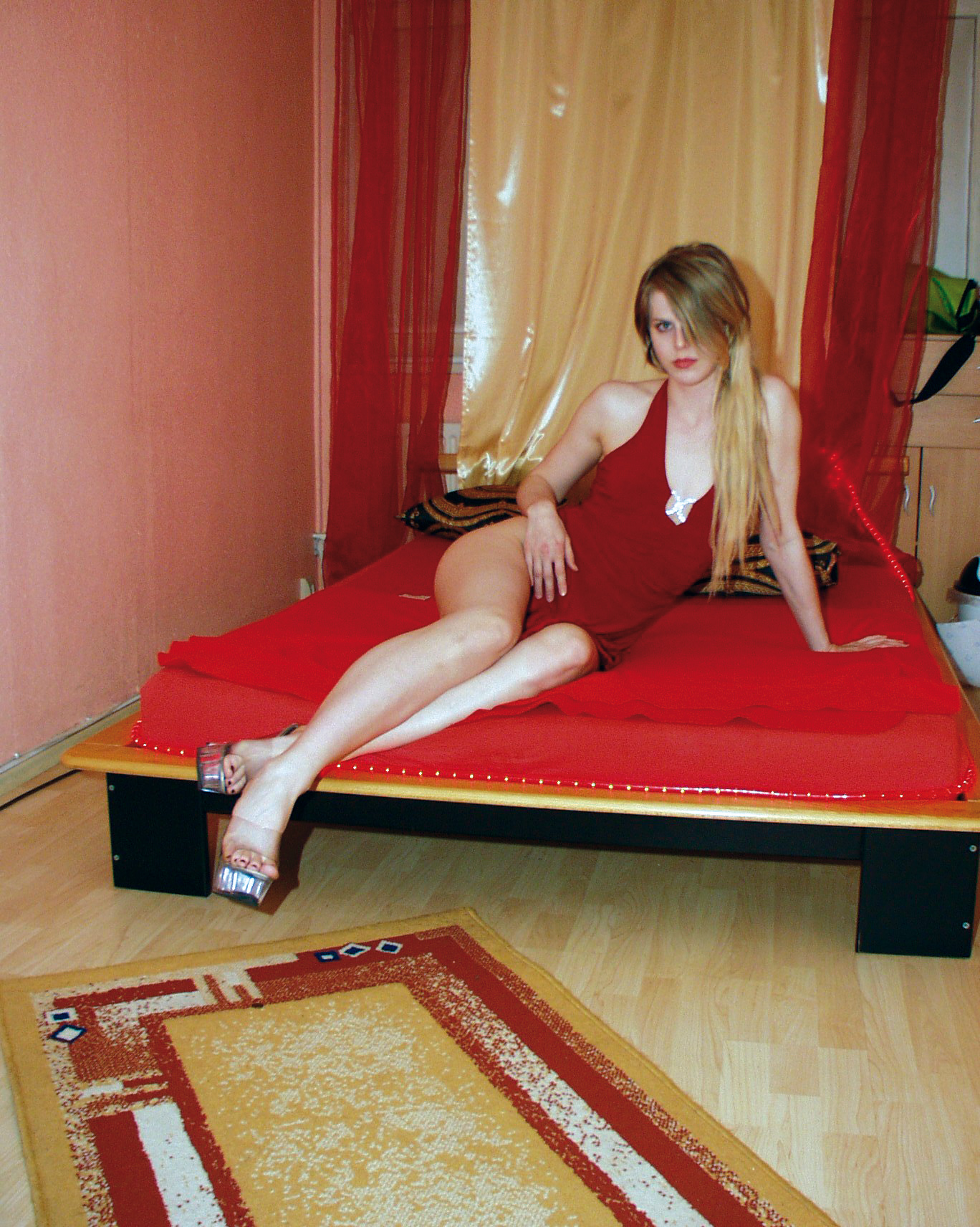
A German prostitute's self-portrait in a brothel

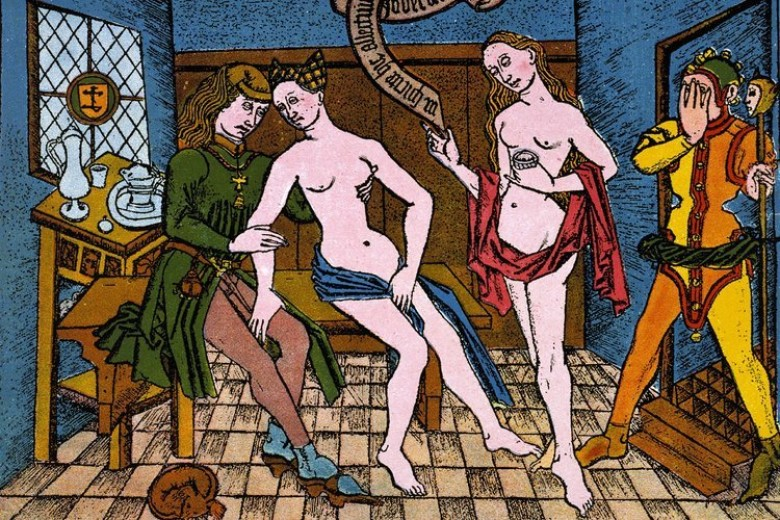
Engraving from the 15th century, Master of the Banderoles

Prostitution in Germany is legal, as are other aspects of the sex industry, including brothels, advertisement, and job offers through HR companies. Full-service sex work is widespread and regulated by the German government, which levies taxes on it. In 2016, the government adopted a new law, the Prostitutes Protection Act, in an effort to improve the legal situation of sex workers, while also now enacting a legal requirement for registration of prostitution activity and banning prostitution which involves no use of condoms. The social stigmatization of sex work persists and many workers continue to lead a double life. Human rights organizations consider the resulting common exploitation of women from Eastern and Southeastern Europe to be the main problem associated with the profession.

== History ==
=== Middle Ages to Confederation (1815) ===
Sex work in historically German lands has never been outlawed and has been described since the Middle Ages. Since the 13th century, several German cities operated brothels known as Frauenhäuser ("women's houses"); the practice of sex work was considered a necessary evil, a position already held by Saint Augustine (354–430). Some municipalities actively encouraged it and far from existing on the margins, sex workers were often honoured guests, who maintained domestic order as an outlet and lesser evil to such things as adultery and rape. The city also gained tax revenues from the prostitutes.

Emperor Sigismund (1368–1437) thanked the city of Konstanz in writing for providing some 1,500 workers for the Council of Constance which took place from 1414 to 1418.

Sex workers were more vigorously persecuted beginning in the 16th century, with the start of the Reformation and the appearance of syphilis. In 1530, Charles V ordered the closure of brothels throughout the German Holy Roman Empire.

Section 999 of the 1794 General State Laws for the Prussian States determined that "dissolute female persons who want to do business with their bodies ... would have to go into the whoredom houses tolerated under the supervision of the state".

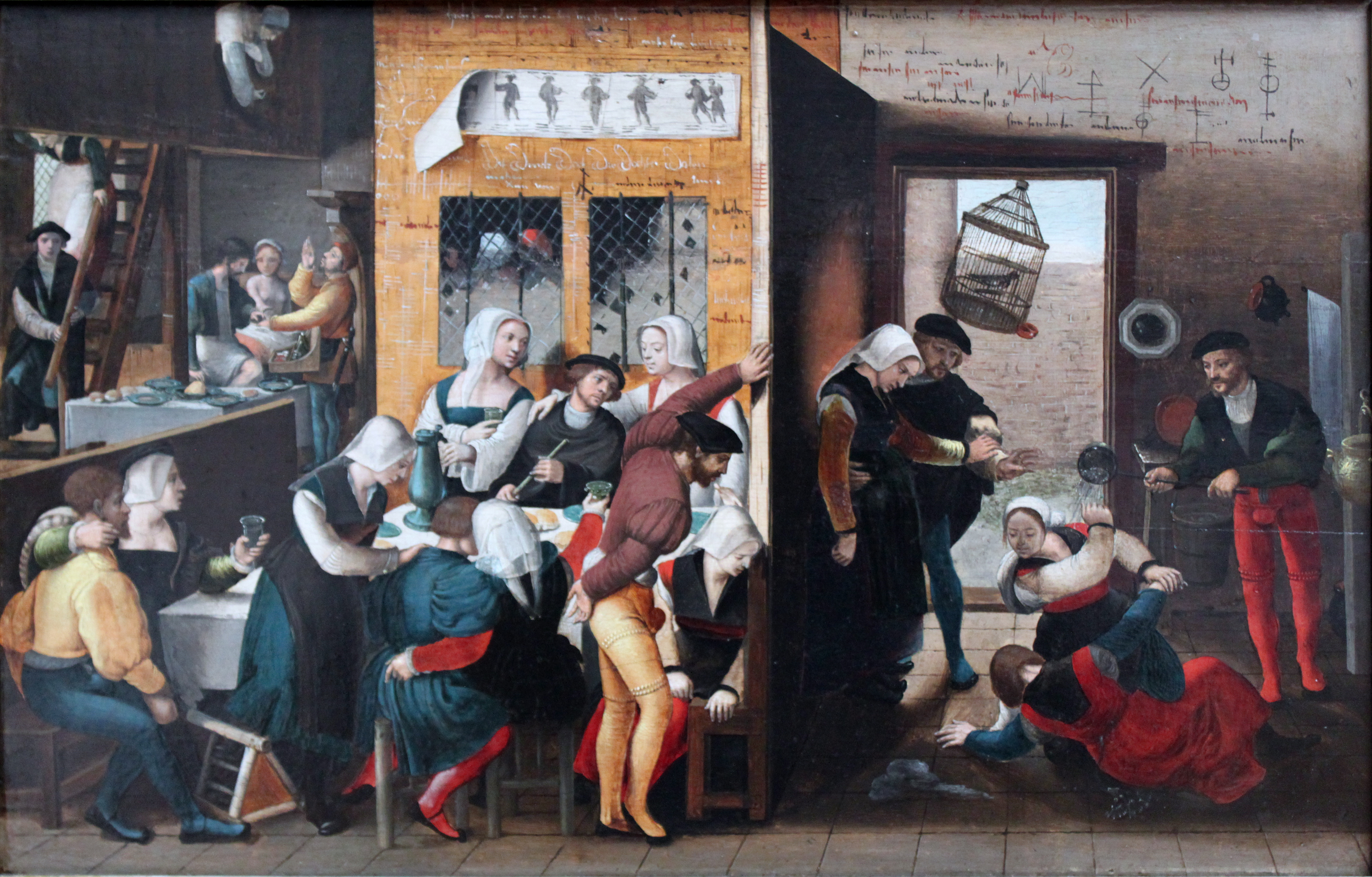
Braunschweiger Monogrammist: Brothel scene 1537

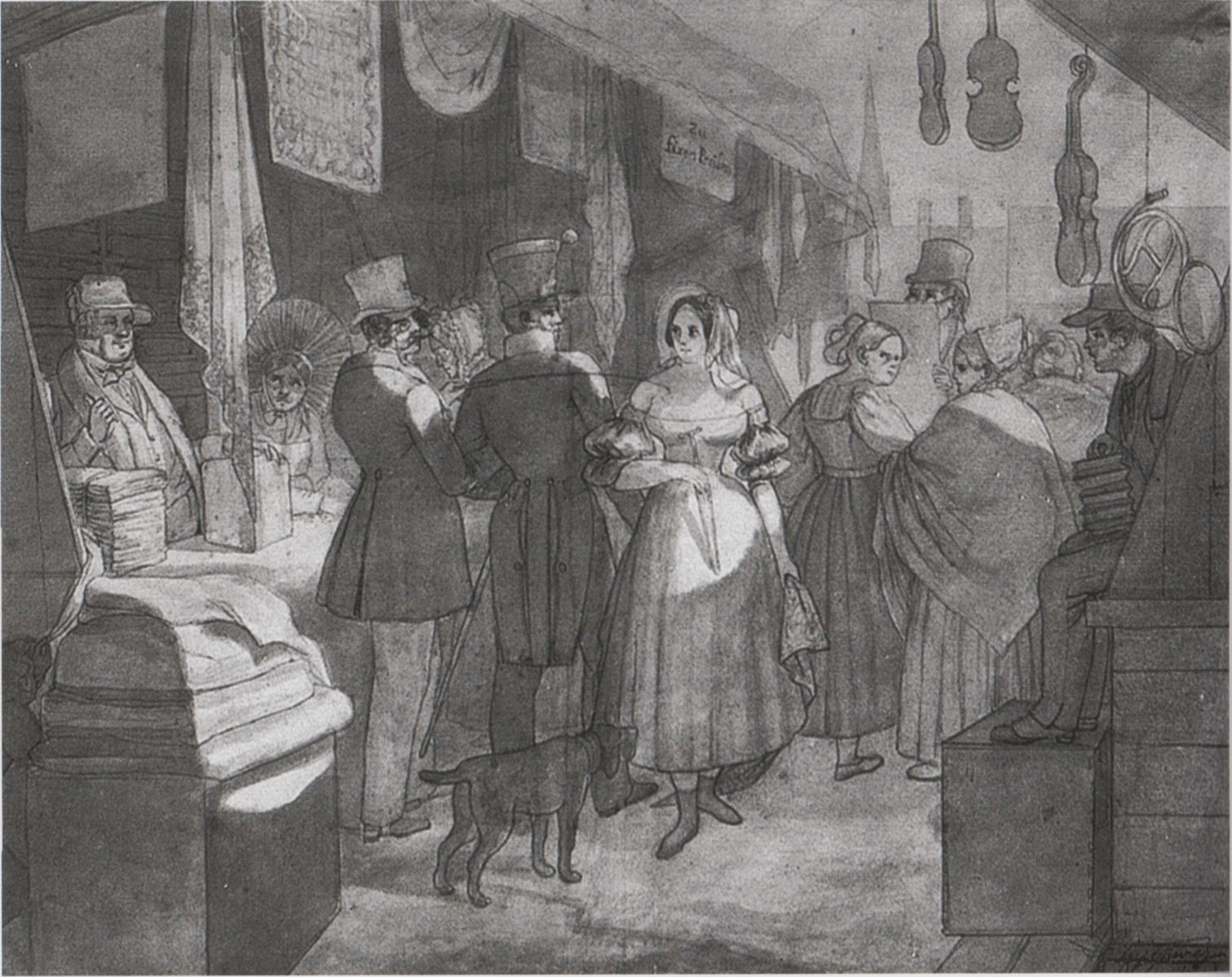
Carl Spitzweg: Auf der Dult c. 1838; sex worker in foreground receiving disapproving glances

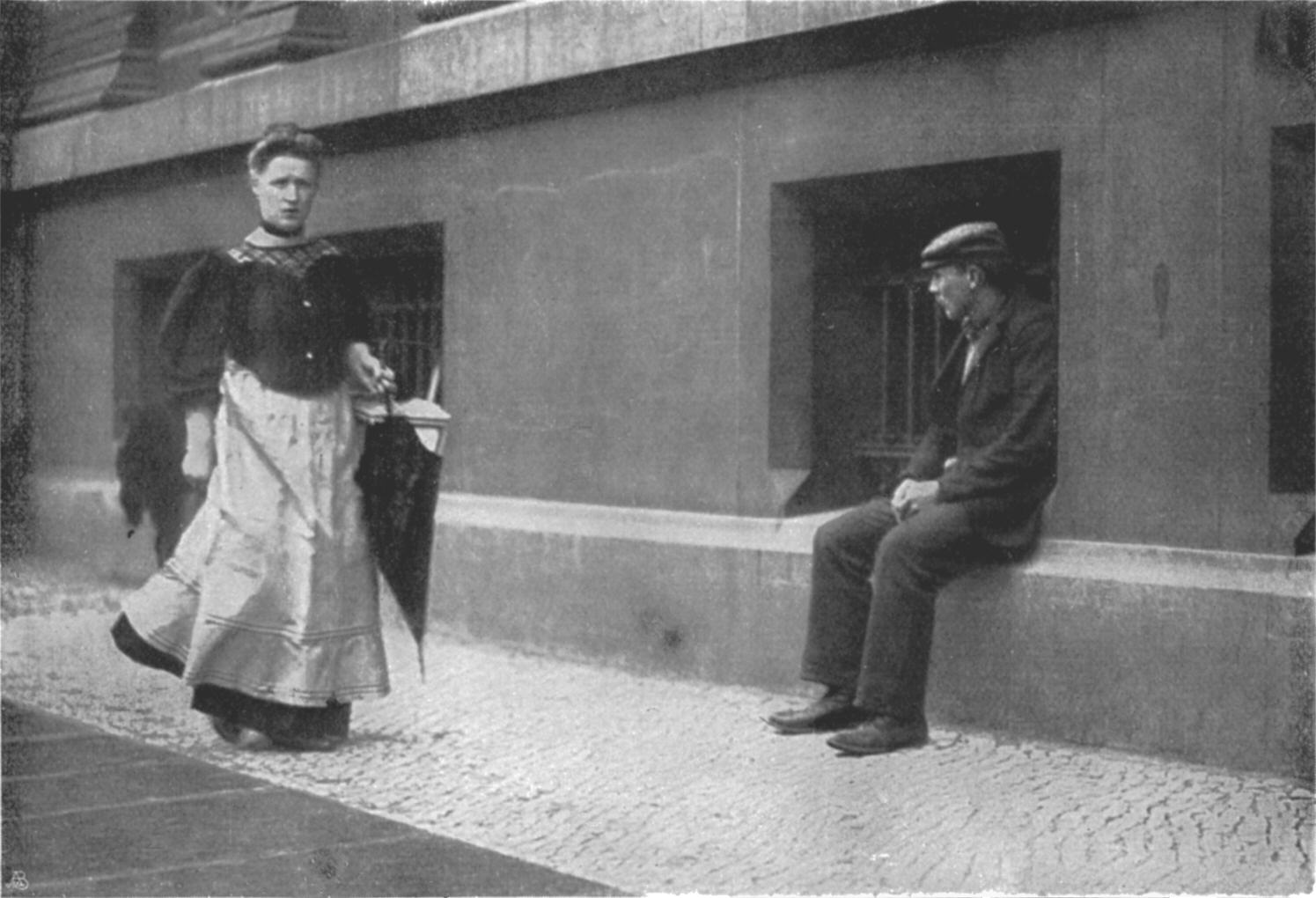
Pimp waiting for a prostitute after her medical check, Berlin, 1890

=== The Confederations (1815–1871) ===
Beginning in the 19th century, sex workers in many regions had to register with police or local health authorities and submit to regular health checks to curb venereal diseases; the so called Regulation System.

The so-called Bremer Regulations of 1852 stated that prostitution was "not a trade in the true sense". By this distinction between prostitution and other trades, immorality of prostitution was defined in law.

=== German Empire (1871–1918) ===
In Imperial Germany (1871–1918) attitudes to sex work were ambivalent. While sex work was tolerated as a necessary function to provide for male sexuality outside of marriage, it was frowned on as a threat to contemporary moral images of women's sexuality. Therefore, state policy concentrated on regulation rather than abolition. This was mainly at the municipal level. The Criminal Code of 1871 prohibited brothels and "commercial fornication". In the 1876 version, prostitution was only punishable if the woman worked outside police supervision. State regulation at the time created an atmosphere which defined what was considered proper, and what was proper feminine sexuality.

Controls were particularly tight in the port city of Hamburg. The regulations included defining the dress and conduct of prostitutes both inside and outside the brothel, thus making the occupation define their lives as a separate class of women on the margins of society.

At the beginning of the 20th century, prostitution was considered "harmful to communities". Nevertheless, there existed or originated in the 20th century, various brothel and red-light districts such as Helenenstraße in Bremen (from 1878), Linienstraße in Dortmund (from 1904), Stahlstraße in Essen (from about 1900), Rampenloch in Minden (from 1908), Im Winkel in Bochum (from about 1912), and the Flaßhofstraße in Oberhausen (from 1910 and 1963). It is estimated that in 1900 there were 50,000 women working in Berlin (population 1 December 1900: 1,888,848).

=== Weimar Republic (1918–1933) ===
In Weimar-era Germany the economy collapsed due to the loss of the First World War and the imposition of war reparations at the Treaty of Versailles. As a result, the middle class lost their savings and the working class were unemployed. The Republic ended up printing money to pay its bills which lead to hyperinflation in 1923. The outcome of all of this was that women, including the millions of war widows, turned to prostitution. Licentiousness and streetwalking were common in this period and Weimar Berlin is famed for its decadence.

On a national scale, prostitution was officially proscribed, but within various locales, polices tolerated prostitutes if they were in state registry. Prostitutes were to have compulsory medical examines for STDs, banned from areas of large public gathering, and were required to give up personal freedoms of private residence, travel, and denying unwarranted search under the German moral police, Sittenpolizei. Unregistered prostitutes arrested for soliciting, or otherwise were not given the same legal protection or voice as average citizens, and due process was not practiced.

The Law for Combating Venereal Diseases was adopted in 1927, which decriminalized prostitution thus undoing the state-regulated system, Reglementierung.

=== Nazi era (1933–1945) ===
During the Nazi era, street based sex workers were seen as "asocial" and degenerate and were at times sent to concentration camps, especially to the Ravensbrück camp. The Nazis did not entirely disapprove of sex work though and instead installed a centralized system of city brothels, military brothels (Wehrmachtsbordelle), brothels for foreign forced laborers, and concentration camp brothels.

During the Second World War, the German Wehrmacht established about 100 Wehrmacht brothels in the occupied territories, including France, Poland, Italy, and Norway. Lothar-Günther Buchheim described his impressions from Brest: "If a large ship had arrived, the hookers simply laid there between sailors." Military prostitution was regulated, "Only a permit from the military command brothel allowed you to visit. Always use a condom (rubber protection). For the German soldiers there was a disinfectant syringe in the urethra."

Between 1942 and 1945, camp brothels were installed in ten concentration camps, including Auschwitz. Himmler intended these as an incentive for cooperative and hard-working non-Jewish and non-Russian inmates, in order to increase the productivity of the work camps. Initially the brothels were staffed mostly with former sex worker inmates who volunteered, but women were also put under pressure to work there. In the documentary film, Memory of the Camps, a project supervised by the British Ministry of Information and the American Office of War Information during the summer of 1945, camera crews filmed women who stated that they were forced into sexual slavery for the use of guards and favored prisoners. The filmmakers stated that as the women died they were replaced by women from the concentration camp Ravensbrück.

None of the women who were forced to work in these concentration camp brothels ever received compensation, since the German compensation laws do not cover persons designated as "asocial" by the Nazis.

In a famous case of espionage, the Nazi intelligence service SD took over the luxurious Berlin brothel Salon Kitty and equipped it with listening devices and specially trained sex workers. From 1939 to 1942 the brothel was used to spy on important visitors.

=== German Democratic Republic (GDR 1945–1990) ===
After World War II, the country was divided into East Germany (German Democratic Republic) and West Germany (the Federal Republic of Germany from 1949–90). In East Germany, as in all countries of the communist Eastern Bloc, full-service sex work was illegal and according to the official position, it did not exist. There were high-class sex workers working in the hotels of East Berlin and the other major cities, mainly targeting Western visitors; the Stasi employed some of these for spying purposes. Street-based workers were available for the pleasure of visiting Westerners, too.

=== Federal Republic of Germany (BRD 1945–2001) ===
In West Germany, the registration and testing requirements remained in place but were handled quite differently in the regions of the country. In Bavaria, in addition to scheduled Sexually transmitted disease (STD) check-ups, regular tests for HIV were required from 1987, but this was an exception. Many sex workers did not submit to these tests, avoiding the registration. A study in 1992 found that only 2.5% of the tested workers had a disease, a rate much lower than the one among comparable non-sex workers.

In 1967, Europe's largest brothel at the time, the six-floor Eros Center, was opened on the Reeperbahn in Hamburg. An even larger one, the twelve-floor building now called Pascha in Cologne was opened in 1972. The AIDS scare of the late 1980s had an effect on the business, and the Eros Center closed, as well as several other brothels in Hamburg. The Pascha continued to flourish, and has evolved into a chain with additional brothels in Munich and Salzburg.

Anything which led to the "promotion of prostitution" (Förderung der Prostitution) remained a crime until 2001, even after the extensive criminal law reforms of 1973. This placed operators of brothels under the threat of potential legal action. Most brothels were, therefore, run as a bar with an attached but legally separate room rental. Many municipalities built, ran and profited from high rise or townhouse-style high-rent Dirnenwohnheime (lit.: "whores' dormitories"), to keep street-based sex work and pimping under control. Here workers sold sex in a room they rented by the day. These establishments, called "Laufhäuser" in Johns' jargon are now mostly privatized and operate as Eros Centers. Even before the 2001 reform, many upmarket sex workers operated in their own apartments, alone or with other women. Luxurious country houses, called "FKK-Sauna-Clubs" are the higher-priced end of prostitution in Germany. There, women and men pay the same entrance fees ranging from about €50 to 100 and usually include meals and drinks and the sex workers negotiate their deals with the individual clients, thus avoiding the appearance of pimping ("Zuhälterei"). Illegal variations on that business model, like "Flatrate-Clubs" and "Pauschalclubs" also exist and advertise openly in daily newspapers and the Internet. These establishments charge an "all-you-can handle" fee of about €75 to €90.

Before the 2002 prostitution law, the highest courts of Germany repeatedly ruled that sex work offends good moral order (verstößt gegen die guten Sitten), with several legal consequences. Any contract that is considered immoral is null and void, so a sex worker could not sue for payment. Sex workers working out of their apartments could lose their leases. Finally, bars and inns could be denied licenses if sex work took place on their premises.

In 1999, Felicitas Weigmann lost the licence for her Berlin cafe Psst!, because the cafe was being used to initiate contacts between customers and sex work and had an attached room-rental also owned by Weigmann. She sued the city, arguing that society's position had changed and sex work no longer qualified as offending the moral order. The judge conducted an extensive investigation and solicited a large number of opinions. In December 2000 the court agreed with Weigmann's claim. This ruling is considered as precedent and important factor in the realization of the Prostitution Law of 1 January 2002. Only after an appeal process though, filed by the Berlin town district, was Weigmann to regain her café license in October 2002.

The compulsory registration and testing of workers was abandoned in 2001. Anonymous, free and voluntary health testing has been made available to everyone, including illegal immigrants. Many brothel operators require these tests.

== Modern era ==
=== Legislative reform (2002) ===
In 2002, a one-page law sponsored by the Green Party was passed by the ruling coalition of Social Democrats and Greens in the Bundestag. The law, the Prostitution Act (Prostitutionsgesetz), removed the general prohibition on furthering full-service sex work and allowed sex workers to obtain regular work contracts. The law's rationale stated that sex work should not be considered as immoral anymore.

The law has been criticized as having not effectively changed the situation of the sex workers, believed to be because some workers themselves don't want to change their working conditions and contracts. The German government issued a report on the law's impact in January 2007, concluding that few sex workers had taken advantage of regular work contracts and that work conditions had improved only for 35% workers.

=== Post 2002 ===
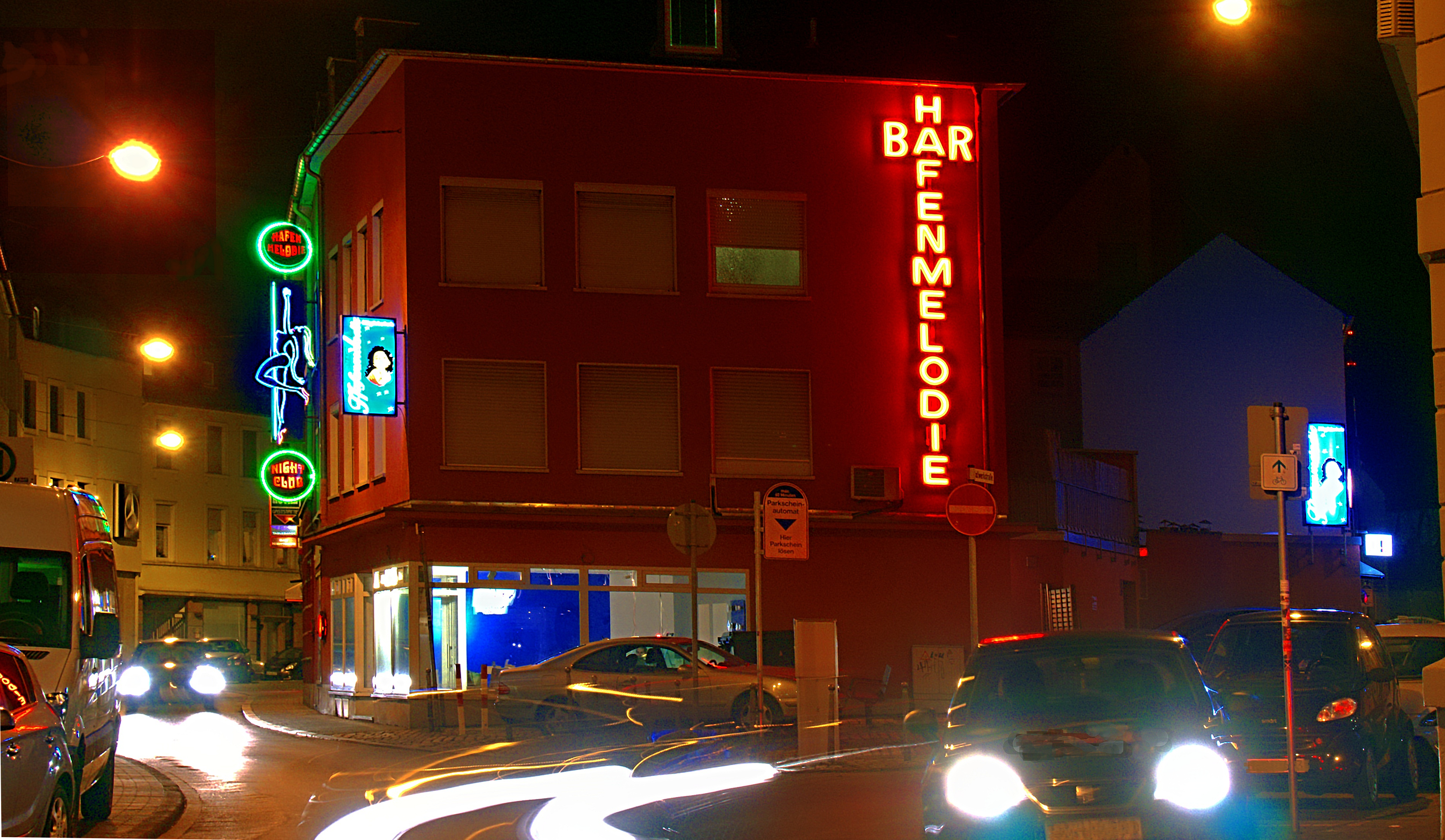
Brothel Hafenmelodie Trier (Germany)

Between 2000 and 2003, the visa issuing policies of German consulates were liberalized. The opposition claimed that this resulted in an increase in human trafficking and sex workers entering the country illegally, especially from Ukraine. The episode led to hearings in 2005 and is known as the German Visa Affair 2005.

In 2004, the Turkish gang leader Necati Arabaci was sentenced to 9 years in prison for pimping, human trafficking, assault, extortion, weapons violations and racketeering. His gang of bouncers controlled the night clubs in Cologne's entertainment district, the Ring, where they befriended girls in order to exploit them as sex workers. After Arabaci's arrest, informants overheard threats against the responsible prosecutor, who received police protection and fled the country in 2007 when Arabaci was deported to Turkey.

In 2004, the large FKK-brothel Colosseum opened in Augsburg, and police suspected a connection to Arabaci's gang, which owned several similar establishments and was supposedly directed from prison by its convicted leader.

After several raids, police determined that the managers of the brothel dictated the prices that the women had to charge, prohibited them from sitting in groups or using cell phones during work, set the work hours, searched rooms and handbags, and made them work completely nude (charging a penalty of €10 per infraction). In April 2006, five men were charged with pimping. The court quashed the charges, arguing that the prostitution law of 2002 created a regular employer-employee relationship and thus gave the employer certain rights to direct the working conditions. Colosseum remained in business.

In early 2005, the media in Great Britain reported that a woman refusing to take a job as a sex worker might have her unemployment benefits reduced or removed altogether. A similar account had appeared in mid-2003; a woman received a job offer through a private employment agency. In this case, the agency apologized for the mistake, stating that a request for a sex worker would normally have been rejected, but the client misled them, describing the position as "a female barkeeper." To date, there have been no reported cases of women actually losing benefits in such a case, and the employment agencies have stated that women would not be made to work in sex work.

In March 2007, the brothel "Pascha" in Cologne announced that senior citizens above the age of 66 would receive a discount during afternoons; half of the price of €50 for a "normal session" would be covered by the house. Earlier, in 2004, a 20% discount for long-term unemployed had been announced by a brothel in Dresden.

Also in 2007, authorities in Berlin began to close several apartment brothels that had existed for many years. They cited a 1983 court decision that found that the inevitable disturbances caused by brothels were incompatible with residential areas. Sex workers' rights groups and brothel owners fought these efforts. They commissioned a study that concluded that apartment brothels in general neither promote criminality nor disturb neighbors.

The 2008 financial crisis and Great Recession led to changes at some brothels. Reduced prices and free promotions are now found. Some changes, the result of modern marketing tools, rebates, gimmicks. Brothels introducing all-inclusive flat-rates, free shuttle buses, discounts for seniors and taxi drivers. "Day passes." Some brothels reportedly including loyalty cards, group sex parties, rebates for golf players. Clients have reported reducing their number of weekly visits.

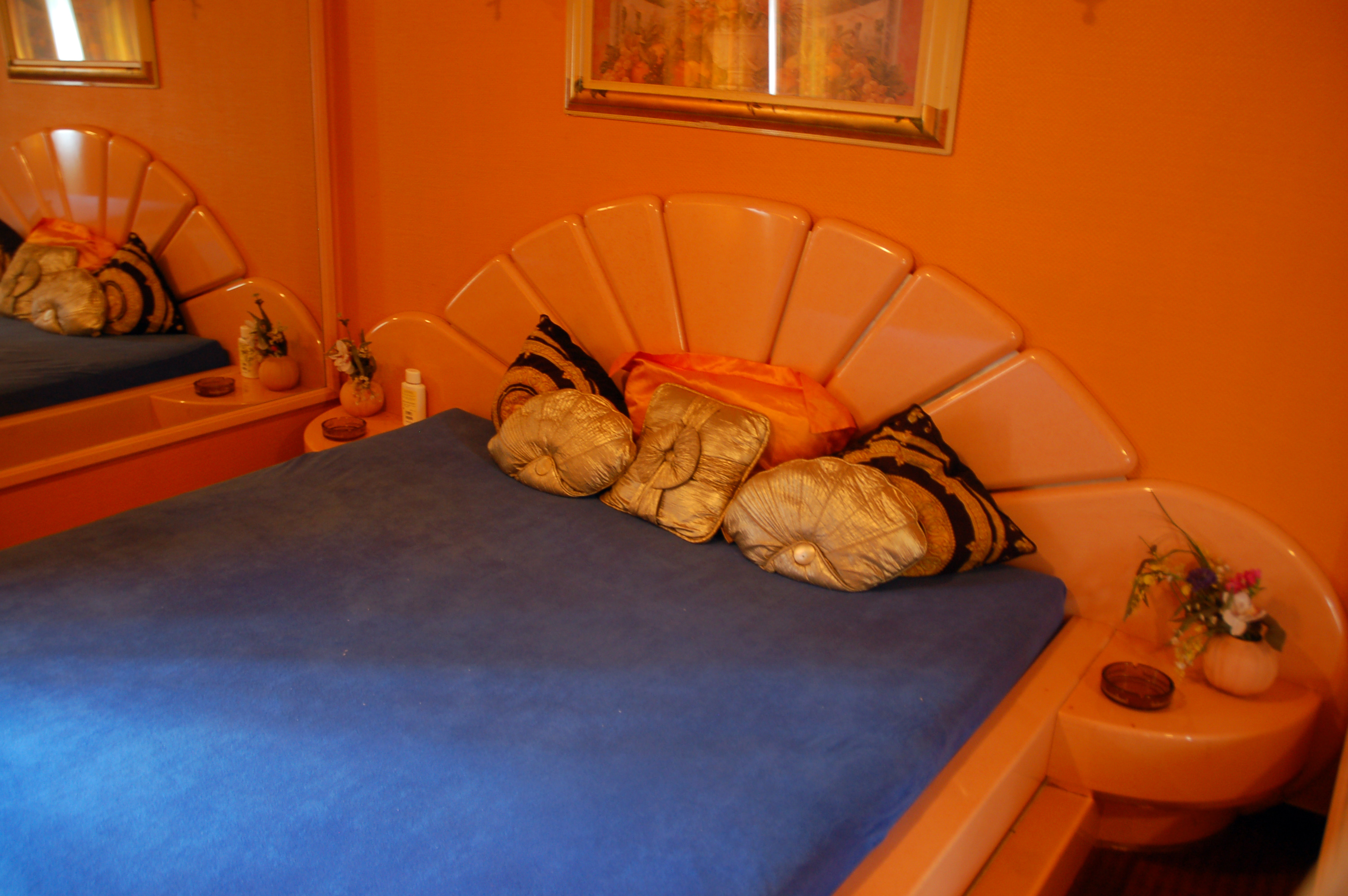
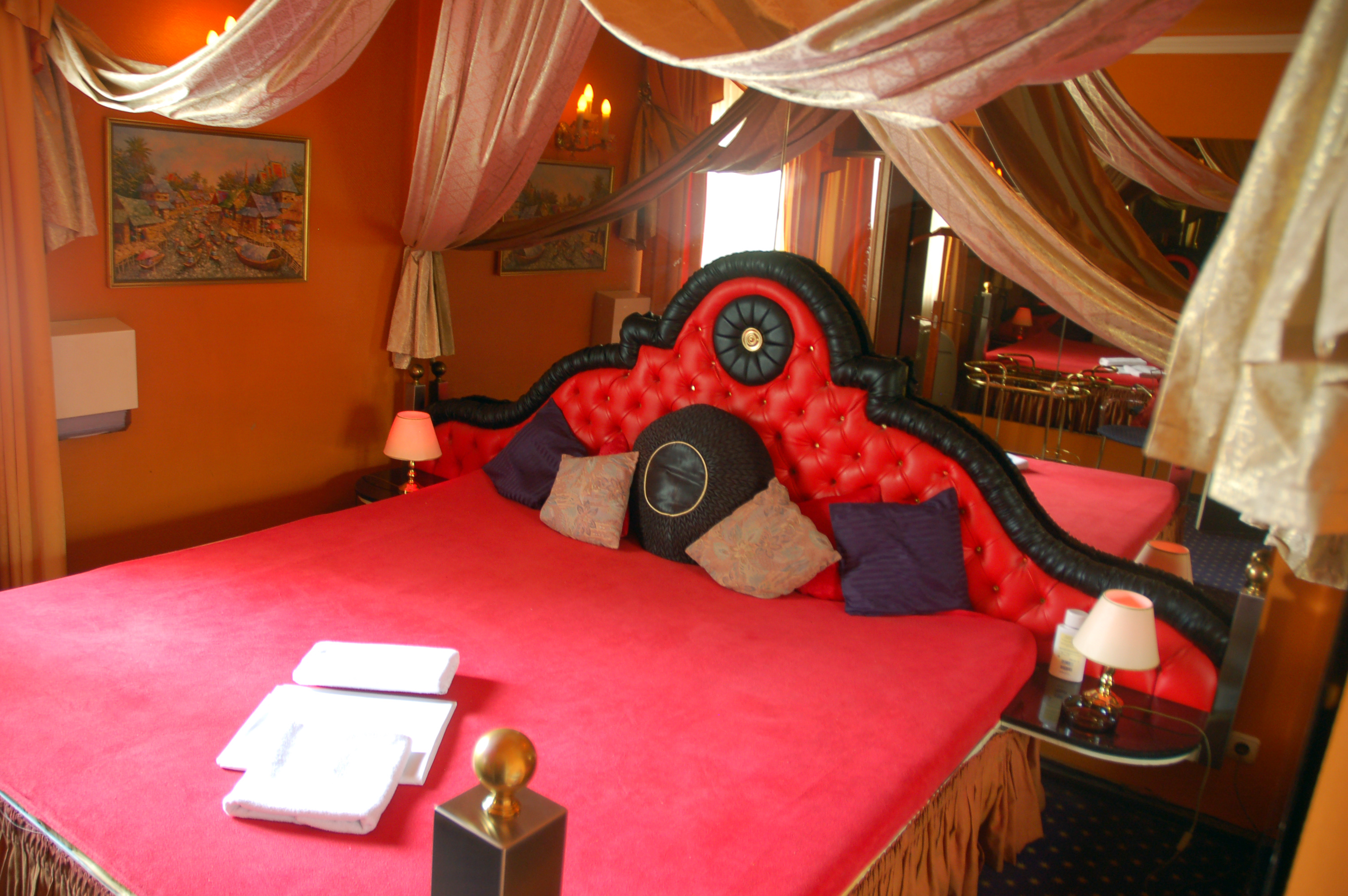
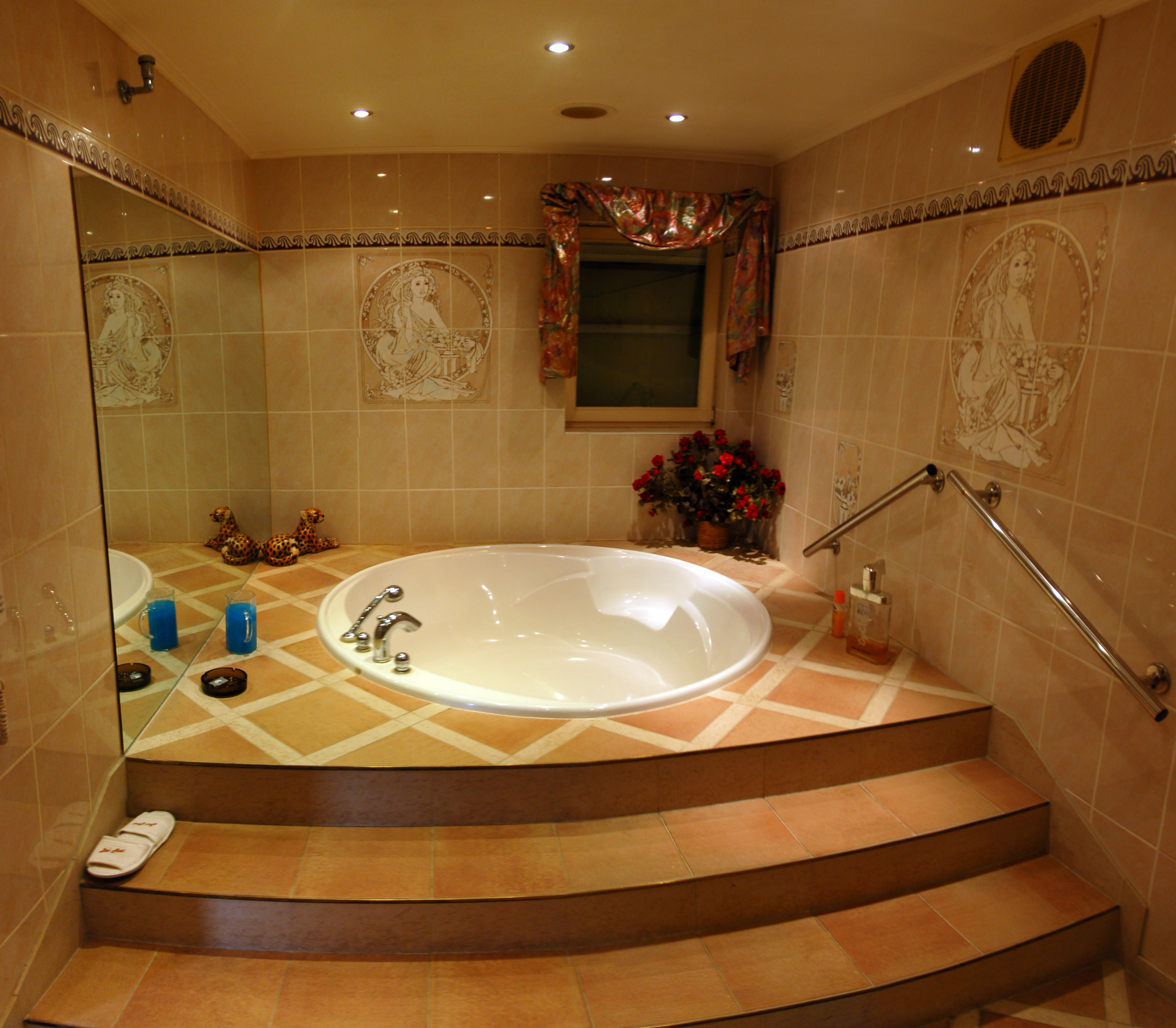
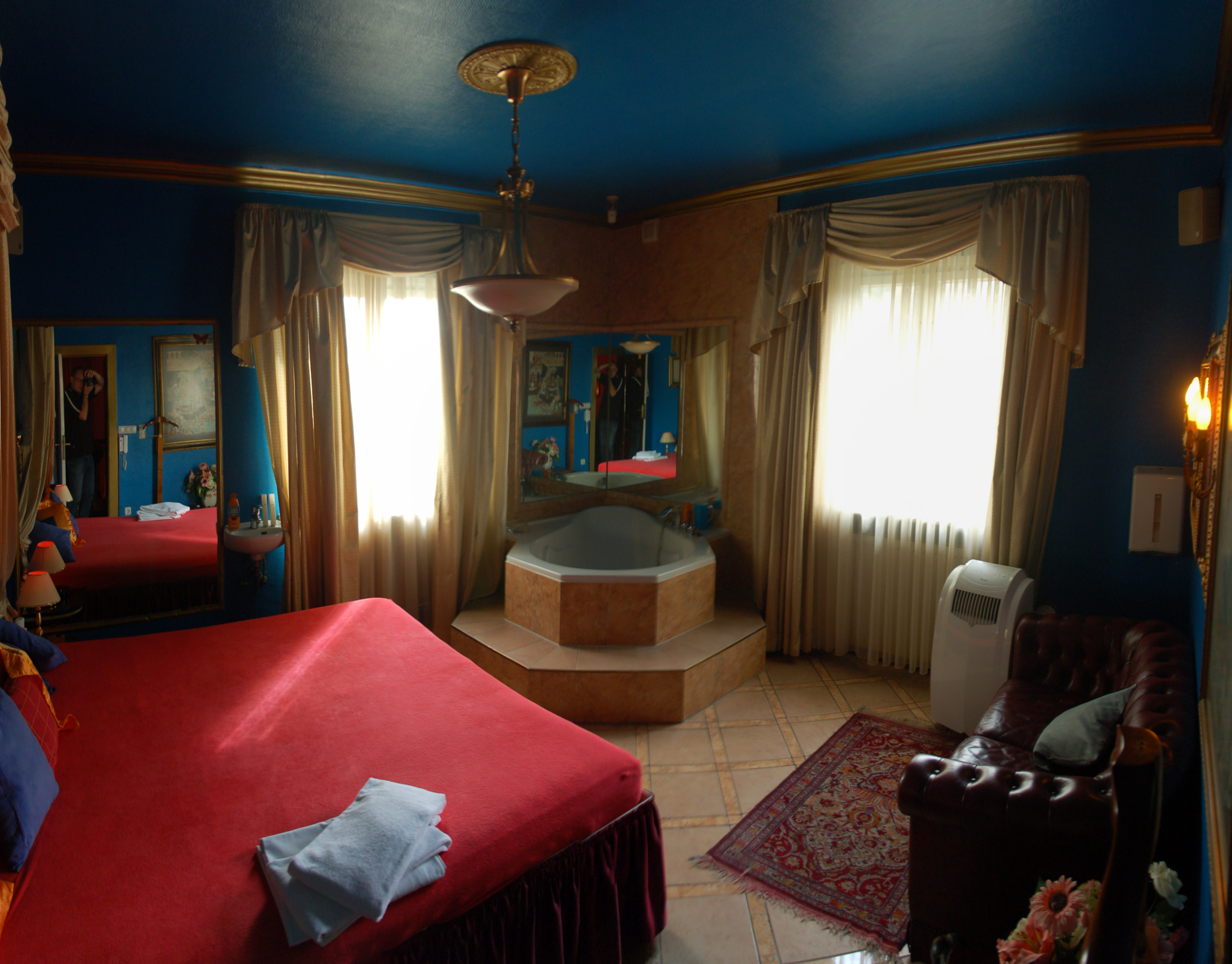
The Berlin Bel ami brothel in October 2009

In 2009, the Bundessozialgericht ruled that the German job agencies are not required to find sex workers for open positions in brothels. The court rejected the complaint of a brothel owner who had argued that the law of 2002 had turned sex work into a job like any other; the judges ruled that the law had been passed to protect the employees, not to further the business.

The effects of the reforms continue to be debated. A five-part series in Der Spiegel in 2013 claimed it was a failure. Others have argued that, while the German model still has many weaknesses, it has reduced violence against sex workers.

In 2014, a startup in Berlin launched Peppr, an app for prostitution.

The Criminal Code was amended in October 2016 to criminalise clients of trafficked or coerced prostitutes. This change was led by Social Democrat Eva Högl.

The Prostituiertenschutzgesetz (Prostitutes Protection Act) came into force in July 2017. Amongst the provision of the Act are registration of prostitutes, annual health checks and mandatory condom use. Brothel operators also need to register and prove their 'good conduct' before registration. The legislation also places restrictions on advertising.

==== Football World Cup 2006 ====
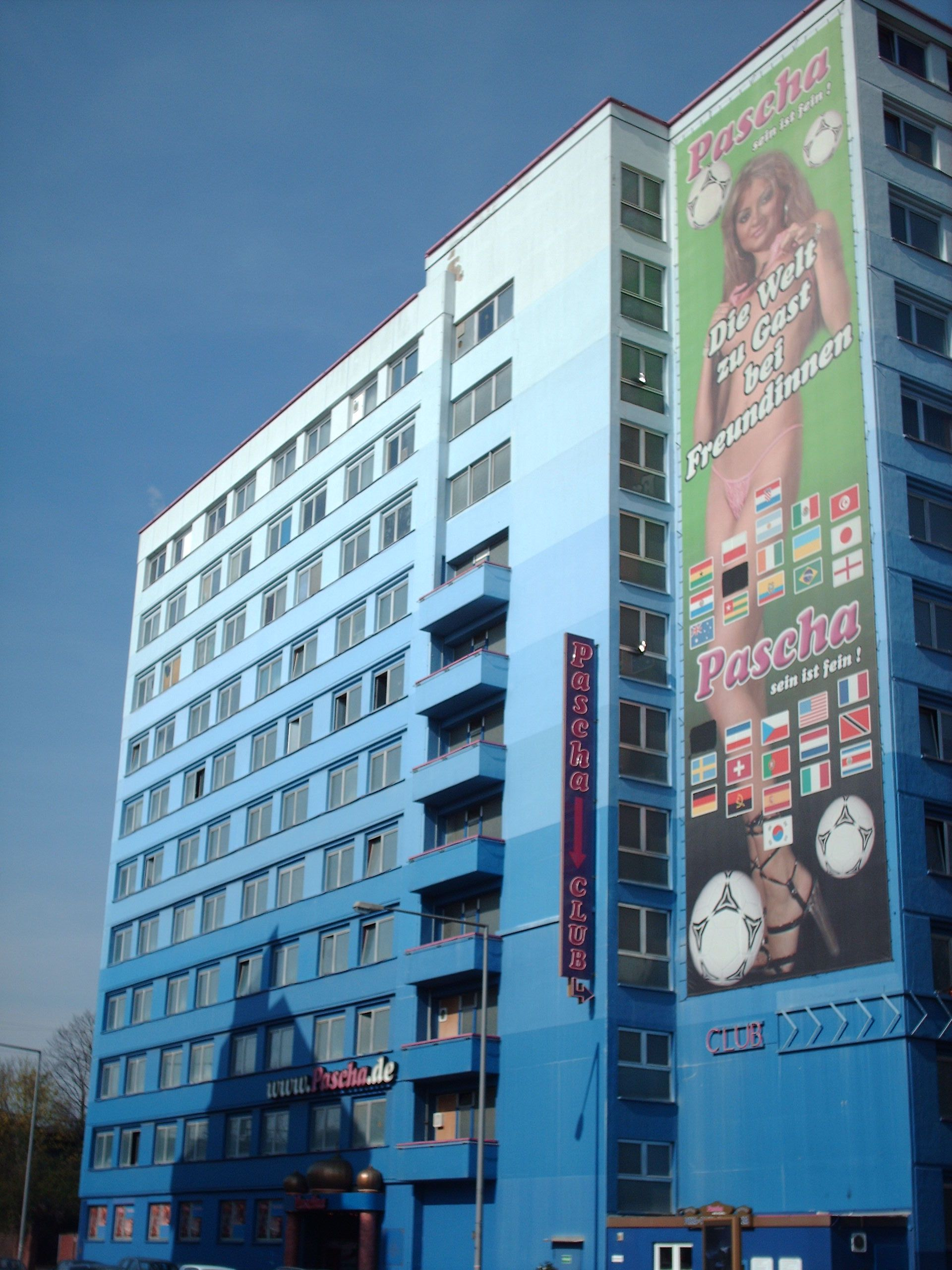
Pascha brothel in Cologne, Germany, is the largest brothel in Europe. During the 2006 FIFA World Cup, the poster with the Saudi Arabian flag and Iranian flag was blacked out after protests and threats.

Officials speculated that up to 40,000 illegal sex workers, mainly from Eastern European countries, would enter Germany for the Football World Cup, held in Germany in the summer of 2006. Women and church groups were planning a "Red card to forced prostitution" campaign with the aim of alerting World Cup visitors to the existence of forced sex trafficking. They asked for support from the national football team and the national football organization but were initially rebuffed. In March 2006, the president of the German football federation turned around and agreed to support a campaign named "Final Whistle – Stop Forced Prostitution". The Parliamentary Assembly of the Council of Europe (PACE), the Nordic Council and Amnesty International also expressed concern over an increase in the trafficking of women and forced sex trafficking up to and during the World Cup.

In March 2006, the campaign "Responsible John. Prostitution without compulsion and violence" was started by the government of Berlin. It provides a list of signs of forced sex trafficking and urges sex workers' customers to call a hotline if they spot one of those signs.

In April 2006, an advertisement for the Pascha brothel in Cologne that featured a several story-high image of a half-naked young woman with the flags of 2006 FIFA World Cup countries sparked outrage after Muslims were offended by the inclusion of the Saudi Arabian and Iranian flags. Pascha's owner, Armin Lobscheid, said a group of Muslims had threatened violence over the advertisement, and he blacked out the two flags. The Tunisian flag that features the Muslim crescent remained on the advertisement.

On 30 June 2006, The New York Times reported that the expected increase in prostitution activity around the World Cup had not taken place. This was confirmed by the 2006 BKA report on human trafficking, which reported only five cases of human trafficking related to the World Cup.

=== COVID-19 pandemic ===
Social distancing as a preventative measure during the initial phase of the COVID-19 pandemic in Germany caused a marked reduction in the number of visitors to brothels, some operators reporting a 50% reduction in business. Several federal states ordered entertainment venues to close on 14 March 2020, followed by the Central Government ordering a nationwide closure on 22 March 2020. (Brothels are classed as entertainment venues in Germany.)

According to Susanne Bleier Wilp of the Association for Erotic and Sexual Services Providers lobby group in Berlin, 80% of the prostitutes working in Germany at the time were foreign, mainly from Bulgaria, Romania, Poland, and Ukraine. Many of them lived in the brothels. Whilst most returned to their home countries, some were made homeless by the brothel closures.

The Berufsverband erotische und sexuelle Dienstleistungen ('Professional association for erotic and sexual services') published a new hygiene concept for sex workers. It had three parts, one for sex workers who work in their own apartments, one for escorts and one for street prostitutes.

==== Thuringia ====
The Thuringian Corona Ordinance decided to keep all the prostitution-related facilities closed until 31 August 2020. The hygiene concepts referred to by brothel operators were all denied. Due to the physical closeness related to such services, it was impossible to counteract the dangers of getting infected effectively.

==== Hamburg ====
On Herbertstraße on St. Pauli, 400 prostitutes and brothel operators protested for the reopening of brothels on 11 July 2020. According to the professional association for erotic and sexual services, the fact that body-related services such as tattoo studios, hairdressers and massage salons were allowed to work during the COVID-19 crisis was unfair.

==== Munich ====
By March 2020, all brothels in Trudering, Munich were closed due to the coronavirus crisis. Prostitutes continued to work outside of regulated establishments. They were allowed to set appointments with clients in the non-restricted areas of the city. As long as brothels were not allowed to open, prostitution continued to take place outside the brothels.

== Extent and demographics ==
Since 2017, the Federal Statistical Office has published annual statistics based on registrations under the Prostitutes Protection Act. At the end of 2025, around 32,500 people held a valid registration to work in prostitution, slightly more than the 32,300 registered in 2024 but still below the 40,400 recorded in 2019, before the COVID-19 pandemic. Around 2,260 prostitution businesses held valid permits. The statistics cover only registrations and permits recorded by the authorities and do not include unregistered sex workers or businesses.

Among those registered at the end of 2025, 18% were German citizens. The most common foreign citizenships were Romanian (35% of all registered sex workers), Bulgarian (11%) and Spanish (9%). The official statistics do not record sex or gender.

The total number of people working in prostitution in Germany is unknown. A statutory evaluation of the Prostitutes Protection Act published in 2025 surveyed more than 2,300 sex workers but found that there was no reliable information about the total population from which they were drawn. It also found that only a proportion of sex workers participate in the registration procedure. A separate federally commissioned study published the same year similarly concluded that there were no robust data or current qualified estimates for the overall number of people working in prostitution, and cautioned against relying on older estimates that have frequently been repeated in public debate.

A population-based survey conducted in Germany in 2018–2019 found that 26.9% of men aged 18–75 reported having paid for sex at least once, while 4.0% reported having done so during the preceding year.

== Forms of female prostitution ==
=== Street prostitution (Straßenstrich) ===
Regular street-based sex work is often quite well organized and controlled by pimps. Most cities established "Sperrbezirke" (off-limits zones) and charge the street based workers an amusement tax, that in the city of Bonn for instance is paid by the sex workers at parking meters, six euro for a period of about eight night hours. The same fee is collected from sex workers in apartments and brothels, sometimes by municipal tax collectors in person. Some sex workers have a nearby caravan, others use the customer's car, still, others use hotel rooms. With recent economic problems, in some large cities "wild" street-based sex work has started to appear: areas where women work temporarily out of short-term financial need. A "sex drive-in", or "Verrichtungsbox", is a facility of structures to enclose cars to provide a safer place for sex work using cars.

=== Prostitution for the procurement of narcotics ===
In every major German city, there are prostitutes who offer their services to procure drugs. This often takes place near the main railway stations, while the act usually takes place in the customer's car or in a nearby rented room. These prostitutes are the most desperate, often underage, and their services are generally the cheapest. Pimps and brothel owners try to avoid drug-addicted prostitutes, as they are inclined to spend their earnings solely or primarily on drugs. Other prostitutes tend to look down on them as well, because they are considered as lowering the market prices.

In a unique effort to move drug-addicted streetwalkers out of the city center and reduce violence against these women, the city of Cologne in 2001 created a special area for tolerated street prostitution in Geestemünder Straße. Dealers and pimps are not tolerated, the parking places have alarm buttons and the women are provided with a cafeteria, showers, clean needles and counselling. The project, modelled on the Dutch tippelzones, is supervised by an organisation of Catholic women. A positive scientific evaluation was published in 2004.

=== Bars ===
In bars, women try to induce men to buy expensive drinks along with sexual services. Sex usually takes place in a separate but attached building. Prices are mostly set by the bar owner and the money is shared between the owner and the prostitute. The prevalence of such practices has diminished as a result of the registration obligation in the Prostitutes Protection Act.

=== Eros centers (Bordell, Laufhaus) ===
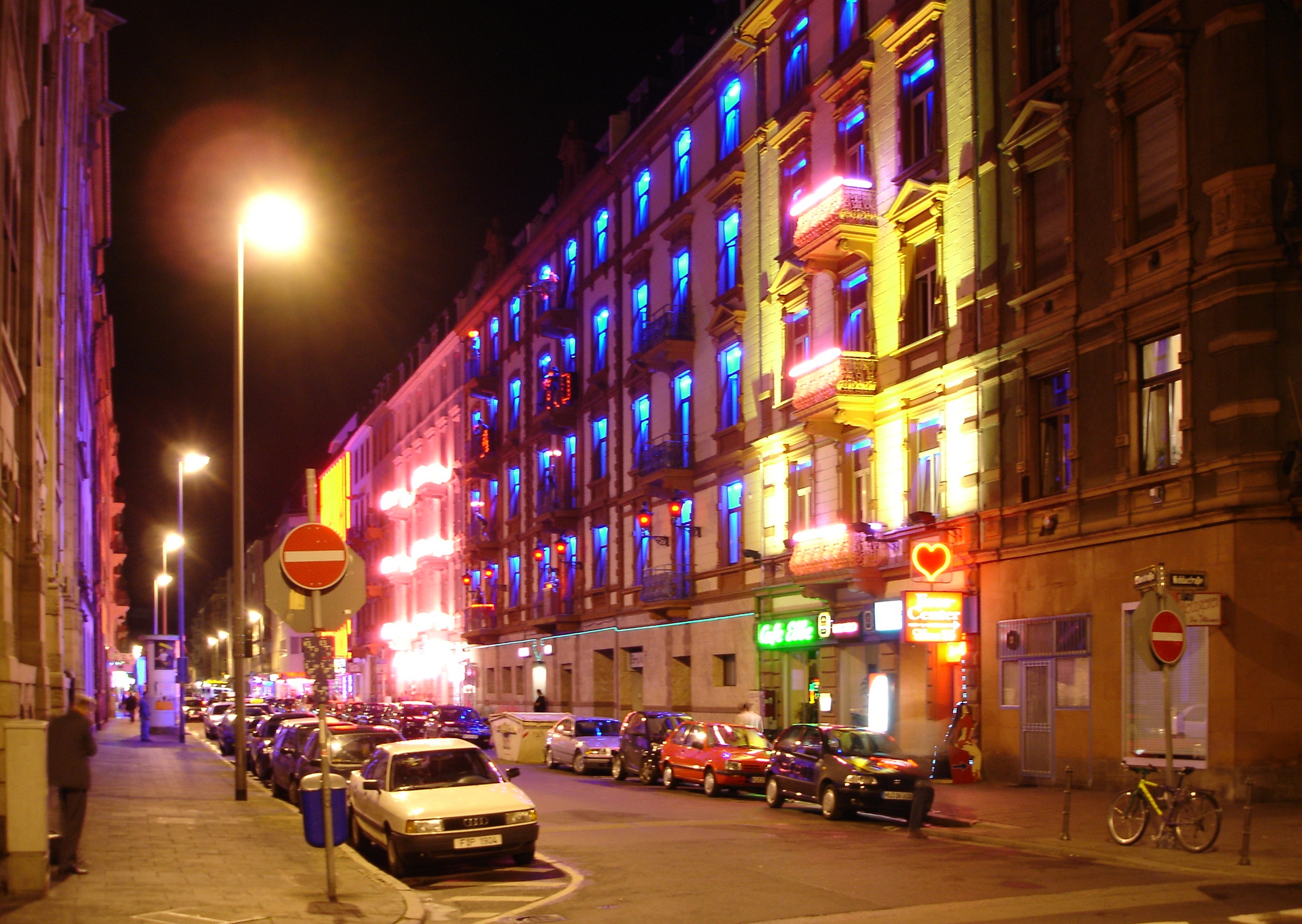
Red light district in Frankfurt am Main, with several eros centers

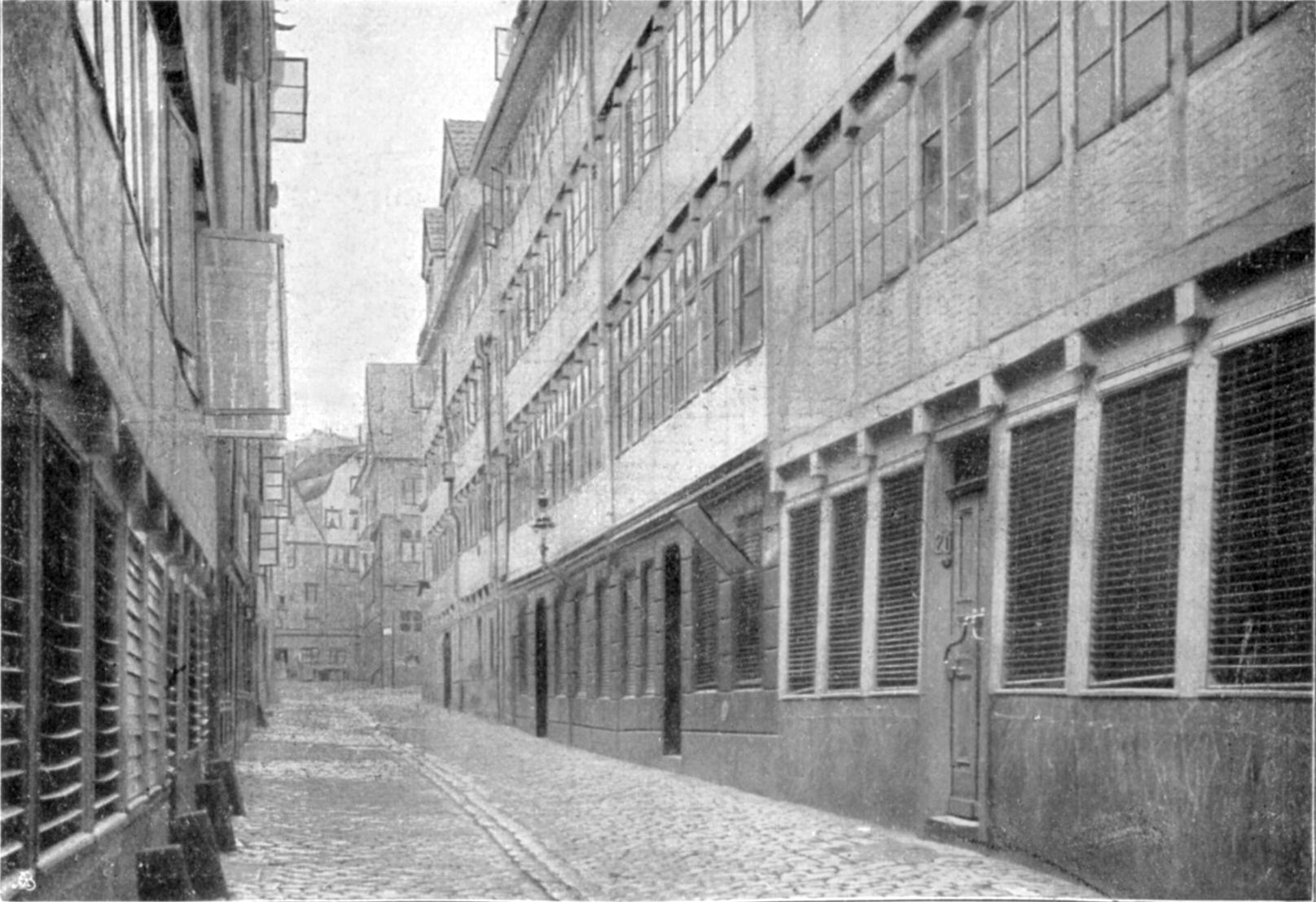
Herbertstraße, Hamburg 1890

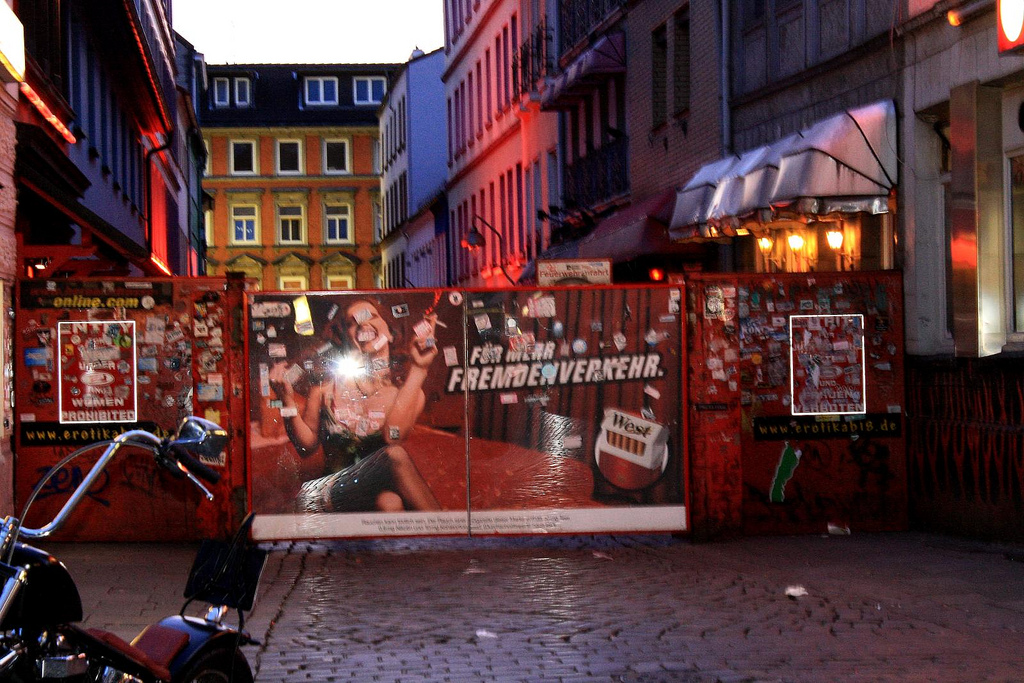
Herbertstraße, Hamburg 2009

An eros center is a house (Laufhaus) or street (Laufstraße) where women can rent small one-room apartments for 80–150 euro per day. Then they solicit customers from the open door or from behind a window. Prices are normally set by the prostitutes; they start at 25 - 75 euros for short-time sex. The money is not shared with the brothel owner. Security and meals are provided by the owner. The women may even live in their rooms, but most do not. Minors and women not working in the eros center are not allowed to enter. Eros centers exist in almost all larger German cities. The most famous is the Herbertstraße near the Reeperbahn in Hamburg. The largest brothel in Europe is the eros center Pascha in Cologne, a 12-storey building with some 120 rooms for rent and several bars.

=== Apartment prostitution (Wohnungspuffs) ===
There are many of these advertised in the daily newspapers. Sometimes run by a single woman or man and sometimes by a group of roommates.

=== Partytreffs and Pauschalclubs ===
These are a variation on partner-swapping swing clubs with (sometimes, but not always) paid prostitutes in attendance, as well as 'amateur' women and couples. Single men pay a flat-rate entrance charge of about €80 to €150, which includes food, drink and unrestricted sexual activity, with the requirement that these are performed in the open in full view of all the guests. Women normally pay a low or zero entrance charge.

=== FKK sauna clubs ===
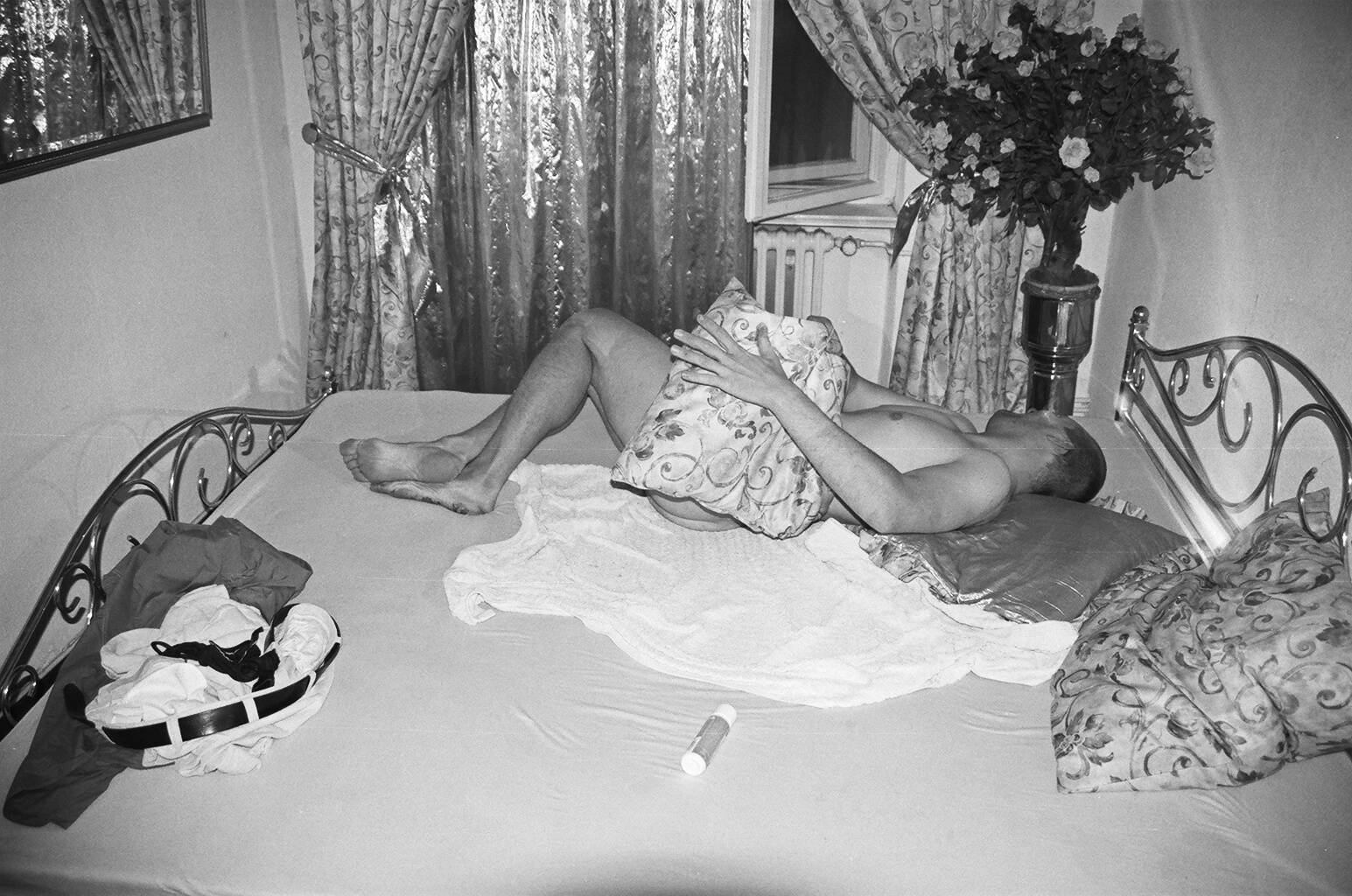
A prostitute's customer in a Berlin brothel, 2001

Typically, these are brothels in houses or large buildings, often with swimming pool and sauna, a large 'meet and greet' room with bar and buffet on the ground floor, TV/video screens, and bedrooms on the upper floor(s). Operating hours are usually from late morning until after midnight. The female sex workers are typically nude, wearing only high heels. The term FKK is a euphemism, erroneously referring to the German FKK 'Freikörperkultur' nudist culture. In some clubs the sex workers are topless instead of nude. Meanwhile the customers and club members wear robes or towels. Men and women often pay the same entrance fee, from €35 to €70, including use of all facilities and refreshments (beer is allowed, but most FKK sauna clubs do not allow liquor). Some clubs will admit couples. This form of prostitution, which was mentioned in the rationale of the 2002 prostitution law as providing good working conditions for the women workers, exists all over Germany, Austria and parts of the Netherlands, but mainly in the Rhein-Ruhrgebiet and in the area around Frankfurt am Main. Among the largest clubs of this type are: Artemis in Berlin, opened in the fall of 2005, the new Harem in Bad Lippspringe and the long-established FKK World near Giessen and FKK Oase in the countryside near Bad Homburg.

=== Escort services (Begleitagenturen) ===
Escort services, where a potential male client calls for a woman to visit a residence or at a hotel for sexual services, exist in Germany.

=== For special groups ===
Sexual services for the disabled and elderly: The agency Sensis in Wiesbaden connects prostitutes with disabled customers. Nina de Vries somewhat controversially provides sexual services to severely mentally disabled men and has been repeatedly covered in the media. Professional training is available for 'sex assistants'.

== Forms of male prostitution ==
A comparatively small number of males offer sexual services to females, usually in the form of escort services, meeting in hotels. The vast majority of male prostitutes serve male clients. In 2007 it was estimated that there were 2,500 male prostitutes in Berlin. The above-mentioned Pascha brothel in Cologne reserves one entire floor for male and transgender prostitutes.

== Legal situation ==
Prostitution is legal in Germany. However, since 2017, prostitutes are required to obtain two-year valid registration certificates after undergoing prescribed health advice, while businesses involved in prostitution must possess legal permits. Both prostitution without the use of condoms and the advertisement of prostitution involving either no condoms or pregnant women, are illegal as well. Prostitutes may work as regular employees with contract and are also supposed to register with the local authority which provides them a certificate of registration, colloquially called Hurenpass, though the vast majority work independently. Brothels are registered businesses that need a special brothel licence; if food and alcoholic drinks are offered, the standard restaurant licence is also required.

Prostitutes have to pay income taxes and have to charge VAT for their services, to be paid to the tax office. In practice, prostitution is a cash business and taxes are not always paid, though enforcement has been strengthened. The Länder North Rhine-Westphalia, Baden Württemberg and Berlin have initiated a system where prostitutes have to pay their taxes in advance, a set amount per day, to be collected and paid to tax authorities by the brothel owners. North Rhine-Westphalia charges €25 per day per prostitute, while Berlin charges €30. In May 2007, authorities were considering plans for a uniform country-wide system charging €25 per day.

Until 2002, prostitutes and brothels were technically not allowed to advertise, but that prohibition was not enforced. The Bundesgerichtshof ruled in July 2006 that, as a consequence of the new prostitution law, advertising of sexual services is no longer illegal. Many newspapers carry daily ads for brothels and for women working out of apartments. Many prostitutes and brothels have websites on the Internet. In addition, sex shops and newsstands sell magazines specialising in advertisements of prostitutes ("Happy Weekend", "St Pauli Nachrichten", "Sexy" and many more).

Foreign women from European Union countries are allowed to work as prostitutes in Germany. Women from other countries can obtain three-month tourist visas for Germany. If they work in prostitution, it is illegal, because the tourist visa does not include a work permit.

Pimping, (Zuhälterei = exploiting and/or controlling a sex worker), admitting prostitutes under the age of eighteen to a brothel, and influencing persons under the age of twenty-one to take up or continue work in prostitution, are illegal. It is also illegal to contract sex services from any person younger than 18, per Article 182 (paragraph 2) of the Criminal Code. Before 2008 this age limit was 16. This law also applies to Germans traveling abroad, to combat child prostitution occurring in the context of sex tourism.

=== Municipal regulation ===
The first city in Germany to introduce an explicit prostitution tax was Cologne. The tax was initiated early in 2004 by the city council led by a coalition of the conservative CDU and the leftist Greens. This tax applies to striptease, peep shows, porn cinemas, sex fairs, massage parlors, and prostitution. In the case of prostitution, the tax amounts to €150 per month and working prostitute, to be paid by brothel owners or by privately working prostitutes. (The area Geestemünder Straße mentioned above is exempt.) Containment of prostitution was one explicitly stated goal of the tax. In 2006 the city took in €828,000 through this tax. The neighboring city of Bonn collects a nightly sex work tax of six euro from street prostitutes in the Immenburgstrasse by vending machines identical to German parking meters. All other areas of the city are Sperrbezirk (off-limits for street prostitution).

Every city has the right to zone off certain areas where prostitution is not allowed (Sperrbezirk). Prostitutes found working in these areas can be fined or, when persistent, jailed. The various cities handle this very differently. In Berlin prostitution is allowed everywhere, and Hamburg allows street prostitution near the Reeperbahn during certain times of the day. Almost the entire center of Munich is Sperrbezirk, and under-cover police have posed as clients to arrest prostitutes. In Leipzig, street prostitution is forbidden almost everywhere, and the city even has a local law allowing police to fine customers who solicit prostitution in public. In most smaller cities, the Sperrbezirk includes the immediate city center as well as residential areas. Several states prohibit brothels in small towns (such as towns with fewer than 35,000 inhabitants).

This concept has been the subject of a number of legal challenges. In North Rhine-Westphalia a Minden court has ruled against 'Sperrbezirk', as have courts in Hesse and Bavaria. The court ruled that a general prohibition of prostitution infringed a basic right to choose one's occupation, as laid down in the 2002 Prostitution Act.

=== Health ===
Annual health checks for prostitutes are mandated by law in Germany. Previously, in Bavaria (Bayern), law mandates the use of condoms for sexual intercourse with prostitutes, including oral contact. In 2017 this was extended to the whole of Germany.

== Crime ==
The 1957 murder of the high-class prostitute Rosemarie Nitribitt in Frankfurt drew great media attention in postwar Germany. The circumstances of her death remain obscure. Police investigations turned up no substantial leads other than a prime suspect who was later acquitted due to reasonable doubt. Several high-profile, respectable citizens turned out to have been among her customers, a fact on which the media based insinuations that higher social circles might be covering up and obstructing the search for the real murderer. The scandal inspired two movies.

Werner Pinzner was a contract murderer active in the brothel scene of Hamburg in the 1980s. Captured in 1986, he confessed to eight murders of people involved in prostitution businesses. His long-time female lawyer and his wife conspired to smuggle a gun into the Hamburg police headquarters on 29 July 1986, and Pinzner proceeded to kill the attending prosecutor, his wife and himself. The lawyer was sentenced to six years in prison for aiding in murder.

Six persons were murdered in a brothel in Frankfurt am Main in 1994. The Hungarian couple managing the place as well as four Russian prostitutes were strangled with electric cables. The case was resolved soon after: it was a robbery gone bad, carried out by the husband of a woman who had worked there.

In 2012 it was reported that police were investigating the owners of a number of high-class brothels in Düsseldorf. Allegedly, numerous customers had been incapacitated with date rape drugs or other drugs in order to charge exorbitant amounts to their credit cards; those who complained were blackmailed with video footage.

=== Organized crime ===
According to Klaus Bayerl, head of the Kriminalpolizei Augsburg, the large brothels created since 2002 are facilities in which official directors are irreproachable persons, while the background, the brothels are run by pimps or criminal gangs and almost always have close ties to organised crime.

Competing for supremacy in the red-light districts include several motorcycle gangs. Again and again there were massive clashes between the Bandidos and the Hells Angels. Both associations are known arms and drug traffickers and promoters of prostitution.

Involved in the fight for control of the red-light districts are the Black Jackets. In 2013, the Lustpark brothel in Neu-Ulm was being used as a weapons warehouse by the Black Jackets. It became known in 2012 that the Dutch gang Satudarah MC were active in Germany. Satudarah is deeply involved in prostitution, drug trafficking and violent crime.

Likewise, the bouncer Gang United Tribuns are involved in the power struggle. The bouncer scene is considered a key position also in recruiting new prostitutes. Other organisations involved in prostitution and trafficking include the Gremium MC, Outlaws MC, the Red Legion, and the Rock Machine MC, whose members are involved in the dispute with the brothel Murat C. in Neu-Ulm in December 2012 when someone was shot.

One of the leading figures in the scene is the German-Turkish Necati Arabaci. He is involved, inter alia, in the brothels Babylon in Elsdorf near Cologne and Wiago in Leverkusen, and also in brothels in Augsburg and Mallorca among others. In 2013 the Augsburg prosecutor established suspicion of money laundering against a person connected to the Hells Angels in the large Colosseum brothel in Augsburg.

The Hanoverian Frank Hanebuth was arrested in July 2013 in Mallorca, Spain, along with 20 other Hells Angels members. As head of the Hells Angels Spanish chapter, he is accused of forming a criminal organisation, promoting illegal prostitution, drug trafficking and money laundering. Hanebuth had acquired several Spanish brothels and is also involved in the mistreatment of prostitutes.

André Schulz, head of the German Criminal Investigation Association warned in July 2016 of "an escalation of turf wars between enemy biker gangs in Germany".

=== Sex trafficking ===
Illegal human trafficking is a major focus of police work in Germany, yet it remains prevalent. In 2007, Germany was listed by the United Nations Office on Drugs and Crime as a top destination for victims of human trafficking.

In 2009, 710 victims of trafficking for the purpose of sexual exploitation were discovered, an increase of 5% in comparison with 2008.

In 2008, authorities identified 676 sex-trafficking victims.

In 2007, law enforcement authorities recorded 689 victims trafficked for sexual exploitation. Most victims (419) were between the ages of 18 and 24; 184 were nationals of the country. Approximately 12 percent were under the age of 18, including 39 citizens. One percent (seven) were under 14 years of age.

The trafficking in women from Eastern Europe is often organized by perpetrators from that same region. The German Federal Police Office BKA reported in 2006 a total of 357 completed investigations of human trafficking, with 775 victims. Thirty-five percent of the suspects were Germans born in Germany and 8% were German citizens born outside of Germany.

According to the report, in 2006 about 35% of the victims of human trafficking reported that they had agreed from the beginning to work in prostitution; often they did not know about the working conditions and debts incurred. Some others hoped for a job as waitress, maid or au pair; some were simply abducted. Once in Germany, their passports are sometimes taken away and they are informed that they now have to work off the cost of the trip. Sometimes they are brokered to pimps or brothel operators, who then make them work off the purchase price. They work in brothels, bars, apartments; as streetwalkers or as escorts and have to hand over the better part of their earnings. Some women reconcile themselves with this situation as they still make much more money than they could at home; others rebel and are threatened or abused. They are, reportedly, sometimes told that the police have been paid off and will not help them, which is false. They are, reportedly, also threatened with harm to their families at home.

The report states that victims are often unwilling to testify against their oppressors: the only incentive they have to do so is the permission to remain in the country until the end of the trial (with the hope of finding a husband during that time), rather than being deported immediately. Prostitutes from EU countries are not prohibited from traveling to and working in Germany. There is a large influx from Poland, Czech Republic, Bulgaria, and Romania, for instance. Actually, the income prospects for them are not larger than at home, but they prefer to work in the better and safer German environment, as long as they can avoid pimps exploiting and controlling them. German law enforcement aggressively tries to eradicate pimping. In one raid in 2013 near Bonn, 24 males were arrested for exploiting prostitutes, one of them just 15 years old.

== Scandals and news coverage ==
In 2003, German CDU politician Michel Friedman, popular TV talk show host and then assistant chairman of the Central Council of Jews in Germany, became embroiled in an investigation of trafficking women. He had been a client of several escort prostitutes from Eastern Europe who testified that he had repeatedly taken and offered cocaine. After receiving a fine for the drug charge, he resigned from all posts. Since 2004 he has been hosting a weekly talk show on the TV channel N24.

Also in 2003, artist and art professor Jörg Immendorff was caught in the luxury suite of a Düsseldorf hotel with seven prostitutes (and four more on their way) and some cocaine. He admitted to having staged several such orgies and received 11 months on probation and a fine for the drug charges. He attempted to explain his actions by his "orientalism" and terminal illness.

In 2012, Bettina Wulff, the ex-wife of German ex-president Christian Wulff, won several court settlements with some media outlets and the search engine Google requiring them to not connect her with an alleged past as a prostitute.

== Politics ==
The coalition of Social Democrats and the Green Party that governed the country from 1998 until late 2005 attempted to improve the legal situation of prostitutes in the years 2000–2003. These efforts were criticized as inadequate by prostitutes' organizations such as Hydra, which lobby for full normality of the occupation and the elimination of all mention of prostitution from the legal code. The conservative parties in the Bundestag, while supporting the goal of improving prostitutes' access to the social security and health care system, have opposed the new law because they want to retain the "offending good morals" status.

German churches run several support groups for prostitutes. These generally favor attempts to remove stigmatization and improve the legal situation of prostitutes, but they retain the long term abolitionist goal of a world without prostitution and encourage all prostitutes to leave the occupation.

Alice Schwarzer rejects all prostitution as inherently oppressive and abusive; she favors a legal arrangement similar to the situation in Sweden, wherein 1999 after heavy feminist lobbying a coalition of Social Democrats, Greens and leftists outlawed the buying but not the selling of sexual services.

In 2005, the ruling grand coalition of CDU and SPD announced plans to punish customers of forced prostitutes, if the customer could reasonably have been aware of the situation. In April 2009, it was reported that the plans would provide for a penalty of up to 5 years in prison. The law had not been enacted when the center-right CDU-FDP coalition came to power in November 2009. In 2014, the coalition of CDU and SPD renewed their plans to increase regulation and control of prostitution. Several organisations protested against these plans, amongst them prostitutes organisations as Hydra, Doña Carmen, the 'Berufsverband erotische und sexuelle Dienstleistungen', and an anonymous group of customers, the Freieroffensive. In 2016 and 2017 many of the proposals were brought into law.

== See also ==
- History of Germany
- Regulated prostitution

== Bibliography ==
- Page, Jamie (2013). Prostitution and subjectivity in late mediaeval Germany and Switzerland (Ph.D). University of St Andrews – via British Library EThOS.
- Richard J. Evans. Prostitution, State and Society in Imperial Germany. Past & Present No. 70 (Feb., 1976), pp. 106-129
- Victoria Harris: Selling Sex in the Reich: Prostitutes in German Society, 1914-1945, Oxford 2010 (reviewed in: THE, 24 June 2010 ).
- Julia Roos: Weimar through the Lens of Gender. Prostitution Reform, Woman’s Emancipation, and German Democracy, 1919–33, Ann Arbor 2010 (reviewed by Katie Sutton in: H-Net Reviews, August 2011 ).
- Anna Bretzlaff. An Examination of Changing Patterns of Prostitution in Germany Since Unification. Carleton University, April 2008
- Conceptions of Prostitute Women‘s Agency in West-Germany from the 1950s to the 1980s. 9th European Social Science History Conference Glasgow, Scotland, UK Wednesday 11 - Saturday 14 April 2012
- Barbara Kavemann. The Act Regulating the Legal Situation of Prostitutes – implementation, impact, current developments. Sozialwissenschaftliches FrauenForschungsInstitut an der Evangelischen Fachhochschule Freiburg. Berlin Sept 2007
- Michaela Freund-Widder: Frauen unter Kontrolle: Prostitution und ihre staatliche Bekämpfung in Hamburg vom Ende des Kaiserreiches bis zu den Anfängen der Bundesrepublik, Münster 2007.
- Sabine Gleß: Die Reglementierung von Prostitution in Deutschland, Berlin 1999.
- Fritz Koch: Verwaltete Lust: Stadtverwaltung und Prostitution in Frankfurt am Main 1866-1968. Wiesbaden 2010.
- Malte König: Der Staat als Zuhälter. Die Abschaffung der reglementierten Prostitution in Deutschland, Frankreich und Italien im 20. Jahrhundert (Bibliothek des Deutschen Historischen Instituts in Rom, Band 131). De Gruyter, Berlin 2016 (reviewed by Julia Brüggemann in: H-France Review, July 2017 ).
- Sybille Krafft: Zucht und Unzucht. Prostitution und Sittenpolizei im München der Jahrhundertwende, Munich 1996.
- Julia Roos: Weimar through the Lens of Gender. Prostitution Reform, Woman’s Emancipation, and German Democracy, 1919-33, Ann Arbor 2010.
- Regina Schulte: Sperrbezirke: Tugendhaftigkeit und Prostitution in der bürgerlichen Welt. 2nd ed. Europ. Verlag-Anst., Frankfurt a.M. 1994.
- Beate Schuster: Die freien Frauen. Dirnen und Frauenhäuser im 15. und 16. Jahrhundert, Frankfurt a.M./New York 1995.
- Peter Schuster: Das Frauenhaus. Städtische Bordelle in Deutschland (1350-1600), Paderborn 1992.
- Stefan Wünsch: Das erkrankte Geschlecht. Medizin und Prostitution im Berlin des 19. und frühen 20. Jahrhunderts, Würzburg 2020. ISBN 978-3-8260-6973-4.
- Claudia Thoben: Prostitution in Nürnberg: Wahrnehmung und Maßregeln zwischen 1871 und 1945, Nürnberg 2007.
- Alltag im Spätmittelalter, Harry Kühnel, Helmut Hundsbichler (eds.), 2nd edn., Kaleidoskop, 1984
