= Flaßhofstraße =

Street in Oberhausen, Germany

Street in Oberhausen, Germany
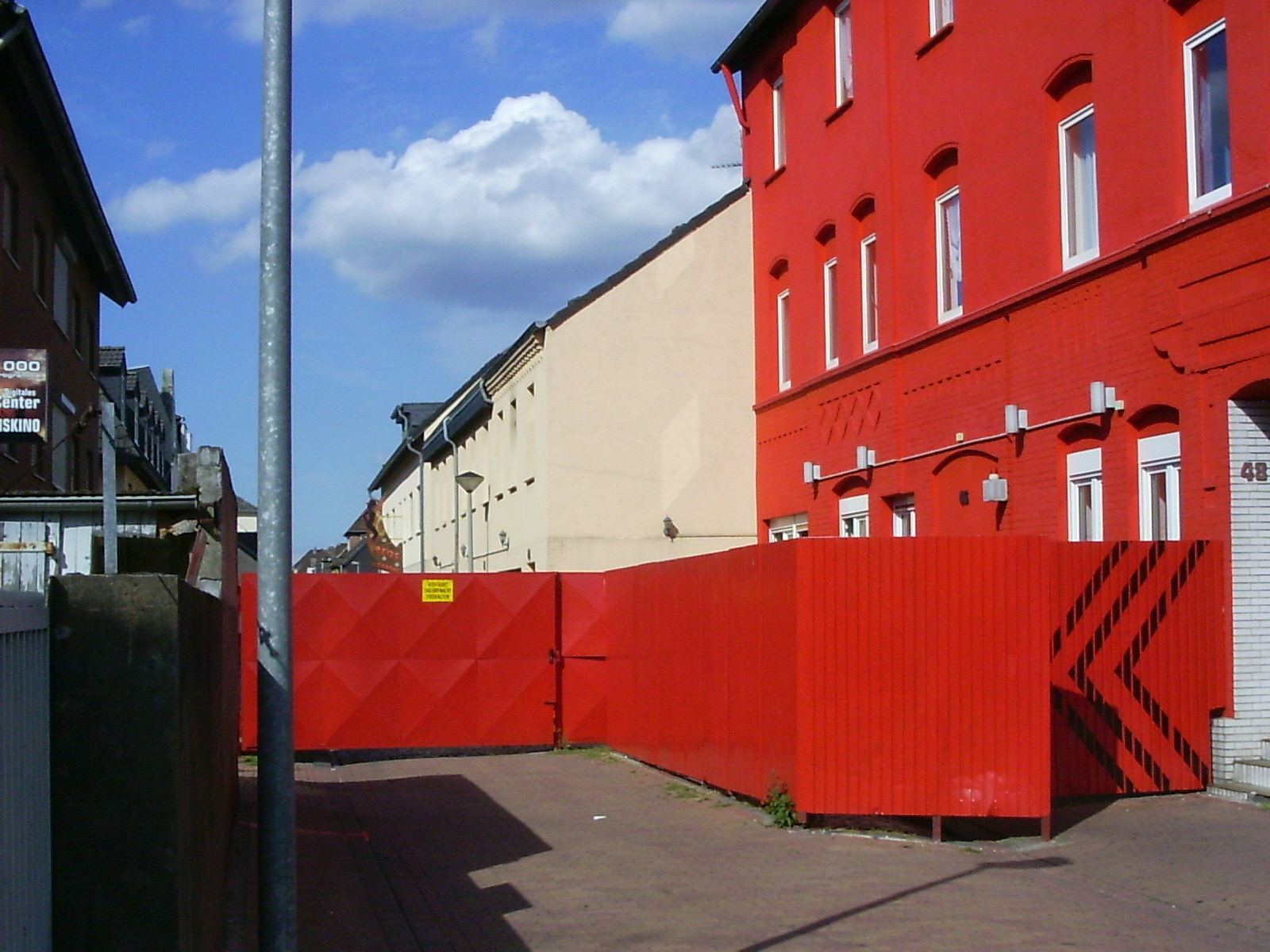
- Entrance to Flaßhofstraße
- Interactive map of Flaßhofstraße
- Former name: Eintrachtstrasse
- Namesake: Christian Flaßhof
- Location: Oberhausen, North Rhine-Westphalia, Germany
- Coordinates: 51.4669252°N 6.8475659°E
- From: Hermann-Albertz-Straße
- To: Grenzstraße

Other
- Known for: Prostitution

The Flaßhofstraße (German pronunciation: [ˈflashoːfˌʃtʁaːsə], lit. 'Flaßhof Street') is street in the city of Oberhausen in the Ruhr district of Germany. It is the centre of the city's red-light district.

== History ==
The brothel street in the central district of Oberhausen has existed in its present form since 1963. It is relatively large in relation to the population of Oberhausen and is a controlled regulation zone. Flaßhofstraße has 16 buildings in which prostitutes rent a total of around 230 rooms. A 2011 police report stated most of the women working in the street come from Romania, Bulgaria and Poland.

Flaßhofstrasse was originally called Eintrachtstrasse. Prostitution on the upper part of this street occurred prior to 1914. The street's reputation soon became known beyond the city. When the Ruhr uprising broke out in defiance of the Kapp Putsch in March 1920, the Ruhr Red Army, whose goal was the establishment of a Dictatorship of the proletariat, put into service the so-called "Red Cross sisters" as medical personnel, who consisted exclusively of prostitutes who were recruited "especially from Oberhausen". Some of them, the Karbol-Mäuschen (carbolic mice), took part in the looting of Schloss Sythen on March 21, 1920, which was then in the possession of the Count Otto von Westerholt and Gysenberg (1875-1920). "Red Cross Sisters" of the Red Ruhr Army, who were found with a pistol were shot by the Freikorps Epp, who had been deployed against the Ruhr uprising.

The part of Eintrachtstrasse affected by prostitution was renamed Flaßhofstrasse on April 1, 1921 by a decree from the President of the Government of Düsseldorf, Walther Grützner. Under the threat of expropriation, the residents of the houses in this section had to prove that the houses were rented for residential purposes. On March 31, 1921, an Oberhausen newspaper reported that the ordinance had worked.

Christian Flaßhof was honoured with the new name of the street. He had, with his brother-in-law Jobst Waldthausen and Wilhelm Lueg, drilled exploratory holes on the Lipper Heide and discovered coal in 1845, the Concordia colliery being set-up on the strength of these findings.

When prostitution on Flaßhofstraße was revived in the 1930s, the residents of the rest of Eintrachtstrasse pushed for a renaming. In 1938 this section was renamed Linsingenstrasse.

In the late 1960s a "privacy screen" made from corrugated iron was erected across the end of the street.

== Modern times ==
In its city zone planning, which was carried out from 2001 to 2003, there was a limit applied to the spatial use of brothels. The brothel area of Flaßhofstrasse was measured and a special area with for brothels was defined with “regional importance”.

Following the introduction of the "amusement tax"colloquially known as "sex tax", in 2008, the city of Oberhausen has been levying tax amounts on the operators of the "accommodation establishments" used as brothels in Flaßhofstrasse. In 2011 these were amounts between 50,000 and 300,000 euros. Some of the companies concerned brought an action before the Düsseldorf Administrative Court. The court ruled in 2011 that this tax was a permissible expense tax and dismissed the lawsuits.

The president of the Oberhausen Hells Angels, previously head of an earlier chapter of the Bandidos, was the tenant of eight of the 16 houses on Flaßhofstrasse. In 2013 there was a struggle for supremacy with fights and shootings. In the same year the 50th anniversary of the brothel street was celebrated.

In May 2015 it was announced that the brothel operator Bert Wollersheim, known from television shows, was to beautify Flaßhofstrasse. Daniel Schranz, who was elected mayor of Oberhausen in September 2015, replied to Wollersheim's plans in his election campaign that the term "beautiful" should not be used for a street of prostitution and he would "do everything possible to move the red light area out of the city centre."

== See also ==
- Prostitution in Germany

== Bibliography ==
- Alexander, Rolf B. (1969). Die Prostitution in Deutschland (in German). Lichtenberg.
- Kalfhues, Franz Josef (1996). "Plünderung und Mord auf Haus Sythen. Aus dem Tagebuch des Josef Mallmann 1920 [ Looting and murder on the Sythen house. From the diary of Josef Mallmann 1920]". Vestischer Kalender 1996 (in German). Jahrgang.
- Lucas, Erhard (1973). Märzrevolution 1920. Band 2: Der bewaffnete Arbeiteraufstand im Ruhrgebiet in seiner inneren Struktur und in seinem Verhältnis zu den Klassenkämpfen in den verschiedenen Regionen des Reiches : [bei der vorliegenden Untersuchung handelt es sich um die Fortführung der 1970 im März-Verl. erschienenen Arbeit "Märzrevolution im Ruhrgebiet"] [March Revolution 1920 . Volume 2: The armed workers' uprising in the Ruhr area in its structure and in relation to the class struggles in the different regions of the empire]. Verl. Roter Stern. ISBN 9783878770640.
- Micke, Andrea (18 March 2011). "Wie Prostituierte an der Flaßhofstraße in Oberhausen mit Sex Geld verdienen" [How prostitutes make money on sex on Flaßhofstrasse in Oberhausen]. www.derwesten.de (in German). Archived from the original on 16 January 2021.
- Micke, Andrea (19 March 2011). "Sperrgebiet Flaßhofstraße" [Restricted area Flaßhofstrasse] (PDF). NRZ (in German). Archived from the original (PDF) on 2016-03-04.
- Micke, Andrea (21 May 2015). "Wollersheim soll Oberhausener Rotlichtviertel verschönern" [Wollersheim is said to beautify Oberhausen's red light district]. www.derwesten.de (in German).
- Remer, David (2013). "Die historische Entwicklung der autonomen Antifaschistischen Aktion" [The historical development of the autonomous "anti-fascist action"]. www.trend.infopartisan.net (in German).
- Ruge, Wolfgang (1969). Weimar, Republik auf Zeit (in German). Deutscher Verlag der Wissenschaften.
- Wübbe, Walter (2010). Plünderung auf Haus Sythen 1920 [Looting at House Sythen]. Haltern am See.
