= Stahlstraße =

Street in Essen, Germany

Street in Essen, Germany
- Location within Germany
- Former name: Heilig-Geist-Straße
- Namesake: Krupp Steel Works
- Location: Western District, Essen, North Rhine-Westphalia, Germany
- Coordinates: 51.461447°N 7.002046°E
- From: Nordhofstraße

Other
- Known for: Prostitution

The Stahlstraße (German pronunciation: [ˈʃtaːlˌʃtʁaːsə], lit. 'Steel Street') is a street in the western district of Essen Germany. It is the city's red-light district. Stahlstraße is a dead end has a privacy screen across its entrance. It is located northwest of the city centre, about 200 metres southwest of the University of Duisburg-Essen (built in 1972) and 300 metres northwest of the Limbecker Platz shopping centre (built in 2008/2009).

== History ==
The street has been associated with prostitution since around 1900, at that time under the name Heilig-Geist-Straße. The street was renamed Stahlstraße (Steel Street) in honour of the Essen steel company Krupp It is regarded as one of the oldest red-light districts in Germany.

After the introduction of the Gesetz zur Bekämpfung der Geschlechtskrankheiten (Venereal Disease Control Act) in 1927, Essen police took control of the entrance to Stahlstraße and took down the names of men entering the street. This practice was stopped only after the intervention of Minister of the Interior, Albert Grzesinski.

In 1965, the magazine Der Spiegel reported Stahlstraße had 17 brothels with a total workforce of over 200 prostitutes on occasions. The prostitutes including included those from Italy, the Netherlands and France.

== Modern times ==
In 2013, the 17 brothels in Stahlstraße were reported to employ about 100 to 120 women.

The outlaw motorcycle club Bandidos have influence over the Stahlstraße. According to the Essen police spokesman Ulrich Faßbender, in 2013 the Bandidos had no competition in the street from other bike gangs although in February 2012, some of the Bandidos were injured during a stabbing in the Stahlstraße.

In January 2020 police, supported by customs, immigration, tax and regulatory officers, raided all 17 brothels on the street. One brothel was closed by officers for failing to meet hygiene requirements. Over 80 prostitutes were interviewed investigating sex-trafficking of East European women.

Prostitution in Stahlstraße was temporarily suspended in mid-March 2020 as part of the preventative measures introduced during the coronavirus pandemic.

== See also ==
- Prostitution in Germany
