= Necati Arabaci =

German of Turkish descent motorcyclist and criminal (born 1971)

- Born: 14 February 1972 (age 54); Cologne, West Germany
- Other name: "Neco"
- Occupations: Greengrocer; outlaw biker; crime boss
- Allegiance: Hells Angels
- Convictions: Extortion, pimping in FKK, and human trafficking (2004)
- Penalty: 9 years' imprisonment (2004)

"Neco" (Turkish: Coşkun Necati Arabacı; born 14 February 1972) is a Turkish outlaw biker, gangster and high-ranking member of the Hells Angels Motorcycle Club. He was formerly active in Cologne, Germany and now lives in Dubai. In 2002, he was arrested in Germany for pimping, human trafficking, assault, extortion, weapons violations, and racketeering. He confessed during his trial in 2004 and was sentenced to nine years in prison. He was released in 2007 and deported to Turkey.

== Criminal career ==
=== Activities in Germany ===
The so-called Arabaci-Clan reportedly controlled the bouncer scene of the nightclubs in Cologne's entertainment district, the Kölner Ringe, and his gang of bouncers reportedly befriended girls in order to exploit them as prostitutes. Arabaci also controlled several brothels in the Rhein-Ruhr region of Germany.

While already in prison, he reputedly still controlled the "Colosseum" brothel in Augsburg. In 2008 after his deportation, police still strongly suspected him to control the brothel and several members of Arabaci's clan were sighted in Berlin in 2008, possibly trying to gain a foothold for the gang in the city's red-light scene.

During his detention in Germany, Arabaci reportedly plotted to kill the prosecutor and hired an Albanian contract killer from Duisburg. The police had bugged his visiting room, and the prosecutor was given bodyguards and police protection. Based on the transcripts, Arabaci was prosecuted again to obtain "Sicherungsverwahrung" (indefinite imprisonment of extremely dangerous criminals). At trial, a mistranslation of some of the transcripts was detected, and Arabaci was acquitted. The prosecutor fled Germany in 2007 when Arabaci was deported to Turkey. An insider reported, that Arabaci has signed a cooperation with the Street Gang "United Tribuns".

=== Activities in Turkey ===
In 2010 it was reported that Arabaci took part in a meeting of international Hells Angels bosses in İzmir, Turkey. He had just been appointed president of the "Hells Angels MC Nomads Turkey". In 2013 Arabaci was seen as a possible new leader of the European Hells Angels, after previous leader Frank Hanebuth had been arrested in Spain.

=== Arrest warrant ===
In 2015, Spanish authorities issued a warrant for Arabaci's arrest, valid throughout the European Union. He is accused of membership in a criminal organization, extortion, drug trafficking and involvement in brothels in Spain. Turkey does not extradite Turkish citizens.

== See also ==
- Prostitution in Germany
