= Prostitution Act =

Federal law in Germany regulating the legal status of prostitution

Prostitution Act (Prostitutionsgesetz)

Bundestag
- Long title: Law regulating the legal status of prostitutes (Gesetz zur Regelung der Rechtsverhältnisse der Prostituierten)
- Citation: Text of the Law (In German)
- Territorial extent: Germany
- Enacted: 20 December 2001
- Commenced: 1 January 2002

The Prostitution Act (Prostitutionsgesetz - ProstG) is a federal law in Germany that regulates the legal status of prostitution as a service in order to improve the legal and social situation of prostitutes. The law was promulgated on 20 December 2001 and has been enforced since 1 January 2002. At the same time the Strafgesetzbuch (Criminal Code) §180a (exploitation of prostitutes) and §181a (pimping) were amended to allow for employment of prostitutes, as long as they were not exploited.

The law also allows prostitutes to file health, unemployment, pension, nursing care, and accident insurance.

== Construction and content ==
=== Legal Development ===
Prior to the entry into force of the Prostitution Act, contracts for sexual services were generally regarded as immoral within the meaning of Section 138(1) of the BGB (civil code). The legal consequence of immorality was the nullity of the contract. Therefore, neither a claim of the customer for the provision of the service nor a claim of the prostitutes for the agreed consideration is valid. The result was the practice of prepayment; A refund of the fee was excluded in this case according to §817 sentence 2 BGB.

According to the Administrative court of Berlin, prostitution was no longer immoral even before the Prostitution Act: "[...] the state obligation to protect human dignity (Article 1(1) sentence 2 GG) must not be misused to harm individuals through interference with protecting individual self-determination as it were from itself." The European Court of Justice has made it clear that prostitution is a gainful employment that is "part of the common economic life" within the meaning of Article 2 EC. Rulings on immorality, however, have not been passed in civil law, due to doubts about enforceability, compensation for bad performance, etc.

This civil-law assessment also had an impact on the concept of criminal law and thus, in particular, on fraud, which requires financial loss. If the work of the prostitutes could not justify a claim, it did not belong to the criminally protected assets. Anyone who used sexual services and thus fooled about his willingness to pay, committed no fraud for lack of financial loss. The Federal Court accepts this principle. On the other hand, the prostitute, who accepts money and misleads the customer about their willingness to provide sexual services, commits a fraud, as the customer's "good money" was, in the vast majority of view, despite the immoral purpose of the client's protected assets.

This legal position was judged by the legislature to be in need of reform.

The legislative procedure was initiated in May 2001 and included several expert hearings. In addition to the factions of the government parties SPD and Greens, the opposition factions of the FDP and the PDS voted in favour of the bill introduced by the government on 19 October 2001 in the Bundestag. Only the CDU/CSU faction opposed the law.

=== Regulatory content ===
"If sexual acts have been carried out against a previously agreed charge, this agreement constitutes a legally enforceable claim. The same applies if a person, in particular in the context of an employment relationship, provides for the provision of such acts for a previously agreed fee for a certain period of time."

— §1 ProstG

§1 states that after the provision of sexual services, the provider is entitled to payment of the promised consideration. It clarifies that the customer does not have a claim for the performance of the service, or that the provision of the service is enforceable. As judgements on the establishment of marital union are not enforceable, (§120 paragraph 3 FamFG), enforcement would be inconsistent and possibly unconstitutional as a violation of Art. 1 GG (respect for human dignity).

§2 of the law ensures that the objection of immorality is excluded because of the nature of the service. It should not be required in court to prove the quality of the services provided. However, other circumstances, such as inability to work and probably also immorality because of usury are not excluded.

In addition, the payment claim can not be assigned. Beyond the wording, the claim also can not be asserted by means of the power of attorney or process status, although substitution (acting in a foreign name) remains possible. This makes trading in such claims impossible.

"For prostitutes, the limited right to give instructions in the context of a dependent activity does not preclude the assumption of employment within the meaning of social security law."

— §3 ProstG

In §3 the conditions for admission to social security are created.

The enforceability of fees in practice is of little importance, since payment is almost always made in advance.

The advertising ban for sexual services (Section 119 OWiG) was not repealed by the Prostitution Act. The offence (Section 120 OWiG) and the offence (Section 184d StGB) of prohibited prostitution, i.e. the infringement of a restricted area decree issued on the basis of Article 297 of the CCAIL, also remained unchanged.

== Criticism ==
Since human dignity, as the highest constitutional value (Article 1 of the Basic Law), is not at the discretion of the state, or even by law, prostitution, according to some lawyers, continues to be immoral. In particular, it argues that § 2 ProstG only excludes the objection of immorality and § 1 speaks only of a "legally effective demand", however, does not order positively that the contract is not immoral or even effective. Also, the lack of enforceability of sexual performance shows clearly that it is still not a normal contract. However, the legal relationships are finally regulated by the Prostitution Act.

Although § 180a StGB criminalises the "exploitation of prostitutes", the paragraph is rarely used, as both economic dependence and personal dependence are difficult to prove. A conviction in criminal proceedings is unlikely without the statement of those affected.

The magazine EMMA, which holds a critical view on prostitution in general, claims the Prostitution Act promotes forced prostitution.

The Federal Social Court found, in a judgment of 6 May 2009, that the Prostitution Act was enacted to protect employees and not to promote business. A brothel operator can not demand the placement of prostitutes by the Federal Employment Agency.

== Amendment ==
In the coalition agreement negotiated by the CDU, CSU and SPD after the 2013 general election, a "comprehensive revision" of the Prostitution Act was announced. In this context, the legal basis for the control of prostitution sites by the regulatory authorities should be improved. In the same section of the coalition agreement, albeit without a direct legal link to the Prostitution Act, the governing parties also announced measures against forced prostitution and trafficking. Thus, the victims should be better protected and corresponding offenders punished more consistently. In the future, action should also be taken against people "who knowingly and wilfully exploit the predicament of victims of trafficking and forced prostitution and abuse them for sexual acts".

In September 2016, the Prostitute Protection Act was passed, which introduced a compulsory registration for prostitutes, a compulsory permit for the prostitution industry and other regulations, such as regular, compulsory health advice and use of condoms.

== See also ==
- Prostitution in Germany
