= List of red-light districts =

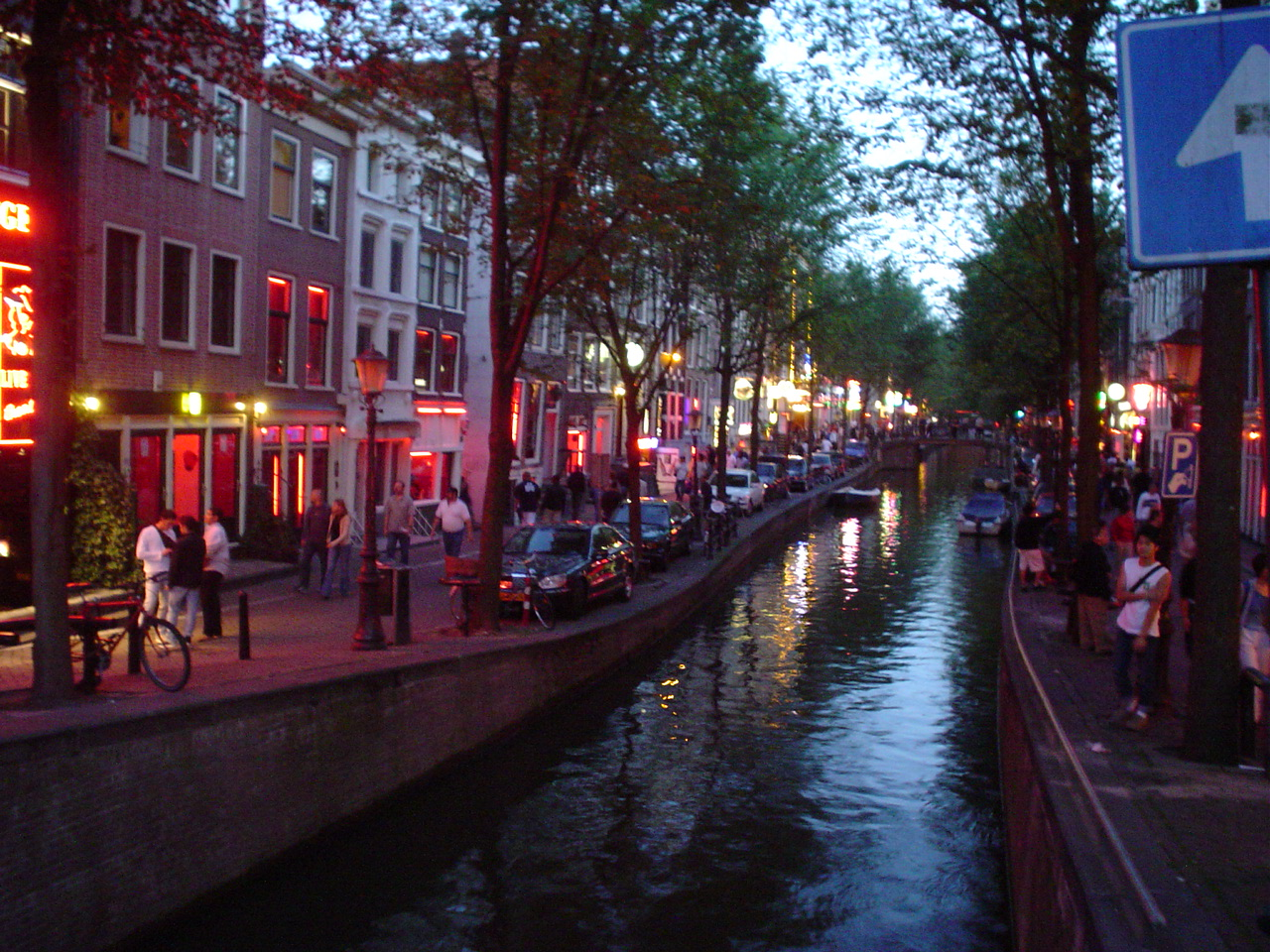
De Wallen red-light district in Amsterdam

Red-light districts are areas associated with the sex industry and sex-oriented businesses (e.g. sex shops and strip clubs). In some of these places prostitution occurs, whether legally or illegally. The enforcement of prostitution laws varies by region.

Following is a partial list of well known red-light districts around the world, both current and historical.

== Africa ==
=== Algeria ===
Prostitution in Algeria is illegal.

- Constantine
  - Rahbat al-Jammal (defunct)

=== Burkina Faso ===
Prostitution is not specifically prohibited by the law, but soliciting and pimping are illegal.

- Ouagadougou
  - Dapoya

=== Egypt ===
Prostitution in Egypt is illegal.

- Alexandria
  - Kom al-Nadura (defunct)
  - Kom Bakir (defunct)
  - Al-Tartushi (defunct)
- Cairo
  - Wagh El Birket (defunct)

=== Ivory Coast ===
Prostitution in Ivory Coast is legal.

- Abidjan
  - Marcory Zone 4
  - Rue Princesse

=== Kenya ===
Prostitution is illegal.

- Nairobi
  - Koinange Street

=== Mauritania ===
Prostitution in Mauritania is illegal.

- Nouakchott
  - El Mina

=== Morocco ===
Prostitution is illegal.

- Casablanca
  - Bousbir(defunct)
- Fez
  - Moullay Abdullah (defunct)
- Marrakesh
  - Bab el Khemis
- Rabat
  - Oukassa (defunct)
- Tangier
  - Petit Socco

=== South Africa ===
Prostitution is illegal.

- Durban
  - Point Road
- Johannesburg
  - Hillbrow

=== Tunisia ===
Prostitution is regulated.

- Tunis
  - Sidi Abdallah Guech

== Asia ==
=== Bangladesh ===
Prostitution in Bangladesh is legal and regulated.

- Bagerhat District
  - Bani Shanta
- Faridpur District
  - Faridpur
- Narayanganj
  - Tanbazar
- Rajbari District
  - Daulatdia
- Tangail District
  - Kandapara

=== Cambodia ===
Prostitution is illegal, but tolerated.

- Phnom Penh
  - Svay Pak

=== China ===
Prostitution is illegal.

- Beijing
  - Dashilan
- Shanghai
  - Simalu

=== Hong Kong ===
Prostitution itself is not illegal but operating a brothel is illegal.

- Lockhart Road
- Sham Shui Po/Fuk Wa Street

=== India ===
Prostitution is legal when performed by a person acting alone in private but public solicitation, brothels and pimping are illegal (however in practice prostitution is tolerated and regulated).

- Prayagraj
  - Meergunj
- Bundi
  - Mohanpura
- Gwalior
  - Rashmpura
- Hyderabad
  - Mehboob Ki Mehandi
- Jaipur
  - Tilawala
- Jodhpur
  - Jawaharkhana Ghaas Mandi
- Kolkata
  - Bowbazar
  - Garia
  - Kalighat
  - Kidderpore
  - Kada Road, Durgapur
  - Lebu Bagan
  - Sonagachi
  - Tollygunge
- Meerut
  - Kabadi Bazar
- Mumbai
  - Kamathipura
- Muzaffarpur
  - Chaturbhuj Sthan
- Nagpur
  - Ganga Jamuna, SMS King, Itwari
- New Delhi
  - Garstin Bastion Road
- Pune
  - Budhwar Peth
- Sitamarhi
  - Boha Tola – (burnt down in 2008)
- Surat
  - Chakla Bazar
- Varanasi
  - Dalamandi, near the Kashi Vishwanath Temple – (closed 1970s)
  - Shivdaspur

=== Indonesia ===
Prostitution is illegal in non-regulated areas. Prostitution is legal in some locations (including pimping and maintaining a brothel).

- Batam
  - Nagoya
- Jakarta
  - Kalijodo (demolished on 29 February 2016, now a public park)
  - Kramat Tunggak (closed in 1999)
- Deli Serdang
  - Bandar Baru
- Surabaya
  - Gang Dolly (closed in 2014)

=== Iran ===
Prostitution in Iran is illegal, and incurs various punishments ranging from fines and jail terms to execution for repeat offenders.

- Tehran
  - Shahr-e No (demolished 1980)

=== Iraq ===
Prostitution in Iraq is illegal, and penalties are severe.

- Baghdad
  - Al-Battaween
  - Bataween
  - Haifa Street/Salhia neighborhood
  - Kamaliyah (Arabic: الكمالية)
  - Zayouna

=== Israel ===
- Tel Aviv
  - Old bus station area.

=== Japan ===
Prostitution is illegal but narrowly defined. Many sexual acts for pay that would be considered to be prostitution in other countries are legal.

- Fukuoka
  - Nakasu
- Gifu
  - Kanazuen
- Hokkaidō
  - Susukino
- Kyoto
  - Shimabara (defunct)
- Osaka
  - Imasato Shinchi
  - Jūsō
  - Kujo
  - Matsushima Shinchi
  - Shinchi Otobe (defunct)
  - Shinmachi
  - Shinodayama Shinchi
  - Tobita Shinchi
  - Yoshiwara (defunct)
- Tokyo
  - Kabukichō
  - Roppongi
  - Yoshiwara (defunct)

=== Jordan ===
Prostitution is illegal.

- Amman
  - Jubeiha
  - Sweifieh

=== Kyrgyzstan ===
Prostitution is legal but pimping and operating a brothel are illegal.

- Bishkek
  - Pravda Street

=== Malaysia ===
Prostitution in most of Malaysia is legal and widespread, though there are laws against prostitution-related activities. However, prostitution is illegal in Malaysia's Kelantan state.

- Kuala Lumpur
  - Brickfields area: Jalan Hicks and Jalan Thamibipilly
  - Bukit Bintang: Jalan Alor and Changkat Bukit Bintang
  - Chow Kit
  - Jalan Petaling
  - Lorong Haji Taib
- Johor Bahru
  - Johor Bahru City Square
  - Wong Ah Fook Street
  - Jalan Meldrum
  - Kotaraya
  - Taman Sentosa

=== South Korea ===
Prostitution is illegal, but in practice it is tolerated and regulated.

- Daegu
  - Jagalmadang
- Paju
  - Yong Ju Gol
- Seoul
  - Cheonho
  - Cheongnyangni 588 (demolished 2017)
  - Hooker Hill, Itaewon
  - Mia-ri
  - Yeongdeungpo

=== Pakistan ===
Prostitution is illegal, but in practice it is somewhat tolerated although not regulated.

- Hyderabad
  - Bazaar-i-Husn
  - Serey Ghat
- Karachi
  - Napier Road
- Lahore
  - Heera Mandi
- Multan
  - Bazaar-i-Husn
- Peshawar
  - Thatti Bazaar

=== Philippines ===
Prostitution is illegal, but widespread and generally tolerated.

- Angeles City
  - Fields Avenue
- Manila
  - EDSA Entertainment Complex, Pasay
  - Ermita
  - Malate
  - Padre Burgos Street, Makati
  - Poblacion, Makati
- Olongapo City
  - Subic Bay

=== Singapore ===
Prostitution itself is not illegal; however, public solicitation, living on the earnings of prostitution, and maintaining a brothel are illegal.

- Geylang
- Orchard Towers

=== Taiwan ===
Prostitution in Taiwan was made illegal under a 1991 law. Legislation was introduced in 2011 to allow local governments in Taiwan to set up "special zones" where prostitution is permitted. Outside these zones prostitution is illegal. As of 2017 no "special zones" had been opened.

- Taipei
  - Snake Alley (defunct)

=== Thailand ===
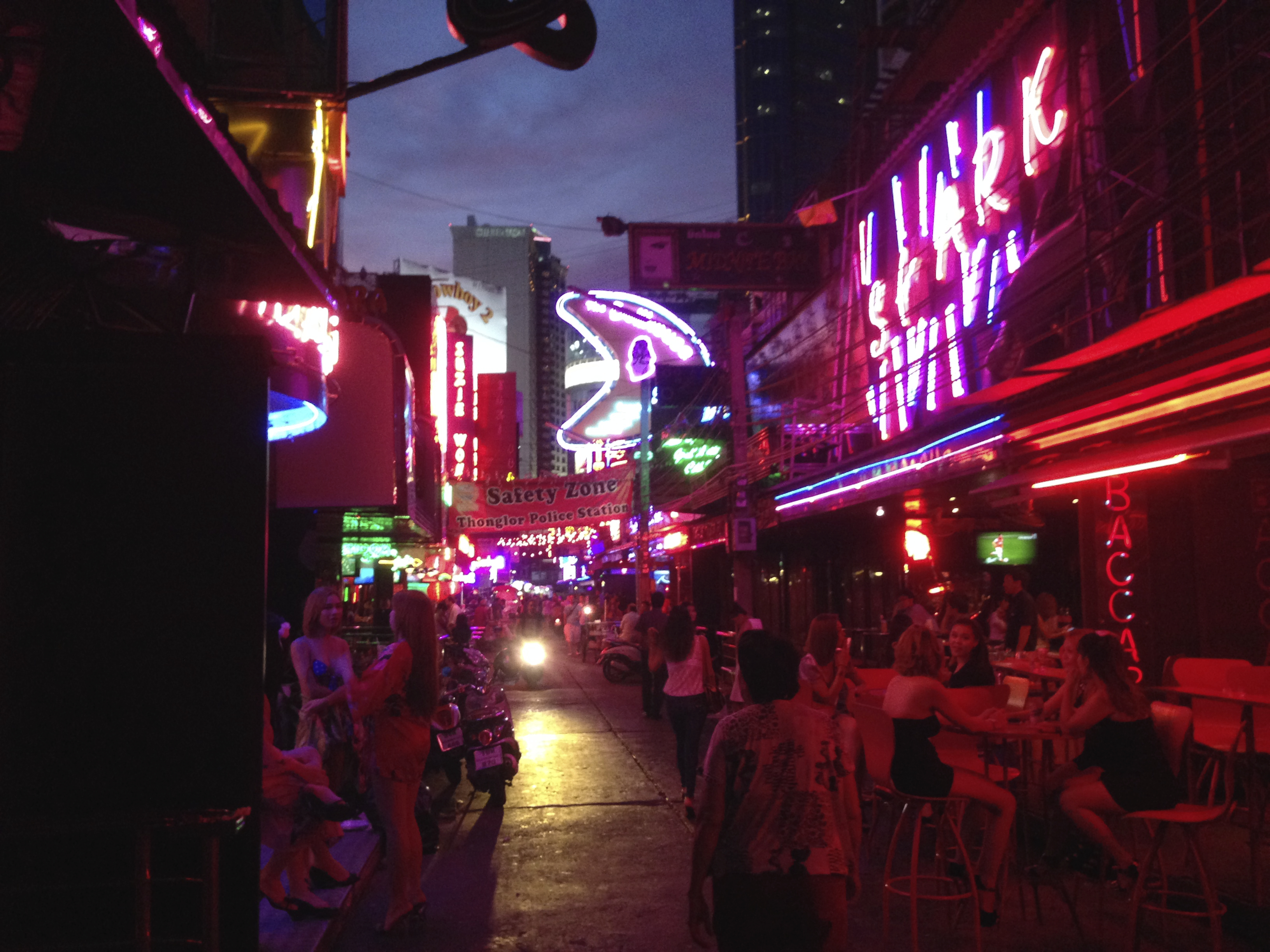
Soi Cowboy, Thailand

Prostitution is illegal in Thailand, and solicitation and public nuisance laws are in effect. In practice it is tolerated and partly regulated.

- Bangkok
  - Patpong
  - Soi Pratuchai
  - The western Sukhumvit Road area (notably including Nana Plaza and Soi Cowboy; formerly included the now-defunct Clinton Plaza)
  - Washington Square (demolished 2013)
- Phuket
  - Soi Bang-La – Patong Beach
- Pattaya
  - Beach Road
  - Boyztown
  - Soi 6
  - Sunee Plaza
  - Walking Street

=== Turkey ===
Prostitution is legal and regulated.

- Ankara
  - Bentderesi
- Istanbul
  - Züraga Sokaği (Giraffe Lane), Beyoğlu

== Europe ==
=== Austria ===
Prostitution is legal and regulated.

- Linz
  - Bäckermühlweg
- Vienna
  - Gürtel
  - Stuwerviertel

=== Belgium ===
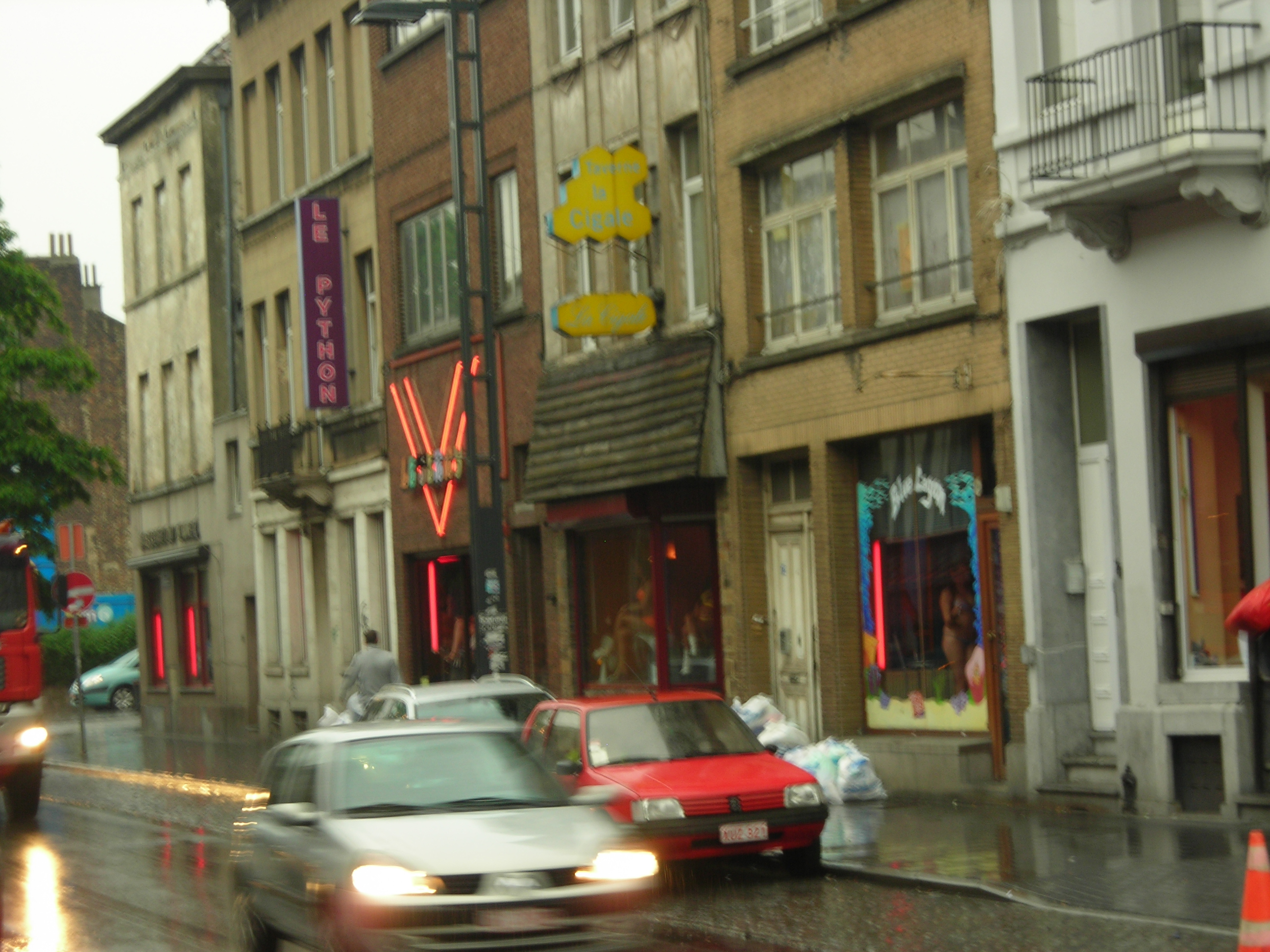
Rue d'Aerschot, Brussels

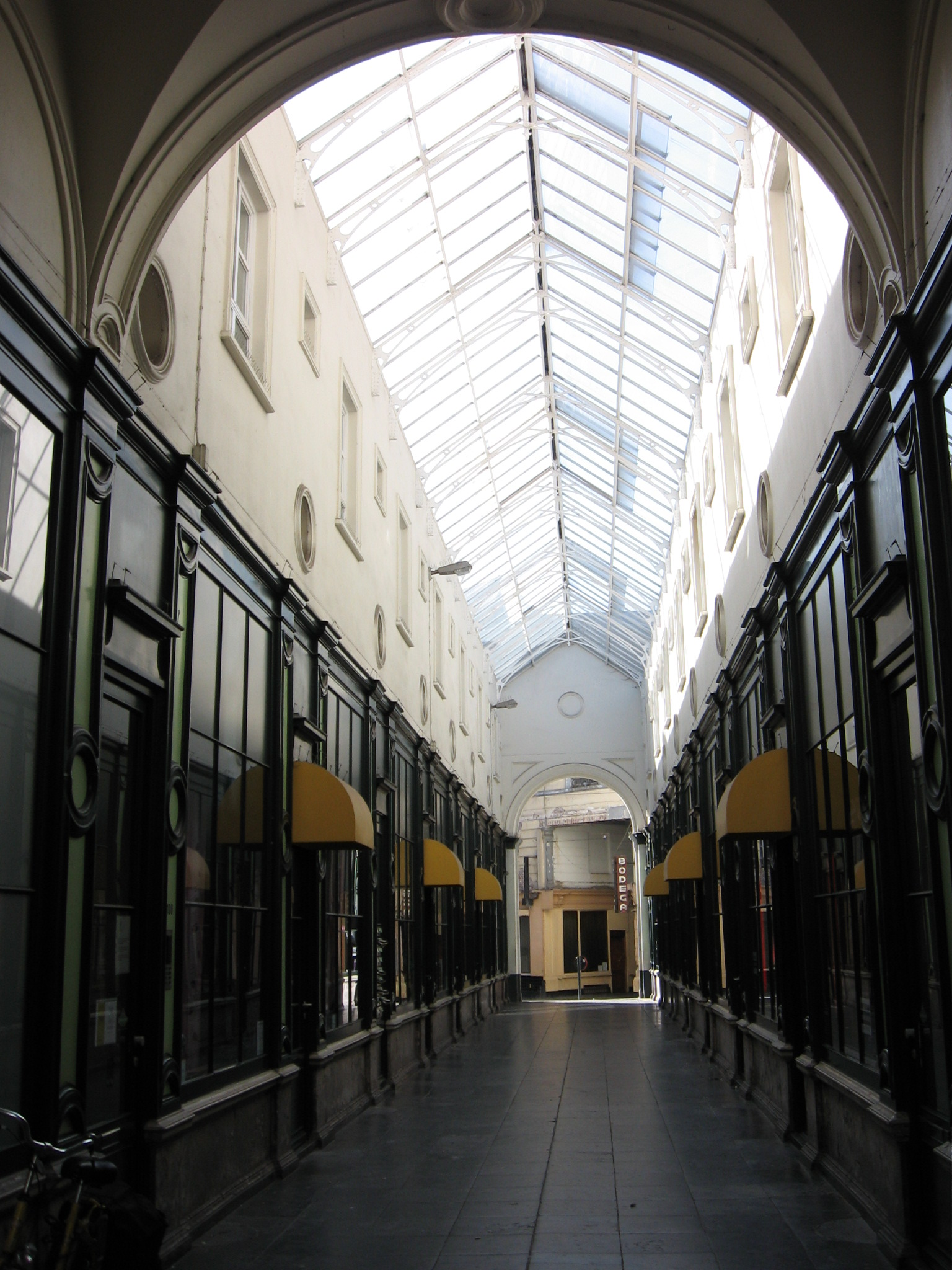
Glazen Straatje, Ghent

Prostitution is legal, though brothels are not. Enforcement of the law can be lax.

- Antwerp
  - Schipperskwartier including Villa Tinto
- Brussels
  - Alhambra Quarter
  - Avenue Louise
  - Place Fontainas
  - Rue d'Aerschot and surrounds
- Charleroi
  - "Charleroi Triangle" (closed 2011)
  - Area around ministère des Finances
  - Faubourg de Bruxelles and the N5, Gosselies
- Deinze
  - Kortrijksesteenweg (N43).
- Ghent
  - Schepenenvijverstraat/Pieter Vanderdoncktdoorgang (including Glazen Straatje)
  - Belgradostraat
- Liège
  - Rue du Champion/Rue de l'Agneau (windows closed in 2009, street prostitution still occurs)
- Ostend
  - hazegras
- Seraing
  - Rue Marnix
  - A purpose built "Eros Centre" is planned than abandoned
- Sint-Truiden
  - Luikersteenweg (know locally as "Chaussée d'Amour")

=== Croatia ===
Prostitution is illegal.

- Zagreb
  - Tkalčićeva Street (defunct since World War II)

=== Czech Republic ===
Prostitution is legal, but brothels and other forms of procuring are prohibited.

- Prague
  - Perlovka

Ostrava

=== Denmark ===
Prostitution is legal, but running brothels and pimping are illegal.

- Copenhagen
  - Halmtorvet
  - Istedgade

=== Finland ===
Prostitution is legal, but running brothels and pimping are illegal.

- Helsinki
  - Aleksis Kiven katu and Vaasankatu

=== France ===
Paying for sex, pimping and keeping a brothel are illegal. Prostitutes commit no offence unless soliciting.

- Angers
  - Place Pierre Semard
- Avignon
  - Bourg Neuf
- Béziers
  - Avenue President Wilson
- Bordeaux
  - Quartier de la Gare Saint Jean
  - Quartier Saint-Rémi
  - Les Quinconces
- Caen
  - Saint Saveur (defunct)
  - Presqu'île de Caen
- Cannes
  - La croisette
- Le Havre
  - rue LeSueur/rue Haudry/rue Laperouse (defunct)
- Lille
  - Quartier Peuple Belge (defunct)
  - La Madeleine (defunct)
- Limoges
  - Champ de Juillet (defunct)
- Lyon
  - Gare de Perrache
  - River "quais"
- Mantes-la-Jolie
  - Quartier du Val Fourré
- Marseille
  - La Canebière
- Montpellier
  - Boulevard de Strasbourg
- Nancy
  - Rue de la Source
- Nantes
  - Rue Paul Bellamy
  - Quai de la Fosse
  - Rue de Strasbourg
  - Rue de Talensac
- Nice
  - Promenade des Anglais
  - Rue de France
- Paris
  - Beaubourg (17c now defunct), including:
    - Rue Gratte-Cul, now Rue Dussoubs
    - Rue Maubuée, now Rue de Venise
    - Rue du Poil-au-Con, now Rue du Pélican
    - Rue Pute-y-Musse, now Rue du Petit-Musc
    - Rue Tire-Vit, now Rue Marie-Stuart
    - Rue Trousse-Nonnain, now Rue Beaubourg
    - Rue Troussevache, now rue de La Reynie
  - 1st arrondissement
    - Rue Saint-Denis
  - 3rd arrondissement
    - Rue Trace-Putain (defunct) later rue Tasse-Nonnain, now part of Rue Beaubourg
  - 4th arrondissement
    - Rue Brisemiche (Defunct) later rue Baillehoë and now part of Rue Brisemiche
  - 9th arrondissement
    - Barbès-Rochechouart
    - Rue de Budapest (defunct)
    - Quartier Pigalle (defunct)
  - 10th arrondissement
    - Porte Saint-Martin
  - Bois de Boulogne
  - Bois de Vincennes
- Rouen
  - Boulevard des Belges
  - Rue St Jacques
- Strasbourg
  - Avenue de la Forêt-Noire
  - Route du Rhin
  - Quai des Alpes
  - Quai Louis-Pasteur
  - Boulevard de Lyon Quartier de la Gare
- Toulouse
  - Rue Bayard
  - Quartier du Canal
  - Boulevard de Strasbourg
- Troyes

=== Germany ===
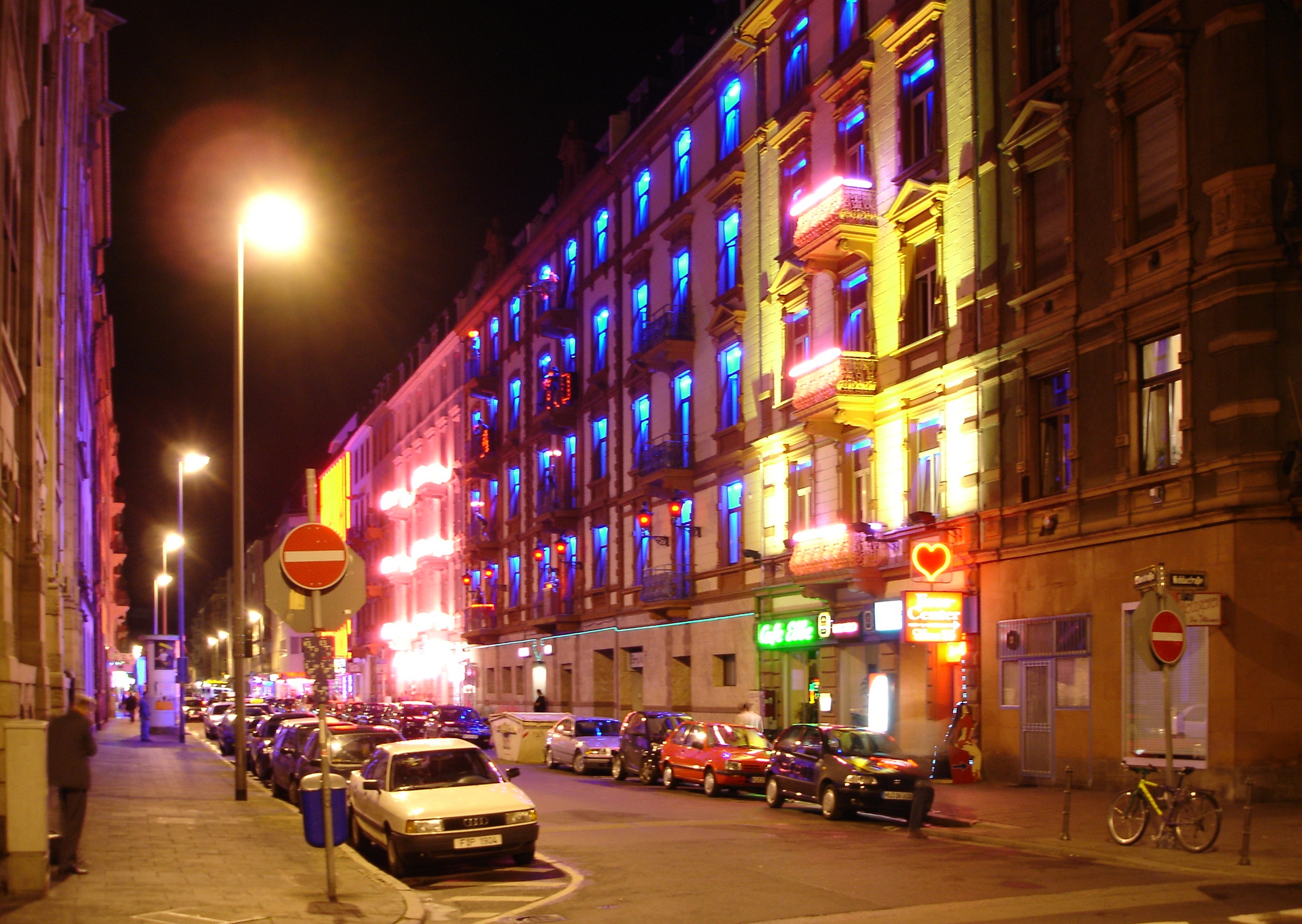
Bahnhofsviertel in Frankfurt am Main

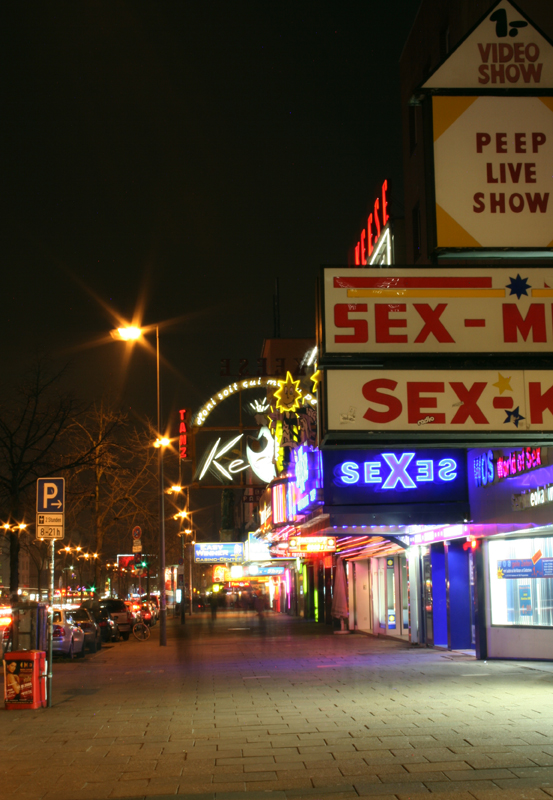
Reeperbahn in Hamburg-St. Pauli

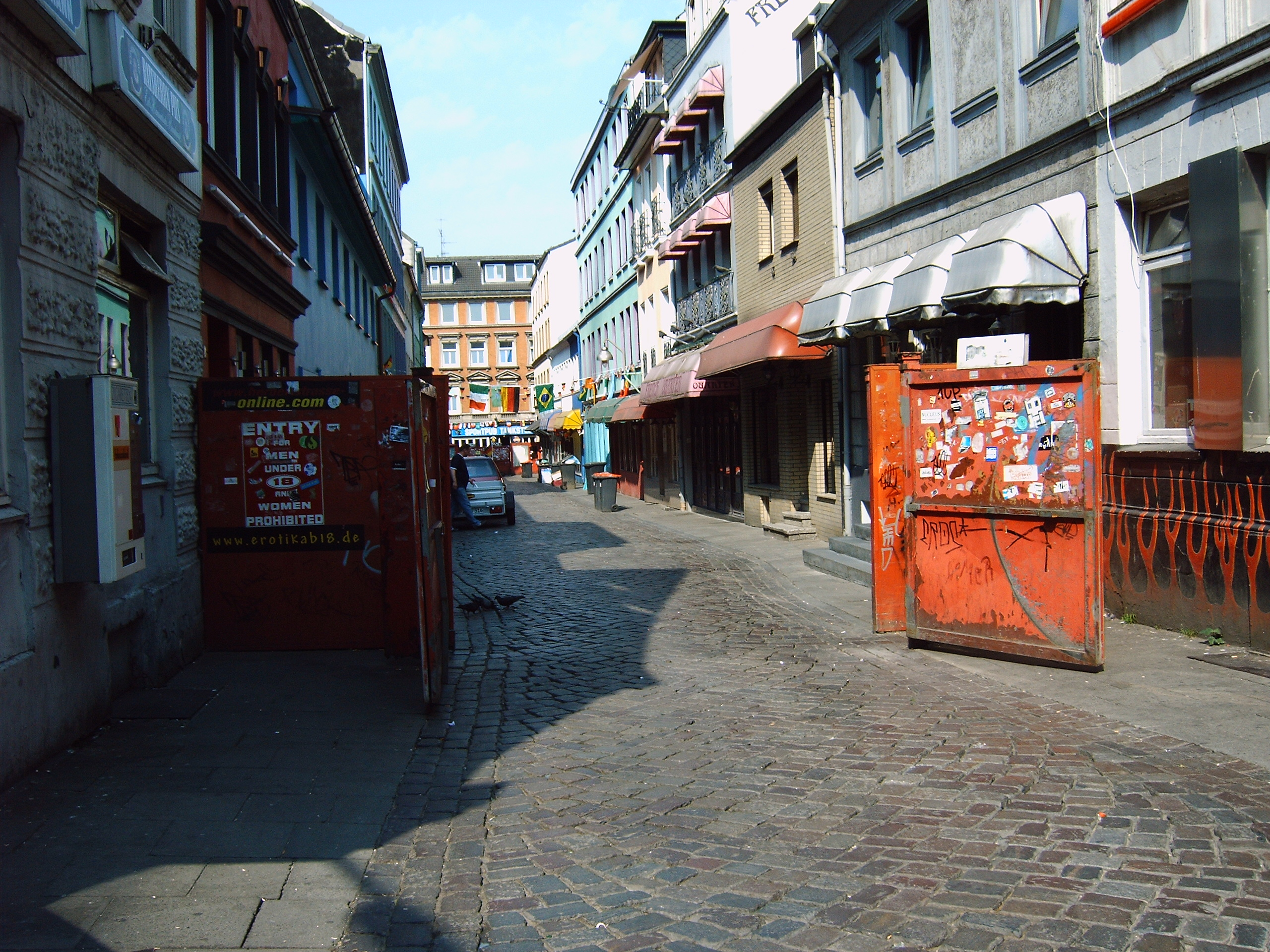
Herbertstraße in Hamburg-St. Pauli

Prostitution is legal and regulated.

- Aachen
  - Antoniusstraße
- Augsburg
  - Hasengasse
- Berlin
  - Bülowstraße
  - Kurfüstendamm (defunct)
  - Kurfürstenstraße
  - Oranienburger Straße
  - Potsdamer Straße (defunct)
  - Stuttgarter Platz (defunct)
- Bielefeld
  - Eckendorferstraße
- Bochum
  - Im Winkel
- Bonn
  - Immenburgstraße
- Braunschweig
  - Bruchstraße
- Bremen
  - Die Küste (defunct)
  - Helenenstraße
  - Punkendeich (defunct)
- Bremerhaven
  - Lessingstraße
- Cologne
  - Hornstraße
- Darmstadt
  - Bismarckstraße
- Dortmund
  - Linienstraße
  - Ravensberger Straße (defunct)
- Duisburg
  - Vulkanstraße
- Düsseldorf
  - Hinter dem Bahndamm
- Essen
  - Stahlstraße
- Flensburg
  - Oluf-Samsons-Gang
- Frankfurt
  - Bahnhofsviertel
  - Breite Gasse
- Hagen
  - Düppenbeckerstraße
- Hamburg
  - St. Georg
  - St. Pauli: area around Reeperbahn
- Hanover
  - Am Steintor
  - Ludwigstraße
  - Reitwallstraße
- Karlsruhe
  - Brunnenstraße
- Kiel
  - Wall am Hafen
- Lübeck
  - Clemensstraße (defunct)
- Mannheim
  - Lupinenstraße
- Minden
  - Rampenloch (defunct, last 2 brothels closed in 2018)
- Munich
  - Landsberger Straße
  - Schillerstraße
  - Stahlgruberring
- Nuremberg
  - Frauentormauer
- Oberhausen
  - Flaßhofstraße
- Stuttgart
  - Leonhardsviertel
- Ulm
  - Blaubeurer Straße

=== Gibraltar ===
Prostitution is illegal.

- Seruya's Ramp, (Calle Peligro) (defunct)

=== Greece ===
Prostitution is legal and regulated.

- Athens
  - Fylis Street
  - Metaxourgeio Area
- Piraeus
  - Troumpa (defunct)

=== Ireland ===
Paying for sex is illegal, as is soliciting in a public place, operating brothels, and other forms of pimping.

- Dublin
  - Monto (defunct)
  - Grafton Street (defunct)

=== Italy ===
Prostitution in Italy is legal, although organized prostitution, whether indoors in brothels or controlled by third parties, is prohibited.

- Catania, Sicily
  - San Berillo
- Venice
  - Carampane di Rialto, including Ponte delle Tette (defunct)

=== Lithuania ===
Prostitution in Lithuania is illegal.

- Vilnius bus station and Vilnius railway station area

=== Luxembourg ===
Prostitution is legal, but running brothels and pimping are illegal.

- Luxembourg railway station area

=== Malta ===
Prostitution is legal, but running brothels and pimping are illegal.

- Gżira
  - Mello Area (Triq Testaferrata)
- Marsa
  - Albert Town Area
- St. Julian's
  - Paceville
- Valletta
  - Strait Street – known as "The Gut" by the British Navy (defunct)

=== Netherlands ===
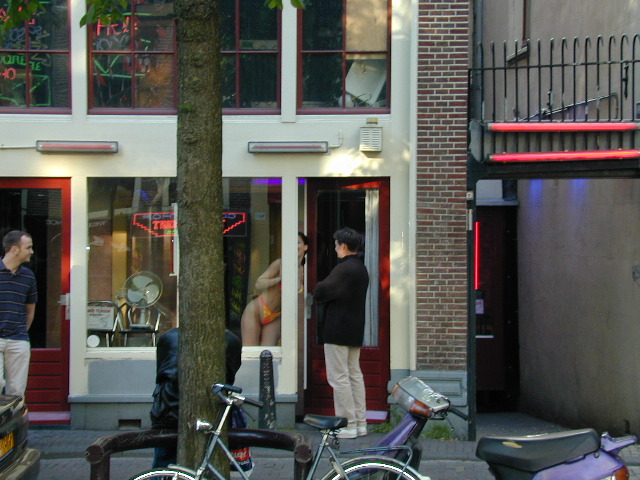
A scene from De Wallen, Amsterdam's red light district, of a man negotiating with a sex worker

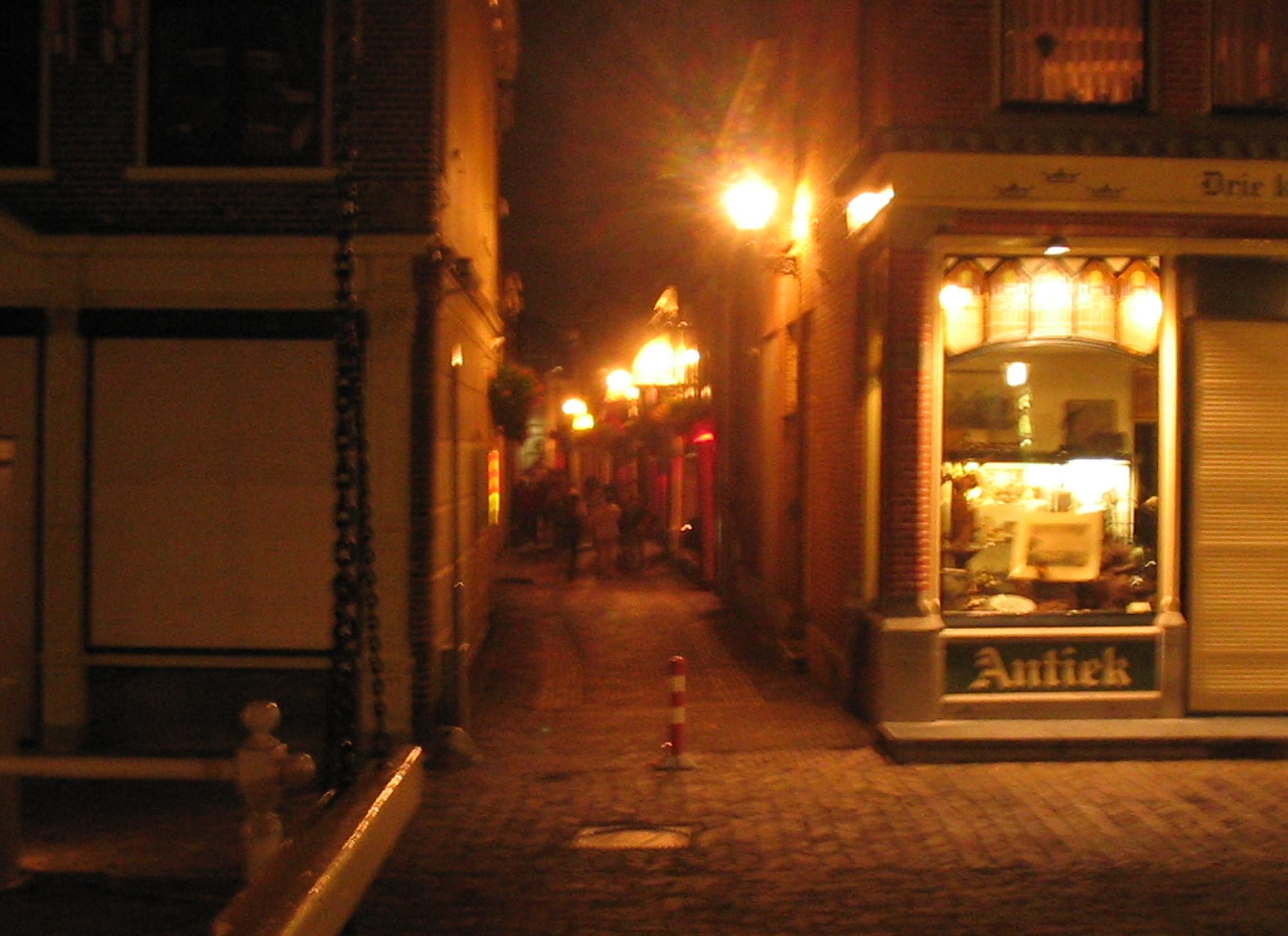
Achterdam at night (Alkmaar)

Prostitution and associated activities are legal and common. A total of 11 cities in the Netherlands have red light districts with window prostitution.

- Alkmaar
  - Achterdam
- Amsterdam
  - De Wallen
  - Singel
  - de Pijp
- Arnhem – closed 2006
- Deventer
  - Bokkingshang
- Doetinchem
  - Roerstraat
- Eindhoven
  - Baekelandplein
- Groningen
- Haarlem
- The Hague
  - Geleenstraat
  - Hunsestraat
  - Doubletstraat
- Heerenveen
  - Munnikstraat
- Leeuwarden
- Nijmegen
  - New Market
- Rotterdam – closed 2003
  - Keileweg
- Utrecht – closed 2013
  - Hardebollenstraat
  - Zandpad

=== Portugal ===
Prostitution is legal, but running brothels and pimping are illegal.

- Lisbon
  - Cais do Sodré (defunct)
  - Rua Nova do Carvalho (defunct)
- Porto
  - Rua Coelho Neto
  - Rua Conde de Ferreira
  - Rua Escura
- Braga
  - Residencial Cairense

=== Serbia ===
- Belgrade
  - Picin park
  - Plavi most
- Novi Sad
  - Kaćka petlja
  - Partizanska street

=== Spain ===
Brothels are illegal (since 1956), but "clubs" and "wiskerias" are fronts for prostitution and are tolerated.

- Barcelona
  - Barrio Chino,
    - Carrer de Sant Ramon
    - Carrer d'En Robador
  - La Rambla
  - Ronda de Sant Antoni
- Las Palmas de Gran Canaria
  - Calle Molino de Viento
- Madrid
  - Centro
    - Calle Atocha
    - Calle Carretas
    - Calle de Barco
    - Calle del Desengaño
    - Calle de la Ballesta
    - Calle Montera
    - Calle de Valverde
    - Plaza de la Luna
    - Plaza Jacinto Benavente
    - Puerta del Sol
  - Casa de Campo (defunct)
  - Colonia Marconi
  - El Gato industrial area
  - Parque del Oeste
    - Paseo de Camoens
  - Vicálvaro
    - Polígono de Villaverde
- Palma de Mallorca
  - Carrer de la Ferreria
- Salamanca
  - Barrio Chino de Salamanca (defunct)
- Santa Cruz de Tenerife
  - Calle Miraflores
- Valencia
  - Calle de Viana

=== Switzerland ===
Prostitution is legal and regulated.

- Zürich
  - Langstrasse
  - Strichplatz
- Bern
  - Lorraine
- Geneva
  - Les Pâquis
- Lausanne
  - Sevelin

=== United Kingdom ===
==== England ====
Prostitution is not illegal when performed by a person acting alone in private, but public solicitation, brothels and pimping are. The Policing and Crime Act 2009 makes it illegal to pay for sex with a prostitute who has been "subjected to force" and this is a strict liability offence (clients can be prosecuted even if they did not know the prostitute was forced).

- Birmingham
  - Soho Road
- Bradford
  - Manningham – the red light district is situated around Lumb Lane and Manningham Lane and was featured in the TV series Band of Gold.
- Huddersfield
  - Great Northern Street
- Leeds
  - Chapeltown – the traditional red light-area was around the Spencer Place and Avenue Hill streets. This has diminished in importance since the emergence of Holbeck as a red-light district.
  - Holbeck – Under a scheme started in October 2014, initiated by West Yorkshire Police and Leeds City Council, sex workers may trade without fear of arrest on an industrial estate in Leeds' Holbeck district; providing they obey various rules, including only working between 7 pm and 7 am and only working within the area. This scheme was scrapped in 2021.
- Leicester
  - South Highfields (defunct)
- London
  - Gropecunt Lane (possible medieval; defunct)
  - King's Cross
  - Piccadilly Circus (defunct)
  - Bayswater
  - Earl's Court
  - Shepherd Market
  - Soho
- Middlesbrough
  - Over the Border / St Hilda's
- Nottingham
  - Forest Road
  - Mapperley Road
- Plymouth
  - Millbay
- Portsmouth
  - Sailortown (defunct)
- Preston, Lancashire
  - Fletcher Road/St Mary's Street
- Reading
  - Oxford Road and its adjoining streets
- Shrewsbury
  - Grope Lane (medieval; defunct)
  - Mountfields (defunct)
- Stoke-on-Trent
  - Cobridge
- Swindon
  - Manchester Road/Gorse Hill
    - Rivers Way
- Wolverhampton
  - All Saints/Parkfield/ Horseley Fields/West Park

==== Northern Ireland ====
- Belfast
  - Albert Memorial Clock, Belfast (defunct)
  - Amelia Street (defunct)
  - Linenhall Street

==== Scotland ====
- Edinburgh
  - Defunct Leith/Coburg Street/Salamander Street (all defunct)
  - Edinburgh does have brothels, but not a red light district.
- Glasgow
  - Blythswood Square (defunct)

==== Wales ====
- Cardiff
  - Tiger Bay
- Newport
  - Commercial Road, Pillgwenlly (Pill)

== North America ==
=== Antigua and Barbuda ===
Prostitution is legal, but related activities are prohibited.

- St. John's
  - Popeshead Street.

=== Aruba ===
Prostitution is legal and regulated.

- Sint Nicolaas.

=== Barbados ===
Prostitution is legal, but related activities such as brothel keeping and solicitation are prohibited.

- Bridgetown
  - Nelson street

=== Canada ===
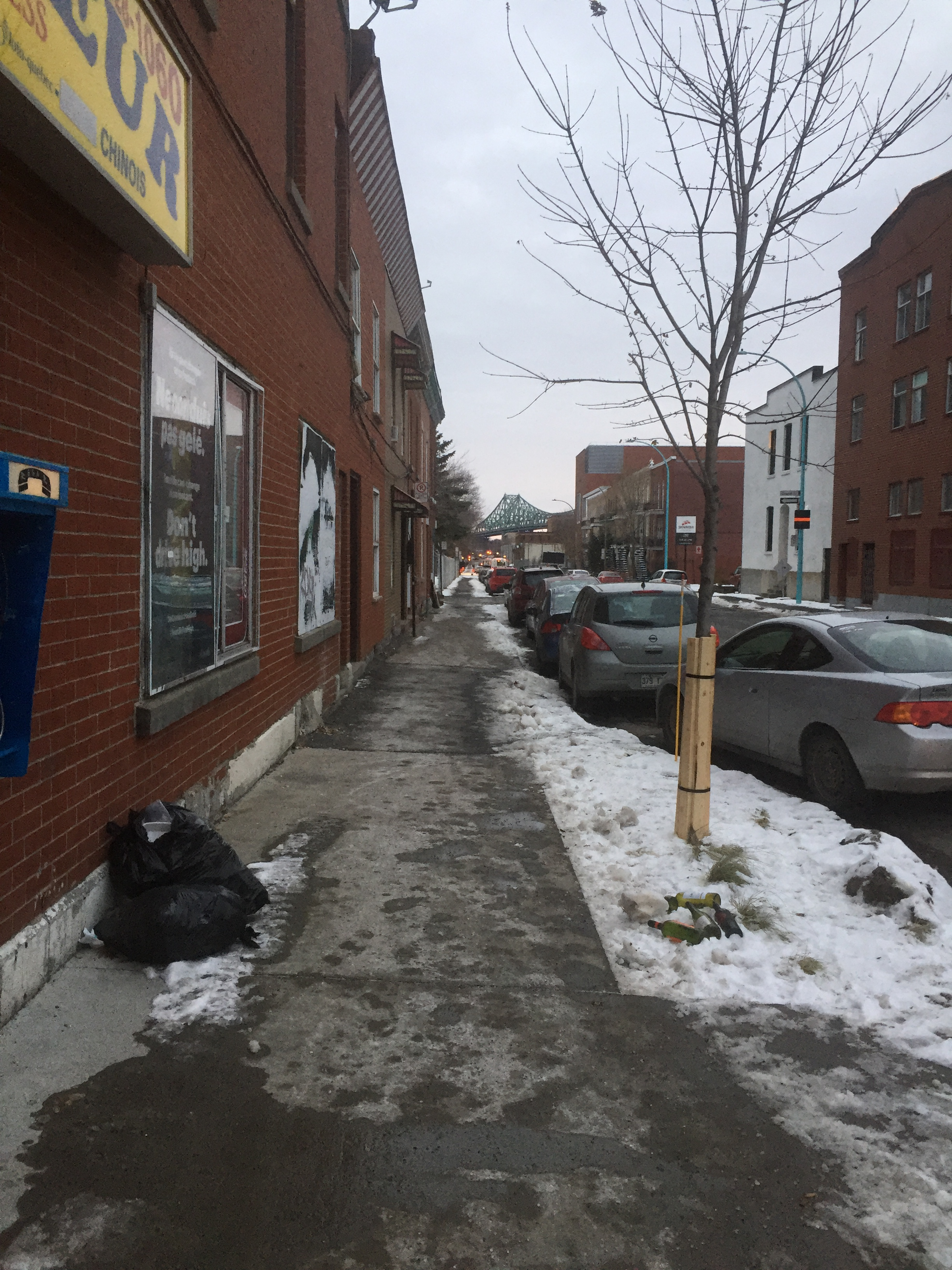
Centre-Sud neighbourhood of Montreal

Prostitution is legal but the purchase of sexual services is not (the client commits the offence not the prostitute). Many associated activities (brothels, advertising, street walking) are also illegal.

- Montreal
  - Red-Light District (historic): The area centred around Saint Catherine Street and Saint-Laurent Boulevard was historically the city's red light district throughout much of the 20th century, as well as being known for strip clubs and sex shops. In recent decades this has changed drastically as the area gentrified into the Quartier des Spectacles and today prostitution is virtually nonexistent.

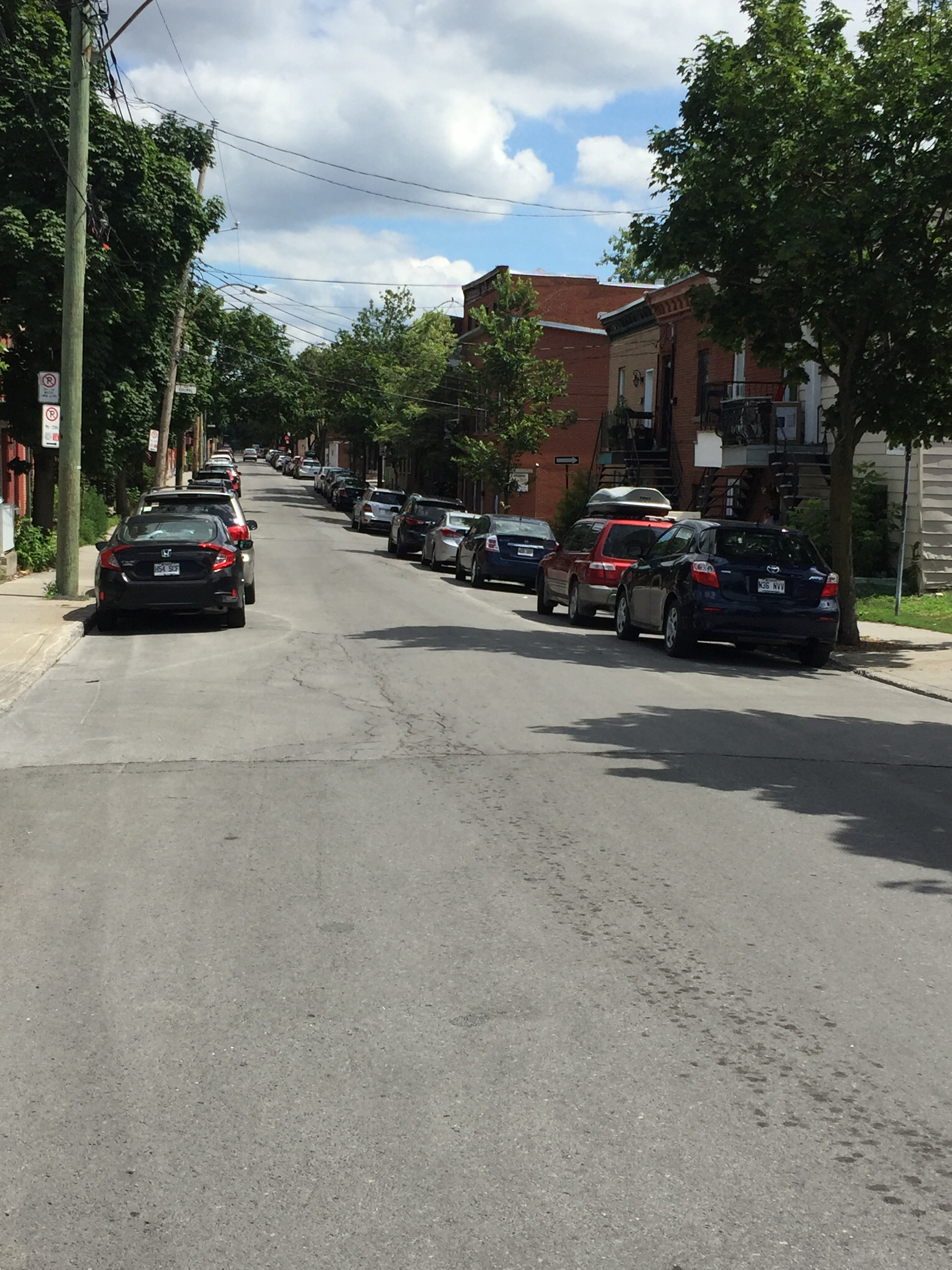
Rue Dufresne, was notorious for prostitution and drug houses from the 1990s to 2010s

  - Centre-Sud: The Centre-Sud, of which Sainte-Marie is a part, was notorious for prostitution from the 1990s well into the 2010s, particularly on Ontario Street and Dufresne Street. In recent years, gentrification has changed this significantly.
  - Hochelaga-Maisonneuve: Known for prostitution, particularly in the lower southwestern Hochelaga segment.
  - Ahuntsic: Located in the north end of Montreal, parts of the Ahuntsic neighbourhood have long been known for prostitution and drugs, partly due to a large presence of cheap motels on Lajeunesse Street and proximity to Quebec Autoroute 40.
- Vancouver
  - Chinatown, Vancouver (historic): Dupont Street, between Westminster Ave (Main Street) and Carrall, was Vancouver's first official red light district which began when Bridie Stewart set up a shop at 101 Dupont. The district was relocated in 1906 to Shanghai and Canton Alley, which collaboratively hosted 105 brothels. It was later closed and relocated to Shore Street, then Alexander in 1912.
  - West End, Vancouver: An unofficial city red-light district located on and around Davie Street. The sex work hub from the 1960s-1983. Coined the "Prostitution Capitol of Canada", which served as a safe community where cisgender, transgender, and two-spirit workers of many ages worked together and looked out for each other's safety. The location of the informative documentary Hookers on Davie. Diminished by the 1983 injunction formed by the Concerned Residents of the West End (CROWE) which forcefully displaced sex workers out of the West End.
  - Downtown Eastside: An unlisted district in Vancouver where workers face routine violence and harassment. The Downtown Eastside is the sex trades final destination of city displacement over several years. In 2003, a large number of sex workers went missing and/or were murdered. Many of these were tied to serial killer Robert Pickton, and were the largest contributor to the missing and murdered indigenous women and girls (MMIWG) cases over the years. Today workers are increasingly facing the effects of new developments and surveillance that are pushing them into isolated areas where they are at greater risk of harm; forcing them to rush or forgo screening and negotiation processes that puts them at a greater risk of bad dates and STI contraction.

=== Costa Rica ===
Prostitution is legal, but related activities such as brothel keeping are illegal.

- San José
  - Gringo Gulch

=== Guatemala ===
Prostitution is legal, but procuring is prohibited.

- Guatemala City
  - La Linea
  - El Trebol
  - Parque Concordia

=== Mexico ===
The Tamyko brothel in Nuevo Laredo, Mexico

Prostitution is legal and regulated.

- Mexico City
  - La Merced Market
  - Zona Rosa
- Nuevo Laredo
  - Zona de Tolerancia
- Tijuana
  - Zona Norte
- Tuxtla Gutiérrez
  - Zona Galáctica

=== Panama ===
- Panama City
  - El Cangrejo

=== United States ===
Prostitution laws vary by state and territory, however it is illegal except for some rural counties of Nevada. Strip clubs are legal in most areas, including fully nude strip clubs. Many massage shops offer "happy endings", which is an illegal form of prostitution, but tolerated.

- Anchorage, Alaska
  - Alley B, Spenard (1914 to 1954)
  - South Addition (Closed 1916)
  - Spenard Road (defunct)
- Ketchikan, Alaska
  - Creek Street (c.1903–1954)
- Skagway, Alaska
  - 7th Avenue (closed c.1910)
- Phoenix, Arizona
  - Van Buren Street
- Tucson, Arizona
  - Miracle Mile
- Los Angeles, California
  - Figueroa Street
  - Sepulveda Boulevard
  - Sunset Boulevard (historical)
  - Western Avenue, Hollywood
- San Diego, California
  - Stingaree (historical)
- San Francisco, California
  - Barbary Coast (historical)
  - Broadway/Columbus Avenue
  - Tenderloin (historic)
- Cripple Creek, Colorado
  - Myers Avenue (defunct)
- Denver, Colorado
  - East Colfax Avenue
  - Market Street (closed 1913)
- Orlando, Florida
  - OBT, also known as Orange Blossom Trail (historical)
- Tampa, Florida
  - Nebraska Avenue (Active)
  - East Adamo Drive, also known as Florida State Road 60
  - Drew Park
- Atlanta, Georgia
  - Cheshire Bridge Road
  - Metropolitan Parkway
  - Murrell's Row
  - Slabtown (defunct)
- Macon, Georgia
  - Oak Street
- Savannah, Georgia
  - Franklin Square area
- Honolulu, Hawaii
  - Chinatown (defunct)
  - Iwilei(defunct)
  - Hotel Street (defunct)
- Chicago, Illinois
  - The Levee (historical)
- Davenport, Iowa
  - Bucktown (historic)
- Council Bluffs, Iowa
  - South 24th Street area
- New Orleans, Louisiana
  - Storyville (historical)
- Shreveport, Louisiana
  - St. Paul's Bottoms (defunct)
- Baltimore, Maryland
  - The Block: The 400 block of East Baltimore St, almost exclusively consists of adult entertainment businesses.
- Boston, Massachusetts
  - Anne Street (historic)
  - The Combat Zone (largely historical, mostly defunct)
- Detroit, Michigan
  - 8 Mile Road
  - Michigan Ave
- Grand Rapids, Michigan
  - Division Avenue
- Milwaukee, Wisconsin
  - River Street (historic)
- Minneapolis, Minnesota
  - Mill District (historic)
- Kansas City, Missouri
  - Independence Ave
- Butte, Montana
  - Venus Alley
- Omaha, Nebraska
  - Burnt District (historic)
  - Sporting District (historical)
- Las Vegas, Nevada
  - Block 16 (closed in 1942)
  - Boulder Highway
  - Fremont Street
  - Las Vegas Strip
- Reno, Nevada
  - The Stockade (closed 1940s)
- Rhyolite, Nevada
  - Tenderloin (Defunct)
- Tonopah, Nevada
  - Corona Avenue area (closed 1915)
  - St. Patrick Street area (closed 1952)
- Atlantic City, New Jersey
  - "The Atlantic City Boardwalk" near the casinos
- New York City
  - "The Deuce" near Times Square. Comprised West 42nd Street between 7th and 8th Avenues. (defunct/culturally significant/historical)
  - Hunts Point, Bronx: Historically known for prostitution and was subject of the film Hookers at the Point
  - Minnesota Strip (defunct)
  - SoHo, Manhattan (historic)
  - Tenderloin, Manhattan (defunct)
  - Christopher Street Pier (defunct) known for its LGBTQ+ prostitution in the 1970s and 1980s. Referenced in shows such as Pose
  - Times Square (defunct/culturally significant/historical)
- Minot, North Dakota
  - High Third (historical)
- Oklahoma City, Oklahoma
  - Hell's Half Acre (historic)
  - Valley Brook
- Chester, Pennsylvania
  - Bethel Court (defunct)
- Philadelphia, Pennsylvania
  - Kensington Avenue, Philadelphia: Known for street prostitution; infamous for The Kensington Strangler who was captured in 2011
  - Northern Liberties (largely historical, mostly defunct)
- Pittsburgh, Pennsylvania
  - Liberty Avenue (historical)
- Dallas, Texas
  - Harry Hines
  - Northwest Highway
- Fort Worth, Texas
  - Hell's Half Acre (historic)
- Houston, Texas
  - The Bissonnet Track
  - Fourth Ward – The Reservation/Happy Hollow (Historical)
- San Antonio, Texas
  - Sporting District (historical)
- Washington, D.C.
  - Murder Bay (defunct)

== Oceania ==
=== Australia ===
Prostitution laws vary by state, either being legal or decriminalized.

- Adelaide
  - Hindley Street
- Brisbane
  - Fortitude Valley
  - Kangaroo Point
  - New Farm
- Canberra
  - Fyshwick
- Kalgoorlie
  - Hay Street
- Melbourne
  - King Street
  - St Kilda
- Sydney
  - Kings Cross
  - Darlinghurst/East Sydney

=== New Zealand ===
Prostitution and associated activities are legal.

- Auckland
  - Karangahape Road
  - Papatoetoe, specifically Hunter's Corner
- Christchurch
  - Manchester Street
- Wellington
  - Vivian Street

== See also ==
- Prostitution by region
- Prostitution law
