= Prostitution in Tunisia =

Prostitution in Tunisia is regulated and confined to two small areas, one in Sfax and the other, Sidi Abdallah Guech in Tunis. Outside these two areas prostitution is illegal.

Although the number of registered prostitutes is low, many work illegally, especially since the closure of most of the red-light districts as a consequence of the Jasmine Revolution in 2011. UNAIDS estimate there to be around 25,000 prostitutes in the country. Sex workers and NGOs report law enforcement to be abusive, inconsistent and corrupt.

== History ==
During the Ottoman period in Tunisia, prostitutes were taxed according to appearance; the better looking the woman, the more she had to pay.

Prostitution was also connected to slavery in Tunisia. The Islamic Law formally prohibited prostitution. However, since the principle of concubinage in Islam in Islamic Law allowed a man to have sexual intercourse with his female slave, prostitution in the Islamic world was commonly practiced by a pimp selling his female slave on the slave market to a client, who was then allowed to have sex with her as her new owner; the client would then cancel his purchase and return the slave to her pimp on the pretext of discontent, which was a legal and accepted method for prostitution in the Islamic world. Slavery was nominally abolished in 1846.

Due to the destitute state of former female slaves and the lack of professions for women in Tunisian society, many former female slaves turned to prostitution after manumission; several decades later, many prostitutes were of slave descent. With the majority of slaves being Black, Blackness came to be associated with hypersexuality and Black prostitutes were in high demand.

Tunisia became a French protectorate in 1881. In 1883 the La Marsa Convention made French law applicable in Tunisia. At that time, brothels and licensed prostitution were legal in France and therefore also in Tunisia. The first maison de tolérance (brothel) appeared in Tunis in 1882. In 1889, a regularity system was introduced, and biweekly medical examinations for prostitutes were made mandatory to try to stop the spread of syphilis.

During the German occupation of France in WWII, the Vichy Government was pressured into further regulating prostitution to try to prevent the spread of STIs amongst German troops. Still controlled by Vichy France, the Tunisian government legalised the status of sex workers as "fonctionnaires" (civil servants) in 1942. Those issued with a fonctionnaires licence were subject to strict regulation. Without a licence, prostitution became illegal. Clients of illegal prostitutes were also criminalised as accomplices. Regulated areas of prostitution were present in most cities.

After Tunisia was occupied by Axis forces in WWII, as in other occupied territories, military brothels were set up, often using interned Jews.

In 1977, the Tunisian Ministry of the Interior amended the 1942 decree to reflect the social and legislative developments the country had undergone.

=== Jasmine Revolution ===
Prior to the 2011 Jasmine Revolution, there were around 300 legal sex workers in about 12 areas including Tunis, Sfax, Sousse, Gabès and Kairouan. Following the revolution, the Islamist government turned a blind eye to fundamentalist action against the red light districts. Many were burnt down; in others the prostitutes were evicted and the buildings wrecked. All but those in Tunis and Sfax were closed, those two being saved by the action of locals preventing the fundamentalists entering the areas until police and military arrived.

In 2014 there was a petition to the Ministry of the Interior to allow the red light district in Sousse to reopen but this was unsuccessful.

== Legislation ==
=== Regulated ===
Regulations for prostitution and brothels were introduced by a Ministry of the Interior decree on April 30, 1942:

- Sex workers need to register and be licensed as fonctionnaires (civil servants)
- Prostitution can only take place in designated areas
- Prostitutes may work independently or in brothels
- Prostitutes may not leave the designated areas except by permit
- Twice weekly medical examinations for STIs are mandatory
- Taxes must be paid
- Time off is only allowed for menstruation
- Sex workers are not allowed to engage in any other occupation
- The use of condoms is compulsory
- Patronnes of brothels must be female, over 35 and have the permission of their husband

=== Non-Regulated ===
Article 231 of The Penal Code:

Except in the cases provided for by the regulations in force, women who, by gestures or words, offer themselves to passers-by or engage in prostitution even occasionally, shall be punished from 6 months to 2 years' imprisonment and 20 To 200 dinars of fine. Everyone who has had sexual intercourse with one of these women is considered as an accomplice and punished with the same penalty.

— Translation from original in French

Generally clients are dealt with less severely, and usually only fined.

== Sex trafficking ==
Tunisia is a source, destination, and possible transit country for men, women, and children subjected to sex trafficking. According to a baseline study published in 2013, Tunisian youth are subjected to various forms of trafficking. International organizations report an increased presence of street children and rural children working to support their families in Tunisia since the 2011 revolution; according to the baseline study, these children are vulnerable to sex trafficking. Tunisian women have reportedly been forced into prostitution under false promises of work both within the country and elsewhere in the region, such as Lebanon, United Arab Emirates, and Jordan. In 2016, the Ministry of Justice (MOJ) reported 22 prosecutions involving forced prostitution.

The United States Department of State Office to Monitor and Combat Trafficking in Persons ranks Tunisia as a "Tier 2" country.
