= Rampenloch =

Street in Minden, Germany

Street in Minden, Germany
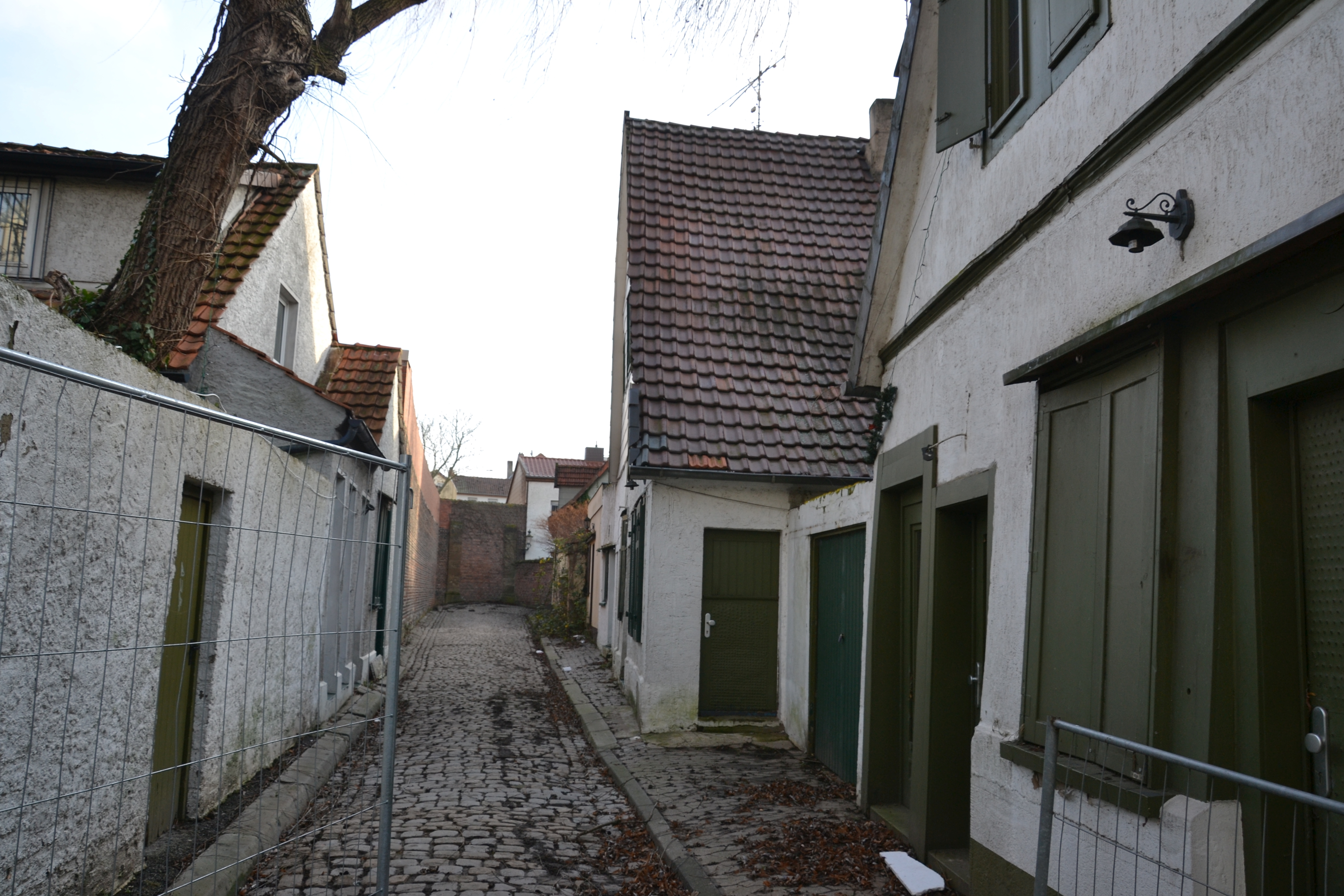
- Rampenloch in January 2020

- Location within Germany
- Location: Minden, North Rhine-Westphalia, Germany
- Coordinates: 52.29°N 8.913333°E
- From: Königswall
- To: Greisenbruch (until c1960)

Other
- Known for: Prostitution

The Rampenloch (German pronunciation: [ˈʁampn̩ˌlɔx]) is a street in the East Westphalian city of Minden in the German state of North Rhine-Westphalia. For a long time the street consisted almost exclusively of brothels. Today the brothels are gone and the street is to be redeveloped.

The history of prostitution in Minden can be traced back to the Middle Ages. The first written records come from this time; it attracted particular attention at the beginning of the 19th century during the Prussian garrison period. The history of prostitution in Minden is so closely interwoven with the history of this street that the ramp hole has become a local synonym for prostitution.

== Etymology ==
The etymological origin of the name Rampenloch has not been conclusively clarified. One theory is the root word is a dialect term for tripe or chitterlings from cattle, indicating that in the 15th century the site was a local garbage heap or knackers yard. (Note: Rampen, also called Ramp, Rampangen, Rampanje, was a dish made from beef offal that was eaten during the 19th century in Westphalia, Hesse and Lower Saxony and still exists today as Rampanien in Thuringia. The term ramps is a dialect term for mesentery and rumen of cattle, which were mostly cooked, eaten with vegetables.) There is a similarly named Rampendahl in Lemgo.

== History ==
=== Architectural history ===
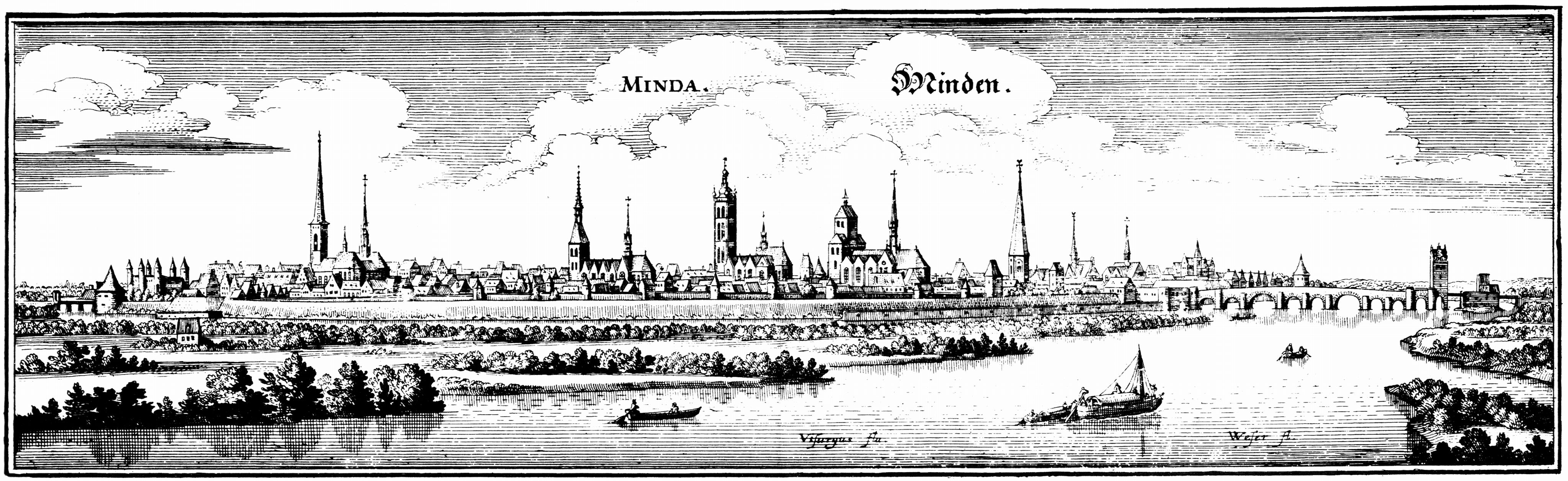
Minden 1641, copper engraving by Matthäus Merian

The corner house, 3 Rampenloch, dates from 1802 and has remained almost unchanged to this day. Built as a master bricklayer's house, it illustrates the living and housing conditions at the beginning of the 19th century and is included in the register of historic monuments. The pavement, laid in 1877, has been preserved. The paving, which is now unique in Minden, is also included in the register of historic monuments. It consists of basalt cobbles for the carriageway, sandstone curbs and clinker brick walkways. From 1908, several prostitutes have been recorded as house owners. After the eastern entrance to the Rampenloch was closed with a wall in around 1960, the street is now only accessible from the Königswall.

=== Disreputable location ===
The Rampenloch, which used to lie outside the city limits, has always been considered a disreputable place that was avoided by the population. In the Middle Ages there was a cemetery for women who had been sentenced to death for child murder. Child murder was relatively widespread at the time, because of the stigmatisation and rejection by society of unmarried mothers. The death penalty was applied for infanticide. As the women were considered too dishonourable for a funeral in a conventional cemetery, they were buried outside the city, mostly in places that were already stigmatised and used for other disposals. Since the time of the Reformation, a public rubbish tip has been documented at the site, from which time the name probably dates. A street which was a settlement for the poor had formed in the 16th century. Residents who were not allowed to live within the city walls due to poverty, illness or for the exercise of dishonourable professions had probably settled there.

=== Minden as a garrison town ===
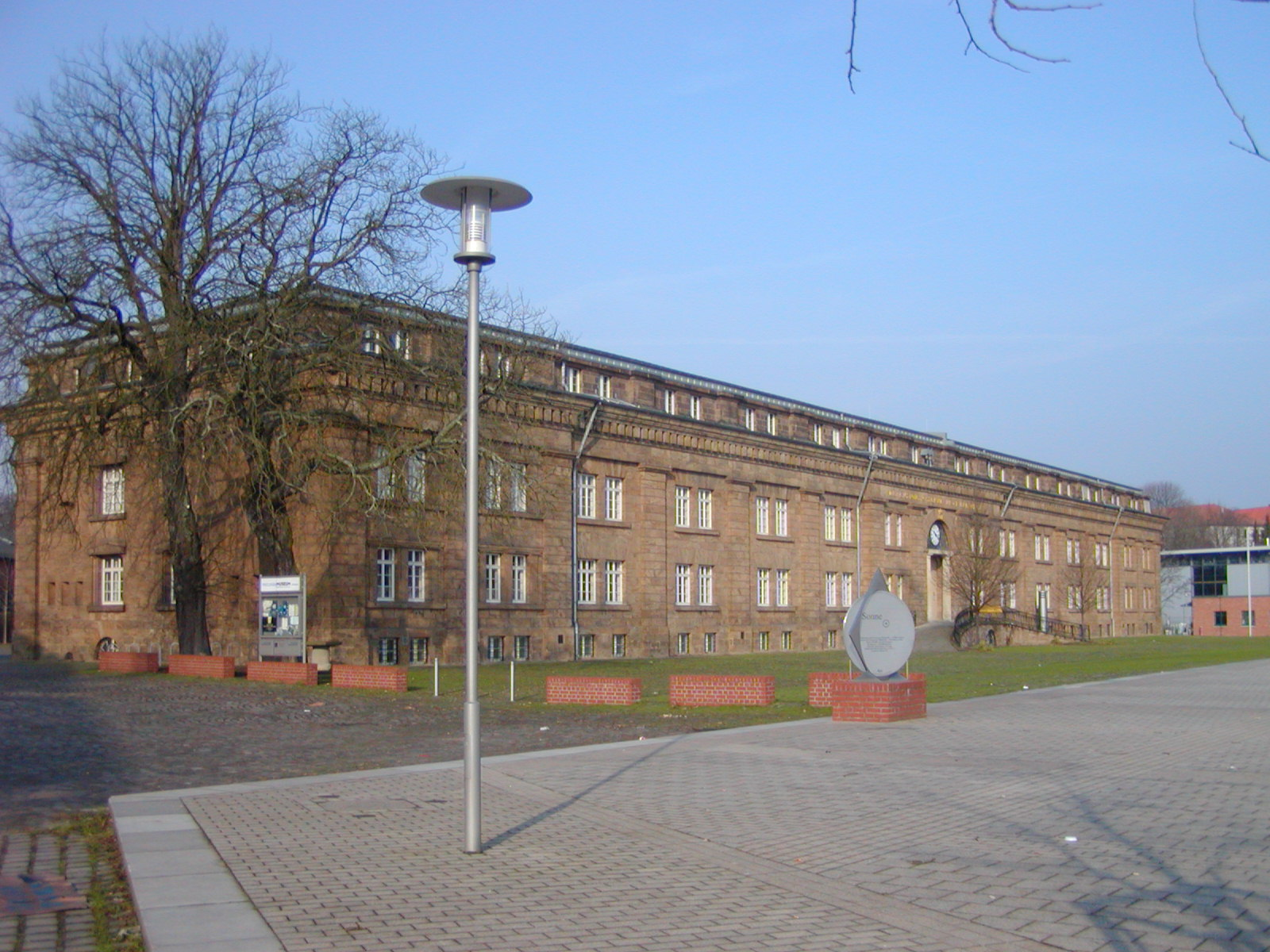
Defensive barracks of the stationed Prussian troops

On November 13, 1806 Minden was occupied by French troops and incorporated into the French Kingdom of Westphalia, where it remained until 1813 when Napoleon I was defeated in the Battle of Waterloo.

During the term of office of the first Minden district administrator in Arnim (1816–1820), the Minden fortress was rebuilt under the supervision of the government of the Minden district. Since Minden was a fortress city, there were a lot of soldiers stationed there, far from their families, which meant that prostitution flourished. Many of the women involved had no other way of making a living. The urban population had become impoverishment which was a consequence of the long occupation by the French, who had imposed economic and social restrictions and sanctions on the local population. Prostitution was the only way for some sections of the female population to avoid complete impoverishment of their families. Lack of education, broken family relationships and illegitimate origins were, according to contemporary statements, factors that made social advancement impossible at that time.

=== Spread of sexually transmitted diseases ===
The dominant form of prostitution was street prostitution; there was no official brothel in the Minden fortress at that time. This became a serious problem for the army as venereal diseases spread. In autumn 1817, 15 soldiers in the Fusilier Battalion alone had contracted venereal diseases. The Minden fortress commander, Major General Ernst Michael von Schwichow, was commissioned with the redesign of Minden's defences. He was in charge of the resulting works, such as the rebuilding of the city fortress, which included the demolition of barracks and the quartering of troops. Since the control of hygiene and the supervision of troop's health also fell within his area of responsibility, his military doctors informed him about the increased infection rate with venereal diseases. Schwichow took the spread of the disease very seriously and soon identified uncontrolled prostitution as the main source of the infection. Unlike the common "moral" way of thinking at the time in dealing with sexuality and its consequences, Schwichow approached things more constructively. According to his theory, the only sensible way to stop the infections, or to bring them down to a tolerable level, was the official determination of the source of the infection - the prostitutes - and their healing, not just that of the soldiers and the city should bear the costs. On November 3, 1817, Schwichow's order was issued that every infected soldier must reveal the place and person by which they were infected:

If he cannot or does not want to indicate this, he should be courageous, but severely punished after recovery.

A lawsuit against a prostitute caused a sensation in nearby Paderborn : On 13 June 1817, in the Paderborn Royal Higher Regional Court, a case was brought against the 17-year-old prostitute, Caroline Klütemeyer, for “ corner prostitution ”, and a day labourer, Wilhelm Heidemann, for tolerating a "whores economy" in his house (he rented a room for the prostitute to use). However, the court acquitted the accused because it believed that prostitution of "dissolute women" was not prohibited as long as it was done under the supervision of the state in the appropriate places.

Since there was no officially permitted brothel in the Prussian Minden fortress, the Paderborn judgement was understood as an indication to work towards the targeted and controlled establishment of brothels. As a result, Schwichow appealed to the Royal Ministry of the Interior to have a brothel built in Minden, in which prostitutes should work under controlled conditions. The city should also pay for the costs. The request was granted because the Ministry of the Interior was also able to determine that in a garrison town like Minden, full of single soldiers, there was a need to regulate prostitution.

=== Control of prostitution ===
Since street prostitution was to be pushed as out of Minden as far as possible, a brothel should be assigned for the prostitutes. Schwichow arranged for the Minden city council to visit the registered prostitutes on 29 November and to give them a choice: either they continued to work with weekly health inspections, under which they would have to pay for their treatment in the event of a diagnosed illness, or they would be banned and punished. Another requirement was that married prostitutes had to present a permit from their husbands in order to continue working legally.

The first brothel was initially a semi-official set-up, as finalising official regulation dragged on until 1823, due to resistance from the population and the district administrator maintaining that a city with under 10,000 inhabitants was too small to have a brothel operation. Finally, on 27 December 1823, the Ministry of the Interior approved an official brothel for soldiers - in view of the need to regulate prostitution in a garrison town. This approval was linked to ministerial criticism of the choice of words by the Minden authority, which Freudenhaus (pleasure house) had taken as the name for a brothel:

Incidentally, I cannot approve of the term "Freudenhaus" used by the royal government, because bad things in themselves cannot and should not be ennobled by changing names, nor is the intended name appropriate because brothels are too often the source of long suffering and remorse.

The first brothel after the city's decree was not at Rampenloch, contrary to the city legends of Minden, but at Heidemann House No. 575 and later Königswall 87, and these were used for prostitution between 1817 and 1846. After the innkeeper's death, the premises on Königswall closed in 1846. In the period that followed, the Minden brothel frequently changed its locations before prostitutes settled at the Rampenloch. There were also brothels at Deichhof and again at Königswall from 1900 to 1910, and also in Soodgasse and Weingarten. However, street prostitution only briefly decreased as a result of the brothels opening.

The closure of the brothels was considered in 1839/1840. Military doctors claimed a significantly lower number of sexually ill patients since the brothel was built: 46 cases in four years. The regimental doctor of 15 Infantry Regiment attributed this on the one hand to the morality of some soldiers, but also referred to the opposite: When the unit was stationed in Wesel, where there were three "mean and cheap" brothels, 22 men were infected in three months. The Minden brothels remained, however, and moved into Rampenloch at the end of the 19th century, which was then considered a street of prostitution.

== Modern times ==
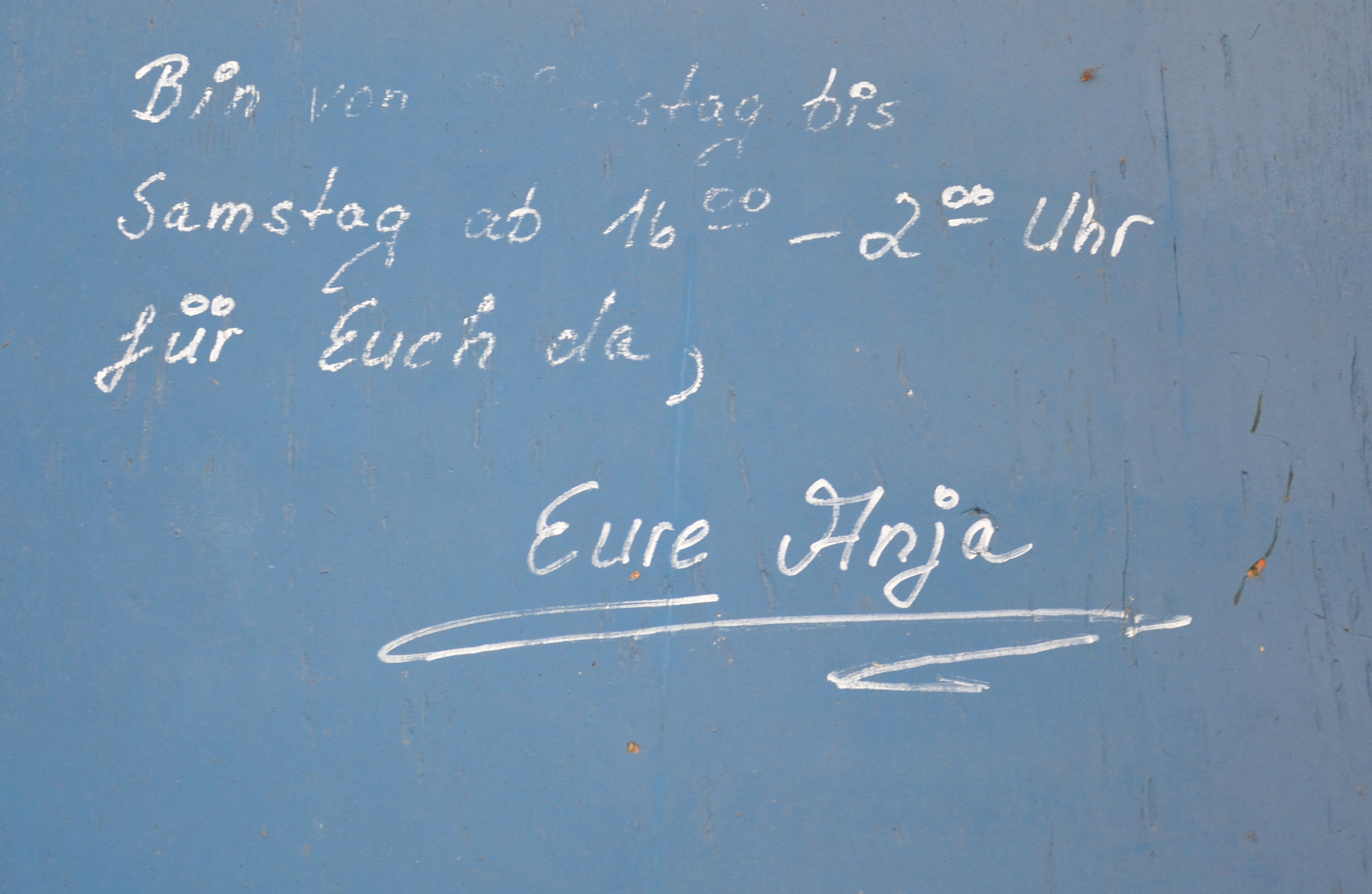
Writing on a door in Rampenloch

Following World War II, the British Army of the Rhine was established in 1945 and Minden was in British Occupation Zone and it became one of the barrack towns of the BAOR. Initially there was a non-fraternisation policy imposed on the soldiers. The War Office notably published that German women "will be willing, if they can get the chance, to make themselves cheap for what they can get out of you" in its handbook distributed to soldiers stationed in Germany. In spite of the ban, soldiers still knowingly had contact with local women. In a report by a British soldier formerly stationed in Germany:

"We drank in the Company club, sinking as much beer as we could and then in groups made for the perimeter wire of the barracks, avoiding the Provost staff led by Vic HOLE, the Provo Sgt in his black tracksuit. We then made our way into the town avoiding the Redcaps, and then settled in various bars in and near 'Rampenloch strass' until we could drink no more, then attempted to get into the Barracks (By a different route of course) to get an hours kip before Muster parade. We always knew who didn't make the return journey by the numbers being 'Beasted' over at the guardroom the following morning, happy days"

Field Marshal Bernard Montgomery, Commander-in-chief (C-in-C) of the BAOR, was against the ban, and it was lifted in July 1945.

Thousands of British soldiers were stationed in Minden, some of them in the Simeons barracks which was close to Rampenloch. Until their departure in 1994, British soldiers were the main income of the prostitutes in Rampenloch. At times the soldiers had to queue outside the brothels, some of them spending all of their pay in the street. Any trouble in the street from the soldiers was quickly dealt with by the military police. Some of the women from the street, suitably attired, were invited to the Officer's Mess at the barracks.

A pupil of the Petershagen high school from 1950 to 1956 recalls his youthful memories of trips to Minden:

[…] What a blast Minden was! That was the world, the big world with all the trimmings, especially the trimmings, the Rampenloch that they only spoke behind their hands, and what had been done there. Even though the pocket money and that 50s tightness only allowed me stolen glances.

In 2008, the Rampenloch celebrated its centenary as a brothel street.

=== Decline, closure and redevelopment ===
The red-light scene in Rampenloch went into a crisis after the British Rhine Army was finally withdrawn in 1994. The last two of brothels closed in 2018 and the City of Minden purchased the properties. The city had previously brought other properties in the street as they became available, as part of the district's urban re-development. As two of the houses are listed and the paving of the street is also listed total redevelopment is not possible. The city's “Living action plan” of 2017, which includes a stock of housing, is expected to form an important basis for the scheme. An initial interest procedure started in January 2020 with concepts submitted to the city's urban planners. A specialist committee will select a preferred concept in November 2020. The successful applicant will then have a year to submit detailed proposals and costings for the full council for approval.

== In the theatre ==
A play was dedicated to the brothel street, Rampenloch – er nun wieder, as part of Minden's 1200th anniversary celebrations. The play premiered in 1998 at the Tucholsky theatre in Minden and 17 performances were staged. The play was performed again in 2009 under the title of Rampenloch - ten years after, this time the play was performed on Rampenloch.

== See also ==
- Prostitution in Germany

== Notes and references ==
=== Bibliography ===
- Bronisch, Matthias. "Roman-u". gymnasium-petershagen.de (in German). Archived from the original on 14 October 2007.
- Kaspar, Fred (13 September 2009). "Das Rampenloch" (PDF). Denkmal-Zeitung (in German).
- McLynn, Frank (2007). 1759: The Year Britain Became Master of the World. Open Road + Grove/Atlantic. ISBN 9780802199157.
- Lewerenz, Susann (18 December 2019). "Interessenbekundungsverfahren für das Rampenloch startet am 6. Januar" [Expression of interest for the ramp hole starts on 6 January]. City of Minden (in German).
- Mielke, Heinz-Peter (1982). "Soziale Phänomene in einer Festungsstadt im 19. Jahrhundert [Social phenomena in a fortress town in the 19th century]". In Schmidtchen, Volker (ed.). Festung, Garnison, Bevölkerung: historische Aspekte der Festungsforschung; die Vorträge des 2. Internationalen Kolloquiums zur Festungsforschung, Minden [Fortress, garrison, population: historical aspects of fortress research; the lectures of the 2nd International Colloquium on Fortress Research, Minden] (in German). Wesel.
- Noakes, Lucy (2006). Women in the British Army: War and the Gentle Sex, 1907–1948. Routledge. ISBN 978-1-134-16783-8.
- Public Information Services BAOR (1990). Britische Armee in Der Bundesrepublik und Berlin [British Army in the Federal Republic and Berlin]. Public Information Services BAOR.
- Royle, Trevor (2019). Facing the Bear: Scotland and the Cold War. Birlinn. ISBN 978-1-78885-085-8.
- Steffen, Margret (11 September 2009). "Vokabeln für Eingeweihte" [Vocabulary for initiates]. Deutsche Welle (in German). Archived from the original on 16 April 2021.
- Steffen, Martin (20 October 2016). "Preußens freie Liebe" [Prussia's free love]. Amtage.de (in German).
