= Reitwallstraße =

Street in Hanover, Germany

Street in Hanover, Germany
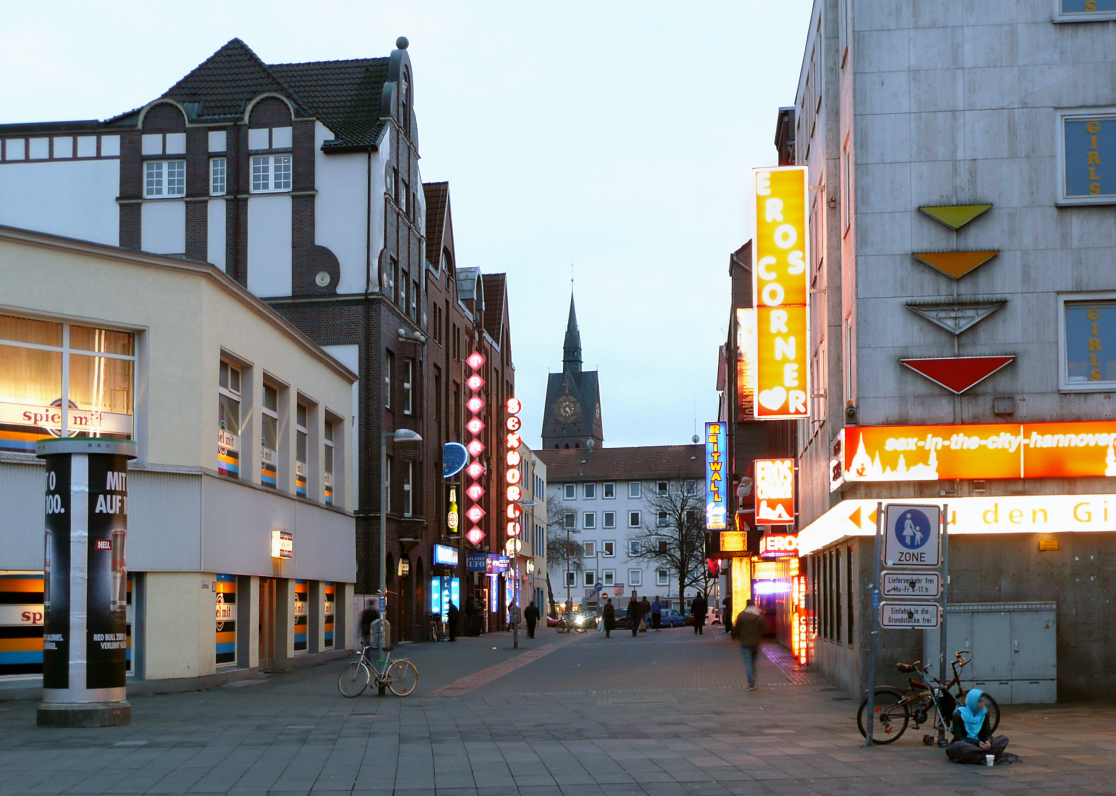
- View into Reitwallstraße

- Location within Germany
- Location: Hanover, Lower Saxony, Germany
- Coordinates: 52°22′30″N 9°43′58″E
- From: Goethestraße
- To: Am Marstall

Other
- Known for: Prostitution, strip clubs

The Reitwallstraße (German pronunciation: [ˈʁaɪtvalˌʃtʁaːsə], lit. 'Riding Wall Street') is a street in Hanover, Germany. Situated near the pedestrianised Stone Gate Square, it is part of the red-light district bounded by Reuterstraße, Goethestraße, Reitwallstraße and Am Marstall, crossed by Scholvinstraße. It is known for strip clubs and prostitution in Germany.

== History ==
The name of the street derives from the riding facilities it contained and the proximity to the city wall. On an 1834 map it is shown as the "riding by Hanover's walls of fortification" and ran from Steintor to the Leine, a tributary of the river Aller. There was a riding school, a riding arena and stables, which belonged to the court stables of the Leineschloss. Around the middle of the 19th century, the street was renamed Schillerstraße (later Am Marstall), and the name "Reitwallstraße" given to the side street that currently bears it.

The address Reitwallstraße 15 was the location of the printing and publishing house called Berenbergsche Buchdruckerei, which published, amongst others, the 1846 court and state handbook for the Kingdom of Hanover.

=== Modern ===
The Reitwallstraße now extends between Goethestraße and Am Marstall, where its situation is rated by the local police as "delicate"; 300 crimes occurred in this area alone between early 2009 and 2010. It is considered a retreat for drug dealers and thugs. The road was declared a "dangerous place" for the purposes of Lower Saxon law on public order and safety.

The entertainment area of the red light district with brothels, strip clubs, clubs, bars and tattoo shops was under the control of the Hells Angels for many years. The "king" of the area was Frank Hanebuth until 2011. He was the leader of the Bones outlaw motorcycle club, which in 1999 amalgamated with the Hells Angels. In 2010, the Hells Angels met with rivals, the Bandidos, in the restaurant Little Italy and under lawyer Götz von Fromberg agreed a peace treaty. The Hanover Hells Angels were dissolved in 2012 as the Lower Saxony government was on the brink of banning the Hells Angels and the following year the Black Jackets attempted to control the district.

Reitwallstraße has declined as a red-light district in recent years. A plan for a new 167 room hotel on the street was proposed in 2019, and also in 2019 the laufhaus Sexworld was closed and converted into 20 apartments.
