= Die Küste (Bremen) =

Former entertainment district in Bremen, Germany

- Stadtteil of Bremen
- Interactive map of Die Küste
- Location within Germany Location within Bremen
- Coordinates: 53.09801°N 8.7766°E
- Country: Germany
- State: Bremen
- City: Bremen
- Time zone: UTC+01:00 (CET)
  - Summer (DST): UTC+02:00 (CEST)

Die Küste (English: The Coast) was the former entertainment district at the Port of Bremen in Bremen, Germany. Die Küste evolved at the exit of the free port (Überseestadt) on the Nordstraße. It was linked to the Walle district by a foot tunnel, the Stinkbüdelmannsgang. The area was also known as the Küstenmeile (Coast mile) and Klein-St. Pauli, drawing similarities to the Hamburg red-light district of St. Pauli. Today there are still a few bars still in existence dating from the days of Die Küste.

== History ==
Bamboo bar

Between Reykjavik and Africa,
in the Bamboo Bar in Bremen,
Sailing Boys sit from far and near,
eating different things.
It starts with the soft things
because you have to get in the mood.
A sharp mixture then follows
and the big fireworks at the end.

If a Heini lives like a wild man
in the Bamboo Bar in Bremen,
the sailor must
take over the upbringing with a trained fist.
It starts with the soft things
because you have to get in the mood.
A sharp mixture then follows
and the big fireworks at the end.

Nowhere is it as cozy as
in the Bamboo Bar in Bremen.
All women have bare knees
and tender behaviour.
It starts with the soft things
because you have to get in the mood.
A sharp mixture then follows
and the big fireworks at the end.

— Poem by Manfred Hausmann c.1954

Bremen's ports were extensively damaged by Allied bombing during World War II. Post-war, the docks were rebuilt and by the early 1950s the volume of goods passing through the ports had risen to pre-war levels. With the increasing shipping traffic at the time, more and more seafarers came to the ports of Bremen. An estimated one million seafarers came to Bremen in 1951.

Die Küste's heyday was in the 1950s and 1960s. Many seafarers came to Die Küste when their ships docked and they had been paid. There were approximately 35 bars and dance venues, especially in the 1950s and 1960s. The Arizona, Krokodil (Crocodile), Bambus-Bar (Bamboo bar) and the notorious Golden City were amongst the better know of the bars.

Many American soldiers were stationed at Bremen during the Allied-occupied Germany. Crews of American warships also had shore leave in Bremen. On one occasion it was estimated that American sailors had spent DM 90,000 in Bremen in a 36-hour period, some of this in Die Küste.

The photographer Carla Bockholt was active on the Die Küste from around 1948 to the late 1960s: she moved from restaurant to restaurant and took souvenir photos for the guests.

Containerization first started in the Bremen port in the 1960s, with the first container being unloaded in 1966. In the 1950s a gang of 17 could unload 18 tons of general cargo in a shift. By the 1980s, half that number of men could unload a hundred times that in the same time. Not only did this reduce the number of dockers required, the ships spent less time in the port so shore leave for the sailors was drastically reduced. Die Küste suffered as a result. Cashless payment of wages prevailed in the 1970s. The main source of income for the clubs and bars on Die Küste, the seafarers, no longer came and the area declined.

== Prostitution ==
Sailors returning from sea had money in their pockets and want alcohol and sex. A 1954 police report stated "If a sailor returns to the port after months at sea, he expects hard drinks and female beings!" Bars opened in Die Küste and prostitutes used the bars to pick up clients. A 1953 official report included a reference to the Hawaii-Bier-Bar: "Soon after it opened, it became a refuge for all prostitutes and other dark elements."

Selected taxi drivers were employed to take prostitutes to clients and also the clients to the prostitutes. Sometimes they would ring the doorbell when the clients time was up.

In the 1970s, prostitutes were required to have a health card. Part of the requirements of the card was regular health checks, and any prostitute found to have an STI had their health card withdrawn.

== Modern times ==
Hardly any clubs of that time have survived to this day, although the Bambus-Bar, Happy Night and Elefant und Krokodil still exist on Nordstraße. There is also a brothel on Leutweinstraße. Regeneration of the docklands to form the Überseestadt district began in 2009. The “Golden City” project, which began in 2013 through crowdfunding, is cultural project which, in the summer months, pays tribute to the memory of the heyday of the Die Küste with a themed bar called "Golden City".

== See also ==
- Prostitution in Germany
