= Helenenstraße =

Street in Bremen, Germany

Street in Bremen, Germany
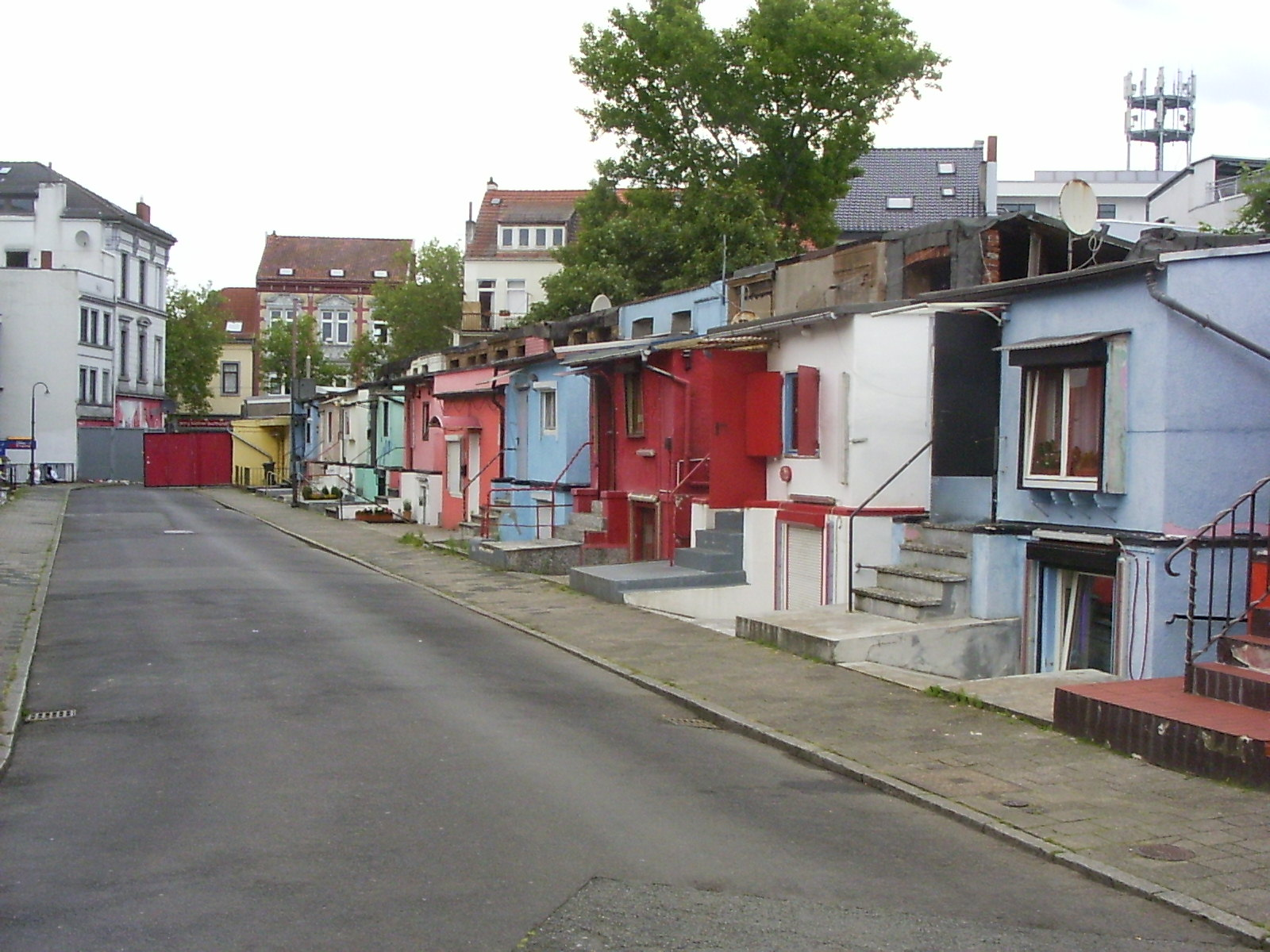
- Helenenstraße in 2014
- Interactive map of Helenenstraße
- Former name: Frankenstraße
- Location: Stone Gate district, Bremen, Germany
- Coordinates: 53.072222°N 8.826389°E
- From: Vor dem Steintor

Other
- Known for: Prostitution

The Helenenstraße is a street in the Steintor locality in the eastern suburbs of Bremen, Germany. The street was built in the 19th century and is known for prostitution.

== Construction ==
The building contractor Carl Philip Weiland erected the buildings of today's Helenenstraße, which he originally planned as a connecting street between Vor dem Steintor and Auf der Kuhlen. A widow, Helene Engelken, denied him the sale of her land preventing the street joining Auf der Kuhlen, so the street became a cul-de-sac off of Vor dem Steintor. It is the only real dead-end in this part of Bremen. The building contractor named the street from the widow's first name. The Helenenstraße was built in a Wilhelminian style, which is also seen in other Bremen houses of the era.

== Designation as a street of prostitution ==
Shortly after the construction, the street was designated as a street of prostitution by a decree of the Bremen Senate in 1878. Under the decree, prostitution would only be permitted in Bremen in the form of a “controlled and regulated prostitution” in Helenenstraße. The prostitutes were registered and a police station was set up at the entrance to the street to avoid pimping. The main purpose of the decree was to prevent the spread of venereal diseases in Bremen. Strict importance was attached to the use of condoms and medical supervision. The buildings were equipped with toilets and there was a bath room. Under the "female controls" police ordinance, prostitutes were prohibited from speaking to men or attracting them outside the street; they were not allowed to visit theatres or museums, to keep dogs or cats and not even to enter the parks on Wallgraben or the Bürgerpark. The prostitutes were also not permitted to leave their houses after dark, travel in open carriages or public vehicles, live with a man, dine with each other or socialise outside the street. Despite the strict regulations, there were protests against the establishment of Helenenstraße; as early as 1879, a petition with 2,200 signatures against this facility was submitted, but this did not lead to any change.

Helenenstraße was the first controlled street of prostitution in the then German Reich. The Senate and State Councillors of Bremen were proud of this unique facility. The Senate even made a wooden model of Helenenstraße and presented it at international health fairs in Paris, New York and Moscow.

== Temporary prohibition of prostitution ==
In the spring of 1926, 50 prostitutes petitioned the Bremen Senate for more protection in the Helenenstraße which was opposed by the Bremen women's movement. Under pressure from the women's movement, communist and social democratic deputies, the Senate prohibited prostitution in the street in October that year. Helenenstraße was renamed Frankenstrasse. Since many of the prostitutes on Helenenstraße had become owners of the houses, prostitution was now continued illegally in the street. Under the rule of the National Socialists, prostitution in Helenenstraße was again permitted in 1934 and the street's name changed back to Helenenstraße in 1936. During the Second World War the street suffered considerable bomb damage by British air raids. In contrast to the rest of the city, the bomb damage is still evident in the street, although one side of the street was rebuilt after the war.

== Modern times ==
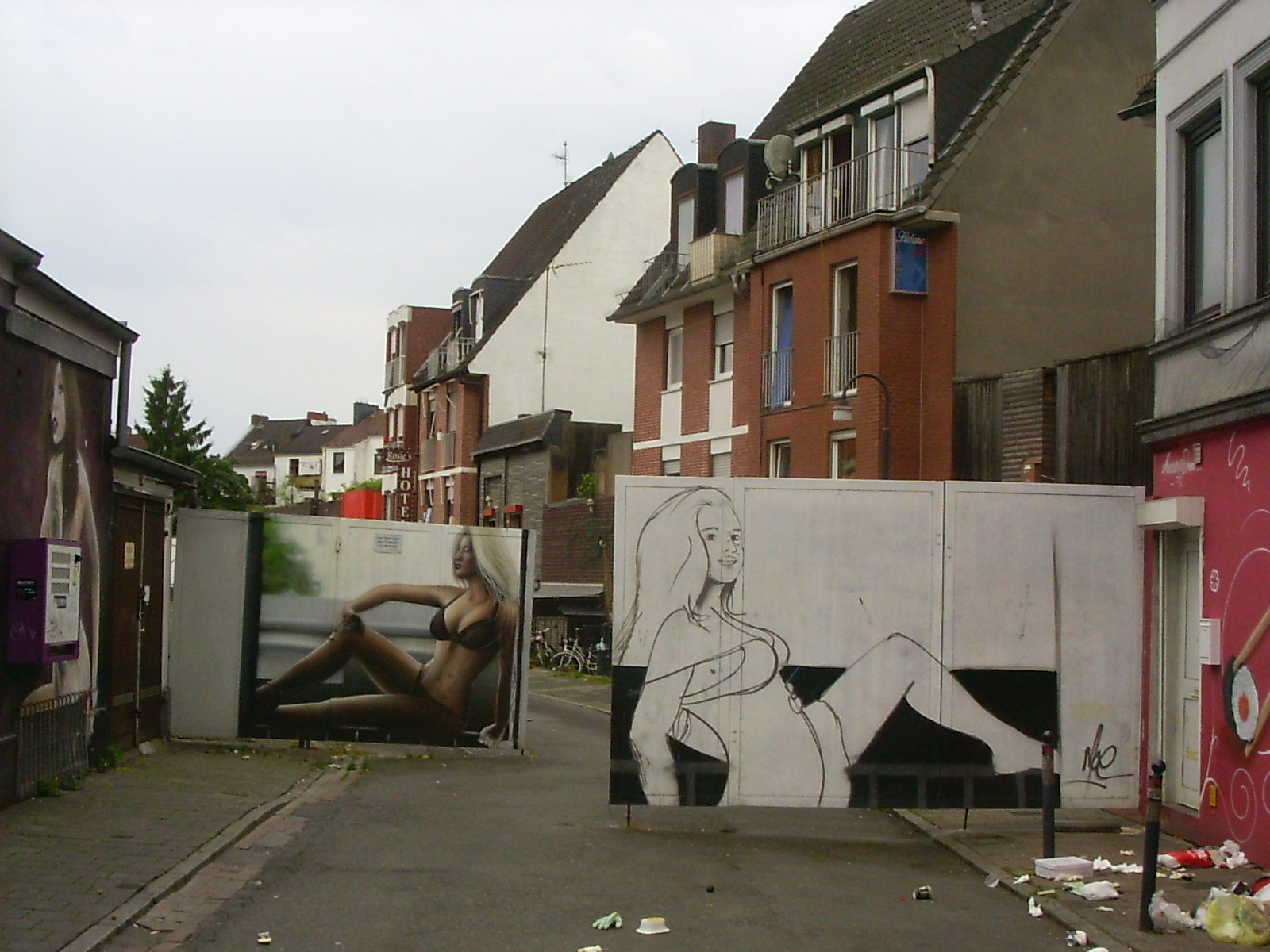
Entrance to Helenenstraße in 2014

Around a hundred women worked in Helenenstraße at its peak, but had fallen to only about half the number by 2002. Some of the premises were empty, and were rented out as homes for single men. With the expansion of the EU in 2004 and 2007, many Eastern European prostitutes came to Germany, including to Bremen. By 2011 most of the prostitutes in Helenenstraße were from Bulgaria and Romania.

There have been several proposals to redevelop the Helenenstraße since the beginning of the 21st century. The advisory board of the Eastern Suburb has opposed converting the red-light district. In the view of the advisory board, to open up the street would cause prostitution to move onto the streets and private homes. This would make police surveillance more difficult and promote human trafficking and pimping.

In 2019 the entrance to the street was revamped. The original wall across the end was demolished and the wooden gates removed. A new metal privacy screen was erected and a urinal and cycle racks provided.

== Bibliography ==
- Debinska, Barbara (17 November 2011). "Die Helenenstraße heute und morgen" [Helenenstrasse today and tomorrow]. WESER-KURIER (in German).
- Flexner, Abraham (1914). Prostitution in Europe. Grant Richards Limited.
- Holthaus, Matthias (1 September 2019). "Helenenstraße öffnet sich". WESER-KURIER (in German). Helenenstrasse opens.
- Reagin, Nancy R. (2000). A German Women's Movement: Class and Gender in Hanover, 1880-1933. Univ of North Carolina Press. ISBN 978-0-8078-6401-2.
- Roos, Julia (2010). Weimar Through the Lens of Gender: Prostitution Reform, Woman's Emancipation, and German Democracy, 1919-33. University of Michigan Press. pp. 20–21. ISBN 978-0-472-11734-5.
- Schöneberg, Kai (27 April 2002). "Von "Controlldirnen" bis zum Sex-Ghetto" [From “maids of control” to the sex ghetto]. Die Tageszeitung: taz (in German). p. 26.
- International Record of Medicine and General Practice Clinics. MD Publications. 1912.
