= Rue Princesse =

Street in Abidjan, Ivory Coast

- Entertainment district
- Abidjan: Yopougon

The Rue Princesse street is an area located in Yopougon, North Abidjan in Côte d'Ivoire. Because of its wide variety of Maquis (open-pubs), bars, nightclubs and typical African restaurants mainly offering local dishes, this street has become one of the most famous places of celebration in Abidjan. Due to its strong musical and nightlife identity, it is considered the inspirational root for many Coupé Décalé artists. However, it is notoriously known as a prominent Red Light District with a high ratio of prostitutes.

International artists such as Singuila and Didier Drogba have visited the "Rue Princesse" street.

In 2011, the president of Côte d'Ivoire, Alassane Ouattara launched a great campaign for the cleanliness of this street.
