= Sidi Abdallah Guech =

Legal red light district in Tunis

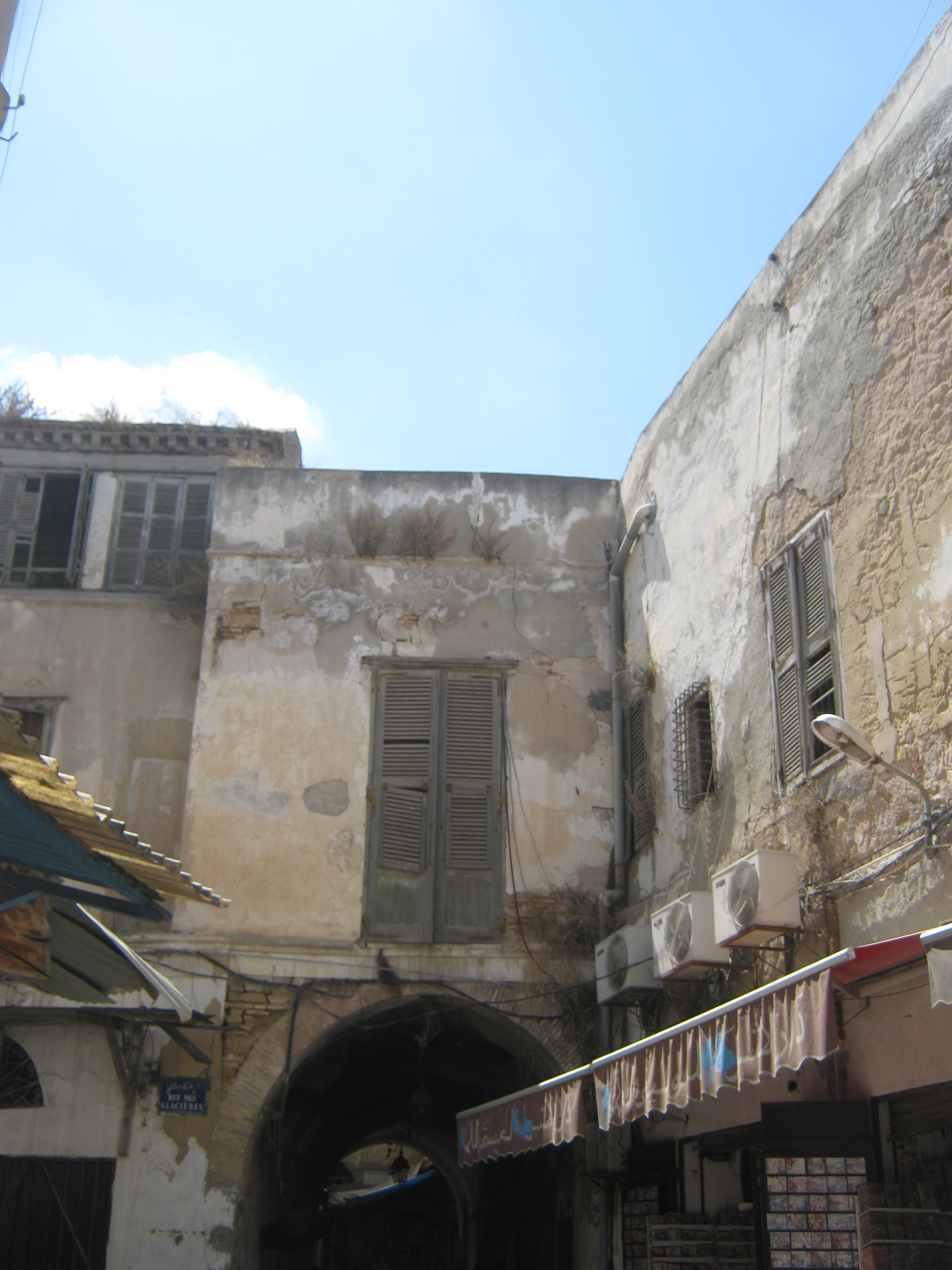
- Entrance in Rue Zarkoun, July 2014

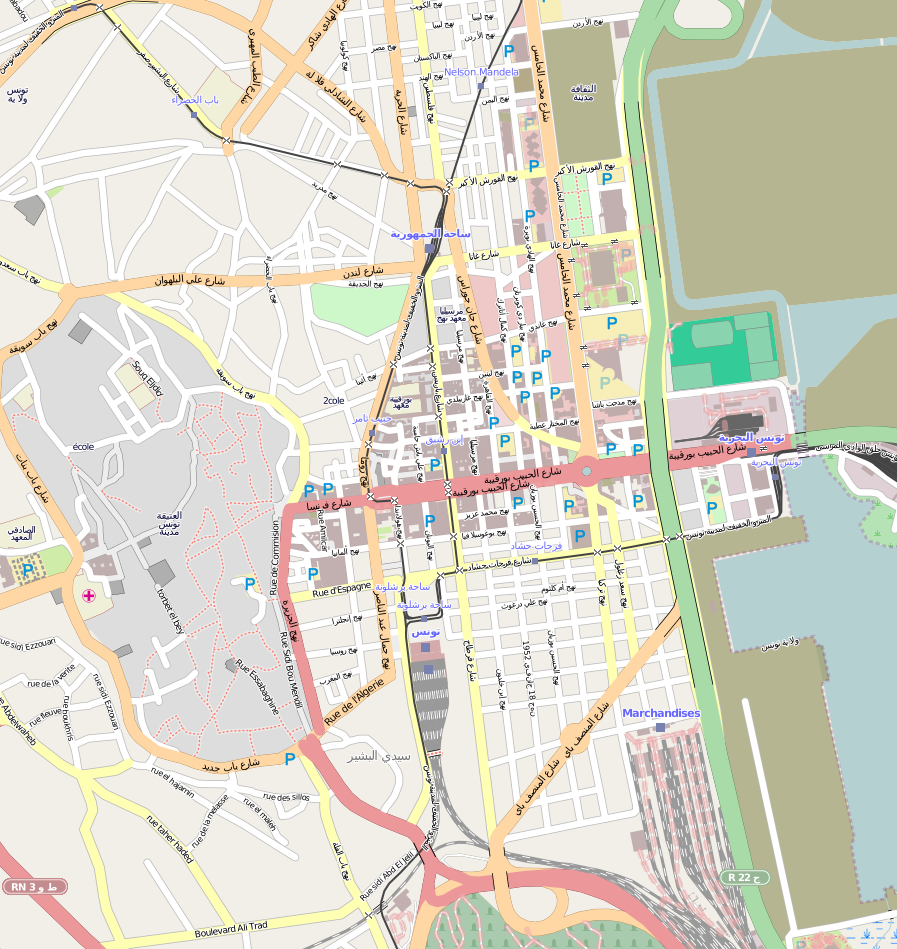
- Location within Tunis
- Native name: زنقة سيدي عبد الله قش (Arabic)
- Length: 50 m (160 ft)
- Location: Tunis, Tunisia
- Coordinates: 36.8005951°N 10.1735688°E

Other
- Known for: Brothels

Sidi Abdallah Guech street, officially known as "Impasse Sidi Abdallah Gueche" (Arabic: زنقة سيدي عبد الله قش), is the legal red light district in Tunis. It is located in the medina and consists of three narrow winding alleys. There are rooms on both sides of the alleys where women try to attract clients. Only men (apart from the women who work there) are allowed in the alleys.

== Location ==
The dead end alley is located at the entrance to the Medina, a few hundred meters from the Al-Zaytuna Mosque and the souks. This narrow and discreet alley – fifty meters long and in some places only one meter wide – hardly differs from the surrounding lanes. It is located between the old Jewish quarter, the Hara, and the French quarter.

On both sides of the alley there are small rooms in front of which the women wait for their customers.

== History ==
Tolerated and then recognised by the authorities in 1942, the alley was mainly frequented by Tunisians, Muslims or Jews during the French protectorate. The women who worked there often come from underprivileged backgrounds, their clients also being for the most part poor men, many coming from Algeria. For decades, this street was the only place where Jewish prostitutes could work.

In 1942 the Tunisian Government legalised prostitutes as "fonctionnaires" (civil servants). They were required to register and strictly regulated. One of the regulations was that they could only operate from designated areas. Sidi Abdallah Guech was the area designated in Tunis. The nature of this area has continued until current times.

=== Jasmine Revolution ===
Following the 2011 Jasmine Revolution, the Islamist government turned a blind eye to fundamentalist action against the red light districts. Many were burnt down, and in others the prostitutes were turned out and the buildings wrecked.

On 18 February 2011 a large group of fundamentalists – estimates vary between less than 100 and nearly 2,000 – approached the entrance of Sidi Abdallah Guech loudly demanding moral cleanliness. They were armed with sticks and torches. Locals barricaded the entrance to the alleys until police and military arrived. Police fired warning shots into the air to disperse the rioters. This event came within the framework of a campaign led by Salafists who demanded the closure of red-light districts and lead to the closure of the red-light districts in Béja, Kairouan, Médenine, Sfax and Sousse.

Since then the street sign has been removed and a notice put up "Closed on Fridays and during Ramadan" to try and appease the fundamentalists.

== Status ==
Prostitution practised in this authorised location, supervised by the State, is not an offence. As a result, the prostitutes of Sidi Abdallah Guech, who have the status of civil servants, are placed under the control of the services of the Ministry of Public Health and pay taxes. In 2011, a total of 238 prostitutes were registered of which nearly 50 visited the local health centre daily.

== Literature ==
Sidi Abdallah Guech is mentioned by several authors of Tunisian literature. Būrāwī Ṭarābulusī mentions the alley several times in Thunis Thanatos. Abdelmajid Bouslama, in Les portes du Menzel, described it as a place of initiation for the young narrator given that extramarital relationships are very frowned upon by society. Tahar Fazaa includes it in Chroniques hebdo as part of the history of prostitution in Tunisia, pointing out that Jewish prostitutes were located there.
