= Clinton Plaza =

Nightlife district in Bangkok, Thailand

Coordinates: 13.7392°N 100.5577°E

Clinton Plaza was a thriving but short-lived nightlife district in Bangkok, Thailand, on Sukhumvit Road between Soi 13 and Soi 15. Its location was excellent, being midway between the Nana Entertainment Plaza to the west and the Soi Cowboy nightlife area to the east.

The plaza, the brainchild of a Dutchman and an American, but then in 1999 was taken over by a New Zealand entrepreneur, began as a collection of beer bars in 1998. The following year it was named after then U.S. President Bill Clinton. A number of lively go-go bars appeared in 2000. Many of the names were tongue in cheek jabs at the president, including Monica Beer Bar, Bill's Coffee House and the White House.

In 2001 the Interior Minister of Thailand, Purachai Piumsombun, began a campaign to enforce his ideas of social order. A 01:00 closing hour for all bars and nightclubs was enforced and employment of nude dancers was discouraged. The shortened hours, combined with contractual disputes related to redevelopment plans, led to the complete shut down of the bar area by May 2003. The existing structures were razed and a hotel has since been built on the location.

The Clinton Plaza bars Checkpoint Charlie and Hollywood-a-Go-Go appear in Jordan Clark's 2005 documentary Falang: Behind Bangkok's Smile which takes a critical view of sex tourism in Thailand.
