= Bandar Baru =

Village in Indonesia

Coordinates: 3.2670°N 98.5150°E

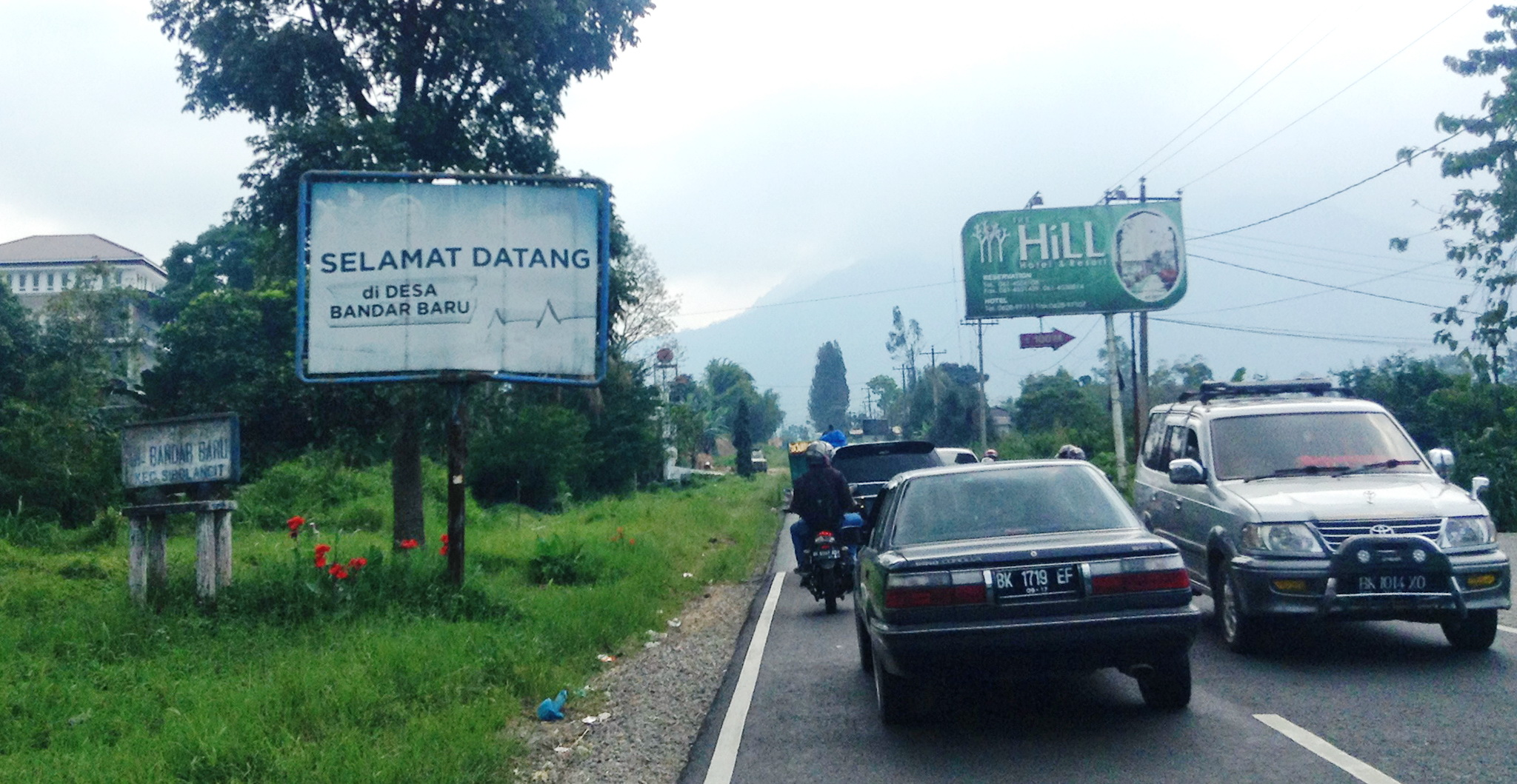
Welcome Gate to Bandar Baru, Sibolangit, Deli Serdang

Bandar Baru (known locally as 'BB') is a village in Deli Serdang Regency, North Sumatra, on the road from Medan to Berastagi in Indonesia. It is located in Sibolangit subdistrict by the Bukit Lawang river, near Sibolangit and Karo Regency. The village has many cafes, restaurants, and shops. It is also a lokalisasi (government-licensed prostitution area)

In 1904, a battle occurred in the village between local Karo people and colonial soldiers sent to "pacify the unruly highlanders."

== Prostitution ==
Much of the prostitution in Bandar Baru is based in cafes, where sex workers act as hostesses. They may accompany customers and offer sexual services away from the café. Sex workers may also receive commissions from the sale of drinks to their clients.

Some of the bungalows built for tourists have been turned into brothels.

=== Sex trafficking ===
As with other lokalisasi in Indonesia, sex trafficking, particularly of underage girls, is a significant problem.

Due to its bad reputation and issues associated with prostitution, the status of BB as a lokalisasi is being reviewed by the Deli Serdang government.
