= Vulkanstraße =

Street in Duisburg, Germany

Street in Duisburg, Germany
- Interactive map of Vulkanstraße
- Location: Duisburg, North Rhine-Westphalia, Germany
- Coordinates: 51.430963°N 6.752358°E

Other
- Known for: Prostitution

The Vulkanstraße (German pronunciation: [vʊlˈkaːnʃtʁaːsə], lit. 'Volcano Street') is a street in Duisburg, Germany that is the location of the city's red-light district. There are a number of brothels in the street including Laufhaus. It is the largest red-light district in the state of North Rhine-Westphalia.

The brothels in Vulkanstraße had a total of 432 rooms in mid-2013. According to an estimate by the Express, the operators generate a seven-digit profit per month.

On October 31, 2009 there were massive clashes between the Bandidos and the Hells Angels in Vulkanstraße. The local police had to call in the Bereitschaftspolizei (riot police) for reinforcements. While the Bandidos controlled the Ruhr area, the Hells Angels claimed the Rhineland for themselves; interests overlap in Duisburg. Other competitors included the Satudarah.

In 2011 there were plans to move the red-light district to Duisburg, but there was strong opposition. The Vulkanstraße could not be closed without providing an alternate venue. "This would amount to a professional ban and would not be accepted by the courts," according to the city administration. Later in the same year the construction of another brothel on the Vulkanstraße was approved by the District Council.

Legal disputes began in 2012 over the "brothel tax" introduced by Duisburg. The city's revenue from the tax was estimated to be 500,000 euros.

In 2013, the Greens and leftists in the Duisburg city council called for an advice centre for prostitutes. The "Lily" advice centre was set up in 2015. In their annual report in 2016, Lily reported that 500 women worked as prostitutes and the area, in 10 brothels with 440 rooms. They also reported a high proportion of STIs amongst the women.

== See also ==
- Prostitution in Germany
