= Punkendeich =

Dike and former place of prostitution in Bremen, Germany

- Stadtteil of Bremen
- Interactive map of Punkendeich
- Location within Germany Location within Bremen
- Coordinates: 53.07108°N 8.81308°E
- Country: Germany
- State: Bremen
- City: Bremen
- Time zone: UTC+01:00 (CET)
  - Summer (DST): UTC+02:00 (CEST)

The Punkendeich was a dike (floodbank) between the river Weser and the city of Bremen that was known for prostitution. It ran from the city wall (Altenwall) to Sielwall (today's Deichstraße to Siel am Dobben). Originally called the Sieldeich, the Punkendeich was incorporated into the larger Osterdeich in 1850. A road and houses were built along the top of the dike, the road later becoming part of the Osterdeich trunk road.

== Etymology ==
Punke is an obsolete German word for prostitute that was used in Bremen and the surrounding areas.

The name probably dates from the Seven Years' War (1756–1763), when the soldiers' prostitutes - the so-called Punken - were not tolerated within Bremen itself and set up on the dike outside the city wall.

An alternative origin was proposed by Harro Koebnick of the Hal över ferry company. In Low German the words for barge and prostitute are similar, and that Punkendeich takes its name not from the prostitutes but the barges that ran from the dike as a ferry across the river.

== Ferry ==
A ferry across Weser river used to run from the Punkendeich. Later it ran from the nearby Sielwall. The Bremen passenger shipping company Hal över, which operates the ferry across the Weser, christened one of its passenger ships the "Punke" in 1990 as a memory of the Punkendeich and the prostitutes that frequented it.

== Bremer Eiswette ==
Every year on 6 January, the Bremer Eiswette (Bremen Ice Bet), a local folk festival whose history dates back to 1829, takes place on the former Punkendeich. The custom originated in the winter of 1828, 18 Bremen merchants had a bet as to whether the Weser would be ice-free on Epiphany (6 January). The sooner the ice cleared enough to allow the passage of ships, the sooner the merchants could earn money again. A "skinny little tailor" had to cross the river carrying a glowing iron as a test of the river being completely iced-over. The losers of the bet would have to pay for a meal for all concerned on 17 January.

Originally the meal was one of cabbage, but today is a banquet for 700 including guests of honour. Most of the previous German Presidents and Chancellors have been guests of honour at the meal. A collection during the meal goes to the German Society for the Rescue of Castaway (DGzRS), who have a rescue boat on hand to assist the tailor crossing the river during the ice bet. In recent years the collection has exceeded 400,000 euros. The meal was traditionally only for men. Although public opinion wanted women to be allowed to attend the meal in 2013, this was resisted. Following pressure from the Senate, women attended in 2020.

The current format of the celebrations dates back to 1928 when the centenary of the ice bet was being planned. The tailor, who has a pointed beard and is dressed in an old tailcoat, must weigh 99 pounds. The "President of the Ice Bet", assisted by Novices and Pages, oversees proceedings, and the Notarius publicus, complete with legal wig, ensures fair play. The Medicus publicus is carried by the Three wise Men to check that the tailor's iron is hot. (In Western Christianity tradition, Epiphany is the time of the visit of the Magi). At 12 noon, the tailor attempts the crossing.

The Weser hasn't been completely frozen over since 1946.
