= Jagalmadang =

Former red-light district in South Korea

- Coordinates: 35.8767401°N 128.5780215°E
- Country: South Korea
- City: Daegu
- District: Jung District
- Dong: Seongnae-dong

Korean name
- Hangul: 자갈마당
- Revised Romanization: Jagalmadang
- McCune–Reischauer: Chagalmadang

Jagalmadang (Korean: 자갈마당) is a former red-light district located in Seongnae-dong, Jung District, Daegu, South Korea. Sex work was conducted in the area from the 1900s to around 2021.

The area first received this reputation during the early 1900s, during the Japanese colonial period. Sex work in the area declined beginning in the 2000s, due to legislation and the rise of online and phone scheduling for sex. By the 2010s, the city government made significant efforts to demolish the buildings formerly used for prostitution. Their plans went through and the district was demolished by 2021. However, some have questioned whether this would genuinely contribute to the end of sex work in the area and if it would improve safety for sex workers.

== History ==
It first emerged in the 1900s in the early Japanese colonial period. The name of the district, meaning literally "gravel yard", is said to come from gravel that was laid out to create noise if someone walked on it, which would alert the Japanese if a forced prostitute was trying to escape.

Until 2004, around 62 brothels were operating in Jagalmadang, which employed around 350 prostitutes. However, following the passage of a special law against prostitution in 2004, many of these were forced to close. In addition, the rise of the internet and popularization of phones led to prostitution being arranged and practiced in more discrete locations, rather than in centralized districts. Despite this, prostitution continued to occur in the area, although the number of prostitutes dwindled to fewer than 100 by 2018. The area has been developed a number of times, with transportation to it improved, which has diminished the prominence of prostitution in the area. People who live nearby also frequently filed complaints about it, which increased government attention on the issue.

By 2018, Daegu announced plans to renovate much of the area, with plans to construct shopping malls and a park. However, they had difficulty finding investors who were willing to fund the project. Committed to ending the prostitution in the district, the government then announced that if private investment failed to meet their needs, public funds would fund the remainder of the development. The goal was to begin demolition by 2021. The plans went ahead, and by November 2021 it was reported that much of the area had been demolished.

== Debate ==
While many supported the plans to demolish the area, some questioned the effectiveness of them. As modern prostitution is often arranged online, making it more decentralized could make conditions more dangerous for prostitutes, without putting an end to the practice. One journalist writing for News and View advocated for the legalization and regulation of prostitution, similar to how the Netherlands handles the issue.

There has also been a conflict over how much aid should be provided to current and former prostitutes. Some politicians advocated for a reduction in aid, as they viewed prostitutes as criminals, while others sought to rehabilitate and assist them in leaving the profession. But by 2016, a plan went forward to not persecute former prostitutes, with money allocated to assist them with obtaining new housing and seek mental health counseling.
