= Prostitution in Europe =

Abolitionism – Prostitution legal and unregulated, excluding organized activities such as brothels and pimping. Neo-abolitionism – Illegal to buy sex and for 3rd party involvement, legal to sell sex Decriminalization – No criminal penalties for prostitution Legalization – Prostitution legal and regulated Prohibitionism – Prostitution illegal Legality varies with local laws

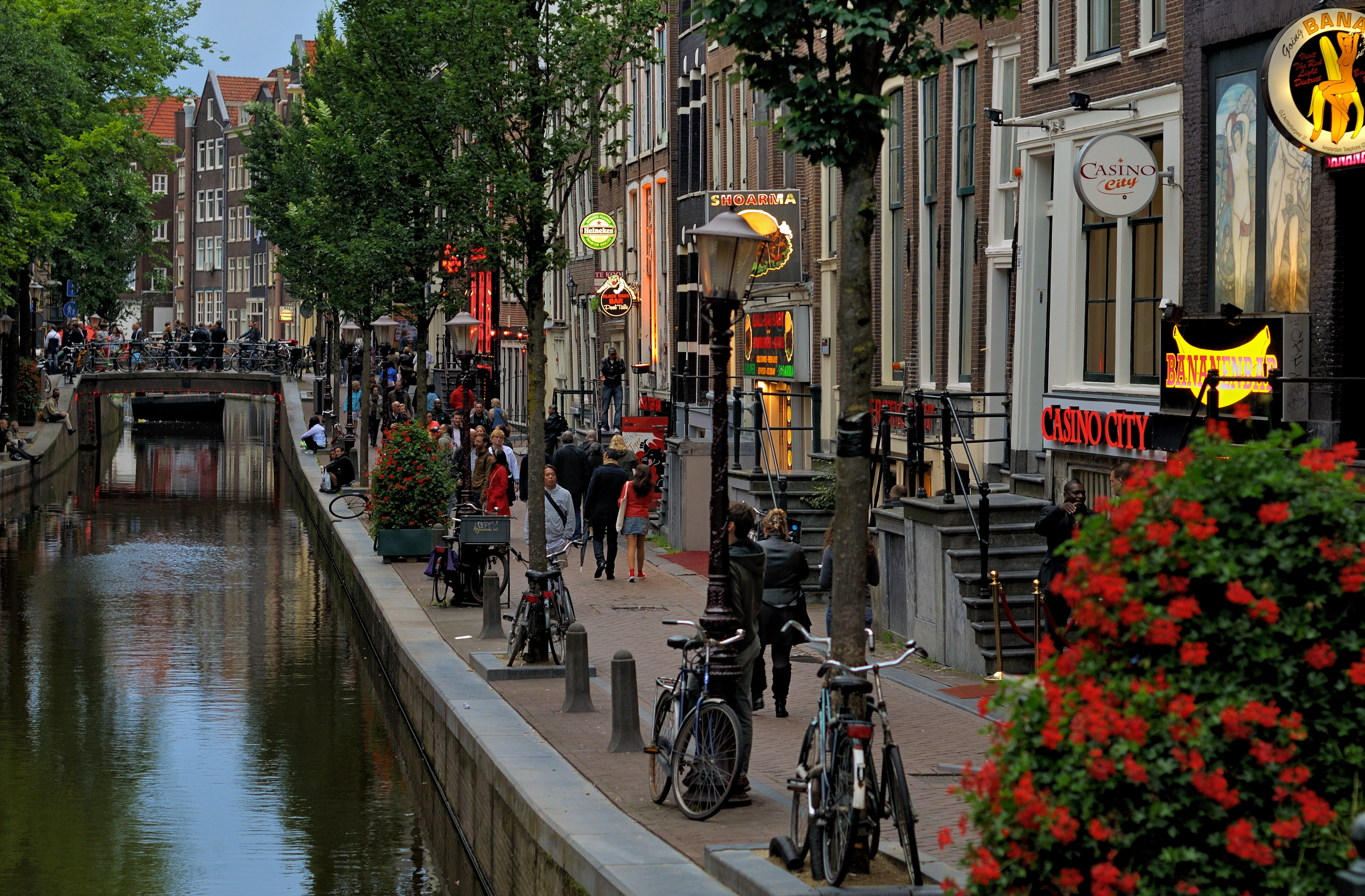
De Wallen, Amsterdam's red-light district, offers activities such as legal prostitution and a number of coffee shops that sell marijuana. It is one of the main tourist attractions.

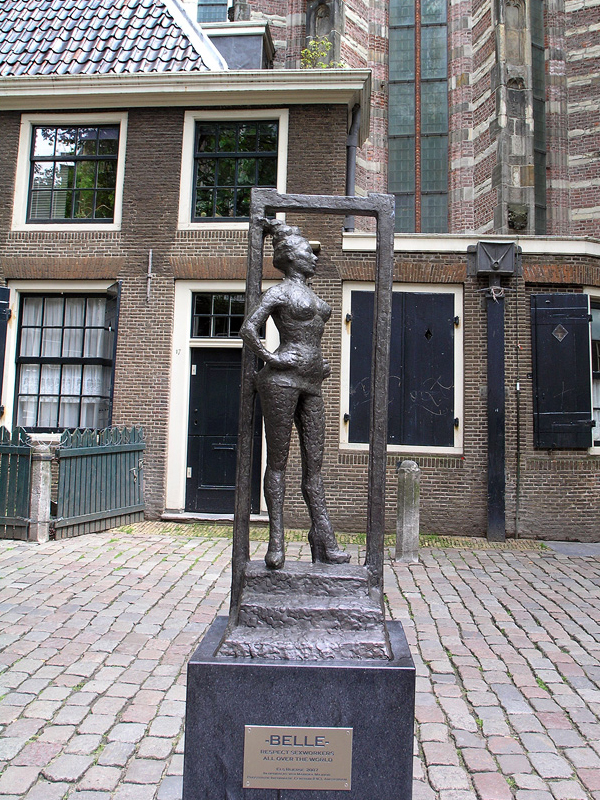
Bronze statue Belle in front of the Oude Kerk by Els Rijerse. The inscription reads: "Respect sex workers all over the world."

The legality of prostitution in Europe varies by country.

Some countries outlaw the act of engaging in sexual activity in exchange for money, while others allow prostitution itself, but not most forms of procuring (such as operating brothels, facilitating the prostitution of another, deriving financial gain from the prostitution of another, soliciting/loitering).

In 10 European countries (Belgium, Germany, Netherlands, Austria, Switzerland, Luxembourg, Greece, Hungary, Latvia, and Turkey), prostitution is legal and regulated.

Belgium became the first country in Europe to decriminalize sex work as of 1 June 2022.

The degree of enforcement of the anti-prostitution laws varies by country, by region, and by city. In many places, there is a big discrepancy between the laws which exist on the books and what happens in practice.

Depending on the country, various prostitution-related activities may be prohibited (where a specific law forbids such activity), decriminalized (where there is no specific law either forbidding or allowing and regulating the activity), or regulated (where a specific law explicitly allows and regulates the activity if certain conditions are met). Activities which are subject to the prostitution laws include: selling and buying sexual services, soliciting in public places, running brothels, deriving financial gain from the prostitution of another, offering premises to be used for prostitution etc. Often, the prostitution laws are not clear-cut, and are subject to interpretation, leading to many legal loopholes. While the policy regarding adult prostitution differs by country, child prostitution is illegal throughout Europe. Similarly, human trafficking, forced prostitution, and other abusive activities are also prohibited.

The legal and social treatment of prostitution differs widely by country. Very permissive prostitution policies exist in the Netherlands and Germany, and these countries are major destinations for international sex tourism. Amsterdam's prostitution windows are famous all over the world. In Sweden, Norway, Iceland, Northern Ireland, France and Ireland, it is illegal to pay for sex, but not to be a prostitute (the client commits a crime, but not the prostitute). Other countries which have restrictive prostitution policies and officially affirm an anti-prostitution stance are Great Britain, Denmark and Finland. In countries such as Spain, Italy, and the Czech Republic, attitudes are more laissez-faire and tolerant, but prostitution is not officially recognized as a job, and not officially and legally regulated, and pimping is forbidden.

== Central-Eastern Europe ==
=== Armenia ===
Armenia
- Prostitution illegal Buying sex legal

Prostitution in Armenia is illegal under administrative law (Article 179.1). Related activities such as running a brothel and pimping are prohibited by the Criminal Code, although there are known to be brothels in the capital, Yerevan, and in Gyumri. According to UNESCO, since the collapse of the Soviet Union in 1991, prostitution in the country has grown. There are about 5,600 women involved in prostitution in Armenia, roughly 1,500 of them are in Yerevan. However, official police figures are far lower, for example 240 in 2012. Police and other safety forces reportedly tolerate prostitution. Many women turn to prostitution due to unemployment.

=== Azerbaijan ===
Azerbaijan
- Prostitution illegal Buying sex legal

Prostitution in Azerbaijan is illegal but common. Prostitution is an administrative offence and punishable by a fine. Keeping a brothel is a criminal offence and punishable by up to 6 years imprisonment. In 2017 a draft law proposing to add heavy fines to the punishment for keeping a brothel was before the National Assembly. It has been estimated that there are 25,054 prostitutes in Azerbaijan, some of which are aged 15 – 18.

=== Belarus ===
Belarus
- Prostitution illegal Buying sex legal

Prostitution is illegal in Belarus but commonplace and is an administrative, rather than criminal, offence. Running a brothel is forbidden and engaging in other means of pimping are punishable by up to 10 years in prison. UNAIDS estimated there were 22,000 sex workers in Belarus in 2016.

=== Bulgaria ===
Bulgaria
- Prostitution legal Buying sex legal Brothels illegal Procuring illegal

Prostitution itself is legal, but organised prostitution (brothels, prostitution rings, or other forms of procuring) is prohibited. Because of poor socioeconomic conditions, a high number of Romani women are involved in prostitution.

Bulgaria originally gained a reputation as a transit country for human trafficking, but subsequently, it has become known as a destination where the sex trade takes place.

The Bulgarian government has stepped up its efforts to eradicate human trafficking. The sex trade is a major source of income for Bulgarian criminals. In 2013 there were 20,000 Bulgarian prostitutes working abroad and this was a source of foreign exchange earnings for Bulgaria. In the past, the Bulgarian government considered fully legalizing and regulating prostitution.

=== Czech Republic ===
Czech Republic
- Prostitution legal Buying sex legal Brothels illegal Procuring illegal Solicitation illegal

In the Czech Republic, prostitution is legal, but brothels and other forms of procuring are prohibited. The enforcement of these laws is lax, and prostitution and other activities which surround it are very common in the country.

Ever since the Velvet Revolution in Czechoslovakia in 1989 led to the creation of the two independent states Czech Republic and Slovakia, prostitution has been flourishing, and has contributed its share to the region's booming tourist economy. It is widespread in Prague and areas near the Republic's borders with Germany and Austria. In 2002, the Czech Statistical Bureau estimated the trade to be worth six billion Czech koruna ($217 million) a year.

=== Georgia ===
Georgia (country)
- Prostitution illegal Buying sex legal

In Georgia, prostitution is illegal but widespread, particularly in the capital, Tbilisi. Many NGO's attribute this to the harsh economic conditions according to the US State Department. Prostitution occurs on the streets, in bars, nightclubs, hotels and brothels. UNAIDS estimate there are 6,525 prostitutes in Georgia.

The Black Sea resorts, especially Gonio, become a sex tourism destination in the summer months. many prostitutes, mainly Central Asian and from the North Caucasus come to the area. Due to the close proximity of the Turkish border, and no visa requirements for Turks, many men from Turkey come to the area to find prostitutes.

=== Hungary ===
Hungary
- Prostitution legal and regulated Buying sex legal Brothels illegal Procuring illegal

Prostitution is legal and regulated in Hungary. (It has been legalized and regulated by the government since 1999.) Under the law, prostitutes are professionals who engage in sexual activities in exchange for money. The government allows this activity as long as they pay taxes and keep legal documents.

In 2007, the prostitution and pornography industry in Hungary was estimated by Hungary's tax authority APEH to generate $1 billion annually.

=== Kazakhstan ===
Kazakhstan
- Prostitution legal Buying sex legal Brothels illegal Procuring illegal Solicitation illegal

In Kazakhstan prostitution itself is legal, but acts facilitating prostitution, such as operating a brothel or prostitution ring, are illegal. Forced prostitution and prostitution connected to organized crime are prohibited. NGOs reported that criminal prostitution rings often included local law enforcement officials.

Estimates of the number of prostitutes in Kazakhstan vary from 4,000 and 25.000, including a number from Kyrgyzstan, Uzbekistan and Ukraine.

Sex workers often face harassment, extortion, arbitrary arrest, rape and violence from the police.

=== Moldova ===
Moldova
- Prostitution illegal Buying sex legal

Prostitution in Moldova is an illegal activity but is widespread and socially acceptable.

Morals Police captain Vladimir Istrati is quoted as saying "Prostitution in Moldova is a very well organised crime, there is a precise structure of operation which includes secretary, office, and owner." The secretary is hard to file evidence against because they are most likely to conceal their true activity behind offering exotic services over the phone. Nailing down prostitutes and pimps is easier."

=== Poland ===
Poland
- Prostitution legal Buying sex legal Brothels illegal Procuring illegal Solicitation illegal

In Poland prostitution is legal, but operating brothels or other forms of pimping or coercive prostitution and prostitution of minors are prohibited, as is living off someone else's prostitution.

Prostitution is present in various forms in the country and a 2007 US State Department report stated that many women who worked as prostitutes were employed in massage parlors and escort services that functioned as brothels, although technically illegal. Prostitution is the only profession in Poland that is not taxed, but sex workers may be asked by authorities to prove that is what they do, since prostitution is not recognized as legitimate work, and therefore receive no social benefits.

=== Romania ===
Romania
- Prostitution legal Buying sex legal Brothels illegal Procuring illegal Solicitation illegal

Prostitution in Romania is not itself criminalized, although associated activities, such as procuring, are criminal offenses, and solicitation is a contravention punishable by fines.

Solicitation is an administrative offence (contravenție) punishable by a fine of 500–1500 lei (approximately 110–330 euros as of 2016). The National Police, Local Police and Gendarmes are all responsible for enforcing the laws, although there are reports that law enforcement is corrupt and that police are often violent.

Clients are not prosecuted, unless they knowingly use the services of a victim of forced prostitution, or the prostitute is a minor (Art. 2161).

Article 213 criminalizes procuring; it states that "The causing or facilitation of the practice of prostitution or the obtaining of financial benefits from the practice of prostitution by one or more individuals shall be punishable by no less than 2 and no more than 7 years of imprisonment and a ban on the exercise of certain rights." In certain aggravated circumstances, the punishment increases. The penal code also criminalizes several offenses against slavery, human trafficking, child trafficking, forced labour, and using exploited persons (Art. 182 Exploitation of a person, Art. 209 Slavery, Art. 210 Trafficking in human beings, Art. 211 Trafficking in underage persons, Art. 212 Pressing into forced or compulsory labor, Art. 216 Use of an exploited person's services).

=== Russia ===
Russia
- Prostitution illegal Buying sex legal

Prostitution is an administrative, but not criminal, offence in Russia (such as, for example, drinking beer in a public place or walking nude on the street). The maximum punishment is a fine up to 2000 rubles (~$30); however, organising prostitution or engaging somebody into prostitution is punishable by a prison term.

=== Slovakia ===
Slovakia
- Prostitution legal Buying sex legal Brothels illegal Procuring illegal Solicitation illegal

Prostitution itself is legal, but operating brothels and other activities related to prostitution are prohibited. Public order offences are used against women who work on the streets.

=== Ukraine ===
Ukraine
- Prostitution illegal Buying sex legal

Prostitution is illegal in Ukraine, but is nevertheless widespread and largely ignored by the government. Laws criminalizing organised prostitution and penalties for human trafficking have had little effect because many convicted traffickers often do not end up serving prison time. The economic decline in Ukraine made the nation vulnerable and forced many to depend on prostitution and trafficking as a source of income. Sex tourism rose as the country attracted greater numbers of foreign tourists.

== Northern Europe ==
=== Denmark ===
Denmark
- Prostitution legal Buying sex legal Brothels illegal Procuring illegal

In Denmark, prostitution was partly decriminalized in 1999, based partly on the premise that it was easier to police a legal trade than an illegal one. Third-party activities, such as profiting from brothel administration and other forms of procuring, remain illegal activities in Denmark, as do pimping and prostitution of minors.

==== Faroe Islands ====
Under Danish Jurisdiction, the legal status of prostitution remains lawful. However, there is no evidence of organised prostitution within the self-governing territory.

=== Estonia ===
Estonia
- Prostitution legal Buying sex legal Brothels illegal Procuring illegal

Prostitution in Estonia is legal in itself, but organized prostitution is illegal. Since prostitution is a sensitive indicator that develops with changes in the social environment and the state, it is useful to divide the history of this phenomenon from Estonia's first independence according to the different historical stages of the country.

Firstly, the period of Estonian independence 1918–1940, when the prostitution in Estonia was legalized. Secondly, the period of the Soviet occupation when prostitution was criminalized. Thirdly, since Estonian new independence when prostitution is neither criminalized nor legalized (that is, the selling of and buying of a sexual service is not a crime but prostitution is not considered a profession either).

=== Finland ===
Finland
- Prostitution legal Buying sex legal Brothels illegal Procuring illegal Solicitation illegal

Prostitution itself is legal in Finland (soliciting in a public place is illegal), but organised prostitution, operating a brothel or a prostitution ring, and other forms of pimping) is illegal. In June 2006, parliament voted by 158 to 15 with four abstentions to approve a bill which outlaws the buying of sexual services from prostitutes if it is linked to human trafficking. According to a recent TAMPEP study, 69% of prostitutes are foreigners. As of 2009, there was little "visible" prostitution in Finland, as it was mostly limited to private residences and nightclubs in larger metropolitan areas.

=== Iceland ===
Iceland
- Prostitution legal Buying sex illegal Brothels illegal Procuring illegal Solicitation legal

Paying for sex is illegal in Iceland (the client commits a crime, but the prostitute does not). The police have stated that they do not have the resources to enforce the law. Consequently, a vigilante group called "Stóra systir" ("Big Sister") has been formed.

A report published in 2017 by the National Commissioner of the Icelandic Police states that prostitution had "exploded" in the previous 18 months. The vast majority of prostitutes in the country are foreign. Police believe prostitution in Iceland is partially tied to organised crime and human trafficking.

The country has become a sex tourism destination.

=== Ireland ===
Ireland
- Prostitution legal Buying sex illegal Brothels illegal Procuring illegal Solicitation legal

Prostitution itself is legal in Ireland, however since March 2017, it has been an offence to buy sex. Third party involvement such as operating brothels, and other forms of pimping, are also illegal. Although the 2017 law criminalising clients was designed to reduce the demand for prostitution, the law has had little effect.

Most prostitution in Ireland occurs indoors and is advertised via the internet. Street prostitution has declined considerably.

=== Latvia ===
Latvia
- Prostitution legal and regulated Buying sex legal Brothels illegal Procuring illegal Solicitation illegal

Prostitution is legal and regulated in Latvia. Prostitutes must register, must undergo monthly health checks, and must carry a health card; if they fail to do so, they can be penalized. Although prostitution is regulated in Latvia, brothels and other forms of procuring are illegal. According to the law, "Any activity of the third person which promotes prostitution is prohibited", and, "Persons are prohibited to join in groups in order to offer and provide sexual services".

=== Lithuania ===
Lithuania
- Prostitution illegal Buying sex illegal

Prostitution in Lithuania is illegal, but it is common. Law enforcement is weak, corrupt and is reputedly connected to organised crime. It is estimated that there are 3,000 prostitutes in the capital Vilnius. Many of them are foreign, predominantly Russian, but there are also significant numbers from Belarus, Ukraine and Poland. Street prostitution, including underage prostitutes, is generally controlled by criminal elements.

=== Norway ===
Norway
- Prostitution legal Buying sex illegal Brothels illegal Procuring illegal Solicitation illegal

Paying for sex is illegal (the client commits a crime, but the prostitute does not). This law prohibiting the buying of sexual services (sexkjøpsloven) came into effect on 1 January 2009, following the passing of new legislation by the Storting in November 2008. Soliciting and advertising "sexual services" is also illegal under the Norwegian Criminal Code (Straffeloven) section 378 and section 202(3).

In 2013, it was estimated there were 3,000 sex workers working in Norway (population 5 million). Earnings from sex trade are estimated at 390 million kroner (£39m, $US63m, €48m).

=== Sweden ===
Sweden
- Prostitution legal Buying sex illegal Brothels illegal Procuring illegal Solicitation legal

Paying for sex is illegal (the client commits a crime, but not the prostitute). The Sex Purchase Act (Not an act of its own, but rather an amendment to the criminal code, commonly knows as Sexköpslagen), which makes it illegal to pay for sex, but not to be a prostitute, was adopted in 1999, and was then unique. Since then, similar laws have been passed in Norway and Iceland.

The rationale underpinning the law was the view that prostitution was a form of violence against women so the crime consists in the customer paying for sex, not in the prostitute selling sexual services. This 'rationale' sees the seller of sex as the exploited partner in the exchange.

=== United Kingdom ===
United Kingdom
- Prostitution legal Buying sex legal (except in Northern Ireland); Brothels illegal Procuring illegal Solicitation illegal

In Great Britain, prostitution itself is legal, but a number of related activities, including soliciting in a public place, kerb crawling, keeping a brothel, pimping, and pandering, are outlawed.

The Policing and Crime Act 2009 makes it illegal to pay for sex with a prostitute who has been "subjected to force", and this is a strict liability offence (clients can be prosecuted even if they didn't know the prostitute was forced).

In Northern Ireland, which previously had similar laws to the rest of the United Kingdom, paying for sex became a crime when the Human Trafficking and Exploitation (Criminal Justice and Support for Victims) Act (Northern Ireland) 2015 was became law in June 2015.

==== Guernsey ====
Prostitution in Guernsey is legal, but related activities such as solicitation and brothel keeping are prohibited. At the end of the 19th century prostitution was common in Guernsey, especially in St Peter Port where around 500 soldiers were garrisoned. A large number of the prostitutes were French.

==== Isle of Man ====
Prostitution is legal in the Isle of Man but related activities such as soliciting, procuring and brothel keeping are prohibited by the Sexual Offences Act 1992.

There are few prostitutes permanently on the Isle of Man, most visiting the island on short term "tours". A man and a woman were arrested on suspicion of committing prostitution offences in Douglas in 2013. A police spokesman said this was "an unusual and rare incident."

==== Jersey ====
Prostitution in Jersey is legal, but related activities such as keeping a brothel are outlawed. Following a consultation period from 1 September 2017 and 13 October 2017, the Home Affairs Minister approved a new draft Sexual Offences (Jersey) Law to be debated in the Assembly of the States of Jersey. The draft law does not criminalise prostitution, but consolidates previous legislation on related activities.

In 2015 it was estimated there were 35–40 prostitutes in Jersey. Most visit the island for short periods and work from hotels.

== Southern Europe ==
=== Albania ===
Albania
- Prostitution illegal Buying sex legal

Prostitution in Albania is illegal but widespread.

Prior to the collapse of the Soviet Union in the early 1990s, prostitution in Albania was virtually unknown. The migration from rural areas to the cities, and economic problems that followed the collapse caused some women to turn to prostitution.

Street prostitution occurs near the centre of the capital, Tirana, mainly by Roma men and women. Some students work as prostitutes from hotels or motels in Tirana and other big cities. Brothels also found in the cities.

=== Andorra ===
Andorra
- Prostitution illegal Buying sex legal

Prostitution in Andorra is illegal.

=== Bosnia and Herzegovina ===
Bosnia and Herzegovina
- Prostitution legal Buying sex legal Brothels illegal Procuring illegal Solicitation illegal

Prostitution in Bosnia and Herzegovina is legal, but related activities such as solicitation and keeping a brothel are illegal. The law treats procuring as a major crime. Under the law, trafficking is a state-level crime that carries a sentence of up to 10 years in prison. In 2016, UNAIDS estimated there to be 4,000 prostitutes in the country.

=== Croatia ===
Croatia
- Prostitution illegal Buying sex legal

Prostitution in Croatia is illegal, but common. Forcible prostitution, any kind of brothels, or procuring are treated as felony, while voluntary prostitution is considered to be infraction against public order (for prostitutes only; clients are not in violation of law). As in other Southeast European countries, the problem of human trafficking for the purposes of sex is a concern in Croatia. However, according to the United States Department of State, Croatia was a tier 1 country as of 2011, actively working to prevent the sex trade. As of 2021 report, Croatia has been placed in tier 2 since 2013.

=== Cyprus ===
Cyprus
- Prostitution legal Buying sex legal Brothels illegal Procuring illegal

The law does not prohibit prostitution itself, but operating brothels, organizing prostitution rings, living off the profits of prostitution, encouraging prostitution or forcing a person to engage in prostitution are illegal activities.

Cyprus has been criticised by the US State Department for failing to control the flow of illegal immigrants and legal to be involved in forced prostitution. Cyprus has gained a reputation for being a major transit point for people smugglers to transport women for the purposes of prostitution. International observers have criticized the government for its lack of action to prevent forced prostitution. The law of Cyprus forbids forced (but not voluntary) prostitution. However, it is believed that many immigrants are hired as barmaids and coerced into prostitution by this method.

==== Northern Cyprus ====
Northern Cyprus
- Prostitution illegal Buying sex legal

The Turkish Republic of Northern Cyprus is only recognised as a separate state by Turkey. Prostitution is illegal, however in nightclubs, "konsomatrices", who sit with, eat with or entertain customers for money are allowed. Konsomatrices are not allowed to have sex with customers, but this restriction is frequently flouted. Enforcement is generally lax, but in July 2006 the Nicosia District Court ordered the first prostitution-related imprisonment. After pleading no contest to the charges, the manager of Mexico nightclub, Mesut Kilicarslan, was sentenced to 15 days in prison for encouraging and profiting from prostitution. By the year's end three more suspects were sentenced to imprisonment for encouraging and profiting from prostitution.

Northern Cyprus has become a destination for sex tourism.

=== Gibraltar ===
Gibraltar
- Prostitution illegal Buying sex legal

Prostitution is illegal in Gibraltar, as are related activities. Prior to its abolition in 1992 prostitution was concentrated in the red-light district of Seruya's Ramp.

=== Greece ===
Greece
- Prostitution legal and regulated Buying sex legal Brothels legal and regulated Procuring illegal Solicitation illegal

Prostitution is legal at the age of 18. Persons engaged in prostitution must register at the local prefecture and carry a medical card that is updated every two weeks. Greek authorities decided to implement a 1999 law which stipulates that all brothels must have permits. It is estimated that fewer than 1,000 women are legally employed as prostitutes and approximately 20,000 women, most of foreign origin, are engaged in illegal prostitution. According to NGO estimates, there are 13,000-14,000 trafficking victims in the country at any given time. Major countries of origin for trafficking victims include Nigeria, Ukraine, Russia, Bulgaria, Moldova and Belarus.

=== Italy ===
Italy
- Prostitution legal Buying sex legal Brothels illegal Procuring illegal Solicitation legal in certain areas

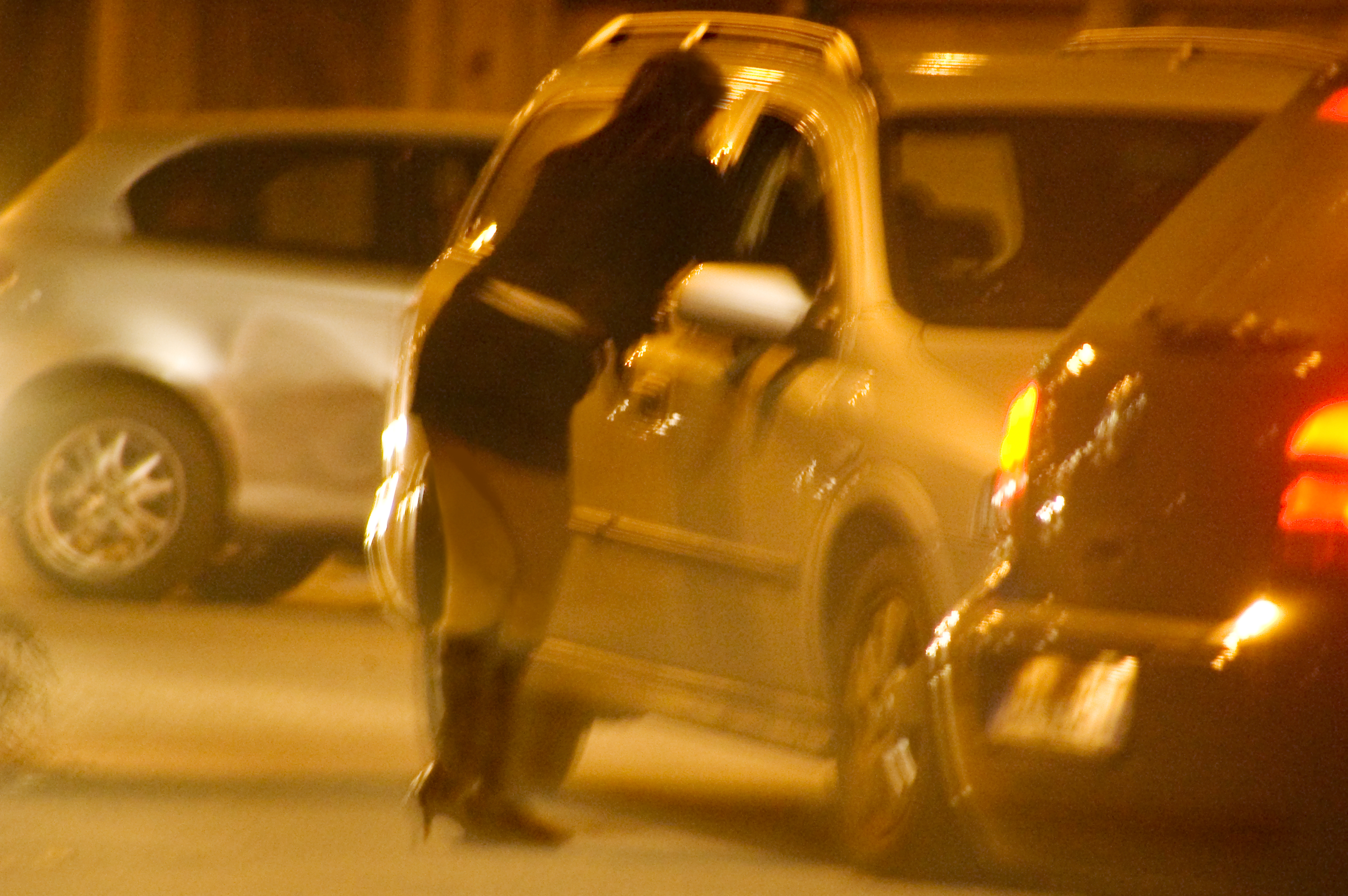
A street prostitute talking to a potential customer in Turin, Italy, 2005

In Italy, prostitution, defined as the exchange of sexual acts for money, is legal, although organized prostitution, whether indoors in brothels or controlled by third parties, is prohibited. Brothels were banned in 1958. Individual sex workers working from apartments are "tolerated". Loitering is permitted, but soliciting ("unabashedly inviting clients on the street") is illegal. Migrants with work or residence permits may work in sex work, and police cannot revoke residence permits and begin deportation procedures, as they tried failing by the Italian laws.

A 2008 report stated that were some 100,000 prostitutes in Italy. In 2007 it was stated that the total number of workers was 70,000. The Italian Statistics Institute stated the number of street workers in 1998 was 50,000.

A euphemism often used to refer to prostitutes in Italy is Lucciole (lit. "fireflies").

=== Kosovo ===
Kosovo
- Prostitution illegal Buying sex legal

Prostitution in Kosovo is illegal, and can incur a prison sentence of up to sixty days. The Global Fund to Fight AIDS, Tuberculosis and Malaria's HIV Program in Kosovo estimated there to be 5,037 prostitutes in the country. Many women turn to prostitution through poverty. There are report that prostitution has become a new organised crime in Kosovo.

Prior to the Kosovo War following the 2008 Kosovo declaration of independence, prostitution was limited to serving the needs of locals. Following the ceasefire and presence in the country of the United Nations Interim Administration Mission in Kosovo and other international organisations, the demand for prostitution soared. As well as women turning to prostitution voluntarily, some were trafficked from Moldova, Bulgaria, and Ukraine.

=== Malta ===
Malta
- Prostitution legal Buying sex legal Brothels illegal Procuring illegal Solicitation illegal

Prostitution itself is legal, but certain activities connected with it, such as running a brothel and loitering, are not. Certain offences are punishable by sentences of up to two years in prison.

In March 2008, police and the Ministry for Social Policy signed a memorandum of understanding to formalize a screening process for all arrested persons engaged in prostitution to determine whether they were victims of trafficking or other abuses. The law provides punishments of up to 6 years for involving minors in prostitution.

=== Montenegro ===
Montenegro
- Prostitution illegal Buying sex legal

Prostitution in Montenegro is illegal.

Montenegro is a source, transit, and destination country for women and children subjected to sex trafficking. Victims of sex trafficking identified in Montenegro are primarily women and girls from Montenegro, neighbouring Balkan countries, and, to a lesser extent, other countries in Eastern Europe. Sex trafficking victims are exploited in hospitality facilities, bars, restaurants, night clubs, and cafes.

=== North Macedonia ===
North Macedonia
- Prostitution legal Buying sex legal Brothels illegal Procuring illegal Solicitation illegal

Prostitution in North Macedonia is legal, though with various restrictions, and common. UNAIDS estimated that there were 3588 prostitutes in the country in 2016. In 2003 North Macedonia's government was reported to be trying to reduce sex trafficking.

STAR-STAR (an association for the support of marginalised workers) is a sex-worker-led support group. Its executive board is exclusively made up of sex workers. STAR-STAR was the first sex workers' collective in the Balkans.

The country is a major transit point for prostitution to the west. In 2003 it was reported that the trafficking of women from the Balkans to Western Europe for sex was worth billions of dollars, with the beneficiaries including the Albanian National Liberation Army in North Macedonia.

=== Portugal ===
Portugal
- Prostitution legal Buying sex legal Brothels illegal Procuring illegal

In Portugal, prostitution itself is legal, but it is illegal for a third party to profit from, promote, encourage, or facilitate the prostitution of another person. Consequently, organized prostitution (brothels, prostitution rings, or other forms of pimping) is prohibited. Forced prostitution and human trafficking are also illegal.

In the mid-2000s, the number of female prostitutes was estimated at 28,000, of which at least 50% were foreigners.

=== San Marino ===
San Marino
- Prostitution illegal Buying sex legal

Prostitution in San Marino is illegal, and is not commonplace.

=== Serbia ===
Serbia
- Prostitution illegal Buying sex legal

Prostitution in Serbia is illegal, and can incur a prison sentence of up to 30 days, and up to 60 days for minors. Pimping is illegal and can incur a prison sentence of between 6 months and 5 years, and between 1 and 10 years for pimping minors. UNAIDS estimate there to be 3,901 prostitutes in the country.

Following a large police action against prostitution in Belgrade's major hotels in late September 2017, Minister of Public Administration and Local Self-Government Branko Ružić voiced support for legalizing and regulating prostitution. Serbian Radical Party president Vojislav Šešelj supported the proposal, under the condition that prostitutes undergo regular health checks for sexually transmitted diseases.

=== Slovenia ===
Slovenia
- Prostitution legal Buying sex legal Procuring illegal Solicitation illegal

Prostitution in Slovenia was decriminalised in June 2003. Forcing others into prostitution is an offence under Article 175 of the Criminal Code.

=== Spain ===
Spain
- Prostitution legal Buying sex legal Brothels illegal Procuring illegal Solicitation illegal in certain areas

Prostitution itself is legal in Spain, but pimping is not. Owning an establishment where prostitution takes place is legal if the owner neither derives financial gain from prostitution nor hires any person for the purposes of selling sex, because prostitution is not considered a job, and has no legal recognition. Most places do not regulate prostitution, but the government of Catalonia offers licenses for persons "to gather people to practice prostitution". These licenses are used by brothel owners to open 'clubs', where prostitution takes place (the women are theoretically only 'gathered' to work on the premises not employed by the owner). Some places have implemented fines for street prostitution.

=== Turkey ===
Turkey
- Prostitution legal and regulated Buying sex legal Brothels legal and regulated Procuring illegal Condoms mandatory

In Turkey, prostitution is legal and regulated. Prostitutes must register and acquire an ID card stating the dates of their health checks. Also, it is mandatory for registered prostitutes to have regular health checks for sexually transmitted diseases. The police are allowed to check the authenticity of registered prostitutes to determine whether they have been examined properly and to ensure they see the health authorities if they don't. Men cannot register under this regulation. Most sex workers, however, are unregistered, as local governments have made it a policy not to issue new registrations. As a result, most sex workers in Turkey are not registered sex workers, working in violation of the law. Turkey is listed by the UNODC as one of the top destinations for victims of human trafficking.

=== Vatican City ===
Vatican City
- Prostitution illegal Buying sex illegal

Prostitution in Vatican City is illegal and is not commonplace.

== Western Europe ==
=== Austria ===
Austria
- Prostitution legal and regulated Buying sex legal Brothels legal and regulated Procuring illegal

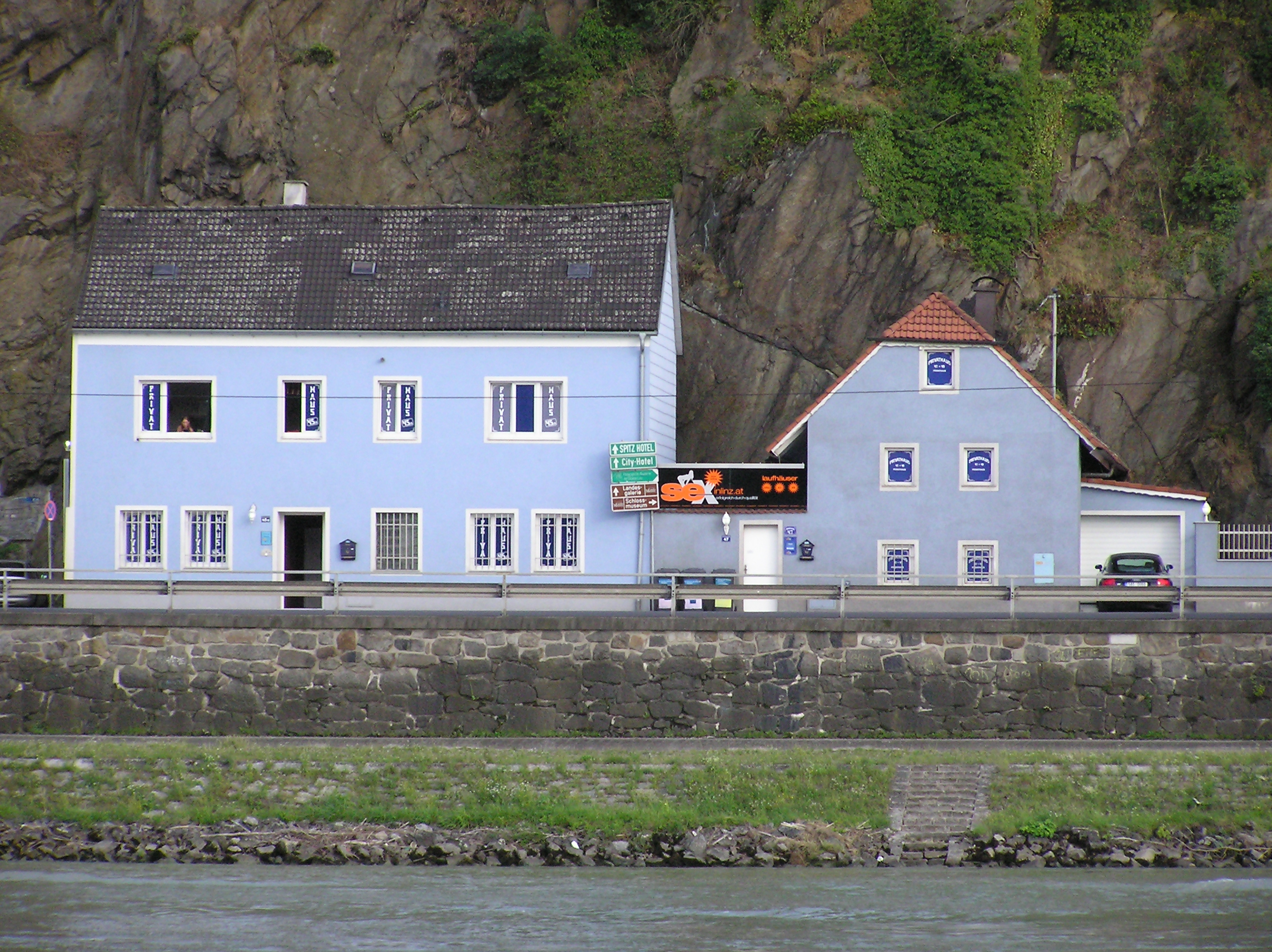
Brothel in Linz, the third-largest city in Austria

Prostitution in Austria is legal and regulated under the penal code (Strafgesetzbuch), under Zehnter Abschnitt Strafbare Handlungen gegen die sexuelle Integrität und Selbstbestimmung (§§ 201-220b) (Part Ten: Offences against sexual integrity and self-determination (§ § 201-220b)). Most sex workers are migrants. According to a 2010 TAMPEP study, 78% of sex workers in Austria are foreigners.

Although sex work itself is not forbidden, Section 207bSexueller Missbrauch von Jugendlichen (Sexual abuse of juveniles) allows for prosecution of clients of workers younger than 18. Additional restrictions are specified in § 214 to 217. Medical examinations are required by the AIDS and STD laws. The laws of the federal States of Austria place further restrictions on the times and places where prostitution may occur. The most restrictive law is that of Vorarlberg, where prostitution is legal only in licensed brothels and to date no such licenses have been issued.

=== Belgium ===
Belgium
- Prostitution legal Buying sex legal Brothels legal Procuring illegal Solicitation illegal

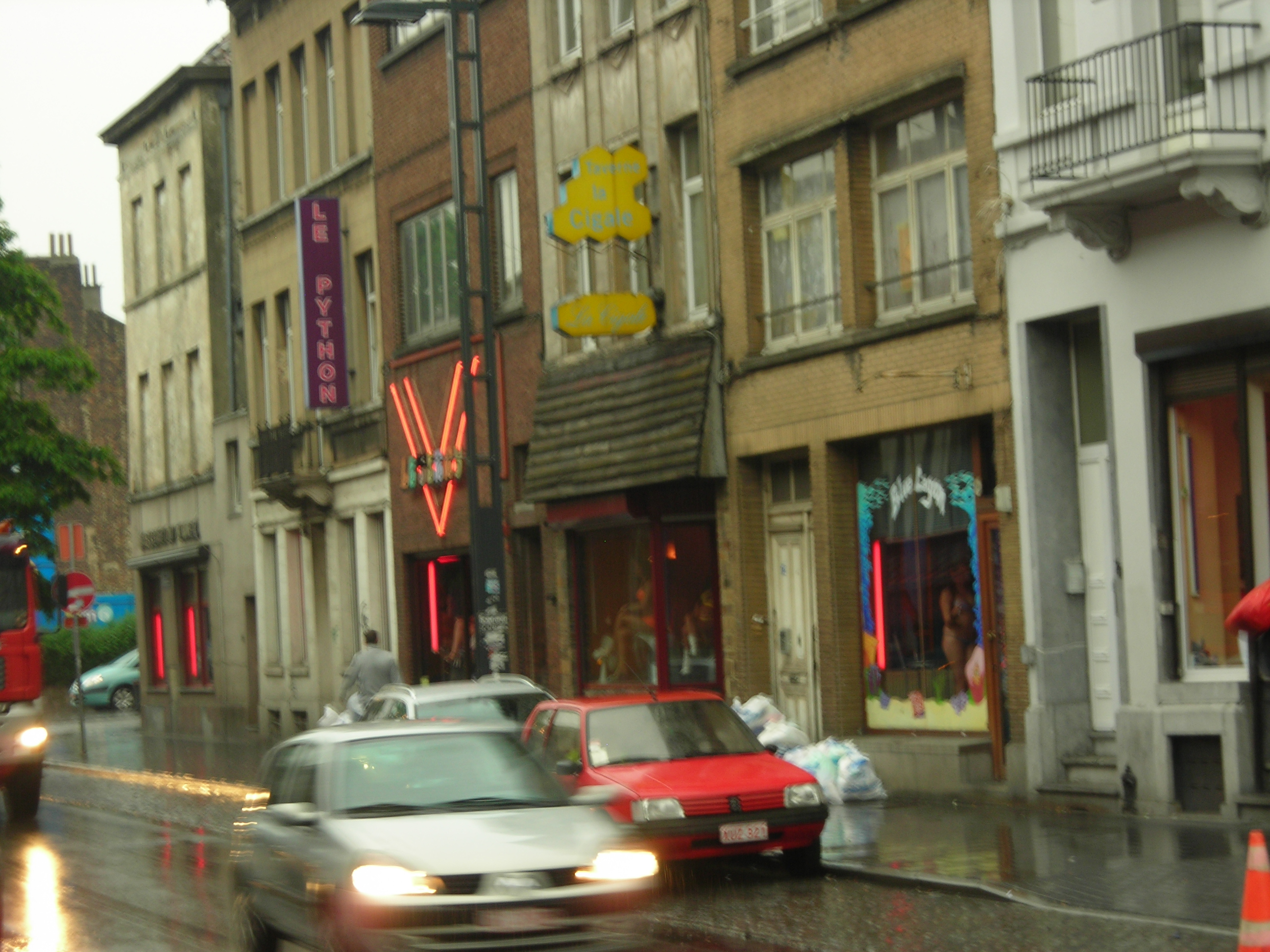
Rue d'Aerschot, Brussels, which has a portion of the street with red lights and prostitutes visible

Prostitution is decriminalized in Belgium since 1 June 2022, but the law prohibits pimping, or assisting immigration for the purpose of prostitution. However, in practice, enforcement can be lax, and "unofficial" brothels are tolerated (for example in Antwerp). Human trafficking or exploiting individuals for financial gain is punishable for a maximum prison sentence of 30 years. A recent report by RiskMonitor foundation states that 80% of the prostitutes who work as windows prostitutes in Belgium are from Bulgaria. Belgium is listed by the UNODC as a top destination for victims of human trafficking. Many sex workers organisations feel that the present grey area in which prostitution operates leaves sex workers vulnerable to exploitation.

A report commissioned by the National Bank of Belgium, estimated a turnover of 840 million Euro in 2015. The most important segments of the market seem to be escort and private prostitution, rather than the more visible forms of window or street prostitution.

=== France ===
France
- Prostitution legal Buying sex illegal Brothels illegal Procuring illegal Solicitation legal

Prostitution in France (the exchange of sexual acts for money) was legal until April 2016, but several surrounding activities were illegal, like operating a brothel, living off the avails (pimping), and paying for sex with someone under the age of 18 (the age of consent for sex is 15). On 6 April 2016, the French National Assembly voted to punish customers of prostitutes by a fine of €1500. The law has been evaluated as a failure, putting sex workers in danger, reducing prices, and decreasing condom use among their clients.

In the Napoleonic era, France became the model for the regulatory approach to prostitution. In the 20th century, however, a policy shift became apparent. Brothels became illegal in 1946, and France signed the Convention for the Suppression of the Traffic in Persons and of the Exploitation of the Prostitution of Others in 1960. France thus became a major supporter of the international abolitionist movement for the eradication of prostitution.

=== Germany ===
Germany
- Prostitution legal and regulated Buying sex legal Brothels legal and regulated Procuring illegal Solicitation restricted Condoms mandatory

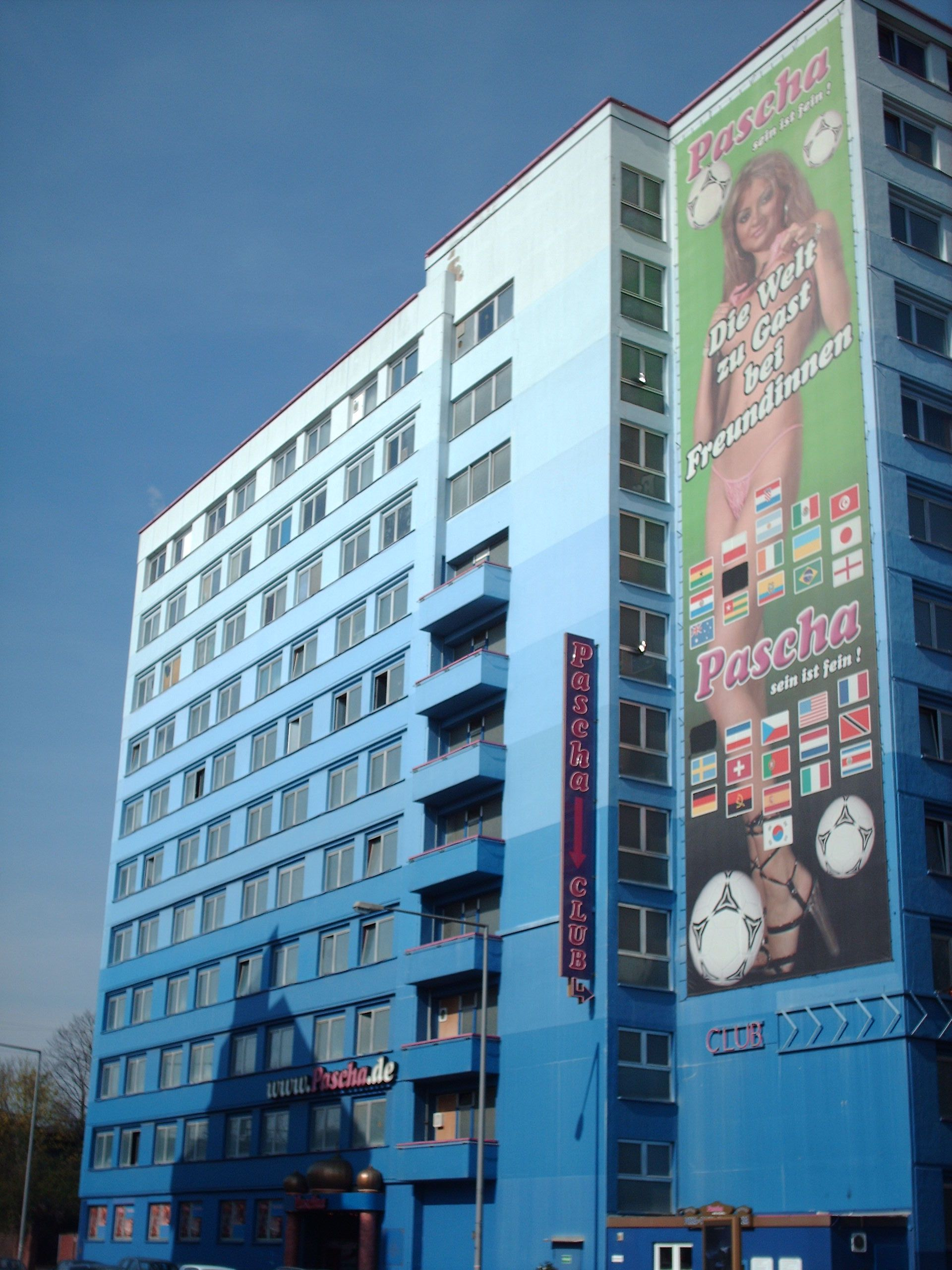
Pascha brothel in Cologne, Germany

Prostitution in Germany is legal, as are all aspects of the sex industry, including brothels, advertisement, and job offers through HR companies. Full-service sex work is widespread and regulated by the German government, which levies taxes on it. In 2002, the government changed the law in an effort to improve the legal situation of sex workers. However, the social stigmatization of sex work persists and many workers continue to lead a double life.

=== Liechtenstein ===
Liechtenstein
- Prostitution illegal Buying sex legal

Prostitution in Liechtenstein is illegal, but is tolerated by the police as long as it is not street prostitution.

=== Luxembourg ===
Luxembourg
- Prostitution legal Buying sex legal Brothels illegal Procuring illegal Solicitation restricted

Prostitution itself is legal in Luxembourg, but activities associated with organised prostitution, such as profiting from (operating brothels and prostitution rings) or aiding prostitution, are illegal. Human trafficking incurs severe penalties. There are estimated to be 300 prostitutes in Luxembourg, most of whom are immigrants.

Street prostitution is only permitted in two streets near Luxembourg City's railway station, and only between 20:00 and 03:00. The area is regulated by the city authorities, and patrolled regularly by the police. Prostitutes working outside these streets or outside the permitted times may be arrested and fined up to €2,500. Because of the number of prostitutes and limited area to work in, some work from other streets near the legalised area and risk being arrested.

=== Monaco ===
Monaco
- Prostitution legal Buying sex legal Brothels illegal Procuring illegal Solicitation illegal

Prostitution itself is legal in Monaco, but organized prostitution (brothels, prostitution rings and other forms of pimping) is prohibited. Solicitation is also illegal. Forcing another person into prostitution is illegal, with penalties from six months to three years of imprisonment, plus a fine. A husband who forces his wife to engage in prostitution can be sentenced to one to five years of imprisonment plus a fine.

Prostitution takes place most commonly in hotels, bars and nightclubs.

=== Netherlands ===
Netherlands
- Prostitution legal and regulated Buying sex legal Brothels legal and regulated Solicitation legal

Prostitution is legal and regulated in the Netherlands. Operating a brothel is also legal. From 1 January 2022, a customer will be punished if they purchase a sexual service from a sex worker of whom they know or have serious reason to suspect that there is coercion, exploitation or human trafficking. In the last few years, a significant number of brothels and "windows" have been closed because of suspected criminal activity. De Wallen, the largest and best-known red-light district in Amsterdam, is a destination for international sex tourism. In an attempt to fight abuse, the minimum age for prostitutes was raised from 18 to 21 years.

Prostitution is concentrated in and around the big cities and in the border towns in the regions of Limburg, Groningen, Twente, West Brabant and Zeeland. Prostitution occurs in various forms: 'window' and street prostitution, clubs, escort agencies, and home-based prostitution. 'Window' prostitution occurs in 12 cities in the Netherlands. It is estimated that on average some 2,000 prostitutes are engaged daily in this form of prostitution. Street prostitution exists in 10 Dutch cities and involves on average some 320 prostitutes daily. Between 3,500 and 4,000 prostitutes are employed daily in 600–700 clubs and private brothels. The extent of other forms of prostitution such as escort agencies and home-based prostitution is much more difficult to estimate. Home-based prostitution occurs in at least 17 municipalities and escort agencies exist in at least 28 municipalities.

Due to the coronavirus pandemic, all legally operating brothels in the Netherlands were closed on 15 March 2020, based on emergency orders per police district. Since the Dutch government failed to provide financial compensation for sex workers (especially those who have always paid taxes through the 'opting-in'-system), many of them were forced to continue to work, turning to illegal home-based prostitution. Christian politicians in Dutch parliament claimed they wanted to help women to escape from exploitation, but sex workers' unions angrily responded that they don't want to be 'saved' by people who would like to forbid prostitution again. The temporary ban on prostitution in the Netherlands will be lifted on 1 July 2020, but could be reinstated later, at any time a serious coronavirus outbreak would occur.

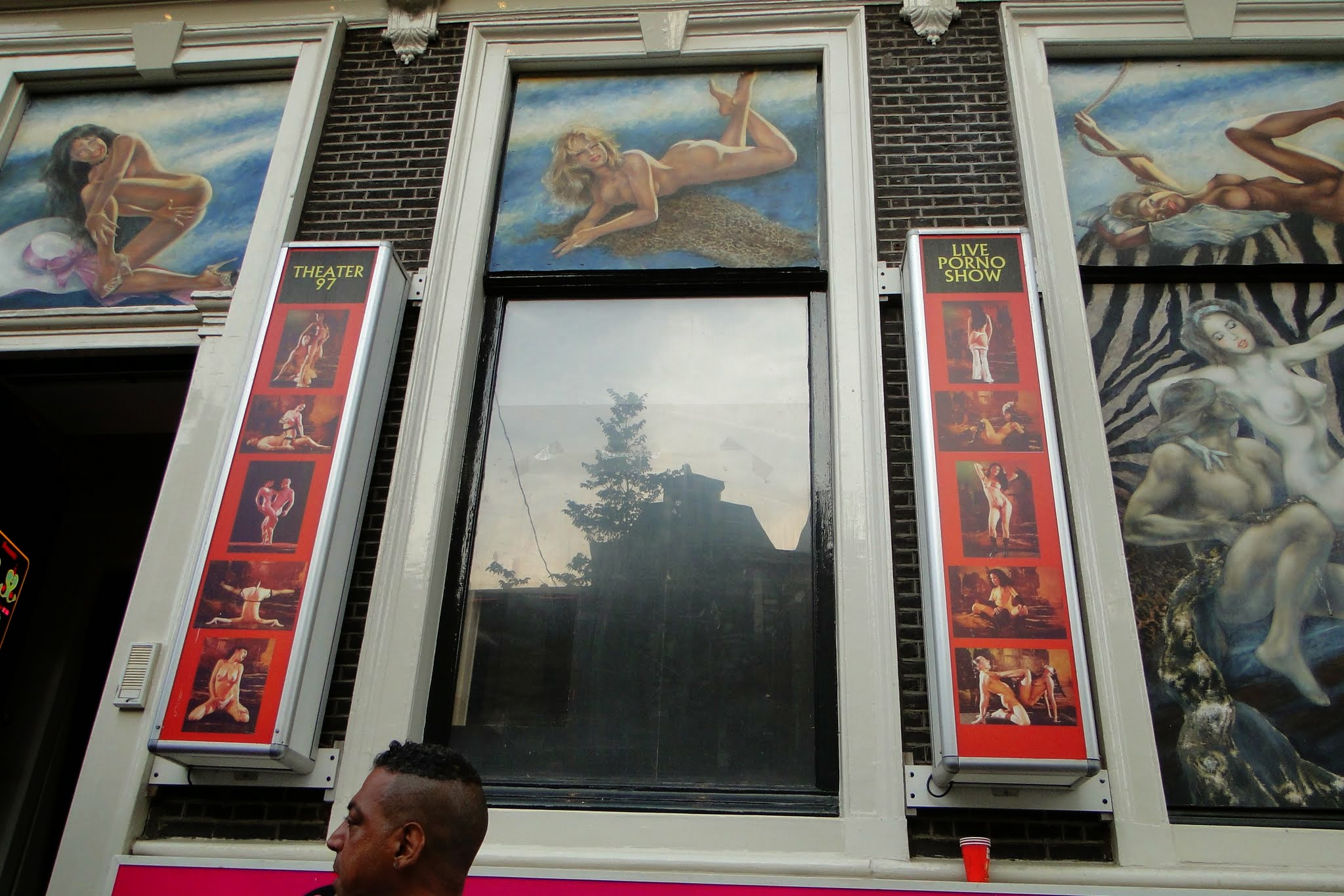
Sex theater in De Wallen

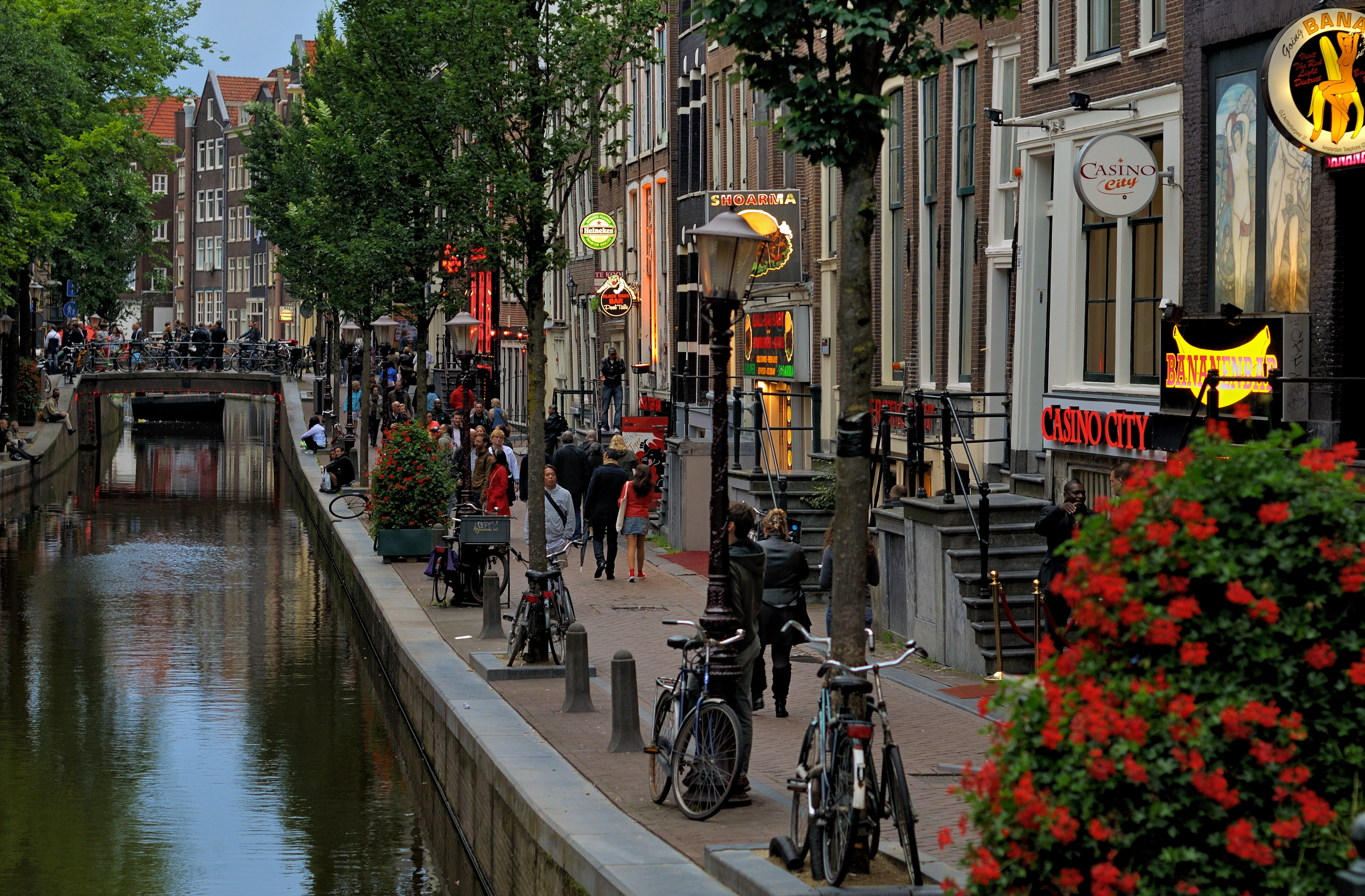
De Wallen, Amsterdam's red-light district

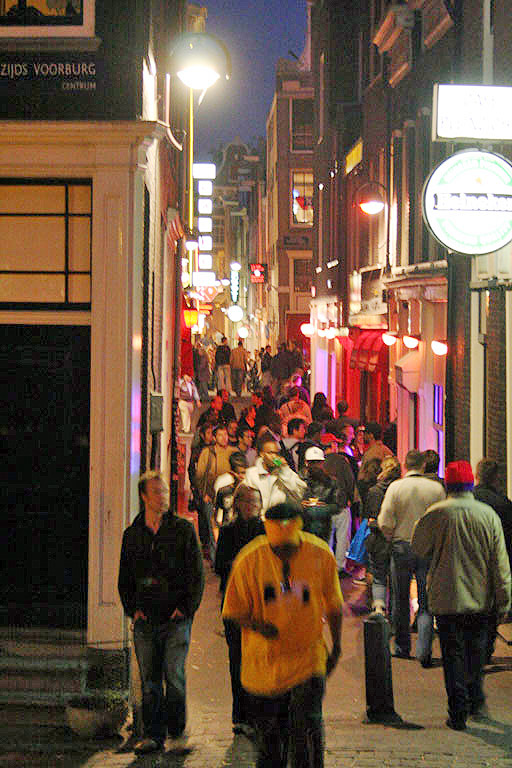
Locals and tourists visiting De Wallen

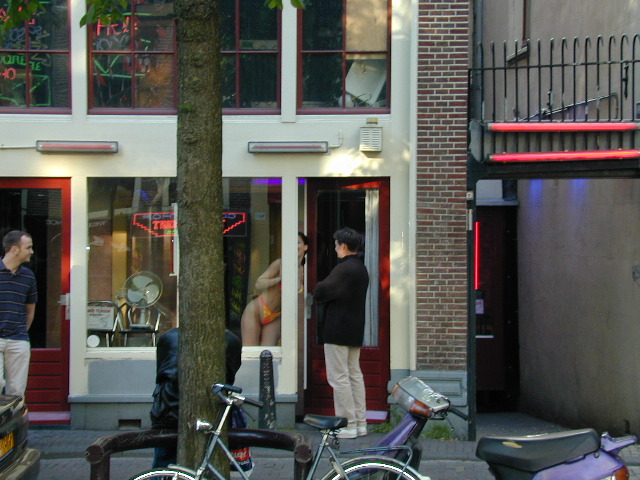
Scene from Amsterdam's red light district

=== Switzerland ===
Switzerland
- Prostitution legal and regulated Buying sex legal Brothels legal and regulated Procuring illegal Solicitation legal in designated areas

Full-service sex work in Switzerland is legal and regulated; it has been legal since 1942. Trafficking, forcing people into prostitution and most forms of pimping are illegal. Licensed brothels, typically with a reception and leading to several studio apartments, are available. One estimate puts the number of street sex workers in Zurich at 5000.

In recent years the number of full-service sex workers has increased. Many workers operate using newspaper advertisements, mobile phones and secondary rented apartments, some accept credit cards.

== See also ==
- Prostitution by region
- Prostitution law
- Nordic Model approach to prostitution
