= Red-light districts in Belgium =

Prostitution is legal in Belgium, but making gains from third party activities such as pimping is illegal. Most of the red-light districts in Belgium consist of window prostitution, where prostitutes sit in a window with a curtained-off workspace behind, although there is also some street prostitution.

== Red-light districts by city ==
=== Brussels ===
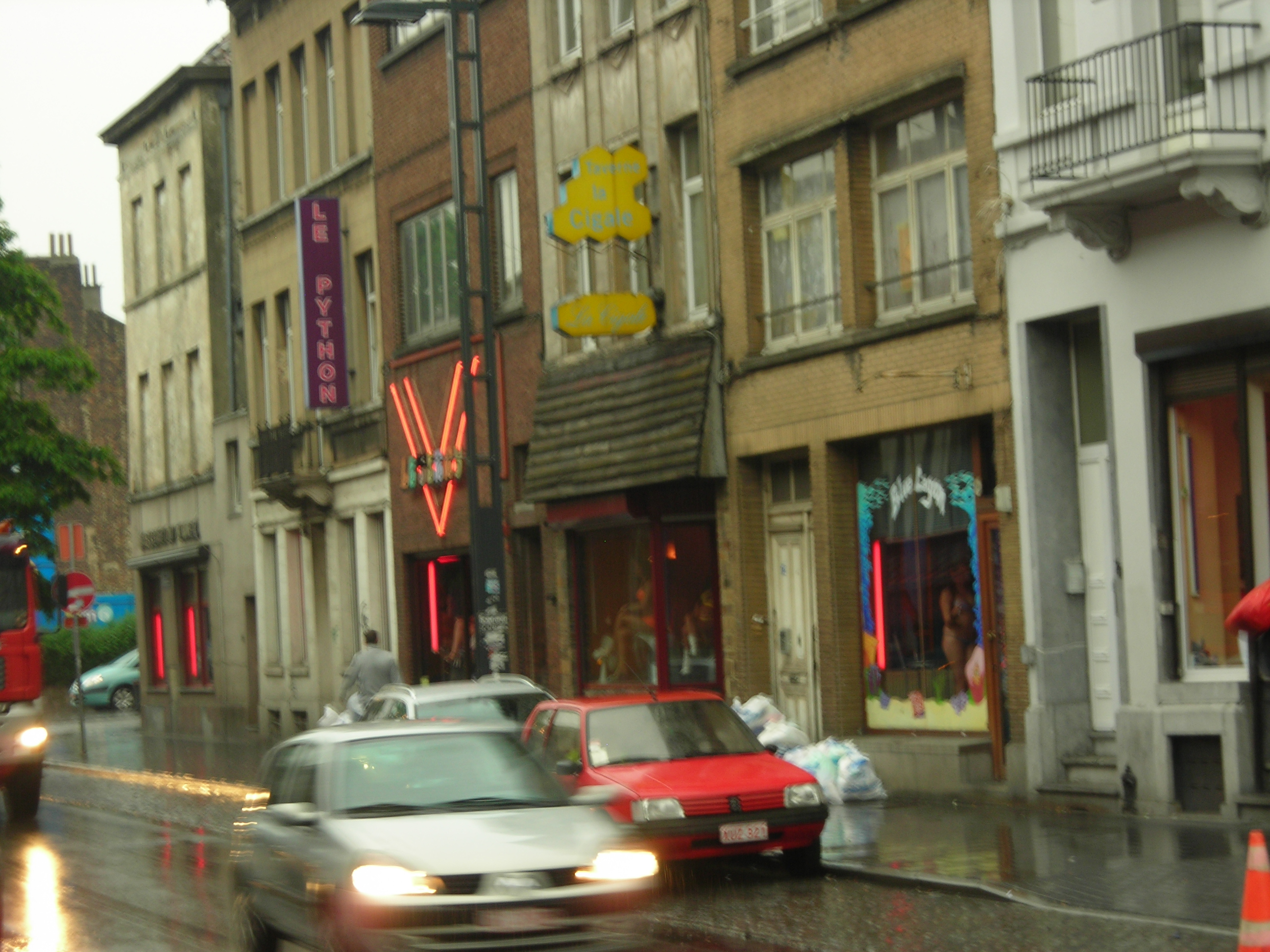
Rue d'Aerschot, Brussels

The main red light district in Brussels is north of Brussels-North railway station in the Rue d'Aerschot/Aarschotstraat and surrounding side-streets. As of 2008, there were about 250-300 prostitutes working in about 60 windows in the area. In the Rue d'Aerschot, the majority of women were Bulgarian, while those working in side-streets were mostly from Nigeria. In 2018, Nigerian prostitute Eunice Osayande was murdered by a client, leading to protests by prostitutes who called for better working conditions. The City of Brussels named a street after her to draw attention to the "forgotten women who are victims of human trafficking, sexual violence and femicides". Typically, in 2024, a prostitute would pay about €250 to rent the window for twelve hours and would need to service five or six clients to cover the cost.

Street prostitution has traditionally taken place in the Alhambra quarter of Brussels to the south-west of the North Station. In 2014, local authorities introduced a measure to restrict street prostitution to an area around the Boulevard d'Anvers/Antwerpselaan but the measure was unsuccessful and prostitutes continued to work in the small streets around the Rue De Laeken/Lakensestraat. By 2022, there were an increasing number of Chinese sex workers in the area and, in 2023, the police dismantled a Chinese human trafficking ring that brought women to Brussels for the purposes of prostitution.

A second, smaller area of street prostitution is along the Avenue Louise/Louizalaan, an up-market area to the south of the city, where prostitutes cater to a clientele from expensive hotels in the area. The Place Fontainas/Fontainasplein in central Brussels has traditionally been an area for gay prostitution.

=== Antwerp ===
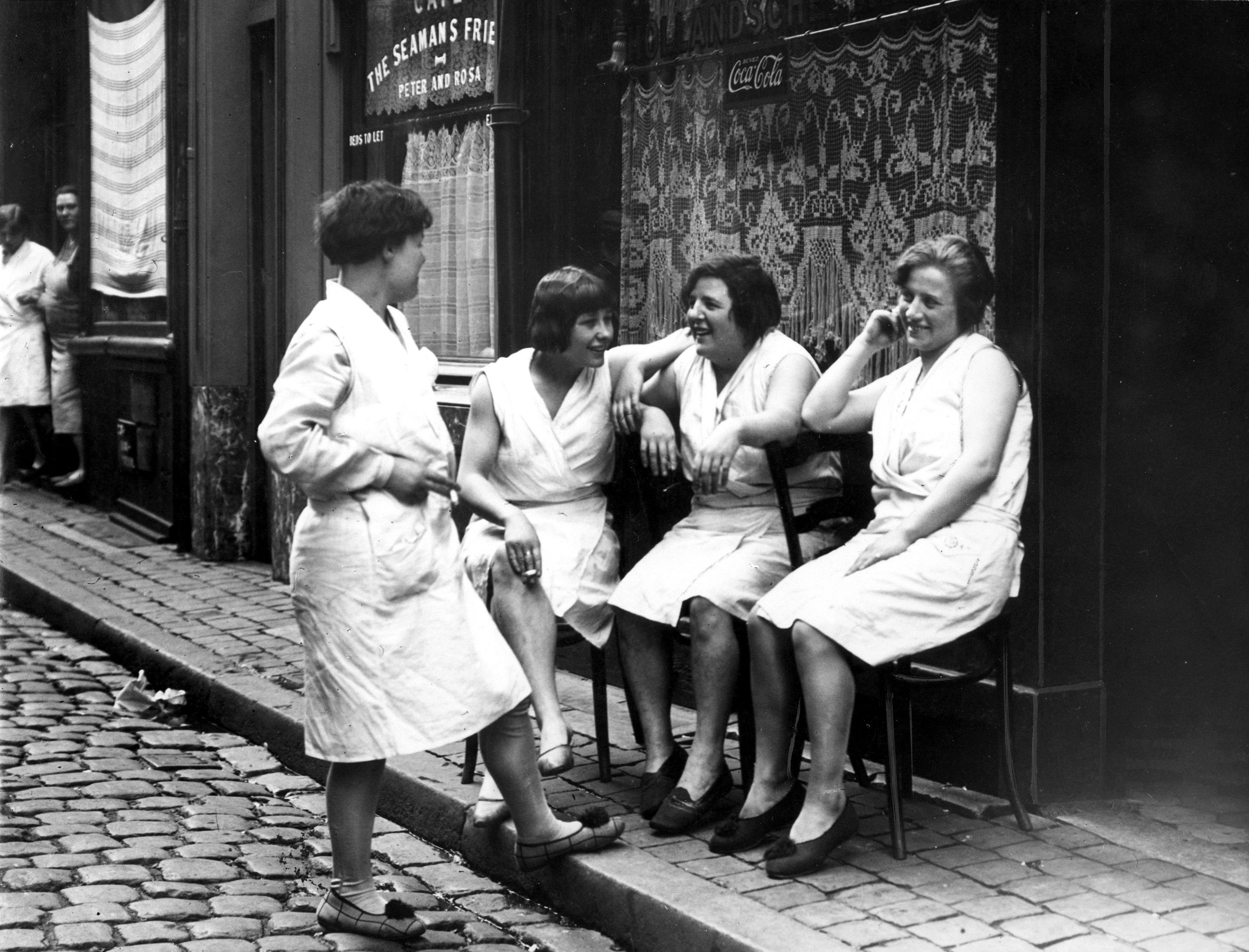
Prostitutes in Schipperskwartier in 1929

In Antwerp, prostitution is only permitted in the area bounded by Verversrui, Vingerlingstraat and Schippersstraat, in an area known locally as Schipperskwartier (sailors' quarter). Near the old port, the area has been a centre for prostitution for centuries. By the 1990s, there were about 240 windows in 17 streets in the Schipperskwartier and three streets near Antwerpen-Centraal railway station. An influx of prostitutes from Eastern Europe had seen an associated rise in organised crime and violence. In May 1999, a 17-year-old Romanian prostitute was murdered in the Schipperskwartier; advances in DNA profiling led to the arrest in Italy and extradition of her Albanian pimp in 2024. Increasing public concern led the city council to approve plans in 1999 to restrict prostitution to a single tolerance zone in the Schipperskwartier, introduce measures to minimise opportunities for organised crime, reduce public nuisance and improve conditions for prostitutes. The city invested more than n €10 million in the regeneration of the Schipperskwartier.

Between Verversrui and Schippersstraat in the tolerance zone is the Villa Tinto. Previously an industrial building, it was converted by architect Arne Quinze and Flemish interior designers into a complex with 51 windows. The project was set up by Franky De Coninck, a Belgian businessman. In an attempt to prevent trafficking, only women with EU passports can work there and there are biometric keypads to the rooms so there can be no subletting. Each room is equipped with a panic button. Nearby is a clinic and a police post. The clinic provides free and anonymous counselling and testing and treatment for sexually transmitted infections.

In 2016, about 400 prostitutes worked in shifts in about 280 windows in the tolerance zone. The majority of them were from Bulgaria, Romania and Nigeria. Street prostitution is not allowed in Antwerp Gay prostitution takes place in sauna clubs, bars or parks rather than in the tolerance zone.

=== Charleroi ===
Until the end of the 1990s, prostitution in Charleroi took place mainly in bars, but since then street prostitution has been the dominant form of prostitution in the city. In 2002, local authorities limited street prostitution to an area of the lower town known as the Triangle, consisting of the Rue Desandrouin, Rue du Moulin and Rue de la Fenderie. Subsequent regeneration of the lower town and construction of a shopping centre saw prostitution banned in the Triangle and moved to an area beyond the ring road. After prostitutes began to return to the more central area, the council banned street prostitution in 2014. Prostitution continued to be allowed in bars in Gosselies on the faubourg de Bruxelles and the N5.

=== Ghent ===
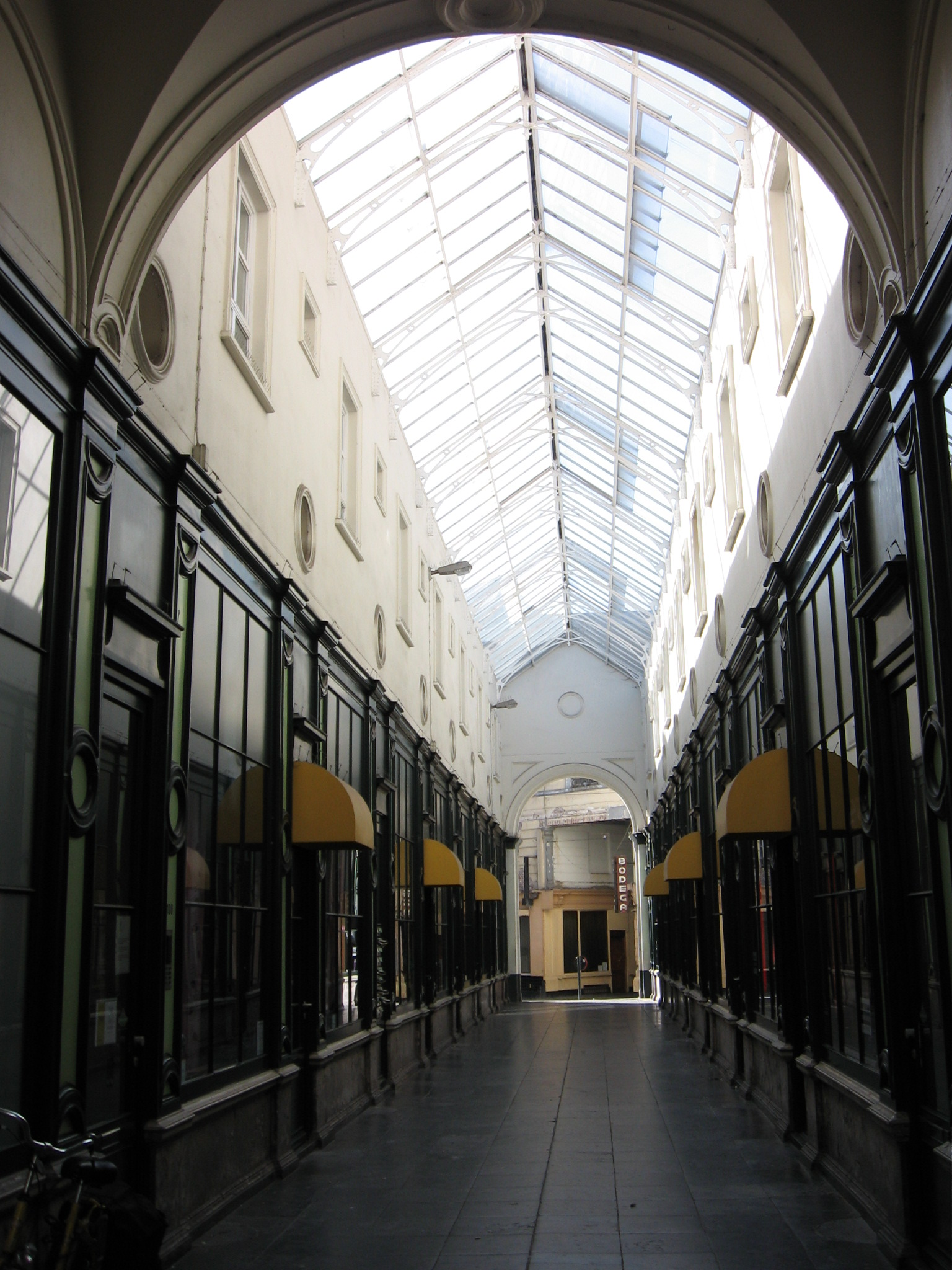
Glazen Straatje

The red light district in Ghent is situated in the south of the city in the area around Schepenenvijverstraat and Belgradostraat. It includes a glass-roofed arcade known as Glazen Straatje. As of 2018, the district included about 100 windows. In 2015, the city authorities followed the example of Antwerp and improved conditions for prostitutes working in windows, requiring the building owners to install alarm buttons and amenities such as showers. Prostitutes in windows are, under pain of a fine, required to dress in a respectable way and refrain from dancing or assuming sexual poses.

=== Liège ===
The Rue Varin, in the Liège-Cathédrale quarter of Liège, had been a centre on prostitution since the 19th century. The area was partially demolished in the early 2000s for the rebuilding of Liège-Guillemins railway station. The remaining buildings were renovated as part of the gentrification of the area and prostitution stopped.

An area of window prostitution in Liège around the Rue du Champion and the Rue de l'Agneau near the river Meuse's west bank was closed down in 2009, leading to an increase in street prostitution in the area and around the Grande Poste. Following the closure of the windows, about 180 prostitutes moved to Seraing. In 2009, the council announced a plan to build an Eros Centre for prostitutes to work in, but the plan was cancelled in 2015.

=== Ostend ===
In 2018, the municipality of Ostend announced plans to clear the red light district of Hazegras and convert an abandoned hangar with protected architectural status into a "mega-brothel".

=== Seraing ===
The centre for window prostitution in Seraing was traditionally in the Rue Marnix. There were about 100 prostitutes working in Seraing until the closure of windows in Liège, when about 180 prostitutes moved to Seraing. A plan to build an Eros Centre was abandoned in 2019.

=== Sint-Truiden ===
There are a number of windows along Luikersteenweg, Sint-Truiden. The street is known locally as the "Chaussée d'Amour". In 2017, 42 permits for prostitution premises were issued, but the mayor of Sint-Truiden said regulations needed to be tightened. Weekly checks on working conditions and work permits were being carried out by the local police.

== See also ==
- Prostitution in Belgium
- Red-light district
- List of red-light districts
