= Urmila (disambiguation) =

Urmila was the wife of Lakshmana, one of the three younger brothers of Rama in the Indian epic Ramayana.

Urmila may also refer to:

- Urmila Aryal, Nepalese politician
- Urmila Bhatt (1934–1997), Indian actress
- Urmila Bhoola, South African human rights lawyer
- Urmila Kanitkar (21st century), Indian film actress in Marathi cinema
- Urmila Mahanta (21st century), Indian actress
- Urmila Matondkar (born 1974), an Indian actress
- Urmila Satyanarayana, Indian classical dancer of bharatanatyam
- Urmila Tiwari (21st century), Indian stage and television actress
- Urmila Unni, Indian actress, appearing in Malayalam films
- Urmila (leafhopper), a leafhopper genus in the tribe Erythroneurini
