= Prostitution in Belgium =

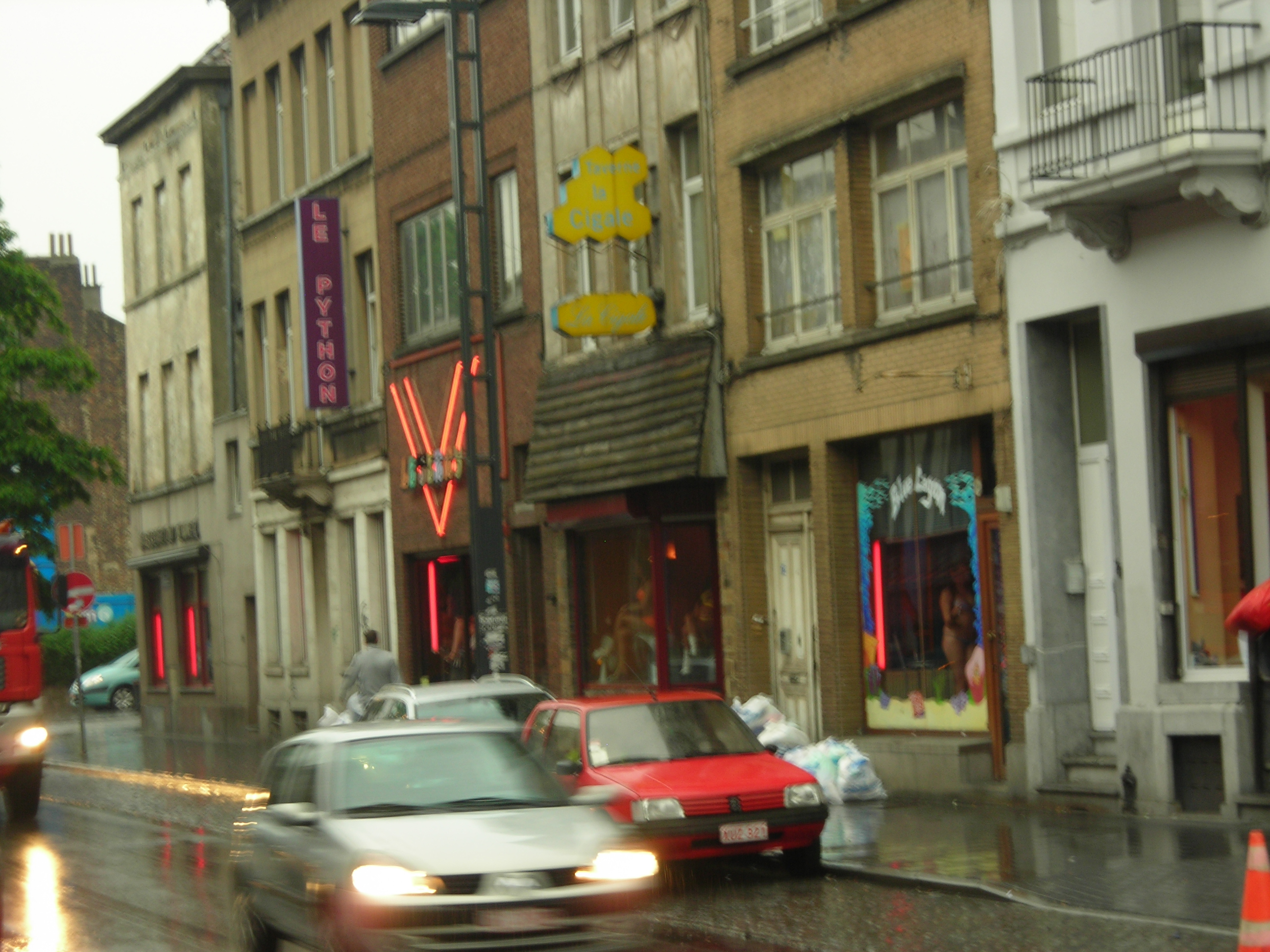
Rue d'Aerschot, one of the red-light districts in Brussels (pictured in 2008).

Prostitution in Belgium is legal and was decriminalized on 1 June 2022. Human trafficking or exploiting individuals involved in prostitution is punishable by a maximum prison sentence of 30 years.

Some cities in Belgium have a red-light district, often with window prostitution. In 2015, it was estimated that there were 26,000 prostitutes in Belgium, many of them from Bulgaria.

A report commissioned by the National Bank of Belgium, estimated the revenue from heterosexual prostitution to be €840 million ($930 million) in 2015. The most important segments of the market were escorting and private prostitution, rather than the more visible forms of window and street prostitution which made up only 30%.

Since 1 December 2024, sex workers or prostitutes within Belgium have had legal access to maternity leave, pensions and unemployment benefits. Belgium is the first country in the world to implement and enact these reforms.

== Legal framework ==
Prior to 1946, prostitution was regulated by the municipalities, with mandatory registration and medical checks. In 1946, Federal legislation replaced local control of prostitution; however, the municipalities could still regulate in their local area for the sake of public order or morality.

Prostitution and paying for sexual services were not prohibited in the 1946 legislation, but Article 380 added the following offences:

- Procuring;
- Procuring through the provision of premises (running a brothel, providing premises for prostitution etc.) for unjust gain;
- Aggravated pimping (violence, threats, deception or exploitation of a vulnerable situation);
- Solicitation;
- Advertising for the purposes of prostitution.

The 1995 Criminal Law Reform Act made some modification to the existing laws:

- Prohibition of soliciting was extended to include all forms of communication;
- Legislation in connection with procuring was relaxed, providing abnormally high gains are not made (although "abnormally high gains" is not defined);
- Increase in penalties for human trafficking;
- Powers given to the courts to close premises and confiscate property.

In 2005, the 1995 Act was amended to give greater power against human trafficking, including an increase in maximum sentences. The 1995 Act also brought the Belgian law in line with the European Union law and international instruments that had been introduced in the previous years.

On 1 June 2022, sex work was decriminalized in Belgium.

=== Proposed reforms ===
Before the decriminalisation of prostitution in 2022, there were a number of draft bills proposing changes to the previous prostitution laws. Proposals from the pro-prostitution camp included licensing brothels and giving special status within the law to sex-workers. The anti-prostitution camp proposals included the banning of window prostitution and criminalisation of paying for sexual services (as stated in the Nordic Model).

=== Decriminalisation ===
A law passed in March 2022 by the Federal Parliament decriminalised sex work and third parties who make sex work possible (for example accountants, banks and "chauffeurs"). It also allowed some advertising by sex workers. This law came into effect on 1 June 2022. The new law also gives sex workers' rights in terms of status, social protection, and healthcare, like other self-employed workers. The new law included (but was not limited to): social security, unemployment, access to health care and parental leave.

=== Employment rights ===
Belgium enacted a labour law in December 2024 granting sex workers the same social rights as other employees, including the ability to sign employment contracts and access social security benefits. Employers must undergo a criminal background check and obtain a license to hire sex workers legally.

While the law aims to decriminalize specific aspects of the industry and provide protections, it has faced criticism for potentially benefiting pimps and traffickers and not adequately supporting migrant sex workers and victims of human trafficking.

== Local control ==
Municipalities can impose local regulation on public order or morality grounds. Generally, these powers were little used until the 2000s, most preferring an "unregulated tolerance" approach.

In the 2000s the municipalities took different approaches to regulation. Some, such as Liège and Ghent, banned window prostitution or moved it out of its traditional locations in the city centres. Others, such as Antwerp, totally restructured its red-light district and heavily regulated it.

== History ==
Prostitution was known to exist in what is now Belgium since the Middle Ages. Regulation of prostitutes was introduced during the Burgundian regime (1384–1482) but often ignored. In Brussels, the public executioner was tasked with controlling the trade in the city.

During the French regime (1794–1814) prostitutes were required to undergo mandatory health checks in hospitals. After the Belgian Revolution brought about independence in 1830, the Regulation System set up by the French continued. In 1844, identity cards were issued to prostitutes and twice weekly medical check-ups were required.

The "White Slave Scandal" ("affaire des petite Anglaises") in 1880/1881 brought prostitution in Brussels into the spotlight. Over 40 minors, mainly English girls, were found to be working in brothels after being lured to Brussels with promises of work in bars and nightclubs. As well as those involved being prosecuted, the Mayor and Head of Police in Brussels were forced to resign.

During WW1, the occupying Germans took over control of prostitution. In an attempt to prevent the spread of STIs amongst their troops, the trade was strictly regulated and women forced to undergo regular health checks.

The regulatory regime was regarded as discriminatory towards women in the 1940s, leading to Isabelle Blume's proposals being passed as federal law in 1946.

== Sex trafficking ==
Belgium is listed by the UNODC as a destination for victims of human trafficking, the victims being mainly Moroccan, Romanian, Chinese, Nigerian, Bulgarian and Tunisian nationals.

The efforts by the Belgian authorities to eradicate trafficking was cited by United Nations special rapporteur Urmila Bhoola as "an example of good practice" in 2015.

In 2016, 184 people were prosecuted for sex trafficking and 144 victims of trafficking were assisted. The victims are given help in specialised NGO-run shelters, and when they leave the shelters they are given protection, residence and employment permits and access to legal services. In 2017 there were 176 sex traffickers prosecuted and 59 victims assisted.

The United States Department of State Office to Monitor and Combat Trafficking in Persons ranks Belgium as a 'Tier 1' country.

== See also ==
- Red-light districts in Belgium
