= Eunice Osayande =

Murdered Nigerian sex worker

- Died: June 2018 (aged 23); Brussels, Belgium
- Occupation: Sex worker

Eunice Nancy Osayande was a Nigerian woman who was trafficked to Belgium for prostitution and was murdered in Brussels in June 2018 when she was 23 years old. A street in Brussels was named after her in 2023.

== Life in Belgium ==
Osayande was trafficked to Belgium in 2016 after being led to believe she would be able to find acting work in the country. On the journey to Europe, which involved crossing the Mediterranean Sea in a rubber dinghy, she was repeatedly raped. Once in Belgium, she was forced into prostitution and told she owed her traffickers €45,000 (£38,000; $52,000). She worked in a window on the Rue Linné/Linnéstraat near Brussels-North railway station. In 2018, she contacted a charity for sex workers because she was experiencing violence and intimidation and was afraid to go to the police as she was an undocumented migrant.

== Murder ==
Osayande was killed on the night of 4–5 June 2018 by a client who stabbed her multiple times. She was 23 years old. The following day, Nigerian prostitutes working in the area organised a two-day strike, with the slogan "We need care, not violence". On 14 June, about 150 people, including about 40 Nigerian prostitutes, took part in a silent march. They called for better police protection and rights for the sector.

== Justice ==
On 20 June 2018, police, using CCTV and fingerprint evidence, arrested a 17-year-old youth on a charge of murder. Named as S.G. in the media, the youth at first denied any involvement in the killing but later, in April 2019, confessed. He said he had taken cannabis and cocaine on the day of murder and had lost control after a failed sexual encounter and a dispute about payment.

S.G. went on trial before a jury in Brussels in January 2022. The prosecution sought a sentence of 25 years imprisonment, while recognising two attenuating circumstances, namely the fact that he was a minor at the time of the crime and the fact that as a child he had been subjected to violence by his father. The defence argued that a sentence of 15 years would allow his conditional release after five years and see that he did not progress from a youth detention centre to the corrupting influence of prison. The judges sentenced S.G. to 25 years imprisonment, describing his actions as senseless and an "intolerable violation of respect for human life".

In January 2021, four people involved in the trafficking of Osayande were sentenced to up to four years imprisonment.

== Memorial ==
In September 2021, the City of Brussels announced that it would name a street after Osayande, saying that it wished to draw attention to "forgotten women who are victims of human trafficking, sexual violence and femicides". The council, as part of an initiative to make public spaces more inclusive, had already named a number of streets after notable women but it was the first time a street had been named after a sex worker. City of Brussels deputy Ans Persoons said: "Feminism for us is not just about women who excel. Inclusive feminism is about women's rights and struggles at every social rank."

The Rue Eunice N. Osayande/Eunice N. Osayandestraat was inaugurated on 16 June 2023. The street is situated in a new development off the Quai des Péniches/Akenkaai in the Brussels Canal area. The inauguration was attended by dozens of people.
