= Rue d'Aerschot =

Street in Schaerbeek, Belgium

Rue d'Aerschot (French); Aarschotstraat (Dutch)
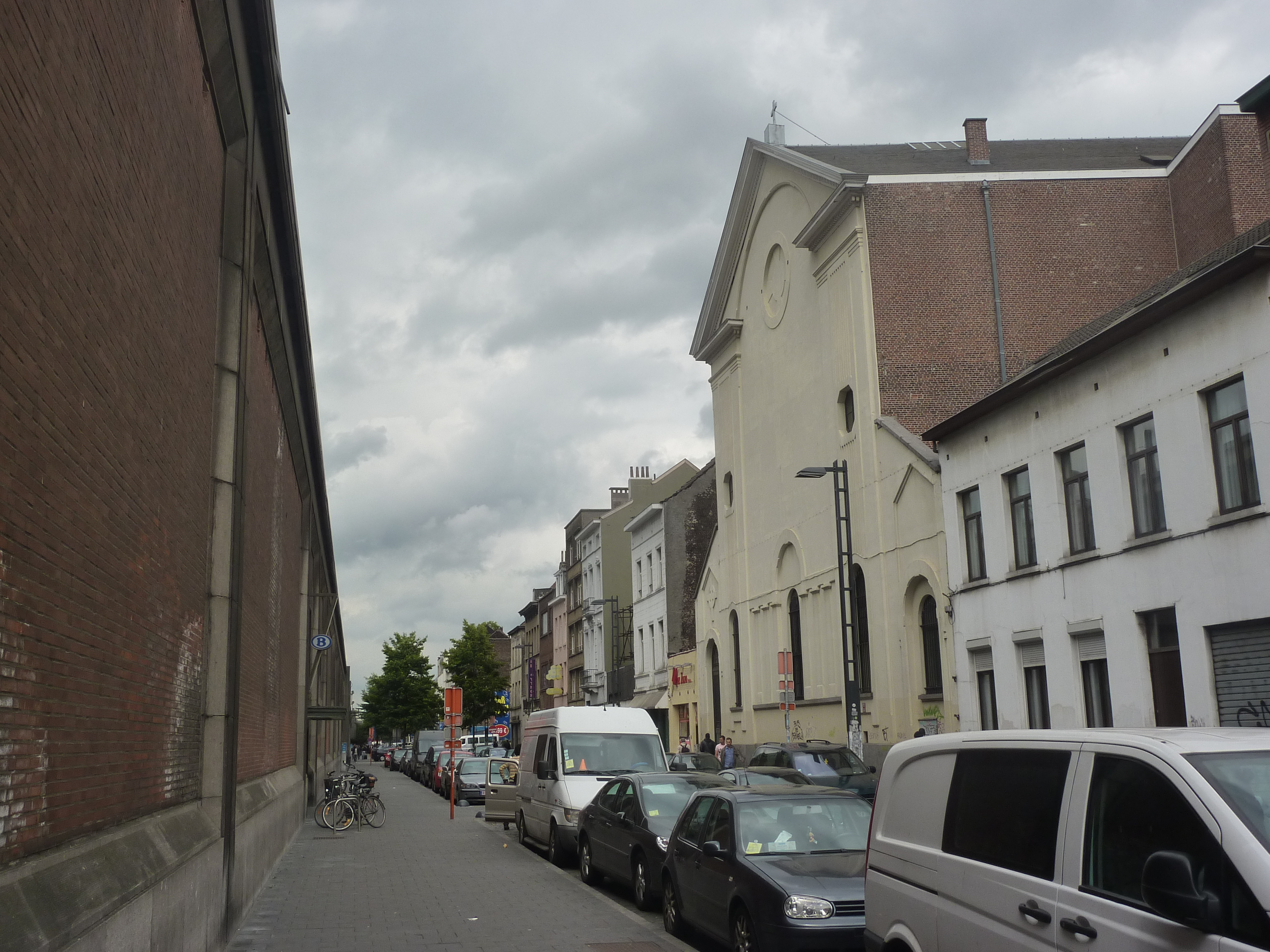
- Rear of the Church of St. John and St. Nicholas on the Rue d'Aerschot/Aarschotstraat

- Location within Brussels Location within Belgium
- Former names: Rue de Cologne (French); Keulenstraat (Dutch)
- Namesake: Aarschot
- Type: Street
- Location: Schaerbeek, Brussels-Capital Region, Belgium
- Postal code: 1030
- Coordinates: 50°51′46″N 4°21′49″E

Construction
- Construction start: c. 1839

Other
- Known for: Brussels-North railway station Window prostitution

The Rue d'Aerschot (French, pronounced [ʁy daʁskɔt]) or Aarschotstraat (Dutch, pronounced [ˈaːrsxɔtˌstraːt]) is a street in the Schaerbeek municipality of Brussels, Belgium. It is known as a hotspot of the city's underground nightlife and famous for its brothels. The street is also known for its inexpensive lodging.

The Rue d'Aerschot is close to Brussels' city centre, and is adjacent to the Northern Quarter business district (also called Little Manhattan), where the World Trade Center (WTC) is located. The street is located on the edge of the Brabant Quarter, and next to Brussels-North railway station, one of the city's three main train stations. The station's buildings and tracks occupy the whole western side of the street. The rear entrance of the neoclassical Church of St. John and St. Nicholas is also located on the street.

== History ==
The Rue d'Aerschot was laid out around 1839 when Brussels-North railway station on the Place Charles Rogier/Karel Rogierplein was constructed and the surrounding streets developed. The station was originally called Cologne railway station (French: Gare de Cologne, Dutch: Keulenstation), and the street the Rue de Cologne/Keulenstraat ("Cologne Street").

After World War I, due to strong anti-German sentiment in Belgium, many streets that were named after German towns or cities were renamed. The street was thus renamed the Rue d'Aerschot/Aarschotstraat ("Aarschot Street") after the town in Brabant, which had suffered heavily in the conflict.

The North Station was rebuilt in 1953 a few hundred metres further north. Following the 1958 Brussels World's Fair (Expo 58), a major plan was devised to rebuild the Northern Quarter – the so-called Manhattan Project (not to be confused with the World War II project of the same name). Work started to the west of the station, including the World Trade Center (WTC), in the 1960s. Bankruptcy in the early 1970s prevented the implementation of the scheme to the east of the station, including the Rue d'Aerschot.

== Prostitution ==
Prostitution in the Rue d'Aerschot is known to have existed before World War I. In modern times, it has become the main red-light district in Brussels and has many "windows" that scantily dressed prostitutes sit in trying to attract trade. Most of the girls are Romanian or Bulgarian.

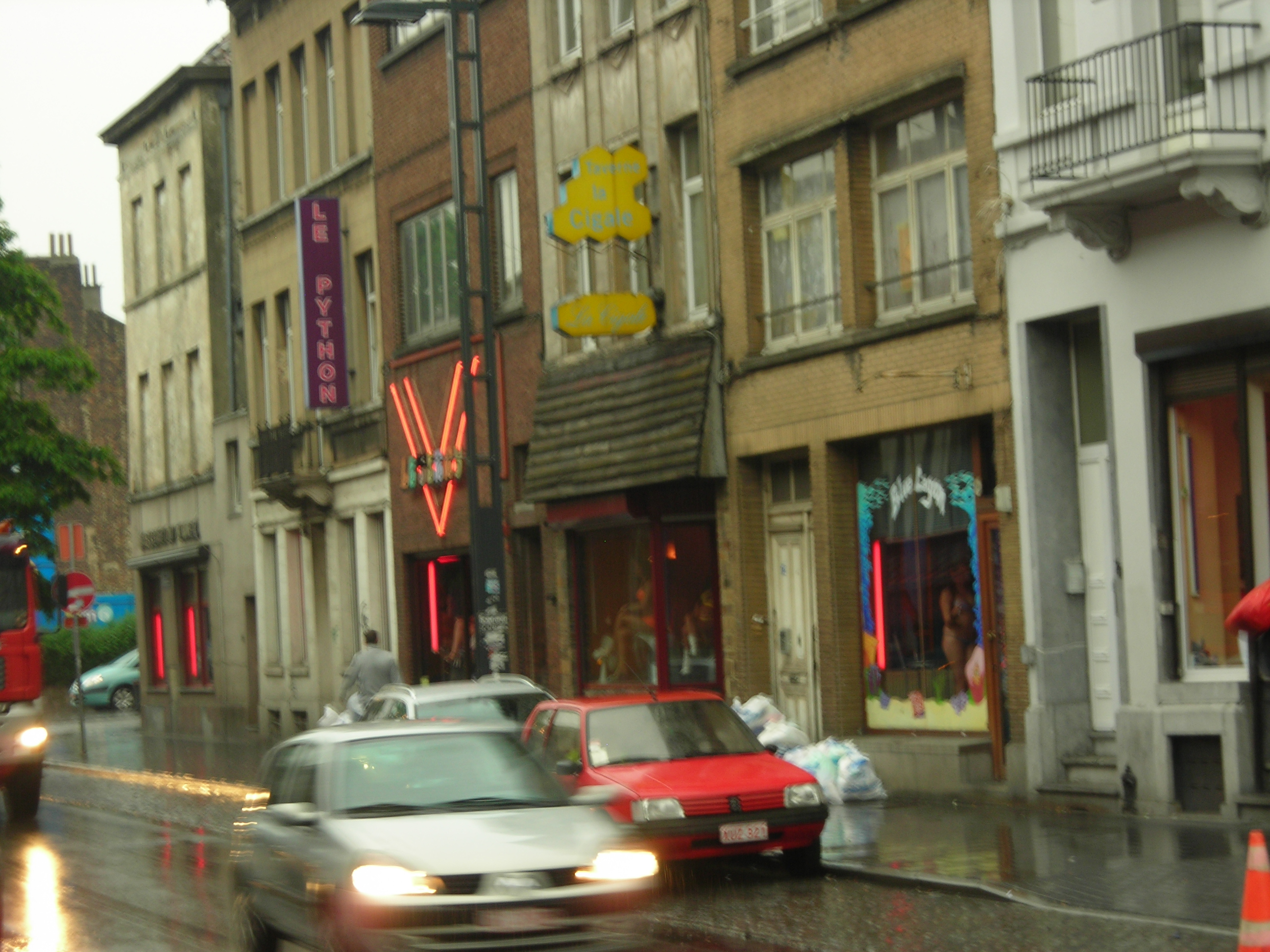
A portion of the street, with red lights and prostitutes visible

In the 1990s, the area was controlled by Albanian pimps. There was often violence between rival pimps and girls complained to the police that the pimps were abusing and exploiting them. There was a crackdown and the criminal networks were broken down.

The area is now controlled by Romanian and Bulgarian pimps. Each window has a madam who controls the prostitutes that work there. The madam takes 50% of the prostitute's earnings. Madams were traditionally older Belgian prostitutes, but these have been replaced with mainly Bulgarian women who work for the pimps. This allows the pimps to stay out of the area and away from police attention. Often they remain in their home country.

Although widely tolerated by police and local authorities, this neighbourhood has at times been a target of joint government and police efforts to track down human trafficking operations, and have been mostly aimed at breaking up criminal networks that lure young women from Central and Eastern European countries with the promise of a better life in Western Europe.

Non-profit associations also operate in the area, mainly women's groups providing support and counseling to prostitutes.

== See also ==
- List of streets in Brussels
- History of Brussels
- Prostitution in Belgium
- Red-light districts in Belgium
- Belgium in the long nineteenth century
