= Urmila Bhoola =

South African human rights lawyer

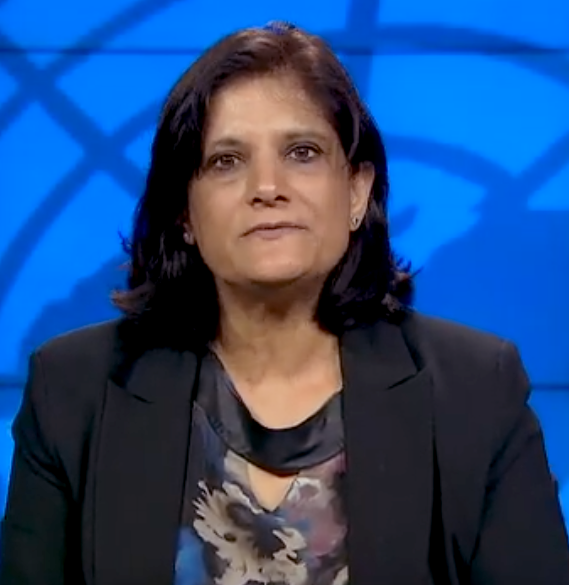
- In a UNOHCHR video in 2018
- Born: Bhoola
- Citizenship: South Africa
- Occupation: Lawyer
- Employer: High Court of South Africa
- Notable work: human rights child protection labour rights

Urmila Bhoola is a South African international human rights lawyer who has worked on human rights, labour rights, women's rights, child protection, human trafficking, forced labour and ending modern slavery in South Africa, Malaysia, Fiji and the Oceanic islands, Nepal and Geneva.

From 2014 to 2020, she was the United Nations Special Rapporteur on Contemporary Forms of Slavery and has sought to change the perception of governments about what they can do to end modern slavery in their countries. As she was in office, the Open Society Foundations granted $100,000 to the Center for Women's Global Leadership with the purpose of "influencing the UN Special Rapporteur on contemporary forms of slavery, its causes and consequences".

Bhoola has been a judge of the Labour Court of South Africa and was appointed based on her long-standing commitment to human rights and labour rights in South Africa. She relocated to Malaysia with her family in 2013 after becoming disillusioned by the continued inequalities that widened the gap between workers and employers and not being able to change that in her capacity as a judge. As an anti-apartheid activist and lawyer who worked with the human rights law firm, Cheadle Thompson and Haysom, she represented many individuals and unions before the Labour Court to claim rights and protection for workers. She worked in Kuala Lumpur with Shanthi Dairiam, founder of the International Women's Rights Action Watch for the Asia Pacific. She speaks at various international forums including the Human Rights Council and has presented papers at human rights conferences around the world.
