= Window prostitution =

Showcase for prostitutes

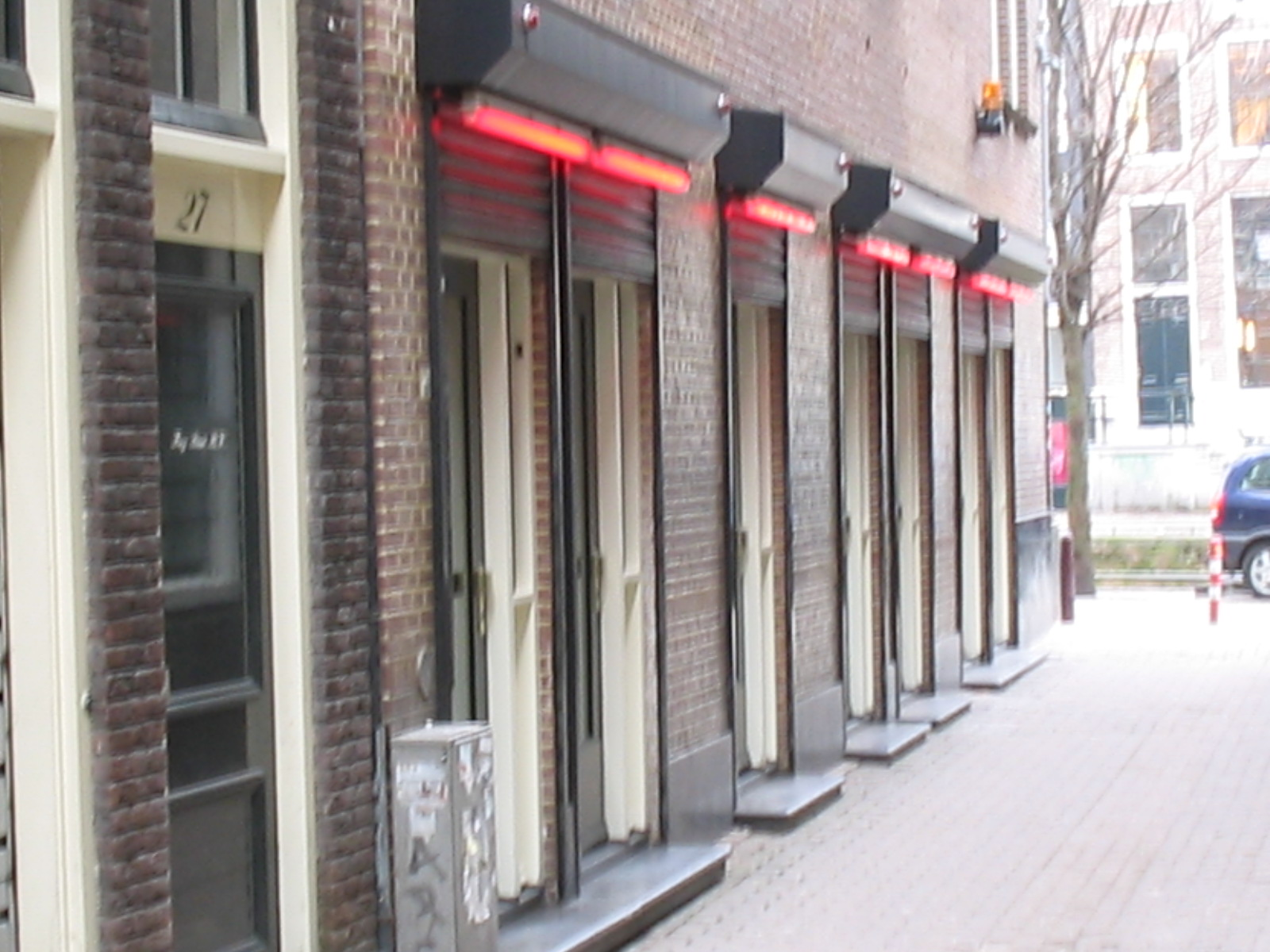
Windows with red lamps in the red-light district of Amsterdam

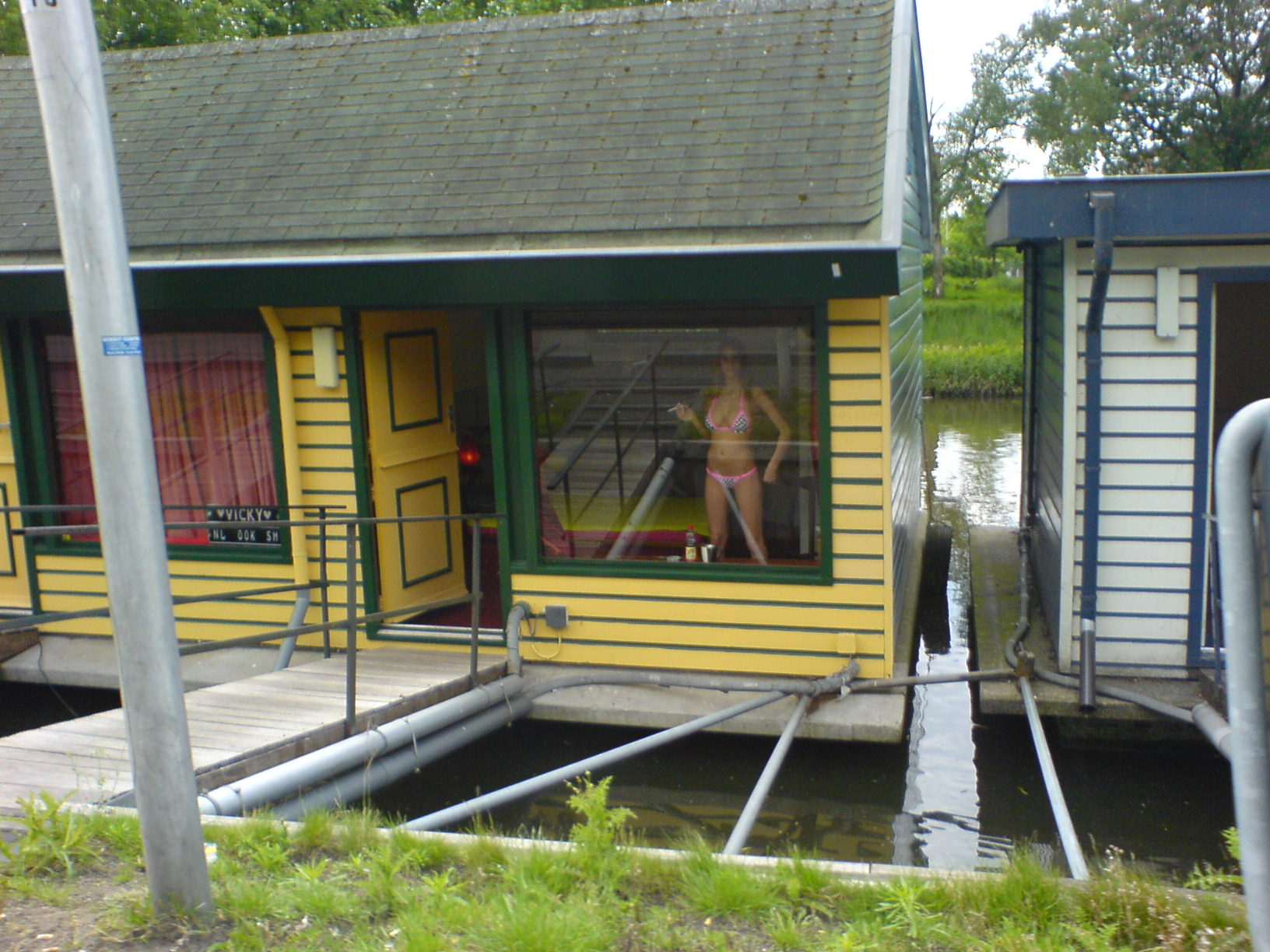
Boat based window prostitute in Utrecht

Window prostitution is a form of prostitution that is fairly common in the Netherlands and surrounding countries. The prostitute rents a window plus workspace off a window operator for a certain period of time, often per day or part of a day. The prostitute is also independent and recruits her own customers and also negotiates the price and the services to be provided.

== Dutch practices ==
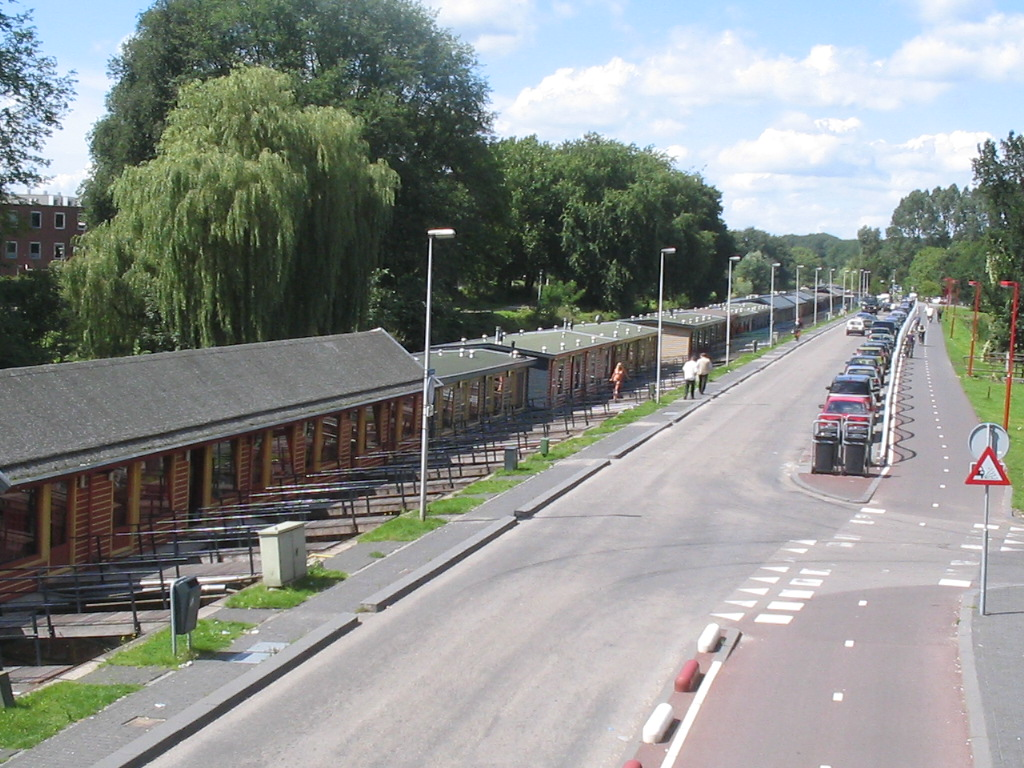
Window prostitution in Utrecht took place on houseboats on the Vecht until they were shut down by the city council.

Window prostitution was originally a typical Dutch form of prostitution. This form arose through the ban on soliciting on the street or in doorways in the old red-light district in Amsterdam around the old church. In the beginning the curtains were completely closed; as sexual morality became less strict, the curtains opened even further. When the curtains were completely open, the process continued in the form of fewer and fewer pieces of clothing that the prostitute wore. In current times, the curtains are only closed when the prostitute has a customer.

There are around 1,270 windows used for prostitution in the Netherlands. In Amsterdam, the traditional window prostitution neighbourhoods are the red-light district, the area around the Singel and the Ruysdaelkade. In Rotterdam, window prostitution has not been tolerated since the 1970s. In The Hague, it occurs in the Hunsestraat, the Geleenstraat and the Doubletstraat. In Alkmaar, there is a tolerance area for windows on the Achterdam. In Arnhem, the Spijkerkwartier was the red-light district, but it was closed in January 2006. In Utrecht, there was a special form of window prostitution from the 1960s: the women were sitting behind the windows of houseboats moored along the Zandpad, a road along the eastern bank of the Vecht river. In July 2013, the municipal authorities withdrew the permits.

Thirty percent of prostitutes in the Netherlands work behind windows.

== List of cities with window prostitution ==
=== Netherlands ===
- Alkmaar - Achterdam
- Amsterdam - De Wallen, Singel, Ruysdaelkade
- The Hague - Geleenstraat & Hunsestraat
- Deventer - Bokkingshang
- Doetinchem - Roerstraat
- Eindhoven - Edisonstraat/Baekelandplein
- Groningen - Groningen red-light district
- Haarlem - Haarlem red-light district
- Heerenveen - Munnikstraat
- Leeuwarden - Leeuwarden red light district
- Nijmegen - New Market

Former:

- Arnhem - window prostitution until 2006
- Rotterdam - window prostitution until 1981
- Utrecht - window prostitution until 2013

=== Belgium ===
- Antwerp - Schipperskwartier
- Brussels - Aarschotstraat (North Station)
- Ghent - "The Glass Street" (Pieter Vanderdoncktdoorgang)
- Ostend - "Hazegras", near Ostend Station
- Charleroi
- Deinze - Kortrijksesteenweg
- Liège
- Sint-Truiden - "Chaussée d'Amour" (Luikersteenweg)

And on many through roads outside built-up areas, for example on the road from Deinze to Sint-Martens-Latem, there are about 60 windows

=== Germany ===
- Aachen (Antoniusstraße)
- Bochum - Im Winkel
- Braunschweig - Bruchstraße
- Dortmund - Linienstraße
- Duisburg - Vulkanstraße
- Düsseldorf - Industriestraße
- Essen - Stahlstraße
- Frankfurt - Bahnhofsviertel
- Hamburg - Reeperbahn, Herbertstraße
- Karlsruhe - Brunnenstraße
- Mannheim - Lupinestraße
- Nürnberg - Frauentormauer
- Oberhausen - Flaßhofstraße

Duisburg, Cologne and Frankfurt am Main contain Eroscenters or Laufhäuser where the women work within a building behind a window, often large buildings of more than 6 floors. Both forms are present in Hamburg.

=== Switzerland ===
- Zurich - window prostitution until 2003
- Geneva - Les Pâquis, Pâquis’ four sex centres - the only places in Geneva where the women sit behind windows

=== South Korea ===
- Cheongnyangni 588, Seoul - Windows were fitted in the red-light district in a government-backed improvement scheme ahead of the 1988 Summer Olympics. The district was closed for re-development in 2016.
