= Aachen Town Hall =

City hall in Aachen, Germany

- Rathaus Aachen
- South side of the town hall in September 2026

General information
- Type: City hall
- Architectural style: Gothic style
- Location: Aachen, Germany
- Coordinates: 50.7761°N 6.0838°E
- Construction started: 1330
- Completed: 1349

Aachen Town Hall (German: Rathaus Aachen) is a municipal building in Aachen in western Germany, standing between the Marktplatz and the Katschhof. It was designed in the Gothic style and completed in the mid-14th century.

== History ==
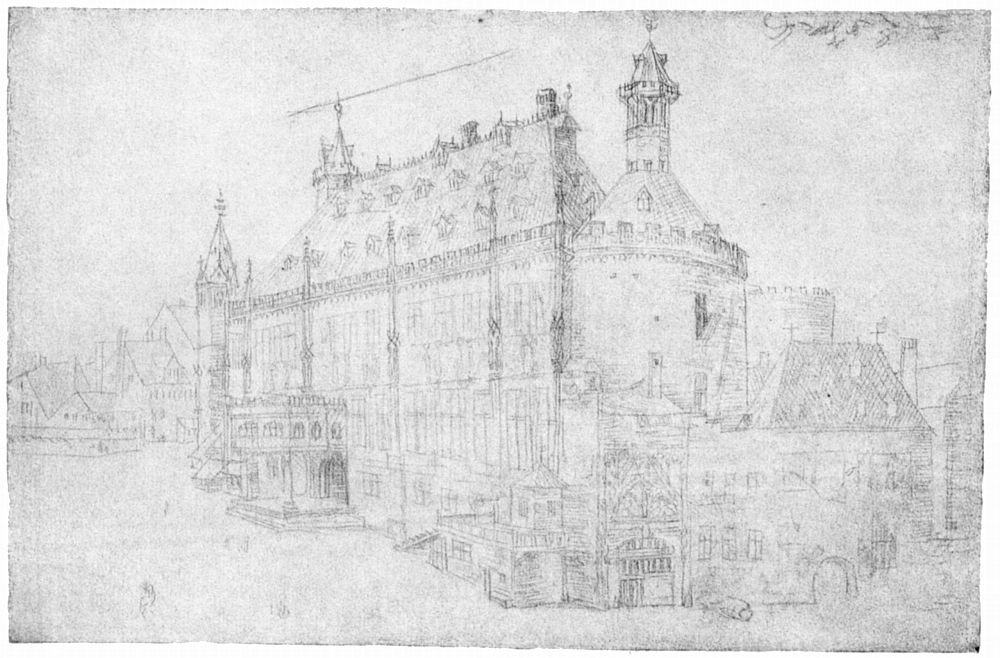
Drawing by Albrecht Dürer in 1520

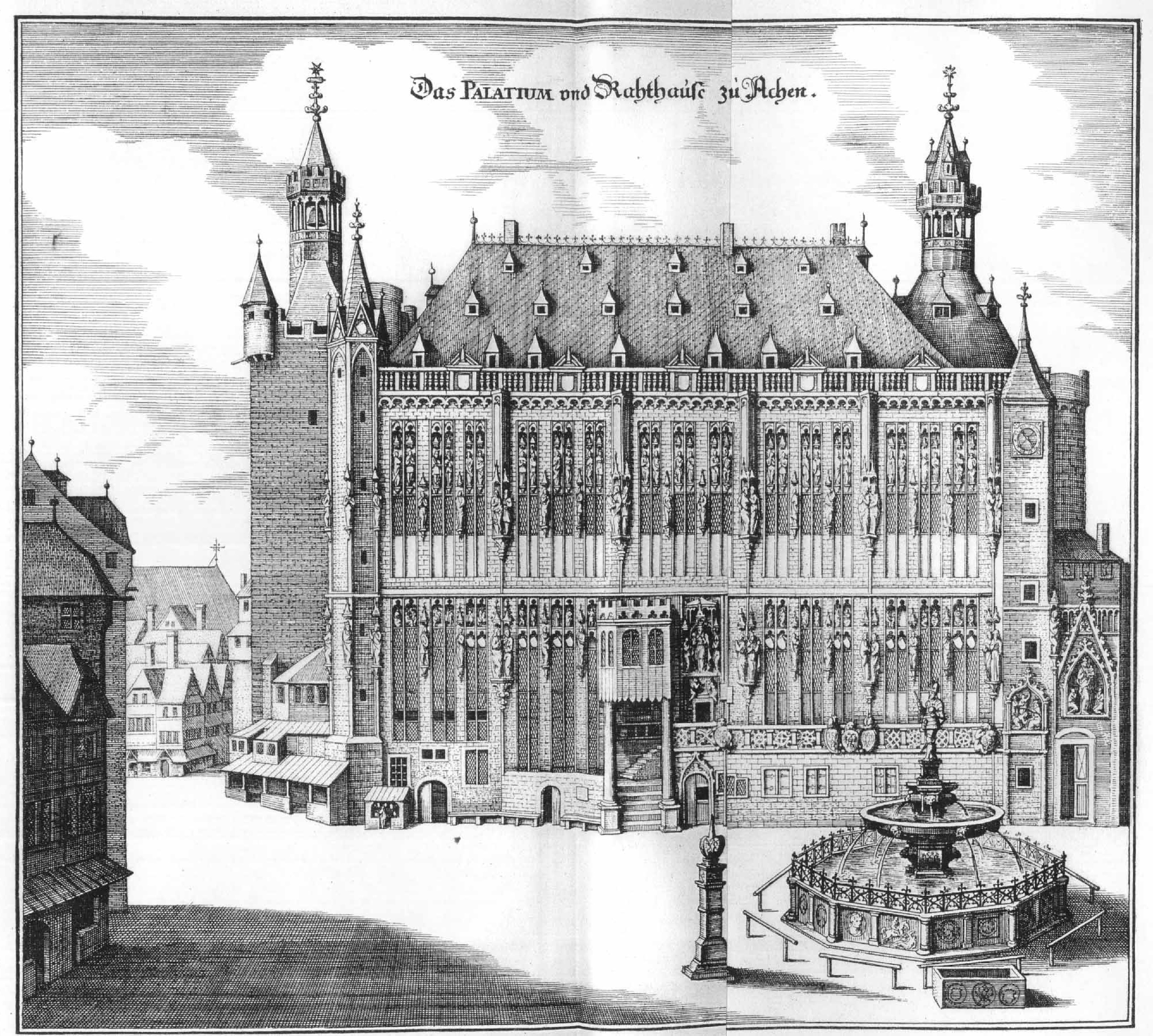
Engraving by Matthäus Merian in 1647

=== Early history ===
Aachen Town Hall was commissioned under the leadership of the mayor Gerhard Chorus (1285–1367). The new hall also hosted the traditional coronation feast that was part of the coronation ceremony of the Holy Roman Empire. Before that, the coronation was held at the nearby mid-13th century Grashaus which is one of the city’s oldest still-standing buildings. Construction began in 1330 on top of the foundation walls of the Aula Regia, part of the derelict Palace of Aachen, built during the Carolingian dynasty. Dating from the time of Charlemagne, the Granus Tower and masonry from that era were incorporated into the south side of the building. Part of the city's collection of munitions and weaponry was housed in the Granus Tower. The town hall, which served as the administrative centre of the city, was completed in 1349.

=== Three Kings relief ===
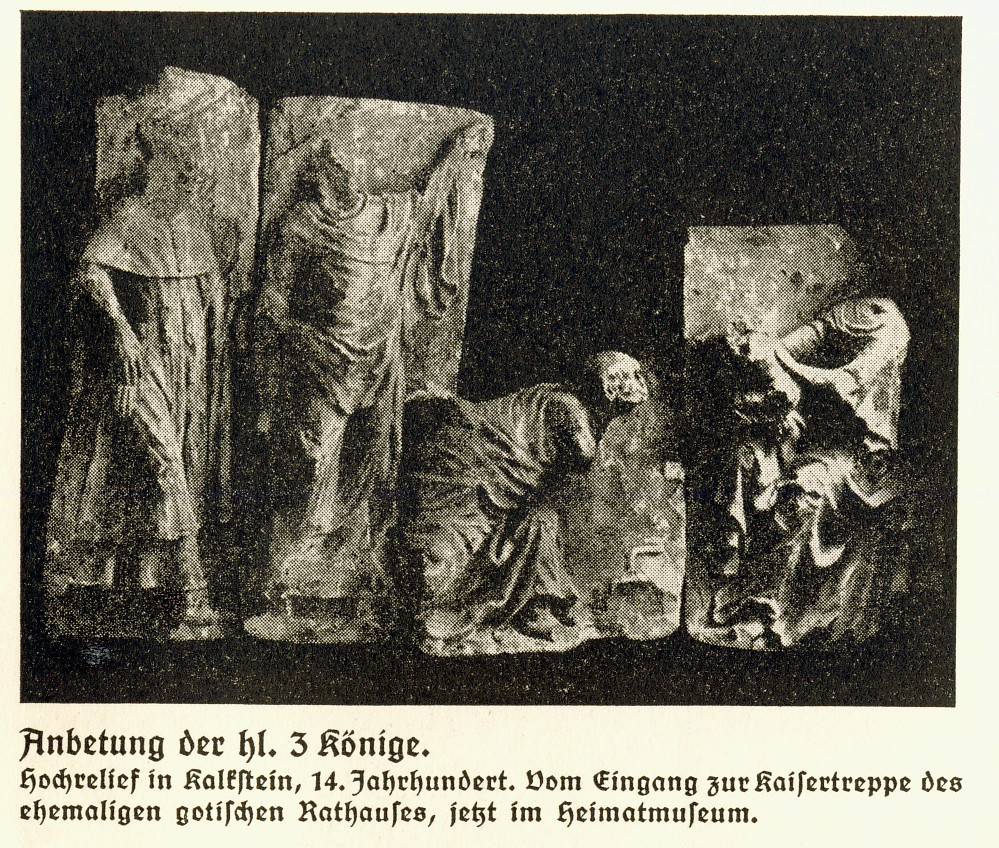
Torsos of the Three Kings relief, from the 14th century

Since 1380, the entrance of "Emperor's stairs" (Kaisertreppe), which connected the subterranean levels to the Coronation Hall, was adorned by the limestone relief of the Three Kings and a depiction of the Adoration of the Magi. Four limestone blocks formed the relief, with one serving for each king, and the last depicting Mary and Jesus. In 1798, during the French period, the relief was partially destroyed, and the remaining pieces were left as they were above the entrance to the main guard station.

=== Baroque ===
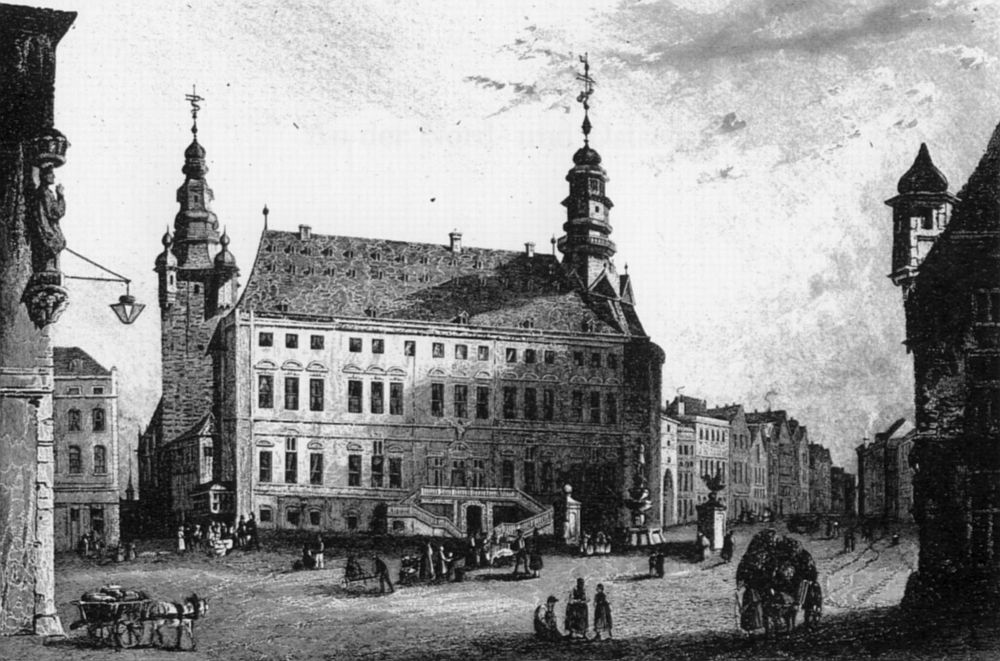
The baroque city hall and the Aachen market, steel engraving by Henry Winkles around 1840

During the Great Fire of Aachen in 1656, portions of the roof and towers burned. The destroyed elements were then replaced in a baroque style. From 1727 to 1732 the Chief Architect of Aachen, Johann Joseph Couven, led a fundamental baroque remodelling of the structure, especially of the front façade and entry steps. The gothic figures and muntin adorning the windows were removed, and even the interior was remodelled in the baroque style.

At the treaty signing ceremony that ended the War of Austrian Succession in 1748, the "Peace Hall" was set up but was not used because of a dispute between the envoys. As a compensation, the city obtained portraits of the envoys, which are present in the various spaces of the building.

=== 19th century ===
Since the end of the imperial city era and the Napoleonic occupation of the area, the structural condition of the Aachen Town Hall was neglected and the building was seen to be falling apart by 1840. Under the guidance and patronage of the 19th century Chief Architect Friedrich Joseph Ark, the building was rebuilt in a neogothic style preserving its original Gothic elements. The side of the building that faced the Market was adorned with statues of 50 kings, as well as symbols of art, science, and Christianity. The Coronation Hall was also restored and a new entrance was constructed. In addition, the painter Alfred Rethel had the task to embellish the room with a large series of frescoes. Begun in 1847 and completed by his student in 1861, the frescoes eventually depicted legends from the life of Charlemagne.

=== The fire, 1883 ===
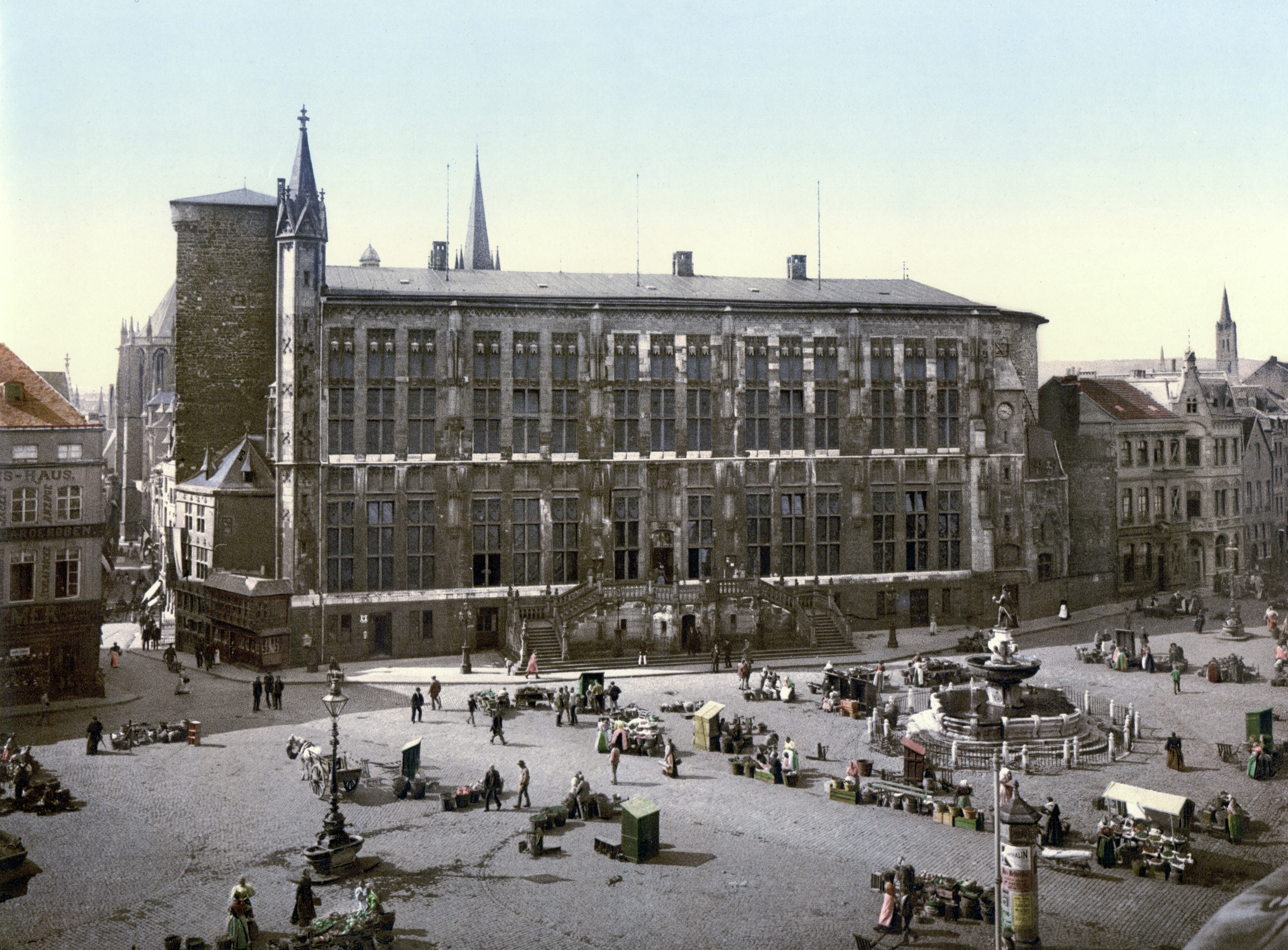
Seventeen years after the fire of 1883

Starting from a fire in the Johann Peter Joseph Monheim Drug and Material Warehouse at 26 Antonius Street (Antoniusstraße), flames first spread when cinder from the roof landed on the Granus Tower and set it ablaze. Within four hours the roof and both towers of Aachen Town Hall were aflame, as were a large number of surrounding houses on the south side of the Market. Within the building, the Coronation Hall with its frescoes by Alfred Rethel, as well as the building's first floor, was spared. In the time immediately following the fire, its roof and towers were kept erect through makeshift structures of support.

On 1 November 1884, the city of Aachen started a contest among German architects for the purpose of rebuilding Aachen Town Hall. Out the 13 submitted draft designs, the first prize went to Aachen architect Georg Frentzen, who in 1891 was commissioned to rebuild the building and its towers. The restoration of the inner rooms was performed under the leadership of Joseph Laurent. In 1895, the sculptures depicting the Knight Gerhard Chorus and Johann von Punt (Aachen's mayor from 1372 to 1385) were reinstalled in the bay windows on the back side of Aachen Town Hall while the eight shields depicting the coat of arms of medieval nobility (Margarten, Berensberg, Roide, Hasselholz, Surse, Wilde, Joh Chorus, and Zevel) were remade in the spandrels. The work was accomplished by Karl Krauß. The restoration took 18 years to complete (finished in 1902) after which the unveiling of the building took place in the presence of Kaiser Wilhelm II, Emperor of Germany, on 19 June 1902.

=== 20th century ===
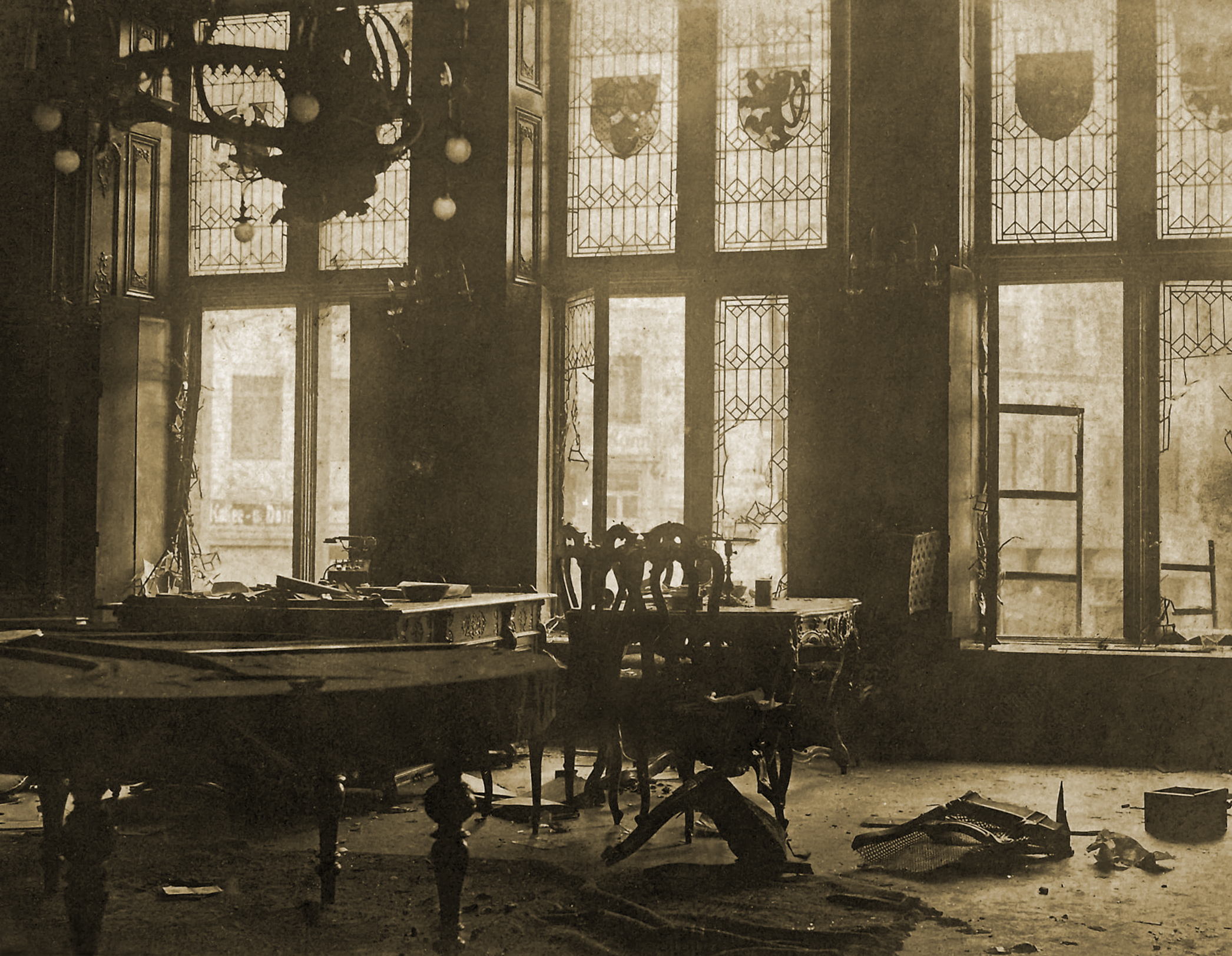
Devastation of the interior of the Aachen Town Hall after its storming by separatists on 21 October 1923

Aachen Town Hall survived the First World War without sustaining damage, but during the civil unrest in the Rhenish Republic period, the building was stormed by a group of separatists who caused serious damage both to its interior and exterior.

During the Second World War, Aachen Town Hall was heavily damaged by bombing raids, especially those occurring on 14 July 1943 and 11 April 1944. On 14 July 1943, the roof of the building and both towers burned, and afterwards the structure retained a distinctive shape due to the heat that twisted the steel skeletons inside the tower caps. The Coronation Hall was also heavily damaged and the north facing wall was moved in places up to 30 centimeters vertically. The imminent threat of collapse was staved off using emergency beams that held the structure in place. Because of rain penetrating the interior of the building as well its frescoes were severely affected. Five of the eight frescoes were removed by Franz Stiewi and stored at the Suermondt-Ludwig-Museum.

In 1945, the architect Otto Gruber and the engineer Richard Stumpf prepared a report on the structural integrity of the building. With the help of Professor Josef Pirlet, the dilapidated north façade was reinforced with steel and tension bars, and in 1946, the building's roof was repaired by using makeshift sheets of zinc. After structural analysis was conducted and the foreground reinforced, the replacement of the north façade took place (since almost all of the arches there were broken). The arches on the ground floor were again closed for repairs in 1950, and the reconstruction of the Emperor Hall was largely completed by 1953, with the configuration of the room following in the next few years. The question of how the tower caps should be rebuilt remained at the heart of a controversial discussion. In 1966 Professor Wilhelm K. Fischer, who greatly contributed to the reconstruction of Aachen, wrote a draft for the towers’ design. The students from RWTH Aachen University also took part in the debate, submitting 24 designs for consideration. In 1968 eight additional expert designs were submitted to a working group whose mission was to rebuild the towers and, after discussing several modern samples, the group agreed on a design proposed by the conservation-restoration expert Leo Hugot, who insisted on the historical image of the towers. The tower caps were finally finished in 1979.

=== Present ===
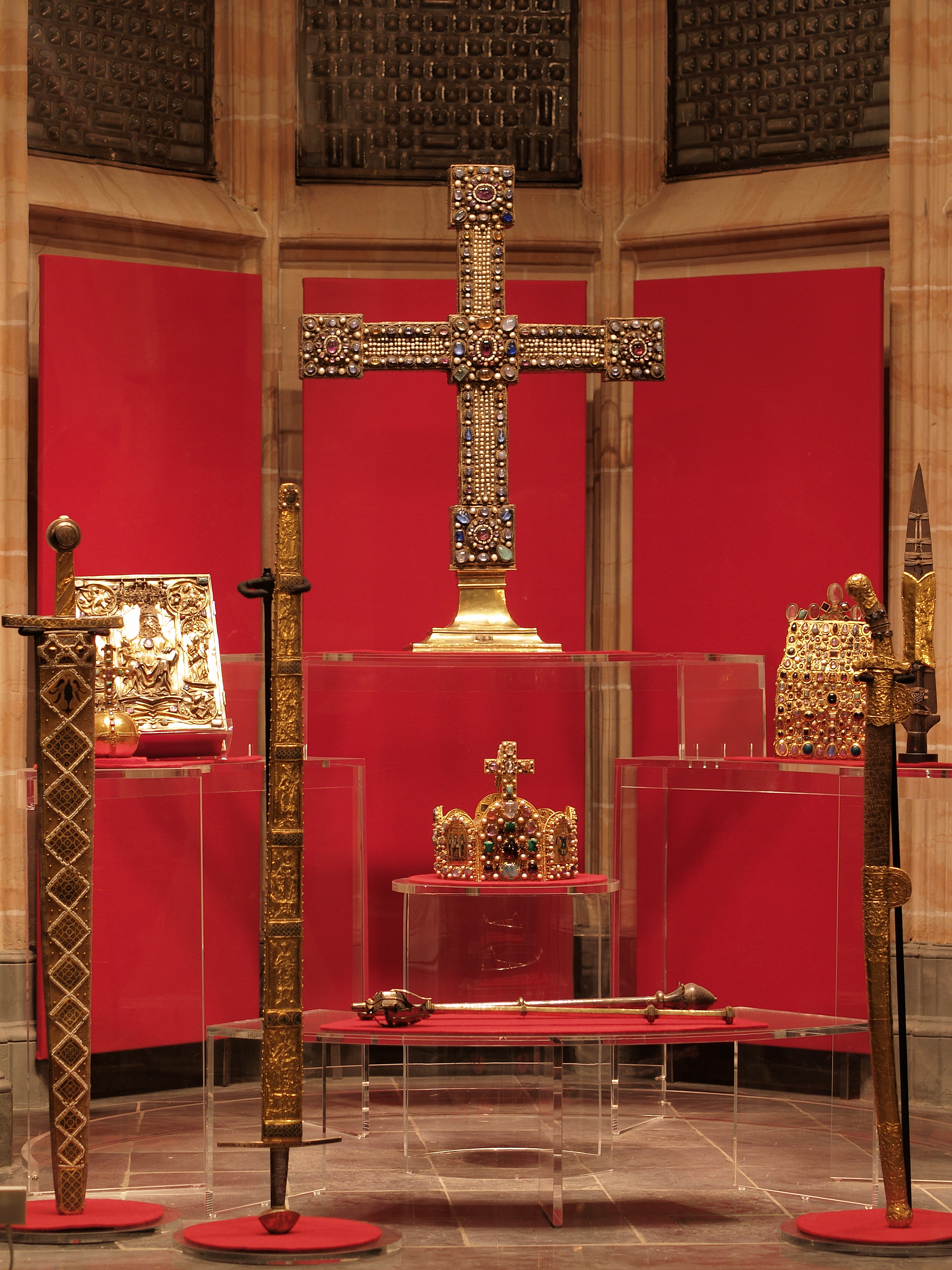
Replicas of the Imperial Regalia

Nowadays, the replicas of the Imperial Regalia from the Viennese Imperial Treasury are located in Aachen Town Hall. The replicas were made around 1915 by order of Emperor Wilhelm II for an exhibition to commemorate 31 coronations that took place in Aachen between 813 and 1531. The replicas include the copy of the Vienna Coronation Gospels, the Sabre of Charlemagne, the Imperial Crown of Otto I, and the Imperial Orb.

Since 2009, Aachen Town Hall has been a part of the Route Charlemagne, a tour program by which historical sights of Aachen are presented to visitors. In the building, a museum exhibition explains the history and art of the building and gives a sense of the historical coronation banquets that took place in the past. Tourists can also see the portrait of Napoleon from 1807 by Louis-André-Gabriel Bouchet and one of his wife Joséphine from 1805 by Robert Lefèvre. Aachen Town Hall is still the residence of the mayor of Aachen and of the city council. The annual Charlemagne Prize is awarded in the building.

== Bibliography ==
- Crous, Helmut A. (1979). Aachen so wie es war 2. Düsseldorf: Droste.
- Grimme, Ernst Günther (1996). Das Rathaus zu Aachen. Aachen: Einhard-Verlag. ISBN 978-3930701155.
- Hermann, Will (1933). Stadt in Ketten. Aachen.
- Hoffmann, Hans (1984). Aachen in Trümmern: Die alte Kaiserstadt im Bombenhagel und danach. Düsseldorf: Droste.
- Kerz, Philipp (1951). Zerstörung und Wiederaufbau des alten Rathauses in Aachen. Düsseldorf: Verein für Heimatpflege und Denkmalschutz. pp. 140–151.
- Kraus, Thomas R. (1984). Zur Geschichte der Aachener Rathausuhr. in: Zeitschrift des Aachener Geschichtsvereins. Aachen: Verlag des Aachener Geschichtsvereins. pp. 69–97.
- Kraus, Thomas R. (2011). Aachen: von den Anfängen bis zur Gegenwart (Beihefte der Zeitschrift des Aachener Geschichtsvereins No. 7–9). Aachen: Stadt Aachen Mayersche Buchhandlung. ISBN 978-3875192513.
- Niehüsener, Wilhelm (1977). Bericht des Arbeitskreises für den Wiederaufbau der Rathaustürme. Aachen: J.A. Mayer.
- Röntgen, Mathilde (1953). Das gotische Rathaus zu Aachen in: Aachener Beiträge für Baugeschichte und Heimatkunst. Das alte Aachen seine Zerstörung und sein Wiederaufbau.. Aachen: Verlag des Aachener Geschichtsvereins. pp. 106–155.
- Rovenhagen, Ludwig (1873). Das Rathaus zu Aachen: ein Führer für Besucher und Legende zu den Freskobildern des Kaisersaales. Aachen: Jacobi.
- Schoenen, Paul (1951). Rethels Karlsfresken und die romantische Historienmalerei. Düsseldorf: Verein für Heimatpflege und Denkmalschutz. pp. 152–165.
- Schoenen, Paul (1964). Johann Joseph Couven. L. Schwann.
