= Louis-André-Gabriel Bouchet =

French painter (1759–1842)

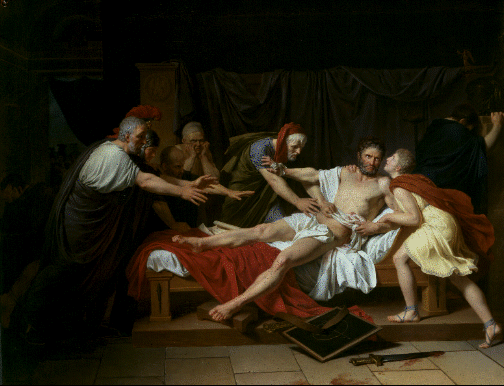
The Death of Cato the Younger, the 1797 painting which won Bouchet the Prix de Rome. Now at the École nationale supérieure des Beaux-Arts in Paris

Louis-André-Gabriel Bouchet (1759 – 7 July 1842) was a French historical painter and a pupil of Jacques-Louis David. He painted subjects from sacred and profane history, poetry, and portraits. He won the Prix de Rome in 1797, and continued to exhibit until 1819. Charles Gabet does not mention the date of his birth or death.

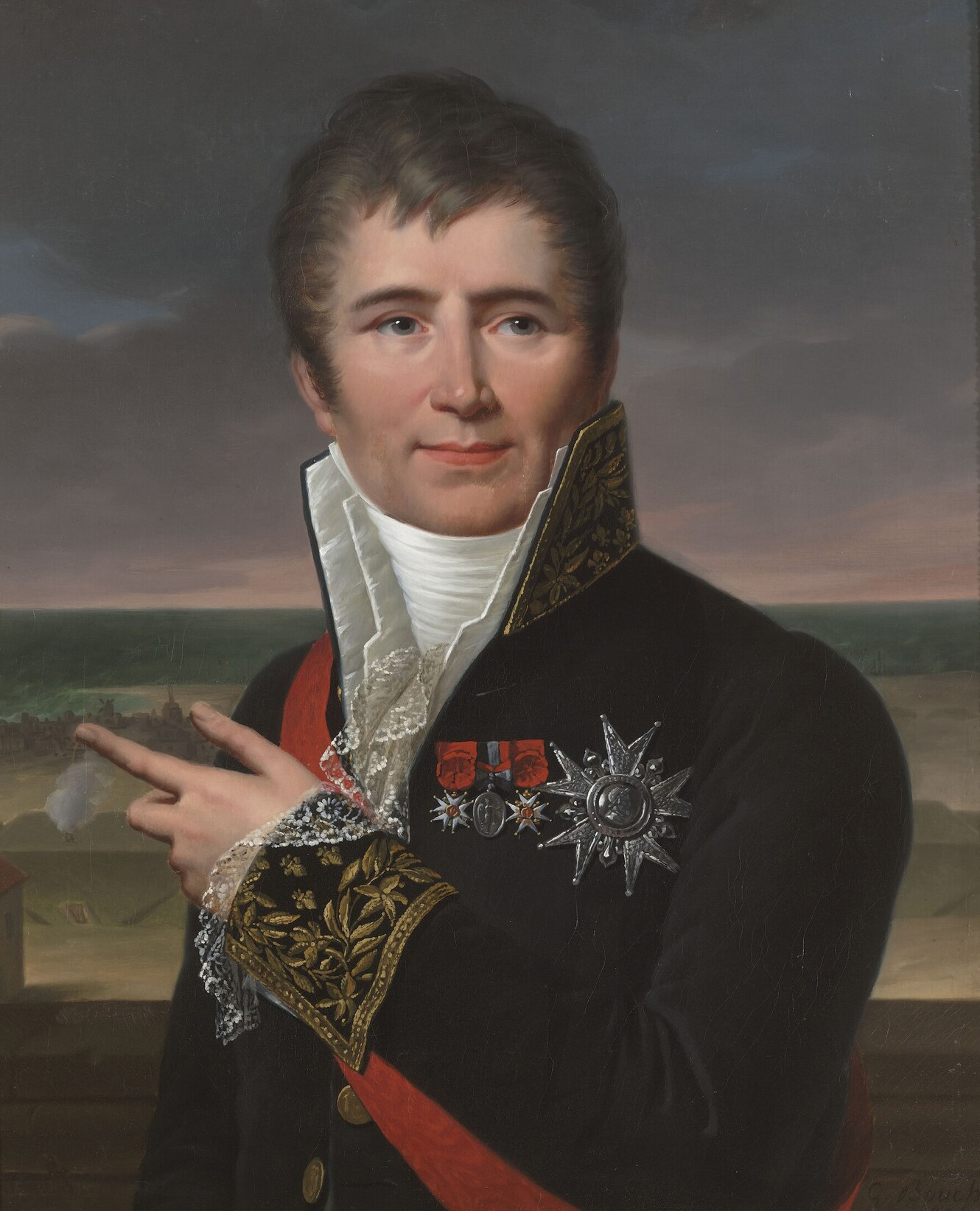
1824 portrait of Carel Hendrik Ver Huell by Bouchet

In 1807, he painted the portrait on behalf the emperor Napoléon as a counterpart to the portrait of Empress Joséphine who Robert Lefèvre 1805 had painted. Napoléon gave these two portraits to the City of Aachen in 1807. The Prussian emperor, Frederick William IV had copies made before he sent the paintings back to Aachen in 1840. Professor Carl Schmid probably painted the reproductions. The original works decorate today the entrance hall of Aachen Town Hall.

== Works ==
- 1797 Death of Marcus Porcius Cato the Younger
- Hector Isabey (1797–1814), sign., oil on canvas, 141 × 98 cm (55,5 × 38,6 in). 1994 auction.
- Eugenie Isabey (1803–1886), oil on canvas, 141 × 98 cm (55,5 × 38,6 in). 1994 auction.
- Alexandrine Isabey (1791–1871), Madame Charles Ciceri, sign., oil on canvas, 141 × 98 cm (55,5 × 38,6 in). 1994 auction.
- Mme. H and her children, 1815, oil on canvas, 165.4 × 122.6 cm (65 1/8 × 48 1/4 in). Eugene Fuller Memorial Collection, 62.75 Seattle Art Museum The Collection Holocaust Provenance.

== Bibliography ==
- J. Fey: "Zur Geschichte Aachener Maler des 19. Jahrhunderts." in: "Aus Aachens Vorzeit. Mit-teilungen des Vereins für Kunde der Aachener Vorzeit." Zehnter Jahrgang 1897, Nr. 4/8. S. 70–72. Kurzbiografie von Schmid. S.83f.
- "BOUCHET, Louis André Gabriel" in Bryan's Dictionary of Painters and Engravers by Michael Bryan, edited by Robert Edmund Graves and Sir Walter Armstrong, an 1889 publication now in the public domain.
