= Achterdam =

Street in Alkmaar, the Netherlands

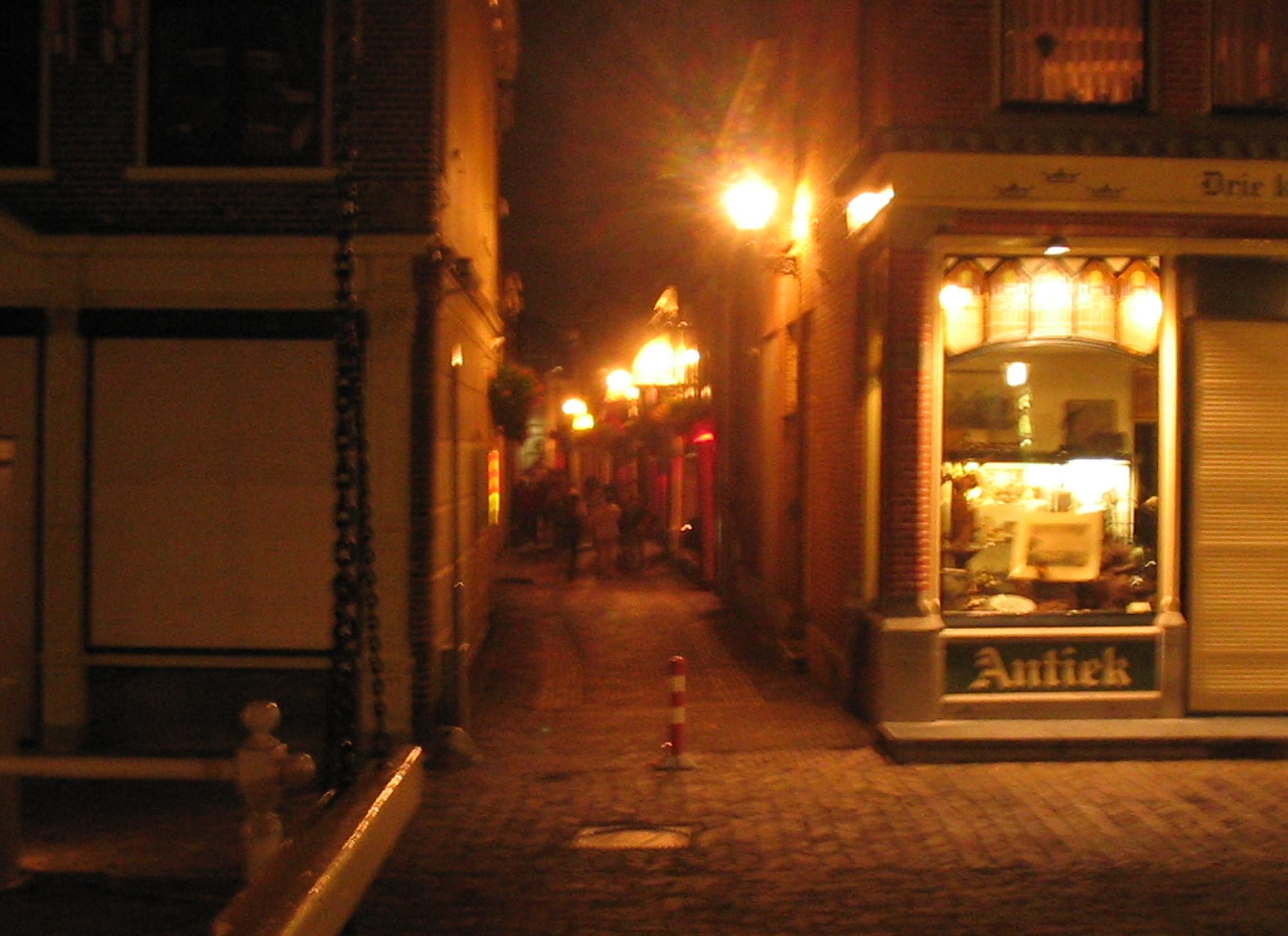
- Achterdam by night
- Interactive map of Achterdam
- Length: 150 m (490 ft)
- Location: Alkmaar, The Netherlands
- Coordinates: 52°37′53″N 4°45′7″E

Other
- Known for: Window Prostitution
- Website: achterdam.nl

The Achterdam is a red light district in the Dutch city of Alkmaar, 30 km North of Amsterdam. It is the only place in Alkmaar where window prostitution is permitted. Achterdam is situated about 10 minutes walk from the Alkmaar train station. It is a 150-metre-long street with window prostitution on both sides. The area has about 69 windows with rooms.

== Windows ==
There are about 69 windows with rooms in the district, rented individually by the prostitutes.

The windows are all privately owned and the street is administered under the guidance of the Municipal government and police. There is a private security service and security cameras for safety.

In order to prevent exploitation and trafficking a number of measures are in place:

- Owners of the windows can have no financial involvement with the tenants
- Prostitutes must be over 21 years of age and have identity papers, be registered with the municipality of Alkmaar (GBA) and the Chamber of Commerce (KvK), as well as health insurance.
- Prostitutes have to be interviewed and there is an in-depth check on their identity papers before they are allowed to rent a window
- Third parties may not rent windows on behalf of the prostitutes

The rent for the room includes cleaning, maintenance, towels, bed linen and wi-fi.

Opening hours are from 09:00 to 01:00.

The prostitutes are all members of the Association of Achterdam and are visited weekly by support workers from Aanloophuis De Steiger. Medical check-ups are available on alternate Tuesdays

== History and municipal policy ==
Prostitution has been practiced in Alkmaar for at least two centuries. In 1811, the French government (Alkmaar was part of the French Empire at this time) set regulations for "huizen van ontucht" in Alkmaar. This was one of the first cities with rules for prostitution.

In 1991, the city council adopted a policy paper Prostitutie en overige sexinrichtingen vast ("Prostitution and other sex institutions"). It was intended to be model European prototype. The Achterdam window prostitution it proposed was first operational in 1973.

Following the October 2000 abolition of the law banning brothels, sex establishments in Alkmaar, such as the houses on the Achterdam, have been allowed provided they have a license from the municipal council. In the 2000s there were between 120 and 125 prostitution windows operating in Achterdam.

From May 2001, prostitutes needed full EU passports or EU residence permits to work in Achterdam. As a result, Bulgarian and Romanian women could no longer work in Achterdam. This left a number of empty windows which were filled by other East Europeans, Latin American women and (older) Dutch sex workers.

During the 2000s there were complaints about the alleged nuisance resulting from prostitution in Achterdam. This led to the windows having to close by 1am.

In 2004 and again in 2015, the window operators held an "open day" during which members of the public could tour the premises and speak to the prostitutes.

In 2007 licenses were revoked for brothels alleged to be involved in money laundering.

Following changes in licensing rules in 2011 the number of prostitution windows was limited to a maximum of 69.

In 2012 the Central Alkmaar Residents' Association campaigned for the end of all window prostitution in Achterdam, while the window operators proposed an end to the 69-window limit.

There have been anti-trafficking raids at various times. The biggest was in March 2013 when more than 500 employees of the Municipality of Alkmaar, Public Prosecutor's Office and the police were involved in the raid. All prostitutes, window owners and anybody in the street at the time were arrested and questioned.

== Criminality ==
Two prostitutes were murdered in Achterdam in 1996. One of the murderers was identified from CCTV but fled the country. The second murderer was never identified.

In 2007, 92 of the windows were run by Koos Nool, who also owned some of the windows. Others were owned by Cor van Hout, who was involved in the kidnapping of Freddy Heineken. When Nool applied to renew his licenses, Alkmaar Mayor Piet Bruinooge refused the license renewal on the advice of the Bureau BIBOB, on suspicion of money laundering and that the windows had been brought with money from crime. Nool challenged the decision in the Alkmaar Court, which decided there was "insufficient information on the serious risk that the permit would be misused for illegal purposes". On appeal in the Administrative Law Division of the Council of State (ABrVS), based on further information from the Bureau BIBOB, the Court ruled the Mayor had been justified in refusing the permit application.

A number of females of Turkish-German descent were convicted of human trafficking in 2008 (the so-called SNEEP Case). They had been forcing women, mostly from East Europe, to work as prostitutes. The victims were lured to the Netherlands and forced to work in the windows. Some women were forced to undergo breast enlargement surgery and have the traffickers' initials tattooed on their neck.

A Moroccan man was jailed for one year for trafficking a girl to Achterdam in November 2010.

In March 2013 two men, one Hungarian, the other Romanian, were arrested for human trafficking during a raid on Achterdam. In November that year another man was arrested, again for trafficking.

== See also ==
- Prostitution in the Netherlands
- Human trafficking in the Netherlands
