= Linienstraße (Dortmund) =

Street in Dortmund, Germany

Street in Dortmund, Germany
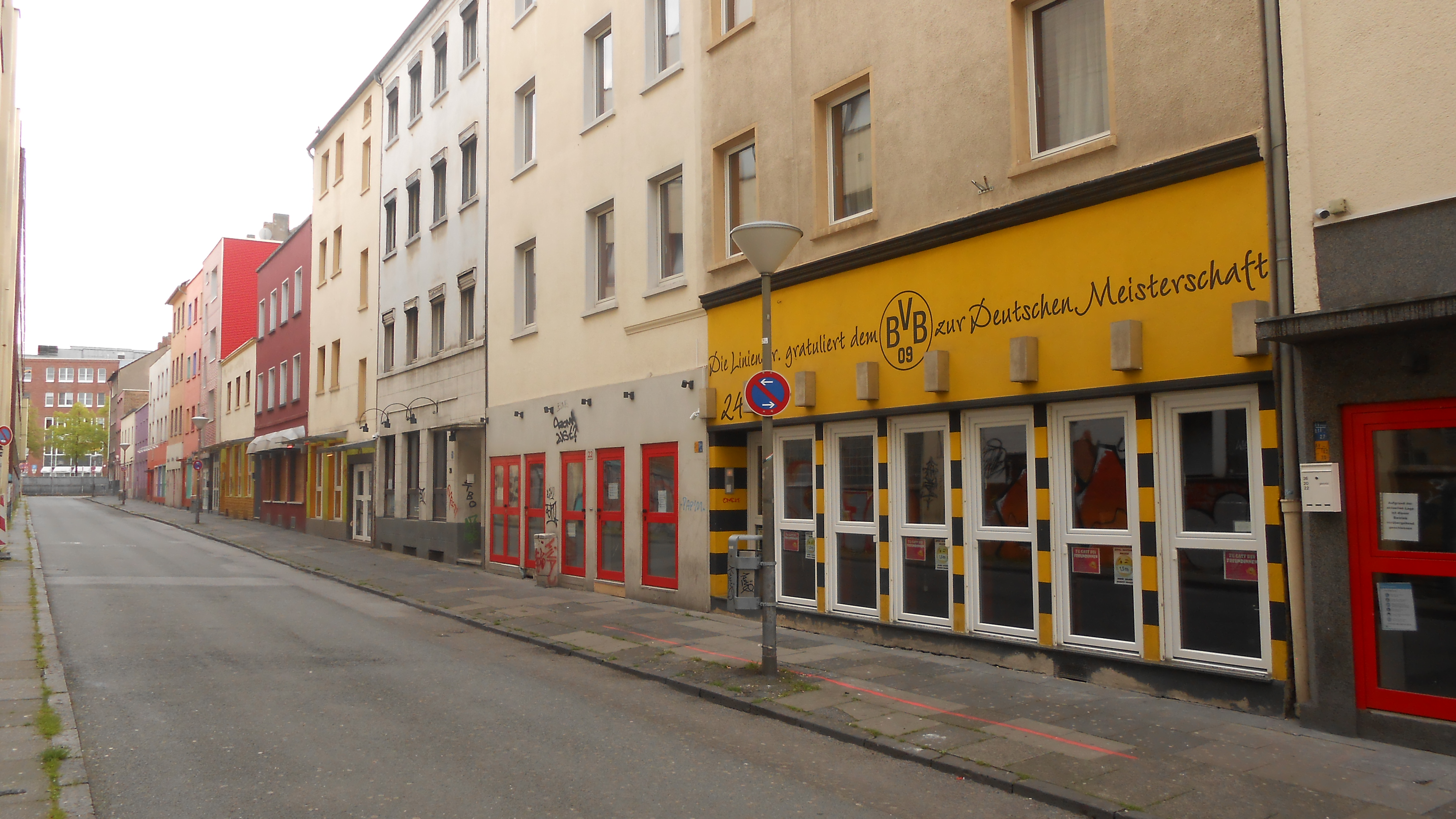

- Location within Germany
- Former name: Marschallstraße
- Location: Stadtbezirk Innenstadt-Nord, Dortmund, North Rhine-Westphalia, Germany
- Coordinates: 51.520278°N 7.4625°E
- From: Steinstraße
- To: Leopoldstraße

Other
- Known for: Prostitution

The Linienstraße (German pronunciation: [ˈliːniənˌʃtʁaːsə], lit. 'Line Street') is a street in Dortmund, Germany, known for prostitution. The street is located north of the city's main railway station Dortmund Hauptbahnhof in the Stadtbezirk Innenstadt-Nord district. There have been brothels on Linienstraße since the beginning of the 20th century. Under the "Sperrbezirk" regulations, prostitution in central Dortmund is only permitted in Linienstraße.

The street is about 200 meters long and has a privacy screen across the entrance. A sign at the north entrance to the street, referring to a defunct law from 1957, states access is only for adults. In the Linienstraße there is window prostitution, with services and prices usually being negotiated at the window before the client enters.

== History ==
According to the city archives, there was street prostitution on Marschallstraße in 1898. By 1904, the street name had changed to Linienstraße and there were brothels on the street. The Dortmund Midnight Mission (Dortmunder Mitternachtsmission) was founded in 1918 to administer to the needs of the prostitutes.

Irish poet and author Samuel Beckett's poem Dortmunder, published in 1935 in Echo's Bones and Other Precipitates, tells of Beckett drinking in Dortmund and ending up in Linienstraße.

== Modern times ==
In 2010, one of the brothels was sold at auction for 1.1 million euros, another brothel was offered for sale in 2018.

A large anti-sex trafficking poster was erected on the end wall on the house on the corner of Linienstraße and Steinstraße in 2017. The poster was erected in collaboration with the Midnight Mission and financed by the 16 houses and 200 women of Linienstraße.

Artist Bettina Brökelschen spent two years painting Linienstraße and the women working there. Her works were the subject of an exhibition, People in Linienstraße, in 2019.

Prostitution in Linienstraße was temporarily suspended in mid-March 2020 as part of the preventative measures introduced during the coronavirus pandemic.

== Dortmund model ==
At the instigation of the Midnight Mission a series of "round table" discussions about prostitution in the city took place, starting in 2002. Initially the attendees were the Midnight Mission, Dortmund Police and involved council departments, soon Linienstraße's brothel operators became involved to agree common goals. From these discussions the "Dortmund model" was evolved. The aims were to combat forced prostitution, human trafficking and underage prostitution. The model is to a degree self-regulating; the brothel operators and existing prostitutes ensure that new women working in Linienstraße are over 18, have necessary documentation and are not under the control of a pimp.

The model was approved by the City Council and forms part of the city's strategy on prostitution. Other cities in North Rhine-Westphalia have looked at the model and some have adopted its basic principles.

In a 2007, the German Federal Ministry of Family Affairs, Senior Citizens, Women and Youth's Report by the Federal Government on the Impact of the Act Regulating the Legal Situation of Prostitutes (Prostitution Act) noted the positive feedback that Dortmund Police had given the "Dortmund model".

== See also ==
- Prostitution in Germany
