= Bruchstraße =

Street in Braunschweig, Germany

Street in Braunschweig, Germany
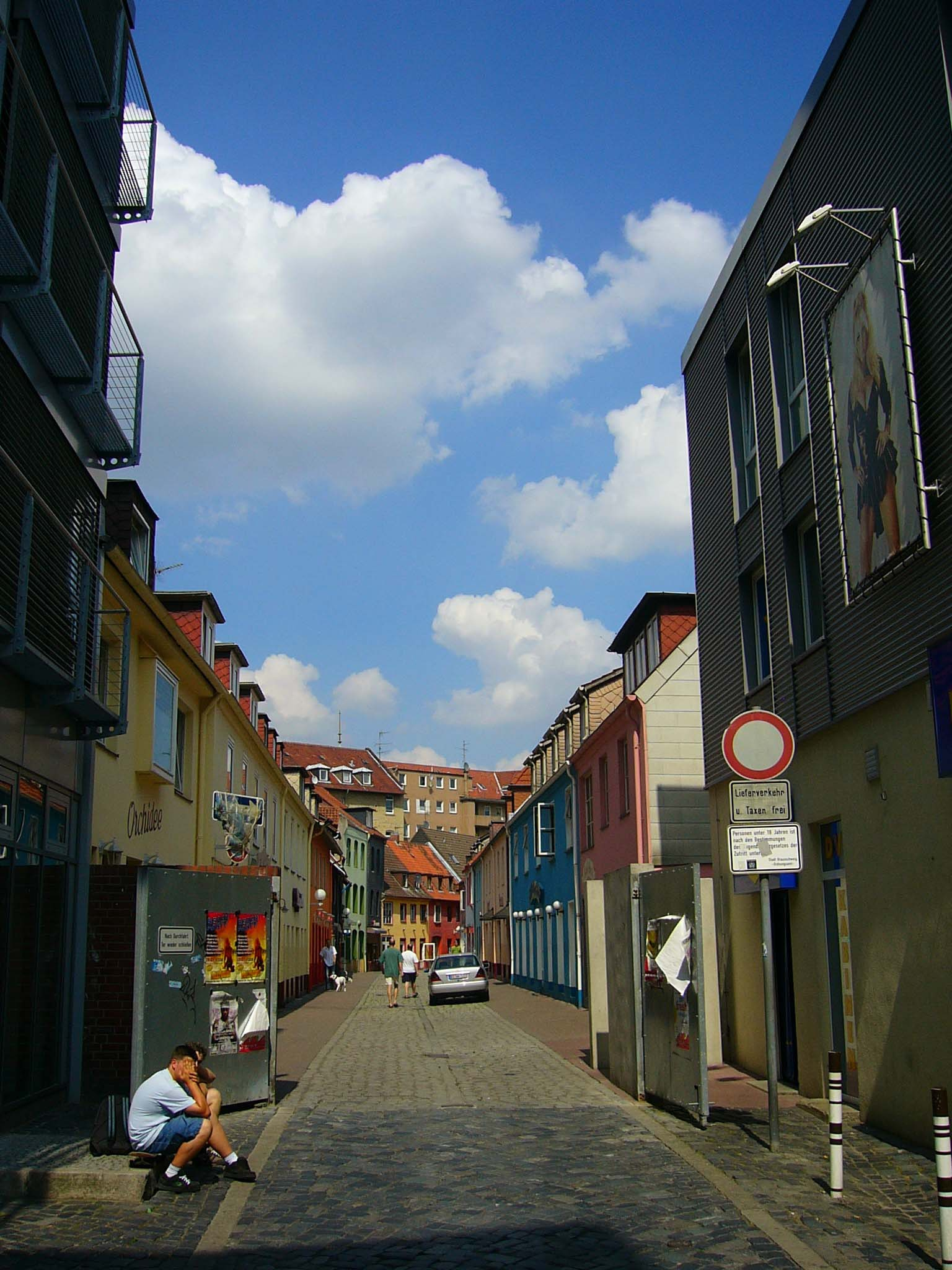
- Bruchstrasse from the direction of Wallstraße
- Interactive map of Bruchstraße
- Location: Friedrich Wilhelm district, Braunschweig, Lower Saxony, Germany
- Coordinates: 52.26089°N 10.52103°E
- From: Wallstraße
- To: Friedrich-Wilhelm-Straße

Other
- Known for: Window prostitution

The Bruchstraße (German pronunciation: [ˈbʁʊxˌʃtʁaːsə], lit. 'Swamp Street') is a cobbled street in Braunschweig, Lower Saxony, Germany. The street has many historic half-timbered houses and is the centre of the city's red light district and has a number of "windows". There are iron gates at both ends of the street, at the junctions with Wallstraße and Friedrich-Wilhelm-Straße.

== History ==
Prostitution in the Bruchstraße dates back to the Middle Ages, and is possibly the oldest red-light district in Germany. At the beginning of the 15th century, there were 5 brothels in Echternstraße, including one called the "Rote Kloster" (Red Monastery). Prostitution was overseen by Braunschweig's hangman. There was also a brothel called "Fruwenhus" in Mauernstraße.

Around the same time, the marshland between the two branches of the Oker river was being drained and landfill were being dumped there. This led to an undulating landscape. Being beyond the city walls, the nature of the area, it was used as a hideout for criminals. The prostitutes also settled here and disreputable bars opened. Prostitution continued here despite the 1594 law prohibiting fornication.

In 1806 the city came under the control of the French and troops were stationed in the city. There were concerns about STIs amongst the soldiers and the prostitutes were subjected to compulsory health checks.

The street was named Bruchstraße in 1858. During World War II Braunschweig was bombed 42 times. An Allied air raid on 15 October 15, 1944 destroyed most of the city's churches, and the Altstadt (old town). The 33 half-timbered houses in Bruchstraße survived the bombings.

== Modern times ==
In 2013, there were proposals to open up the gated street and add restaurants and bars as part of the regeneration of the Friedrich Wilhelm district. This was opposed to by the police, spokesman Wolfgang Klages saying the current arrangement "is actually the ideal situation to keep a close eye on it." The head of the Braunschweig health office, Sabine Pfingsten-Würzburg, also opposed the proposal.

From 1 July 2017, all prostitutes and brothel operators were required to be registered Under the Prostitutes Protection Act. In 2018, there were 167 prostitutes registered in Braunschweig.
