= Antoniusstraße =

Street in Aachen, Germany

Street in Aachen, Germany
- Sträßchen, Antüen
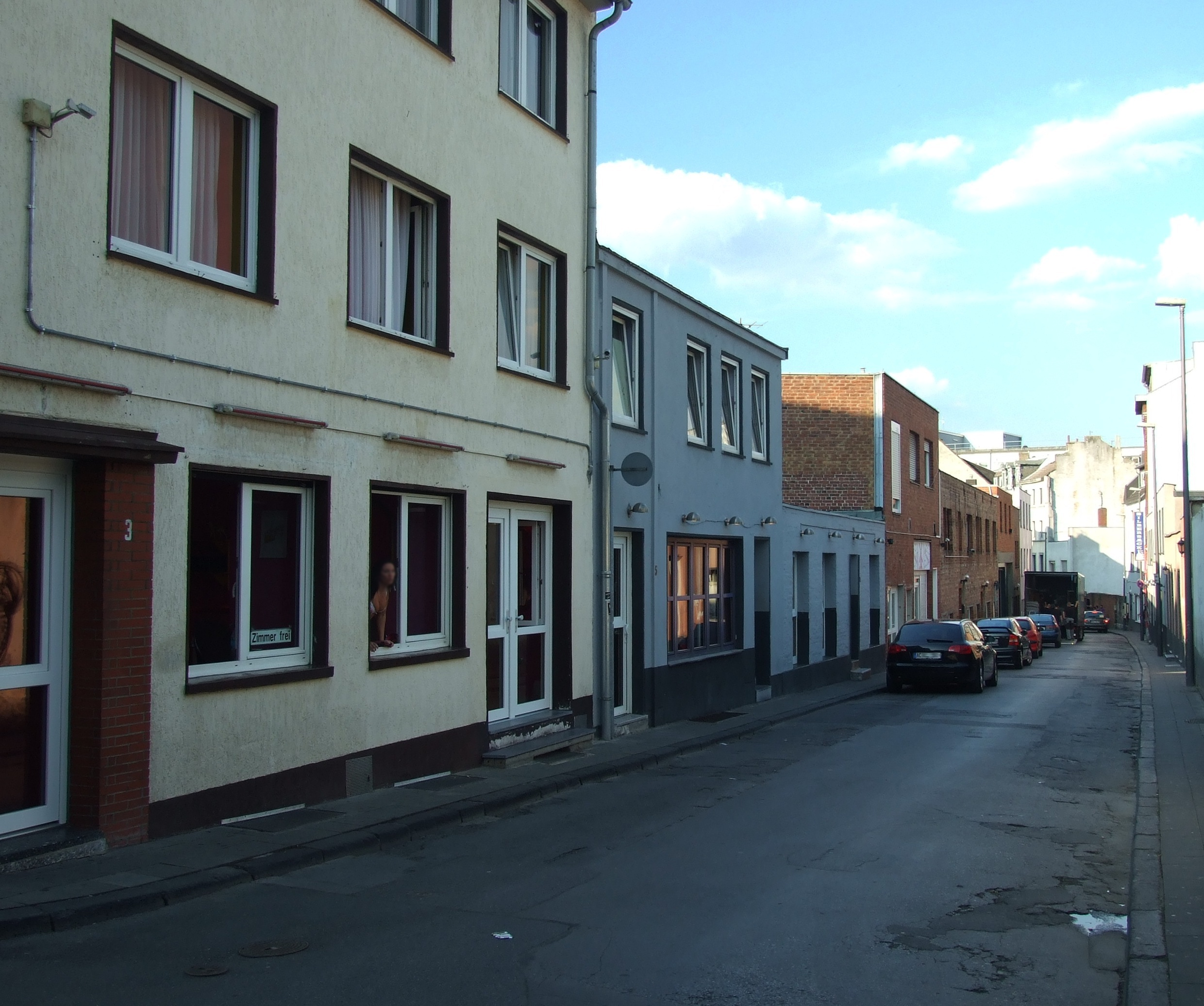
- Western entry to Antoniusstraße
- Interactive map of Antoniusstraße
- Former name: Hurengasse
- Namesake: Saint Anthony of Padua
- Location: Aachen-Mitte, Aachen, North Rhine-Westphalia, Germany
- Coordinates: 50.7766378°N 6.0855478°E
- From: Nikolausstrasse
- To: Mefferdatisstrasse

Other
- Known for: Window prostitution

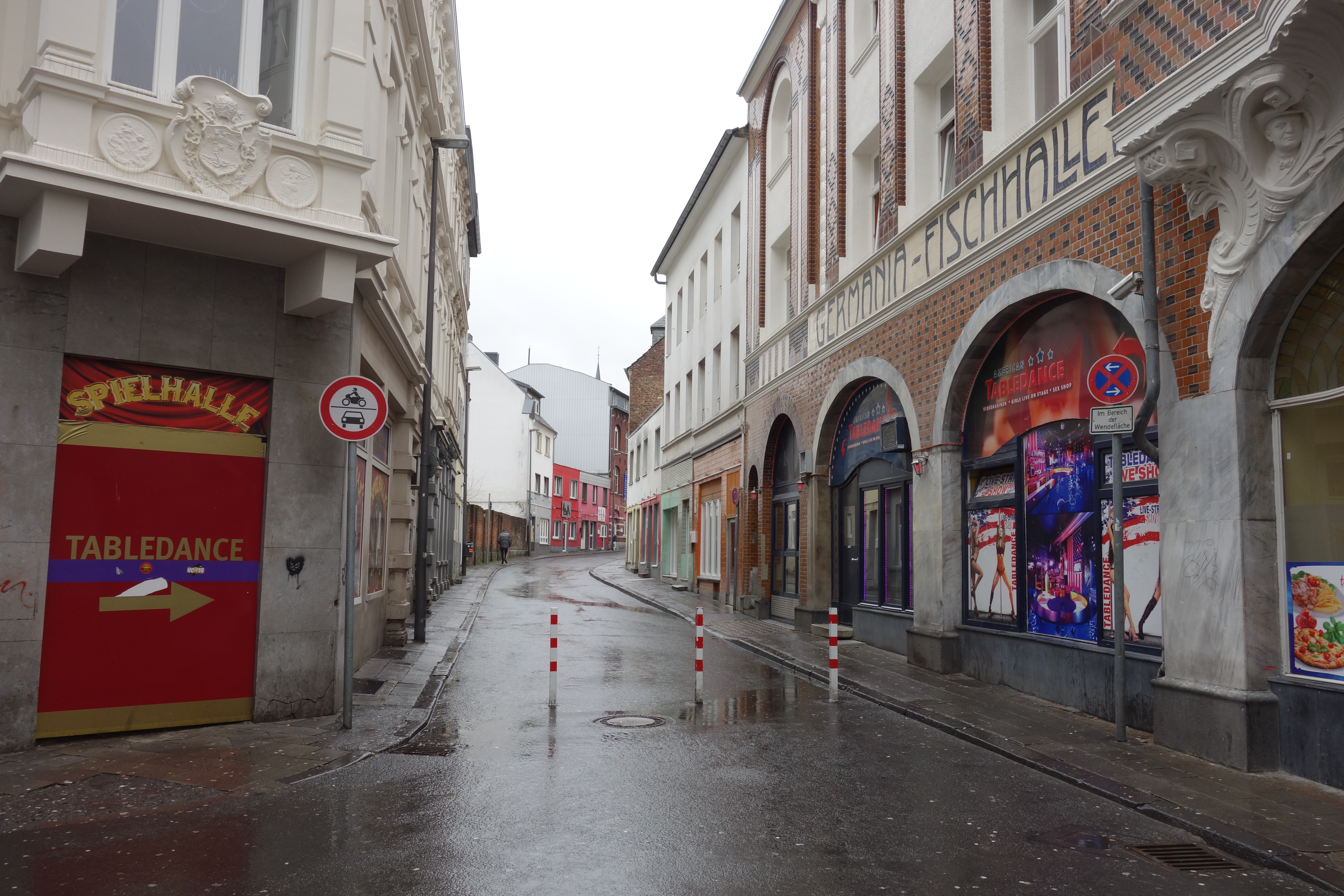
Eastern entrance to Antoniusstraße

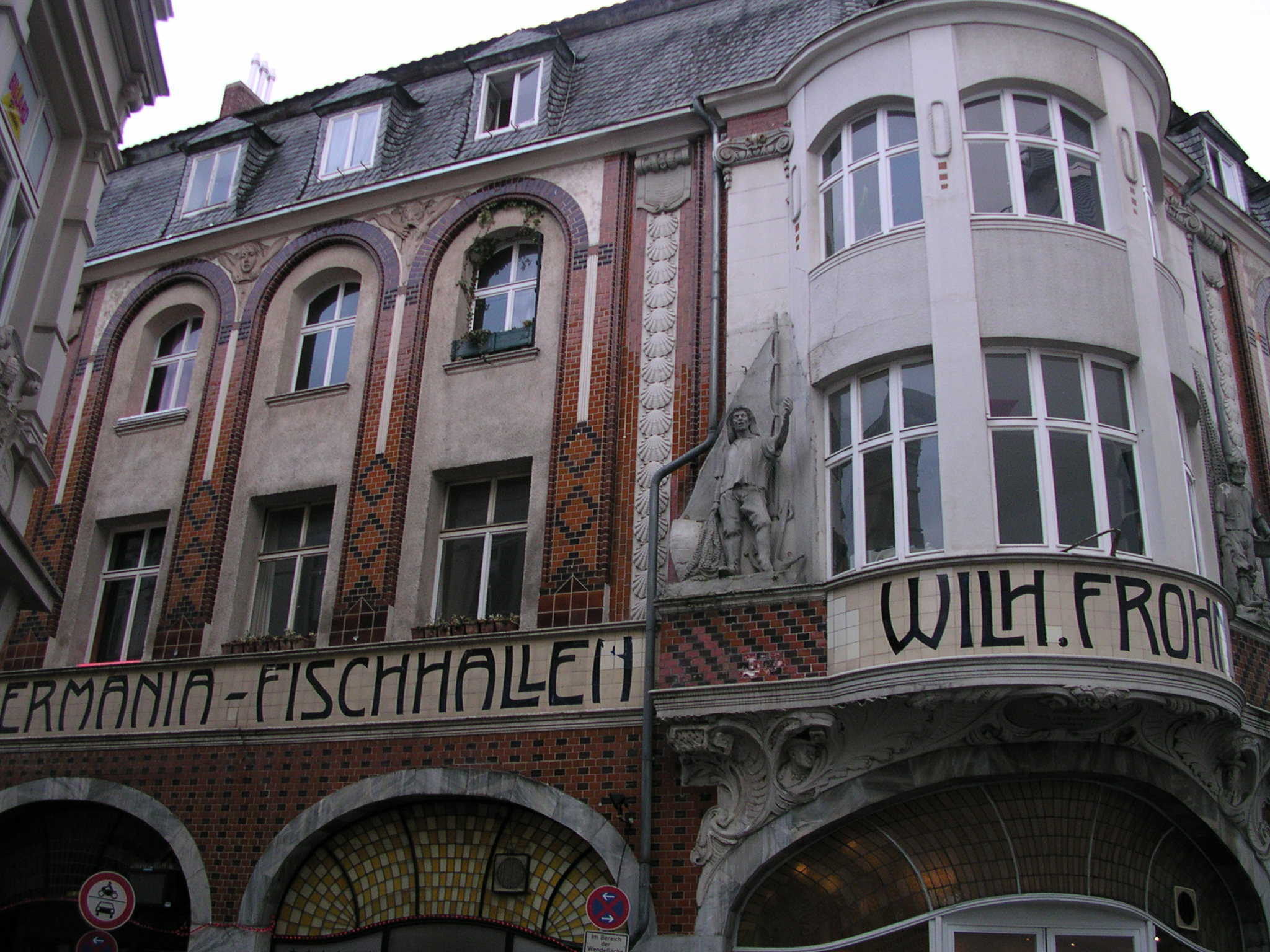
The "Germania Fischhallen"

The Antoniusstraße (German pronunciation: [anˈtoːniʊsˌʃtʁaːsə], lit. 'Anthony Street') is one of the oldest streets of in the centre of Aachen, North Rhine-Westphalia, Germany. It is known for window prostitution.

== History ==
There was a settlement at the location of today's road from the time of the Roman Empire. When the foundations for the "Germania Fischhallen" were dug in 1905, numerous vessels and remains of walls from Roman and medieval times were found. Excavations to reroute a sewer in 2014 found a Roman iron smelting fire-pit in the street. The street was named Hurengasse in the Middle Ages and early modern times, referring to brothels in the street during the period. The location of the "pleasure trade" in the street was probably due to its close proximity to the two spa districts on the Büchel and in Komphausbadstrasse. (Note: The cure in the 17th and 18th centuries did not focus on the medical aspect, but on sensual pleasure and entertainment.) It was renamed to Antoniusstraße in 1872 after the City Council obtained royal approval. It is named after Saint Anthony of Padua, who campaigned for the poor and for prostitutes.

In addition to prostitution, Antoniusstraße has been home to other companies over the years. A chemical factory, set up by the pharmacist Johann Peter Joseph Monheim and operated by his son Viktor Monheim and grandson Johannes Theodor Monheim, caught fire on 29 June 1883 and triggered a large fire that also affected Aachen Town Hall. The largest Aachen company for the production of fine papers, the stationers Frehn had its headquarters at 29 Antoniusstraße until the Second World War. The Germania Fischhallen built by entrepreneur Wilhelm Frohn in 1907. The building is currently used as a restaurant.

During the Second World War, the German Labour Front was the registered of the building No. 15.

The Aachen-born former professional boxer Klaus Gallwe is the property manager of the window-houses in Antoniusstraße.

== Controversy ==
The Antoniusstraße continues to be dominated by prostitutes offering their services from windows. Due to the location of the street in the middle of the pedestrian zone in the city centre, multiple attempts have been made to move prostitution out of the area. Access for emergency vehicles prevents privacy screens being set up at both ends of the street, such as in Hamburg 's Herbertstrasse, and there is a screen only at one end. In 2009, former Lord Mayor Jürgen Linden proposed restricting prostitutes to half of the street. This was resisted by the owners of the windows and, amongst other reasons, cited the ever decreasing crime rate in the street in recent years.

In 2010, backed by local politicians, an investor also aimed to push back the red-light district. Apart from the FDP, which wants to move the entire brothel area, there is a bipartisan agreement to leave the red light district on Antoniusstraße. In 2017, new plans were drawn up to concentrate prostitution in a newly built "Laufhaus" in the lower part of the street as part of a redevelopment of the area. The "Laufhaus" would be able to accommodate 120 prostitutes. This plan was opposed by some, including police commissioner Dirk Weinspach, who wanted to see prostitution move to the outskirts of the city.

== See also ==
- Prostitution in Germany
- Timeline of Aachen

== Notes and references ==
=== Bibliography ===
- Banach, Benti (15 November 2015). "Toekomst Akense prostitutie op Antoniusstraße onzeker" [Future of Aachen prostitution on Antoniusstraße uncertain]. De Limburger.
- Barth, Alexander (2012). "Die Antoniusstraße. Sündiges Sträßchen unter himmlischen Schutz [Sinful little street under heavenly protection]". 111 Orte in Aachen und der Euregio die man gesehen haben muss [111 places in Aachen and the Euregio that you have to see] (in German). Emons, H J. ISBN 978-3-89705-931-3.
- Becker, Julia L. (2018). Die Eisenmetallurgie im römischen Aachen [Iron metallurgy in Roman Aachen] (Thesis) (in German). University of Cologne Archaeological Institute.
- Breucha, Lucy (29 June 2010). "Aachen: Muss die Antoniusstraße weichen?" [Aachen: Does Antoniusstraße have to give way?]. Aachener Zeitung (in German).
- Esser, Robert (20 April 2010). "Aachen: Investor drängt Rotlichtviertel zurück: Neubau an Antoniusstraße" [Aachen: Investor pushes red light district back: new building on Antoniusstrasse]. Aachener Zeitung (in German).
- Hautermans, Heiner (5 November 2010). "Aachen: Antoniusstraße erhält an einer Seite einen Sichtschutz" [Aachen: Antoniusstraße has a privacy screen on one side]. Aachener Nachrichten (in German).
- Schmetz, Oliver (11 November 2010). "Aachen: Hängepartie im "Sträßchen"" [Aachen: Hanging game in the "street"]. Aachener Zeitung (in German).
- Schumacher, Wolfgang (15 April 2012). "Aachen: Neue Regeln für die Antoniusstraße" [Aachen: New rules for Antoniusstrasse]. Aachener Nachrichten (in German).
- Vigener, Manfred (2000). Lebendiges Wasser: die Aachener und Burtscheider Thermalquellen [Living water: the Aachen and Burtscheid thermal springs] (in German). Ökologie-Zentrum. ISBN 978-3-00-005619-2.
