= Caradus =

Caradus is a surname. Notable people with the surname include:

- Edward Caradus (1885–1969), New Zealand analytical chemist, educator and administrator
- Elizabeth Caradus (1832–1912), New Zealand suffragist, temperance and welfare worker

== See also ==
- Cardus (surname)
