= List of acts of the Parliament of the United Kingdom from 1886 =

This is a complete list of acts of the Parliament of the United Kingdom for the year 1886.

Note that the first parliament of the United Kingdom was held in 1801; parliaments between 1707 and 1800 were either parliaments of Great Britain or of Ireland). For acts passed up until 1707, see the list of acts of the Parliament of England and the list of acts of the Parliament of Scotland. For acts passed from 1707 to 1800, see the list of acts of the Parliament of Great Britain. See also the list of acts of the Parliament of Ireland.

For acts of the devolved parliaments and assemblies in the United Kingdom, see the list of acts of the Scottish Parliament, the list of acts of the Northern Ireland Assembly, and the list of acts and measures of Senedd Cymru; see also the list of acts of the Parliament of Northern Ireland.

The number shown after each act's title is its chapter number. Acts passed before 1963 are cited using this number, preceded by the year(s) of the reign during which the relevant parliamentary session was held; thus the Union with Ireland Act 1800 is cited as "39 & 40 Geo. 3 c. 67", meaning the 67th act passed during the session that started in the 39th year of the reign of George III and which finished in the 40th year of that reign. Note that the modern convention is to use Arabic numerals in citations (thus "41 Geo. 3" rather than "41 Geo. III"). Acts of the last session of the Parliament of Great Britain and the first session of the Parliament of the United Kingdom are both cited as "41 Geo. 3". Acts passed from 1963 onwards are simply cited by calendar year and chapter number.

All modern acts have a short title, e.g. the Local Government Act 2003. Some earlier acts also have a short title given to them by later acts, such as by the Short Titles Act 1896.

== 49 & 50 Vict. ==
The 23rd Parliament of the United Kingdom, which met from 12 January 1886 until 25 June 1886.

=== Public general acts ===
Short title	Citation	Royal assent
Long title
Land Registry Act 1886 (repealed)	49 & 50 Vict. c. 1	5 March 1886
An Act to make temporary provision for the conduct of the Business of the Office of Land Registry. (Repealed by Land Registration Act 1925 (15 & 16 Geo. 5. c. 21))
Freshwater Fisheries Act 1886 (repealed)	49 & 50 Vict. c. 2	15 March 1886
An Act to declare the meaning of Section Eleven of the Freshwater Fisheries Act, 1878, (Note: Freshwater Fisheries Act 1878 (41 & 42 Vict. c. 39)) so far as regards Eels. (Repealed by Salmon and Freshwater Fisheries Act 1923 (13 & 14 Geo. 5. c. 16))
Marriages Validity Act 1886 (repealed)	49 & 50 Vict. c. 3	29 March 1886
An Act to remove Doubts as to the Validity of certain Marriages. (Repealed by Marriage Act 1949 (12, 13 & 14 Geo. 6. c. 76))
Consolidated Fund (No. 1) Act 1886 (repealed)	49 & 50 Vict. c. 4	29 March 1886
An Act to apply certain sums out of the Consolidated Fund to the service of the years ending on the thirty-first day of March one thousand eight hundred and eighty-five and one thousand eight hundred and eighty-six. (Repealed by Statute Law Revision Act 1898 (61 & 62 Vict. c. 22))
Drill Grounds Act 1886 (repealed)	49 & 50 Vict. c. 5	29 March 1886
An Act for extending, with Amendments, to Grounds for Drill and other Military Purposes, the Enactments relating to the Acquisition and Regulation of Rifle Ranges. (Repealed by Military Lands Act 1892 (55 & 56 Vict. c. 43))
Glebe Loan (Ireland) Acts Amendment Act 1886 (repealed)	49 & 50 Vict. c. 6	29 March 1886
An Act to continue the Glebe Loans (Ireland) Acts. (Repealed by Statute Law Revision Act 1898 (61 & 62 Vict. c. 22) and Statute Law Revision Act (Northern Ireland) 1954 (c. 35 (N.I.)))
Consolidated Fund (No. 2) Act 1886 (repealed)	49 & 50 Vict. c. 7	31 March 1886
An Act to apply the sum of twelve million seven hundred and thirteen thousand three hundred and eighteen pounds out of the Consolidated Fund to the service of the year ending on the thirty-first day of March one thousand eight hundred and eighty-seven. (Repealed by Statute Law Revision Act 1898 (61 & 62 Vict. c. 22))
Army (Annual) Act 1886 (repealed)	49 & 50 Vict. c. 8	16 April 1886
An Act to provide, during twelve months, for the Discipline and Regulation of the Army. (Repealed by Statute Law Revision Act 1898 (61 & 62 Vict. c. 22) and Statute Law Revision Act 1950 (14 Geo. 6. c. 6))
Prison (Officers' Superannuation) Act 1886 (repealed)	49 & 50 Vict. c. 9	16 April 1886
An Act to amend the Prisons Act of 1877, (Note: Prisons Act 1877 (40 & 41 Vict. c. 21)) so far as regards the Superannuation of Prison Officers. (Repealed by Statute Law Revision Act 1950 (14 Geo. 6. c. 6))
Contagious Diseases Acts Repeal Act 1886 (repealed)	49 & 50 Vict. c. 10	16 April 1886
An Act to repeal the Contagious Diseases Acts, 1886 to 1869. (Repealed by Statute Law Revision Act 1898 (61 & 62 Vict. c. 22))
Metropolitan Police (Compensation) Act 1886 (repealed)	49 & 50 Vict. c. 11	16 April 1886
An Act to provide for the Payment of Compensation for Damage done during a certain Riot in the Metropolitan District. (Repealed by Statute Law Revision Act 1898 (61 & 62 Vict. c. 22))
Bankruptcy (Office Accommodation) Act 1886 (repealed)	49 & 50 Vict. c. 12	16 April 1886
An Act to amend the Bankruptcy (Office Accommodation) Act, 1885. (Note: Bankruptcy (Office Accommodation) Act 1885 (48 & 49 Vict. c. 47)) (Repealed by Bankruptcy Act 1914 (4 & 5 Geo. 5. c. 59))
Cape Race Lighthouse Act 1886 (repealed)	49 & 50 Vict. c. 13	10 May 1886
An Act to provide for the transfer to the Dominion of Canada of the Lighthouse at Cape Race, Newfoundland, and its appurtenances, and for other purposes connected therewith. (Repealed by Statute Law Revision Act 1963 (c. 30))
Marriage Act 1886 (repealed)	49 & 50 Vict. c. 14	10 May 1886
An Act for extending the Hours within which Marriages may be lawfully solemnized. (Repealed by Marriage Act 1949 (12, 13 & 14 Geo. 6. c. 76))
Sporting Lands Rating (Scotland) Act 1886 (repealed)	49 & 50 Vict. c. 15	10 May 1886
An Act to amend the Law as to the Rating of Lands occupied for Sporting purposes in Scotland. (Repealed by Local Government etc. (Scotland) Act 1994 (c. 39))
Lunacy (Vacating of Seats) Act 1886 (repealed)	49 & 50 Vict. c. 16	10 May 1886
An Act to amend the Law in regard to the Vacating of Seats in the House of Commons. (Repealed by Mental Health Act 1959 (7 & 8 Eliz. 2. c. 72))
Poor Relief (Ireland) Act 1886	49 & 50 Vict. c. 17	10 May 1886
An Act to make temporary provision for the better Relief of the destitute Poor in Ireland.
Customs and Inland Revenue Act 1886 (repealed)	49 & 50 Vict. c. 18	4 June 1886
An Act to grant certain Duties of Customs and Inland Revenue, and to amend the laws relating to Inland Revenue. (Repealed by Statute Law Revision Act 1898 (61 & 62 Vict. c. 22), Finance Act 1919 (9 & 10 Geo. 5. c. 32) and Statute Law Revision Act 1953 (2 & 3 Eliz. 2. c. 5))
National Debt Act 1886 (repealed)	49 & 50 Vict. c. 19	4 June 1886
An Act to suspend for a period certain Payments under the National Debt Act, 1881; (Note: National Debt Act 1881 (44 & 45 Vict. c. 55)) and to reduce for a like period the Permanent Annual Charge of the National Debt. (Repealed by National Debt and Local Loans Act 1887 (50 & 51 Vict. c. 16))
Burial of Drowned Persons Act 1886 or the Drowned Persons (Discovery and Interment) Act 1886 (repealed)	49 & 50 Vict. c. 20	4 June 1886
An Act to amend the Law in respect to the Discovery and Interment of Persons drowned. (Repealed by National Assistance Act 1948 (11 & 12 Geo. 6. c. 29))
Burial Grounds (Scotland) Amendment Act 1886 (repealed)	49 & 50 Vict. c. 21	4 June 1886
An Act to amend the Burial Grounds (Scotland) Act, 1855. (Note: Burial Grounds (Scotland) Act 1855 (18 & 19 Vict. c. 68)) (Repealed by Statute Law Revision Act 1898 (61 & 62 Vict. c. 22))
Metropolitan Police Act 1886	49 & 50 Vict. c. 22	4 June 1886
An Act to amend the Enactments relating to Offices, Stations, and Buildings for the Metropolitan Police Force.
Companies Act 1886 (repealed)	49 & 50 Vict. c. 23	4 June 1886
An Act to amend the Companies Acts of 1862, (Note: Companies Act 1862 (25 & 26 Vict. c. 89)) 1867, (Note: Companies Act 1867 (30 & 31 Vict. c. 131)) 1870, (Note: Joint Stock Companies Arrangement Act 1870 (33 & 34 Vict. c. 104)) 1877, (Note: Companies Act 1877 (40 & 41 Vict. c. 26)) 1879, (Note: Companies Act 1879 (42 & 43 Vict. c. 76)) 1880, (Note: Companies Act 1880 (43 Vict. c. 19)) and 1883. (Note: Companies Act 1883 (46 & 47 Vict. c. 28)) (Repealed by Companies (Consolidation) Act 1908 (8 Edw. 7. c. 69))
Peace Preservation (Ireland) Continuance Act 1886 (repealed)	49 & 50 Vict. c. 24	4 June 1886
An Act to continue and amend for a further limited period the Peace Preservation (Ireland) Act, 1881. (Note: Peace Preservation (Ireland) Act 1881 (44 & 45 Vict. c. 5)) (Repealed by Statute Law Revision Act 1898 (61 & 62 Vict. c. 22) and Statute Law Revision Act (Northern Ireland) 1954 (c. 35 (N.I.)))
Idiots Act 1886 (repealed)	49 & 50 Vict. c. 25	25 June 1886
An Act for giving facilities for the care, education, and training of Idiots and Imbeciles. (Repealed by Mental Deficiency Act 1913 (3 & 4 Geo. 5. c. 28))
Appropriation Act 1886 (repealed)	49 & 50 Vict. c. 26	25 June 1886
An Act to apply a sum out of the Consolidated Fund to the service of the year ending on the thirty-first day of March one thousand eight hundred and eighty-seven, and to appropriate the Supplies granted in this Session of Parliament. (Repealed by Statute Law Revision Act 1898 (61 & 62 Vict. c. 22))
Guardianship of Infants Act 1886	49 & 50 Vict. c. 27	25 June 1886
An Act to amend the Law relating to the Guardianship and Custody of Infants. (Repealed for England and Wales by Guardianship of Minors Act 1971 (c. 3) and for Scotland by Law Reform (Parent and Child) (Scotland) Act 1986 (c. 9))
Bankruptcy (Agricultural Labourers' Wages) Act 1886 (repealed)	49 & 50 Vict. c. 28	25 June 1886
An Act to amend the Law relating to Bankruptcy so far as relates to Agricultural Labourers' Wages. (Repealed by Preferential Payments in Bankruptcy Act 1888 (51 & 52 Vict. c. 62))
Crofters' Holdings (Scotland) Act 1886 or the Crofters' Act 1886	49 & 50 Vict. c. 29	25 June 1886
An Act to amend the Law relating to the Tenure of Land by Crofters in the Highlands and Islands of Scotland, and for other purposes relating thereto.
Patriotic Fund Act 1886 (repealed)	49 & 50 Vict. c. 30	25 June 1886
An Act to amend the Patriotic Fund Acts, 1867 (Note: Patriotic Fund Act 1867 (30 & 31 Vict. c. 98)) and 1881. (Note: Patriotic Fund Act 1881 (44 & 45 Vict. c. 46)) (Repealed by Patriotic Fund Reorganisation Act 1903 (3 Edw. 7. c. 20))
Oxford University (Justices) Act 1886 (repealed)	49 & 50 Vict. c. 31	25 June 1886
An Act to remove doubts respecting the sitting and acting of the Chancellor and other Officers of the University of Oxford as Justices of the Peace. (Repealed by Justices of the Peace Act 1968 (c. 69))
Contagious Diseases (Animals) Act 1886 (repealed)	49 & 50 Vict. c. 32	25 June 1886
An Act to amend the Contagious Diseases (Animals) Act, 1878. (Note: Contagious Diseases (Animals) Act 1878 (41 & 42 Vict. c. 74)) (Repealed for England and Wales and Scotland by Public Health (London) Act 1891 (54 & 55 Vict. c. 76), Diseases of Animals Act 1894 (57 & 58 Vict. c. 57), Milk and Dairies (Scotland) Act 1914 (4 & 5 Geo. 5. c. 46) and Milk and Dairies (Consolidation) Act 1915 (5 & 6 Geo. 5. c. 66) and for Northern Ireland by Food and Drugs Act (Northern Ireland) 1958 (c. 27 (N.I.)))
International Copyright Act 1886 (repealed)	49 & 50 Vict. c. 33	25 June 1886
An Act to amend the Law respecting International and Colonial Copyright. (Repealed by Copyright Act 1911 (1 & 2 Geo. 5. c. 46))
Incumbents of Benefices Loans Extension Act 1886 (repealed)	49 & 50 Vict. c. 34	25 June 1886
An Act to extend the time for the Repayment of Loans granted by the Governors of the Bounty of Queen Anne for the Augmentation of the Maintenance of the Poor Clergy to Incumbents of Benefices. (Repealed by Statute Law Revision Act 1898 (61 & 62 Vict. c. 22))
British North America Act 1886 known in Canada as the Constitution Act, 1886	49 & 50 Vict. c. 35	25 June 1886
An Act respecting the representation in the Parliament of Canada of territories which for the time being form part of the Dominion of Canada, but are not included in any province.
West Indian Incumbered Estates Act 1886 (repealed)	49 & 50 Vict. c. 36	25 June 1886
An Act to provide for the determination of the Acts respecting the Sale and Transfer of Incumbered Estates in the West Indies. (Repealed by Statute Law Revision Act 1898 (61 & 62 Vict. c. 22))
Patents Act 1886 (repealed)	49 & 50 Vict. c. 37	25 June 1886
An Act to remove certain doubts respecting the construction of the Patents, Designs, and Trade Marks Act, 1883, (Note: Patents, Designs, and Trade Marks Act 1883 (46 & 47 Vict. c. 57)) so far as respects the drawings by which specifications are required to be accompanied and as respects exhibitions. (Repealed by Patents and Designs Act 1907 (7 Edw. 7. c. 29))
Riot (Damages) Act 1886 (repealed)	49 & 50 Vict. c. 38	25 June 1886
An Act to provide Compensation for Losses by Riots. (Repealed by Riot Compensation Act 2016 (c. 8))
Salmon and Freshwater Fisheries Act 1886 (repealed)	49 & 50 Vict. c. 39	25 June 1886
An Act to amend the Law relating to Salmon and Freshwater Fisheries (Repealed by Salmon and Freshwater Fisheries Act 1923 (13 & 14 Geo. 5. c. 16))
Coal Mines Act 1886 (repealed)	49 & 50 Vict. c. 40	25 June 1886
An Act to amend the Coal Mines Regulation Act, 1872. (Note: Coal Mines Regulation Act 1872 (35 & 36 Vict. c. 76)) (Repealed by Coal Mines Regulation Act 1887 (50 & 51 Vict. c. 58))
Customs Amendment Act 1886 (repealed)	49 & 50 Vict. c. 41	25 June 1886
An Act to alter certain duties of Customs and to amend the laws relating to the Customs, and for other purposes. (Repealed by Statute Law (Repeals) Act 1986 (c. 12))
Revising Barristers Act 1886 (repealed)	49 & 50 Vict. c. 42	25 June 1886
An Act for amending the Law as to the appointment of Revising Barristers in England. (Repealed by Representation of the People Act 1918 (7 & 8 Geo. 5. c. 64))
Revising Barristers (Ireland) Act 1886 (repealed)	49 & 50 Vict. c. 43	25 June 1886
An Act to amend the Law relating to the Appointment of Revising Barristers and the attendance of County Officers at Revision Courts in Ireland. (Repealed by Representation of the People Act 1918 (7 & 8 Geo. 5. c. 64))
Metropolitan Board of Works (Money) Act 1886 (repealed)	49 & 50 Vict. c. 44	25 June 1886
An Act further to amend the Acts relating to the raising of Money by the Metropolitan Board of Works; and for other purposes. (Repealed by London County Council (Finance Consolidation) Act 1912 (2 & 3 Geo. 5. c. cv))
Public Works Loans Act 1886	49 & 50 Vict. c. 45	25 June 1886
An Act to grant Money for the purpose of loans by the Public Works Loan Commissioners, the Commissioners of Public Works in Ireland, the Irish Land Commissioners, and the Fishery Board for Scotland, and to amend the Acts and make other provisions relating to the above-mentioned Commissioners and Board. (Repealed for Northern Ireland by Public Works Loans Act 1897 (60 & 61 Vict. c. 51), Statute Law Revision Act 1898 (61 & 62 Vict. c. 22) and Public Works, etc., Loans Act (Northern Ireland) 1953 (c. 13 (N.I.)))
Public Works Loans (Ireland) Act 1886 or the Public Works Loans (Tramways, Ireland) Act 1886 (repealed)	49 & 50 Vict. c. 46	25 June 1886
An Act to amend the Act of the sixth and seventh years of William the Fourth, chapter one hundred and eight. (Note: Public Works (Ireland) Act 1836 (6 & 7 Will. 4. c. 108)) (Repealed by Statute Law Revision Act 1898 (61 & 62 Vict. c. 22) and Public Works, etc., Loans Act (Northern Ireland) 1953 (c. 13 (N.I.)))
Land Tax Commissioners Names Act 1886 (repealed)	49 & 50 Vict. c. 47	25 June 1886
An Act to appoint additional Commissioners for executing the Acts for granting a Land Tax and other Rates and Taxes. (Repealed by Statute Law Revision Act 1950 (14 Geo. 6. c. 6))
Medical Act 1886 (repealed)	49 & 50 Vict. c. 48	25 June 1886
An Act to amend the Medical Acts. (Repealed by Statute Law (Repeals) Act 1986 (c. 12))
Peterhead Harbour of Refuge Act 1886	49 & 50 Vict. c. 49	25 June 1886
An Act to empower the Admiralty to form a Harbour of Refuge at Peterhead, in the county of Aberdeen, and to execute and maintain breakwater piers and other works and conveniences in connection therewith: and for other purposes.
Removal Terms (Scotland) Act 1886	49 & 50 Vict. c. 50	25 June 1886
An Act to amend the Law relating to the Terms of Removal from Houses in Scotland.
Poor Law Loans and Relief (Scotland) Act 1886 (repealed)	49 & 50 Vict. c. 51	25 June 1886
An Act to make provision for the borrowing of Money by Parochial Boards, and for other purposes relating to the Relief of the Poor in Scotland. (Repealed by National Assistance Act 1948 (11 & 12 Geo. 6. c. 29))
Married Women (Maintenance in case of Desertion) Act 1886 (repealed)	49 & 50 Vict. c. 52	25 June 1886
An Act to amend the Law relating to the Maintenance of Married Women who shall have been deserted by their Husbands. (Repealed for England and Wales by Summary Jurisdiction (Married Women) Act 1895 (58 & 59 Vict. c. 39) and for Northern Ireland by Summary Jurisdiction (Separation and Maintenance) Act (Northern Ireland) 1945 (c. 14 (N.I.)))
Sea Fishing Boats (Scotland) Act 1886 (repealed)	49 & 50 Vict. c. 53	25 June 1886
An Act to amend the law relating to Sea Fishing Boats in Scotland. (Repealed by Merchant Shipping Act 1988 (c. 12))
Extraordinary Tithe Redemption Act 1886 (repealed)	49 & 50 Vict. c. 54	25 June 1886
An Act to amend the Tithe Commutation Acts as to Extraordinary Tithe Rentcharge on hop grounds, orchards, fruit plantations, and market gardens, and to provide for fixing the capital value thereof and the redemption of the same. (Repealed by Statute Law Revision Act 1898 (61 & 62 Vict. c. 22) and Tithe Act 1936 (26 Geo. 5 & 1 Edw. 8. c. 43))
Shop Hours Regulation Act 1886 (repealed)	49 & 50 Vict. c. 55	25 June 1886
An Act to limit the Hours of Labour of Children and Young Persons in Shops. (Repealed by Statute Law Revision Act 1898 (61 & 62 Vict. c. 22))
Intoxicating Liquors (Sale to Children) Act 1886 (repealed)	49 & 50 Vict. c. 56	25 June 1886
An Act for the Protection of Children against the Sale to them of Intoxicating Liquors. (Repealed by Intoxicating Liquors (Sale to Children) Act 1901 (1 Edw. 7. c. 27))
Parliamentary Elections (Returning Officers) Act (1875) Amendment Act 1886 (repealed)	49 & 50 Vict. c. 57	25 June 1886
An Act to amend the provisions of the Parliamentary Elections (Returning Officers) Act, 1875. (Note: Parliamentary Elections (Returning Officers) Act 1875 (38 & 39 Vict. c. 84)) (Repealed by Statute Law (Repeals) Act 1978 (c. 45))
Returning Officers (Scotland) Act 1886 (repealed)	49 & 50 Vict. c. 58	25 June 1886
An Act to regulate the Expenses and to control the Charges of Returning Officers at Parliamentary Elections in Scotland. (Repealed by Representation of the People Act 1918 (7 & 8 Geo. 5. c. 64))
Labourers (Ireland) Act 1886 (repealed)	49 & 50 Vict. c. 59	25 June 1886
An Act to amend the Labourers (Ireland) Acts. (Repealed by Statute Law Revision Act (Northern Ireland) 1954 (c. 35 (N.I.)))

=== Local acts ===
Short title	Citation	Royal assent
Long title
Drainage and Improvement of Lands Supplemental (Ireland) Act 1886	49 & 50 Vict. c. i	31 March 1886
An Act to confirm a Provisional Order under the Drainage and Improvement of Lands (Ireland) Act, 1863, (Note: Drainage and Improvement of Lands (Ireland) Act 1863 (26 & 27 Vict. c. 88)) and the Acts amending the same, relating to the Glasheen River Drainage District, in the County of Cork.
	In the matter of the Glasheen River Drainage District, in the county of Cork.	
Highgate and Kilburn Open Spaces Act 1886	49 & 50 Vict. c. ii	31 March 1886
An Act for enabling the Ecclesiastical Commissioners for England to convey and the Mayor and Commonalty and Citizens of the City of London to acquire and hold as open spaces certain lands at Highgate and Kilburn in the County of Middlesex and for other purposes.
Beaconsfield, Uxbridge and Harrow Railway (Abandonment) Act 1886 (repealed)	49 & 50 Vict. c. iii	16 April 1886
An Act for the Abandonment of the Beaconsfield, Uxbridge and Harrow Railway. (Repealed by Statute Law (Repeals) Act 2013 (c. 2))
Forth Bridge Railway Act 1886	49 & 50 Vict. c. iv	16 April 1886
An Act to extend the Time for the Completion of the Forth Bridge Railway.
West Riding Police Superannuation Act 1886 (repealed)	49 & 50 Vict. c. v	16 April 1886
An Act to make further provisions with respect to the Superannuation Fund for the Police of the West Riding of the county of York. (Repealed by Statute Law (Repeals) Act 2008 (c. 12))
Scottish Union and National Insurance Company's Act 1886	49 & 50 Vict. c. vi	16 April 1886
An Act for amending the Scottish Union and National Insurance Company's Act, 1878; (Note: Scottish Union and National Insurance Company's Act 1878 (41 & 42 Vict. c. liii)) and for other purposes.
Listowel and Ballybunion Railway Act 1886	49 & 50 Vict. c. vii	16 April 1886
An Act for making a Railway from Listowel to Ballybunion in the county of Kerry; and for other purposes.
London Central Markets Act 1886	49 & 50 Vict. c. viii	16 April 1886
An Act for empowering the Mayor and Commonalty and Citizens of the City of London to make further and better provisions with reference to the London Central Markets; and for other purposes.
Bristol (Totterdown Bridge) Act 1886	49 & 50 Vict. c. ix	16 April 1886
An Act to authorise the construction of a Bridge over the River Avon from Bristol to Totterdown and for other purposes.
Edinburgh University Buildings Extension Act 1886	49 & 50 Vict. c. x	16 April 1886
An Act for extending and completing the buildings of the University of Edinburgh; the acquisition of lands; and other purposes.
Southampton Docks Act 1886	49 & 50 Vict. c. xi	16 April 1886
An Act to consolidate the Preference Stocks of the Southampton Dock Company and to enable the London and South Western Railway Company to subscribe to the Capital of that Company and for other purposes.
Bray and Enniskerry Light Railway Act 1886	49 & 50 Vict. c. xii	10 May 1886
An Act for making a Railway between Bray and Enniskerry in the county of Wicklow; and for other purposes.
Dublin, Wicklow and Wexford Railway Act 1886	49 & 50 Vict. c. xiii	10 May 1886
An Act to revive the powers and to extend the periods for the compulsory purchase of lands and to extend the periods for the completion of certain authorised railways by the Dublin Wicklow and Wexford Railway Company and to confer further powers on the Company with reference to their capital and to the Shillelagh and Newtownbarry Light Railway and for other purposes.
Metropolitan Commons Supplemental Act 1886	49 & 50 Vict. c. xiv	4 June 1886
An Act to confirm a Scheme under the Metropolitan Commons Act, 1866, (Note: Metropolitan Commons Act 1866 (29 & 30 Vict. c. 122)) and the Metropolitan Commons Amendment Act, 1869, (Note: Metropolitan Commons Amendment Act 1869 (32 & 33 Vict. c. 107)) relating to Chislehurst Common.
	Scheme with respect to Chislehurst Common.	
Commons Regulation (Stoke) Provisional Order Confirmation Act 1886 (repealed)	49 & 50 Vict. c. xv	4 June 1886
An Act to confirm the Provisional Order for the Regulation of Stoke Common, situated in the parishes of Stoke, Wyken, and Saint Michael, Coventry, in the county of Warwick, in pursuance of a report of the Land Commissioners for England. (Repealed by Coventry Corporation Act 1927 (17 & 18 Geo. 5. c. xc))
	Provisional Order for the Regulation of Stoke Common.	
Regulation and Inclosure (Totternhoe) Provisional Orders Confirmation Act 1886	49 & 50 Vict. c. xvi	4 June 1886
An Act to confirm the Provisional Order for the Regulation of the Commons, and the Provisional Order for the Inclosure of the Common Fields, situated in the parish of Totternhoe, in the county of Bedford, in pursuance of a Report of the Land Commissioners for England.
	Totternhoe Regulation Order 1886 Provisional Order for the Regulation of the Commons in the Parish of Totternhoe.	
	Totternhoe Inclosure Order 1886 Provisional Order for the Inclosure of the Common Fields in the Parish of Totternhoe.	
Local Government Board's Provisional Orders Confirmation Act 1886	49 & 50 Vict. c. xvii	4 June 1886
An Act to confirm certain Provisional Orders of the Local Government Board relating to the Borough of Aberavon, the Local Government District of Great Harwood, the Improvement Act District of Leek, the Local Government Districts of Bognor (two) and Shepton Mallet, and the District of Weston super Mare.
	Aberavon Order 1886 Provisional Order for altering a Confirming Act. (Note: Local Government Board's Provisional Orders Confirmation (No. 8) Act 1884 (47 & 48 Vict. c. ccxv))	
	Great Harwood Order 1886 Provisional Order for partially repealing a Confirming Act. (Note: Local Government Supplemental Act 1867 (No. 5) (30 & 31 Vict. c. 83))	
	Leek Order 1886 Provisional Order for altering the Leek Improvement Act, 1855. (Note: Leek Improvement Act 1855 (18 & 19 Vict. c. cxxxii))	
	Bognor Order (1) 1886 Provisional Order to enable the Sanitary Authority for the Urban Sanitary District of Bognor to put in force the Compulsory Clauses of the Lands Clauses Consolidation Acts.	
	Bognor Order (2) 1886 Provisional Order for altering a Confirming Act.	
	Shepton Mallet Order 1886 Provisional Order for altering the area of the Local Government District of Shepton Mallet.	
	Weston-super-Mare Order 1886 Provisional Order for altering a Local Act. (Note: Weston-super-Mare Improvement and Market Act 1842 (5 & 6 Vict. c. xx))	
Local Government Board's Provisional Orders Confirmation (No. 2) Act 1886	49 & 50 Vict. c. xviii	4 June 1886
An Act to confirm certain Provisional Orders of the Local Government Board relating to the City and Borough of Bath, the Borough of Harrogate, the Local Government District of Hendon, the Boroughs of Plymouth and Ramsgate, the Local Government District of Reddish, and the Borough of Shrewsbury.
	Bath Order 1886 Provisional Order to enable the Urban Sanitary Authority for the City and Borough of Bath to put in force the Compulsory Clauses of the Lands Clauses Consolidation Acts.	
	Harrogate Order 1886 Provisional Order to enable the Urban Sanitary Authority for the Borough of Harrogate to put in force the Compulsory Clauses of the Lands Clauses Consolidation Acts.	
	Hendon Order 1886 Provisional Order to enable the Sanitary Authority for the Urban Sanitary District of Hendon to put in force the Compulsory Clauses of the Lands Clauses Consolidation Acts.	
	Plymouth Order 1886 Provisional Order to enable the Urban Sanitary Authority for the Borough of Plymouth to put in force the Compulsory Clauses of the Lands Clauses Consolidation Acts.	
	Ramsgate Order 1886 Provisional Order to enable the Urban Sanitary Authority for the Borough of Ramsgate to put in force the Compulsory Clauses of the Lands Clauses Consolidation Acts.	
	Reddish Order 1886 Provisional Order to enable the Sanitary Authority for the Urban Sanitary District of Reddish to put in force the Compulsory Clauses of the Lands Clauses Consolidation Acts.	
	Shrewsbury Order 1886 Provisional Order to enable the Urban Sanitary Authority for the Borough of Shrewsbury to put in force the Compulsory Clauses of the Lands Clauses Consolidation Acts.	
Local Government Board's Provisional Order Confirmation (Poor Law) Act 1886	49 & 50 Vict. c. xix	4 June 1886
An Act to confirm a Provisional Order of the Local Government Board under the provisions of the Poor Law Amendment Act, 1867, (Note: Poor Law Amendment Act 1867 (30 & 31 Vict. c. 106)) as extended by the Poor Law Act, 1879, (Note: Poor Law Act 1879 (42 & 43 Vict. c. 54)) relating to the Townships of Manchester and Hulme.
	Manchester and Hulme Order 1886 Provisional Order for altering the Manchester Overseers Act, 1858. (Note: Manchester Overseers Act 1858 (21 & 22 Vict. c. lxii))	
Local Government Board's Provisional Orders Confirmation (Poor Law) (No. 2) Act 1886	49 & 50 Vict. c. xx	4 June 1886
An Act to confirm certain Orders of the Local Government Board under the provisions of the Divided Parishes and Poor Law Amendment Act, 1876, (Note: Divided Parishes and Poor Law Amendment Act 1876 (39 & 40 Vict. c. 61)) as amended and extended by the Poor Law Act, 1879, relating to the Parishes of Glinton, Greetwell, Mappleton, Maxey, Newborough, Northborough, Okeover, Peakirk, Snelston, Thorpe, and Willingham Cherry; to the Townships of Alkmonton, Biggin, Calwich, Clifton and Compton, Ellastone, Hollington, Hulland, Longford, Mayfield, Newball, Newton Grange, Prestwood, Rand, and Shirley; to the Chapelries of Bullington and Fulnetby; and to the Liberty of Offcote and Underwood.
	Alkmonton, &c. Order 1886 Ashbourne Union.	
	Bullington, &c. Order 1886 Lincoln Union.	
	Glinton, Maxey, Newborough, Northborough, and Peakirk Order 1886 Peterborough Union.	
Local Government Board's Provisional Orders Confirmation (Poor Law) (No. 3) Act 1886	49 & 50 Vict. c. xxi	4 June 1886
An Act to confirm certain Orders of the Local Government Board under the provisions of the Divided Parishes and Poor Law Amendment Act, 1876, as amended and extended by the Poor Law Act, 1879, relating to the Parishes of Ashburnham (two), Brightling, Catsfield, Dallington (two), Hartwell, Ninfield, Stoke Mandeville, and Warbleton.
	Ashburnham, Brightling, and Dallington Order 1886 Battle Union.	
	Ashburnham, Catsfield, Dallington, Ninfield, and Warbleton Order 1886 Battle and Hailsham Union.	
	Hartwell and Stoke Mandeville Order 1886 Wycombe and Aylesbury Unions.	
Local Government Board's Provisional Orders Confirmation (Poor Law) (No. 4) Act 1886	49 & 50 Vict. c. xxii	4 June 1886
An Act to confirm certain Orders of the Local Government Board under the provisions of the Divided Parishes and Poor Law Amendment Act, 1876, as amended and extended by the Poor Law Act, 1879, relating to the Parishes of Blandford-Saint-Mary, Bryanston, Charlton-Adam, Charlton-Mackrell, Compton-Dundon, King-Weston, Llangynog, Llanrhaidr-yn-Mochnant (Montgomery), Llanrhaidr-yn-Mochnant (Denbigh), Pennant, Pimpeme, Steepleton Preston, Tarrant-Keynston, Tarrant-Rushton, Turnworth, Winterbourne-Clenston, and Winterborne-Stickland.
	Blandford St. Mary, &c. Order 1886 Blandford Union.	
	Charlton Adam, &c. Order 1886 Langport Union.	
	Llangynog, &c. Order 1886 Llanfyllin Union.	
Local Government Board's Provisional Orders Confirmation (Poor Law) (No. 5) Act 1886	49 & 50 Vict. c. xxiii	4 June 1886
An Act to confirm certain Orders of the Local Government Board under the provisions of the Divided Parishes and Poor Law Amendment Act, 1876, as amended and extended by the Poor Law Act, 1879, relating to the Parishes of Beaumont, Crosby-upon-Eden, Saint-Cuthbert's-Without (Carlisle), and Stanwix; and to the Townships of Cassop, East Heddon, Fawdon, Newburn, Newburn-Hall. Quarrington, South Gosforth, Throckley, and Wallbottle.
	Beaumont, &c. Order 1886 Carlisle Union.	
	East Heddon, &c. Order 1886 Castle Ward Union.	
	Cassop and Quarrington Order 1886 Durham Union.	
Local Government Board's Provisional Orders Confirmation (Poor Law) (No. 6) Act 1886	49 & 50 Vict. c. xxiv	4 June 1886
An Act to confirm certain Orders of the Local Government Board under the provisions of the Divided Parishes and Poor Law Amendment Act, 1876, as amended and extended by the Poor Law Act, 1879, relating to the Parish of Marton-with-Moxby; to the Townships of Ampleforth-Birdforth, Ampleforth-Oswaldkirk, Ampleforth-Saint-Peter, Ayton West, Burniston, Byland (Coxwold), Cloughton, Harwooddale, Husthwaite, Hutton-Bushel, Oswaldkirk, Scalby, Silpho, Thornton-with-Baxly, and Wass; and to the Chapelry of Farlington.
	Farlington, &c. Order 1886 Easingwold Union.	
	Ampleforth Order 1886 Helmsley Blackmoor Union.	
	Byland (Coxwold) and Wass Order 1886 Helmsley Blackmoor Union.	
	Ayton West, &c. Order 1886 Scarborough Union.	
Morecambe Tramways Act 1886	49 & 50 Vict. c. xxv	4 June 1886
An Act for incorporating and conferring powers on the Morecambe Tramways Company.
East and West India Dock Company's Act 1886 (repealed)	49 & 50 Vict. c. xxvi	4 June 1886
An Act to authorise the East and West India Dock Company to consolidate their Debenture Stock and to raise further Money, and for other purposes. (Repealed by Port of London (Consolidation) Act 1920 (10 & 11 Geo. 5. c. clxxiii))
Leamington Corporation Act 1886 (repealed)	49 & 50 Vict. c. xxvii	4 June 1886
An Act to empower the Corporation of Royal Leamington Spa in the County of Warwick to raise Money for the Improvement of their Pump Room Baths and Pleasure Grounds; and for other purposes. (Repealed by Warwick District Council Act 1984 (c. xxiv))
Pewsey and Salisbury Railway (Extension of Time) Act 1886 (repealed)	49 & 50 Vict. c. xxviii	4 June 1886
An Act to confer further Powers on the Pewsey and Salisbury Railway Company. (Repealed by Pewsey and Salisbury Railway (Abandonment) Act 1891 (54 & 55 Vict. c. x))
Radstock, Wrington and Congresbury Junction Railway (Abandonment) Act 1886 (repealed)	49 & 50 Vict. c. xxix	4 June 1886
An Act for the abandonment of the Radstock, Wrington and Congresbury Junction Railway. (Repealed by Statute Law (Repeals) Act 2013 (c. 2))
Solihull Gas Act 1886	49 & 50 Vict. c. xxx	4 June 1886
An Act for incorporating and conferring powers on the Solihull Gas Company.
Nuneaton Gas Act 1886	49 & 50 Vict. c. xxxi	4 June 1886
An Act for incorporating and conferring powers on the Nuneaton Gaslight and Coke Company Limited.
Newport (Monmouthshire) Gas Act 1886	49 & 50 Vict. c. xxxii	4 June 1886
An Act to authorise the Newport (Monmouthshire) Gas Company to raise additional Capital; to extend their limits for the supply of Gas; and for other purposes.
Kirkcaldy and Dysart Waterworks Act 1886 (repealed)	49 & 50 Vict. c. xxxiii	4 June 1886
An Act to authorise the Waterworks Commissioners of Kirkcaldy and Dysart to raise additional Money; and for other purposes. (Repealed by Kirkcaldy Corporation Order Confirmation Act 1939 (2 & 3 Geo. 6. c. vi))
Tyne Improvement Act 1886	49 & 50 Vict. c. xxxiv	4 June 1886
An Act for conferring further powers on the Tyne Improvement Commissioners and for amending certain of the Tyne Improvement Acts; and for other purposes.
Bridlington Gas Act 1886	49 & 50 Vict. c. xxxv	4 June 1886
An Act for incorporating and conferring powers on the Bridlington Gas Company.
Loughborough Local Board Act 1886	49 & 50 Vict. c. xxxvi	4 June 1886
An Act to authorise the Loughborough Local Board to construct works for obtaining a further supply of Water and to borrow further money and to extend the limits within which the Local Board may supply Water; and for other purposes.
London Brighton and South Coast Railway (Various Powers) Act 1886	49 & 50 Vict. c. xxxvii	4 June 1886
An Act to confer further powers on the London Brighton and South Coast Railway Company.
Midland Great Western Railway of Ireland Act 1886 (repealed)	49 & 50 Vict. c. xxxviii	4 June 1886
An Act to confer further powers on the Midland Great Western Railway of Ireland Company and for other purposes. (Repealed by Statute Law (Repeals) Act 2013 (c. 2))
Barry Dock and Railways Act 1886 (repealed)	49 & 50 Vict. c. xxxix	4 June 1886
An Act to confer further powers on the Barry Dock and Railways Company. (Repealed by Vale of Glamorgan (Barry Harbour) Act 1978 (c. xvii))
London, Chatham and Dover Railway Act 1886	49 & 50 Vict. c. xl	4 June 1886
An Act to confer further powers on the London Chatham and Dover Railway Company and for other purposes.
Great Northern Railway (Ireland) Act 1886	49 & 50 Vict. c. xli	4 June 1886
An Act to enable the Great Northern Railway Company (Ireland) to purchase the Newry Warrenpoint and Rostrevor Railway and to confer further powers on the said Company and on other companies in relation to the undertaking of that Company; and for other purposes.
Scinde, Punjaub and Delhi Railway Purchase Act 1886 (repealed)	49 & 50 Vict. c. xlii	4 June 1886
An Act to provide for the vesting of the undertaking of the Scinde, Punjaub and Delhi Railway Company in the Secretary of State in Council of India; and for other purposes. (Repealed by Statute Law (Repeals) Act 2013 (c. 2))
Wrexham Gas Act 1886	49 & 50 Vict. c. xliii	4 June 1886
An Act for the granting of further powers to the Wrexham Gas Light Company.
Rhondda and Swansea Bay Railway Act 1886	49 & 50 Vict. c. xliv	4 June 1886
An Act to authorise the Rhondda and Swansea Bay Railway Company to construct new and substituted Railways to abandon the construction of portions of their authorised Railways and to amend the Acts relating to the Company and for other purposes.
Brighton and Dyke Railway Act 1886	49 & 50 Vict. c. xlv	4 June 1886
An Act to enlarge the time for opening the Brighton and Dyke Railway for the public conveyance of passengers.
Ballymena and Portglenone Railway and Ballymena and Ahoghill Tramways (Abandonment) Act 1886	49 & 50 Vict. c. xlvi	4 June 1886
An Act to authorise the Abandonment of the Railway authorised by the Ballymena and Portglenone Railway Act 1879 (Note: Ballymena and Portglenone Railway Act 1879 (42 & 43 Vict. c. ccx)) and the Tramways authorised by the Ballymena and Ahoghill Tramways Act 1885. (Note: Ballymena and Ahoghill Tramways Act 1885 (48 & 49 Vict. c. cxciii))
Marple Local Board Gas Act 1886	49 & 50 Vict. c. xlvii	4 June 1886
An Act to authorise the transfer of the undertaking of the Marple Gas Company Limited to the Marple Local Board and for other purposes.
Liverpool United Gaslight Company's Act 1886	49 & 50 Vict. c. xlviii	4 June 1886
An Act to enable the Liverpool United Gaslight Company to purchase additional lands and to erect Gasworks thereon to raise further money and for other purposes.
Falkirk Drainage Act 1886	49 & 50 Vict. c. xlix	4 June 1886
An Act to authorise the magistrates and council of the burgh of Falkirk to intercept the Sewage of the burgh and convey the same to the River Carron; and to make and maintain new Drainage Works; and for other purposes.
Lanarkshire and Ayrshire Railway Act 1886	49 & 50 Vict. c. l	4 June 1886
An Act to confer further powers on the Lanarkshire and Ayrshire Railway Company and for other purposes.
Post Office (Sites) Act 1886	49 & 50 Vict. c. li	25 June 1886
An Act to enable Her Majesty’s Postmaster-General to acquire Lands in Birmingham for the Public Service.
South Wales Roads (Abergavenny and Merthyr) Act 1886 or the Turnpike Roads (South Wales) Act 1886	49 & 50 Vict. c. lii	25 June 1886
An Act to further amend the Law relating to Turnpike Roads in South Wales.
Westminster Abbey Act 1886	49 & 50 Vict. c. liii	25 June 1886
An Act to enable the Ecclesiastical Commissioners to make an advance to the Dean and Chapter of Westminster for the restoration and repair of Westminster Abbey.
Local Government Board (Ireland) Provisional Orders Confirmation (Dromore West and Kilrush) Act 1886	49 & 50 Vict. c. liv	25 June 1886
An Act to confirm certain Provisional Orders of the Local Government Board for Ireland relating to Dromore West and Kilrush Unions.
	Dromore West Union. Easky Burial Ground. Provisional Order.	
	Town of Kilrush. Provisional.	
Local Government Board (Ireland) Provisional Order Confirmation (Fermoy) Act 1886	49 & 50 Vict. c. lv	25 June 1886
An Act to confirm a Provisional Order of the Local Government Board for Ireland relating to the Town of Fermoy.
	Town of Fermoy. Provisional Order.	
Gas Orders Confirmation (No. 1) Act 1886	49 & 50 Vict. c. lvi	25 June 1886
An Act to confirm certain Provisional Orders made by the Board of Trade under the Gas and Water Works Facilities Act, 1870, (Note: Gas and Water Works Facilities Act 1870 (33 & 34 Vict. c. 70)) relating to Chertsey Gas, Loughborough Gas, Melksham Gas, Menai Bridge Gas, and Pocklington Gas.
	Chertsey Gas Order 1886 Order empowering the Chertsey Gas Consumers' Company (Limited) to raise additional capital, and to borrow money, and for other purposes.	
	Loughborough Gas Order 1886 Order empowering the Loughborough Gas Company to raise additional capital, and for other purposes.	
	Melksham Gas Order 1886 Order empowering the Melksham Gas Light and Coke Company, (Limited) to maintain and continue their gasworks at Melksham, in the county of Wilts, and to make and supply gas in the town and parish of Melksham, the tithing of Shaw and Whitley, and the parishes of Seend, Atworth, and Broughton Gifford, all in the said county.	
	Menai Bridge Gas Order 1886 Order conferring powers for the maintenance and continuance of gasworks, and for the manufacture and supply of gas to Menai Bridge, and other places, in the parish of Llandysilio, in the county of Anglesey.	
	Pocklington Gas Order 1886 Order empowering the Pocklington Gaslight and Coke Company (Limited) to maintain and continue gasworks and to manufacture and supply gas within the township of Pocklington in the east riding of the county of York.	
Drainage and Improvement of Lands Supplemental (Ireland) (No. 2) Act 1886	49 & 50 Vict. c. lvii	25 June 1886
An Act to confirm certain Provisional Orders under the Drainage and Improvement of Lands (Ireland) Act, 1863, and the Acts amending the same, relating to the Upper Nanny River Drainage District in the County of Meath, and the Greanagh River Drainage District in the County of Limerick.
	In the Matter of the Upper Nanny River Drainage District, in the County of Meath.	
	In the Matter of the Greanagh River Drainage District, in the County of Limerick.	
Municipal Corporation (Scheme Confirmation) Act 1886	49 & 50 Vict. c. lviii	25 June 1886
An Act to confirm a Scheme made by a Committee of the Lords of Her Majesty’s Privy Council under the Municipal Corporations Act, 1882, (Note: Municipal Corporations Act 1882 (45 & 46 Vict. c. 50)) relating to Higham Ferrers.
	Scheme for Higham Ferrers.	
Gas and Water Orders Confirmation Act 1886	49 & 50 Vict. c. lix	25 June 1886
An Act to confirm certain Provisional Orders made by the Board of Trade under the Gas and Water Works Facilities Act, 1870, relating to Bridport Water, Deal Water, Kettering Water, Southwold Water, and Lyndhurst Gas and Water.
	Bridport Water Order 1886 Order empowering the Bridgeport Waterworks Company to borrow a further sum of Money and to construct additional Waterworks.	
	Deal Water Order 1886 Order empowering the Company of Proprietors of the Deal Waterworks to raise additional Capital.	
	Kettering Waterworks Order 1886 Order empowering the Kettering Waterworks Company, Limited, to construct new and additional Waterworks in the Parishes of Kettering, Weekley, and Warkton, in the County of Northampton, and to extend the limits of their Water Supply, and to raise additional Capital.	
	Southwold Water Order 1886 Order authorising the Construction and Maintenance of Waterworks and the Supply of Water to the Borough of Southwold, in the County of Suffolk.	
	Lyndhurst Gas and Water Order 1886 Order empowering the Lyndhurst Gas and Water Company, Limited, to construct and maintain Gasworks and Waterworks, and to make and supply Gas and to supply Water within the Parishes of Lyndhurst and Minstead, in the County of Southampton.	
Water Orders Confirmation Act 1886	49 & 50 Vict. c. lx	25 June 1886
An Act to confirm certain Provisional Orders made by the Board of Trade under the Gas and Water Works Facilities Act, 1870, relating to Cranleigh Water, Farnham Water, Frith Hill, Godalming, and Farncombe Water, Howden Water, and Tonbridge Water.
	Cranleigh Water Order 1886 Order empowering the Cranleigh Water Company Limited to construct and maintain Waterworks and to supply Water in the Parish of Cranleigh and part of the Parish of Wonersh, all in the County of Surrey.	
	Farnham Water Order 1886 Order authorising the maintenance and continuance of Waterworks and the supply of water in and to the parish of Farnham, in the county of Surrey.	
	Howden Water Order 1886 Order empowering the Frith Hill, Godalming, and Farncombe Water Company, Limited, to construct additional Waterworks; to extend their Limits of Supply; and to raise additional Capital.	
	Tonbridge Water Order 1886 Order conferring powers for the maintenance, continuance and extension of Waterworks and the supply of Water within certain parts of the parishes of Tonbridge, Leigh, and Shipbourne, all in the county of Kent.	
Local Government Board's Provisional Orders Confirmation (No. 4) Act 1886	49 & 50 Vict. c. lxi	25 June 1886
An Act to confirm certain Provisional Orders of the Local Government Board relating to the Burnley Joint Hospital District, the Local Government District of Buxton, the Church and Clayton-le-Moors Joint Cemetery District, the Local Government Districts of East Ham and Llangollen, and the Boroughs of Halifax and West Bromwich (two).
	Burnley Order 1886 Provisional Order for forming a United District under Section 279 of the Public Health Act, 1875. (Note: Public Health Act 1875 (38 & 39 Vict. c. 55))	
	Buxton Order 1886 Provisional Order for altering certain Local Acts. (Note: Buxton Gas Act 1870 (33 & 34 Vict. c. lxviii)) (Note: Buxton Local Board Act 1873 (36 & 37 Vict. c. lvi))	
	Church and Clayton-le-Moors Order 1886 Provisional Order for forming a United District under Section 279 of the Public Health Act, 1875.	
	East Ham Order 1886 Provisional Order for extending the Local Government District of East Ham.	
	Llangollen Order 1886 Provisional Order for partially repealing a Confirming Act. (Note: Local Government Supplemental Act 1865 (28 & 29 Vict. c. 24))	
	Halifax Order 1886 Provisional Order for altering the Halifax Corporation Act, 1882. (Note: Halifax Corporation Act 1882 (45 & 46 Vict. c. ccxxxiv))	
	West Bromwich Order (1) 1886 Provisional Order for altering the West Bromwich Improvement (Gas) Act, 1876. (Note: West Bromwich Improvement (Gas) Act 1876 (39 & 40 Vict. c. cxlix))	
	West Bromwich Order (2) 1886 Provisional Order to enable the Urban Sanitary Authority for the Borough of West Bromwich to put in force the Compulsory Clauses of the Lands Clauses Consolidation Acts.	
Secretary for Scotland's Leith Provisional Order Confirmation Act 1886 (repealed)	49 & 50 Vict. c. lxii	25 June 1886
An Act to confirm an Order of the Secretary for Scotland under the provisions of the General Police and Improvement (Scotland) Act, 1862, (Note: General Police and Improvement (Scotland) Act 1862 (25 & 26 Vict. c. 101)) relating to the Burgh of Leith. (Repealed by Edinburgh Corporation Order Confirmation Act 1933 (24 & 25 Geo. 5. c. v))
Tramways Order in Council (Ireland) (Cork, Coachford and Blarney) Confirmation Act 1886	49 & 50 Vict. c. lxiii	25 June 1886
An Act to confirm an Order in Council of the Lord Lieutenant and Privy Council in Ireland relating to the Cork, Coachford, and Blarney Light Railway.
	Cork, Coachford and Blarney Light Railway Order 1885 (Note: Although passed in 1886, the short title is specified as the Cork, Coachford and Blarney Light Railway Order 1885.) The Cork, Coachford and Blarney Light Railway Order, 1885.	
Brighton Corporation Loans Act 1886 (repealed)	49 & 50 Vict. c. lxiv	25 June 1886
An Act to authorise the Mayor Aldermen and Burgesses of the borough of Brighton to consolidate their Loans and create Corporation Stock and for other purposes. (Repealed by Brighton Corporation Act 1931 (21 & 22 Geo. 5. c. cix))
Swansea Harbour Act 1886	49 & 50 Vict. c. lxv	25 June 1886
An Act to enable the Swansea Harbour Trustees to construct and maintain additional Works and conveniences within Swansea Harbour; to raise further Money and to issue Stock; and for other purposes.
Sligo and Bundoran Tramway (Release of Deposit) Act 1886	49 & 50 Vict. c. lxvi	25 June 1886
An Act to authorise the release of the Deposit with the Supreme Court of Judicature in Ireland in respect of the Sligo and Bundoran Tramway.
Ripon Corporation Act 1886	49 & 50 Vict. c. lxvii	25 June 1886
An Act to empower the Corporation of Ripon to make additional Waterworks and to make better provision for the regulation of their Markets and Fairs and for the Health and local Government of the City and for other purposes.
Burgess Hill Water Act 1886 (repealed)	49 & 50 Vict. c. lxviii	25 June 1886
An Act for dissolving the Burgess Hill and Saint John's Common Water Company (Limited) for re-incorporating the proprietors therein with others and for conferring powers on the Company so to be incorporated and for other purposes. (Repealed by Mid-Sussex Water Order 1985 (SI 1985/513))
South Shields Gas Act 1886 (repealed)	49 & 50 Vict. c. lxix	25 June 1886
An Act to confer further powers on the South Shields Gas Company; and for other purposes. (Repealed by Newcastle-upon-Tyne and Gateshead Gas Order 1937 (SR&O 1937/1186))
Wallasey Tramways Act 1886	49 & 50 Vict. c. lxx	25 June 1886
An Act to authorise the Wallasey Tramways Company to abandon parts of their authorised tramways and for other purposes.
Lambeth Waterworks Act 1886	49 & 50 Vict. c. lxxi	25 June 1886
An Act to extend the powers of the Company of Proprietors of Lambeth Waterworks.
Eastbourne, Seaford and Newhaven Railway Act 1886 (repealed)	49 & 50 Vict. c. lxxii	25 June 1886
An Act for the making and maintaining of the Eastbourne Seaford and Newhaven Railway and for other purposes. (Repealed by Eastbourne, Seaford and Newhaven Railway (Abandonment) Act 1892 (55 & 56 Vict. c. lxxix))
Oswestry and Llangynog Railway Act 1886 (repealed)	49 & 50 Vict. c. lxxiii	25 June 1886
An Act to revive the Powers and extend the Periods for the Compulsory Purchase of Lands for and the Construction of the Oswestry and Llangynog Railway. (Repealed by Oswestry and Llangynog Railway (Abandonment) Act 1889 (52 & 53 Vict. c. lxxxi))
Alliance Assurance Company's Act 1886	49 & 50 Vict. c. lxxiv	25 June 1886
An Act to change the name of the Alliance British and Foreign Life and Fire Assurance Company, and to make provisions with respect to its capital, and for other purposes.
Commercial Union Assurance Company Act 1886 (repealed)	49 & 50 Vict. c. lxxv	25 June 1886
An Act to make better provision for vesting the securities and property of the Commercial Union Assurance Company (Limited) in the Trustees of the Company and for other purposes. (Repealed by Commercial Union Assurance Company Act 1908 (8 Edw. 7. c. lxvii))
Caledonian Railway Act 1886	49 & 50 Vict. c. lxxvi	25 June 1886
An Act for extending the time for completing certain works of the Caledonian Railway Company in the counties of Lanark and Stirling; for abandoning certain of their authorised lines, and sanctioning a line already constructed, in the county of Lanark; for enabling them to construct a drain in connexion with their Gourock Branch; for authorising agreements respecting their bridge over the Tay at Perth; for conferring on them additional powers with respect to the harbour at Grangemouth; for confirming an agreement made by them with the North British Railway Company; and for other purposes.
Taff Vale Railway Act 1886	49 & 50 Vict. c. lxxvii	25 June 1886
An Act to confer further Powers upon the Taff Vale Railway Company and for other purposes.
Ashton-under-Lyne Improvement Act 1886	49 & 50 Vict. c. lxxviii	25 June 1886
An Act to confer further Powers on the Mayor Aldermen and Burgesses of the Borough of Ashton-under-Lyne for the Improvement and good Government of the Borough and for other purposes.
Cleator and Workington Junction Railway Act 1886	49 & 50 Vict. c. lxxix	25 June 1886
An Act to confer further Powers upon the Cleator and Workington Junction Railway Company; and for other purposes.
Liverpool Improvement Act 1886 (repealed)	49 & 50 Vict. c. lxxx	25 June 1886
An Act to empower the Corporation of Liverpool to improve the street known as Islington, to contribute to the enlargement of the Liverpool Royal Infirmary, to acquire the Netherfield Road Hospital; and for other purposes. (Repealed by Liverpool Corporation Act 1921 (11 & 12 Geo. 5. c. lxxiv))
East and West Yorkshire Union Railways Act 1886	49 & 50 Vict. c. lxxxi	25 June 1886
An Act to authorise the East and West Yorkshire Union Railways Company to abandon certain of their authorised Railways and to construct other Railways in substitution therefor and to execute further works and to extend the time for the compulsory purchase of lands for and for the completion of their unabandoned Railways; and for other purposes.
East London Waterworks Act 1886	49 & 50 Vict. c. lxxxii	25 June 1886
An Act to authorise the East London Waterworks Company to execute further works and to raise further money in order to enable them to fulfil their Statutory obligations relating to the supply of water or otherwise and to meet the increased demand for water within their district to amend the Acts relating to that Company; and for other purposes.
Leeds Hydraulic Power Act 1886	49 & 50 Vict. c. lxxxiii	25 June 1886
An Act for incorporating and conferring powers upon the Leeds Hydraulic Power Company and for other purposes.
London, Tilbury and Southend Railway Act 1886	49 & 50 Vict. c. lxxxiv	25 June 1886
An Act to confer further Powers on the London Tilbury and Southend Railway Company.
Southwark and Vauxhall Water Act 1886	49 & 50 Vict. c. lxxxv	25 June 1886
An Act for empowering the Southwark and Vauxhall Water Company to construct additional works and to raise additional capital and for other purposes.
Bute Docks (Transfer) Act 1886	49 & 50 Vict. c. lxxxvi	25 June 1886
An Act to incorporate the Bute Docks Company; and to transfer to the Company so incorporated the Bute Docks Undertaking; and for other purposes.
Bexley Heath Railway Act 1886	49 & 50 Vict. c. lxxxvii	25 June 1886
An Act to authorise the Bexley Heath Railway Company to make a new road and sewer in connection with their authorised railway and to extend the time for the purchase of land and completion of that railway and for other purposes.
Dore and Chinley Railway Act 1886	49 & 50 Vict. c. lxxxviii	25 June 1886
An Act to amend the Dore and Chinley Railway Acts 1884 (Note: Dore and Chinley Railway Act 1884 (47 & 48 Vict. c. clxxxi)) and 1885 (Note: Dore and Chinley Railway Act 1885 (48 & 49 Vict. c. xliv)) and for other purposes.
Girvan and Portpatrick Junction Railway Act 1886	49 & 50 Vict. c. lxxxix	25 June 1886
An Act to confer further powers on the Girvan and Portpatrick Junction Railway Company and for other purposes.
Gilbert Earl of Shrewsbury's Sheffield Hospital Act 1886	49 & 50 Vict. c. xc	25 June 1886
An Act for authorising the election of Out-pensioners of the Hospital of Gilbert Earl of Shrewsbury at Sheffield.in the County of York and for conferring larger powers of dealing with the income of the said Hospital; and for other purposes.
Rowley Regis and Blackheath Gas Act 1886	49 & 50 Vict. c. xci	25 June 1886
An Act for incorporating and conferring powers on the Rowley Regis and Blackheath Gas Company and for other purposes.
Uxbridge and Rickmansworth Railway Act 1886 (repealed)	49 & 50 Vict. c. xcii	25 June 1886
An Act to authorise a deviation of part of the Uxbridge and Rickmansworth Railway; to extend the time for completion; to enable the Company to raise further Capital; and for other purposes. (Repealed by Uxbridge and Rickmansworth Railway (Abandonment) Act 1888 (51 & 52 Vict. c. x))
Cambridge University and Town Waterworks Act 1886	49 & 50 Vict. c. xciii	25 June 1886
An Act to authorise the Cambridge University and Town Waterworks Company to construct additional Waterworks and to raise further Money and for other purposes.
Nottingham Suburban Railway Act 1886	49 & 50 Vict. c. xciv	25 June 1886
An Act to incorporate a company for the construction of the Nottingham Suburban Railway; and for other purposes.
Sidmouth Water Act 1886	49 & 50 Vict. c. xcv	25 June 1886
An Act for incorporating the Sidmouth Water Company and empowering them to acquire and construct Works and supply Water; and for other purposes.
Bristol Dock Act 1886	49 & 50 Vict. c. xcvi	25 June 1886
An Act to enable the Mayor Aldermen and Burgesses of the City of Bristol to construct additional Dock Works and for other purposes.
Hull Barnsley and West Riding Junction Railway and Dock Act 1886	49 & 50 Vict. c. xcvii	25 June 1886
An Act to authorise the Hull Barnsley and West Riding Junction Railway and Dock Company to abandon certain works authorised by the Hull Barnsley and West Riding Junction Railway and Dock (Various Powers) Act 1883 (Note: Hull, Barnsley and West Riding Junction Railway and Dock (Various Powers) Act 1883 (46 & 47 Vict. c. cxliii)) to raise further money by preference shares or stock and for other purposes.
Ardrossan Gas and Water Act 1886	49 & 50 Vict. c. xcviii	25 June 1886
An Act for dissolving the Ardrossan Gas and Water Company, Limited, and re-incorporating the Members thereof with others; and for enabling them to make and maintain additional waterworks, and to supply Gas and Water within places in the Parish of Ardrossan, in the County of Ayr; and for other purposes.
Glasgow and South Western Railway Act 1886	49 & 50 Vict. c. xcix	25 June 1886
An Act for conferring further Powers on the Glasgow and South-western Railway Company; for converting and consolidating certain classes of their Shares and Stocks; and for empowering them to raise additional Capital; and for other purposes.
Brighton, Rottingdean and Newhaven Direct Railway Act 1886 (repealed)	49 & 50 Vict. c. c	25 June 1886
An Act for making a railway from Brighton to Rottingdean and Newhaven in the county of Sussex and for other purposes. (Repealed by Brighton, Rottingdean and Newhaven Direct Railway (Abandonment) Act 1894 (57 & 58 Vict. c. cxliv))
Tendring Hundred Waterworks Act 1886	49 & 50 Vict. c. ci	25 June 1886
An Act to empower the Tendring Hundred Waterworks Company to construct additional Waterworks; to extend their limits for the supply of Water; to raise further capital; and for other purposes.
Bute Docks (Further Powers) Act 1886	49 & 50 Vict. c. cii	25 June 1886
An Act for conferring on the Trustees and others claiming under the Will of the late Marquess of Bute further Powers for the construction of Works in connexion with the Bute Docks at Cardiff and for amending the Bute Docks Acts and for other purposes.
Burnley, Clitheroe and Sabden Railway Act 1886 (repealed)	49 & 50 Vict. c. ciii	25 June 1886
An Act to authorise the construction of Railways in Lancashire to be called the Burnley Clitheroe and Sabden Railway and for other purposes. (Repealed by Burnley, Clitheroe and Sabden Railway (Abandonment) Act 1890 (53 & 54 Vict. c. xxxiv))
Harrow Road and Paddington Tramways Act 1886	49 & 50 Vict. c. civ	25 June 1886
An Act for incorporating the Harrow Road and Paddington Tramways Company and for empowering them to construct Tramways, and for other purposes.
Glasgow Bridges, &c. Act 1886	49 & 50 Vict. c. cv	25 June 1886
An Act to vest the Glasgow Bridges in the Magistrates and Council of Glasgow; to widen Glasgow Bridge; and for other purposes.
Great Western Railway Act 1886	49 & 50 Vict. c. cvi	25 June 1886
An Act for conferring further powers upon the Great Western Railway Company in connexion with their own and other Undertakings and upon them and other Companies in connexion with Undertakings in which they are jointly interested; for vesting in the Great Western Railway Company the Undertaking of the Faringdon Railway Company; for authorising and confirming Agreements with other Companies and with the Corporation of Chester; and for other purposes.
Guildford Corporation Act 1886 (repealed)	49 & 50 Vict. c. cvii	25 June 1886
An Act to extend the boundaries of the Borough of Guildford to confer further powers upon the Corporation of Guildford with respect to their Water Undertaking to make further provision for the good government of the Borough and for other purposes. (Repealed by Surrey Act 1985 (c. iii))
Harrow and Stanmore Railway Act 1886	49 & 50 Vict. c. cviii	25 June 1886
An Act for authorising the construction of a Railway between Harrow and Stanmore, in the County of Middlesex, to be called the Harrow and Stanmore Railway; and for other purposes.
Lee Purification Act 1886	49 & 50 Vict. c. cix	25 June 1886
An Act to authorise the construction of a Sewer and other Works for preventing the discharge into the River Lee of effluent Water or Sewage matter from the Sewerage Works of the Tottenham Local Board of Health and for other purposes.
South Western Railway Act 1886	49 & 50 Vict. c. cx	25 June 1886
An Act for the abandonment of part of the authorised Kingston and London Railway and of lines connected therewith for transferring to and vesting in the London and South-western Railway Company alone the powers for making the unabandoned part of the Kingston and London Railway to authorise the transfer to the last-mentioned Company of the undertaking and powers of the Wimbledon and West Metropolitan Junction Railway Company to extend the periods limited for the purchase of lands and for the completion of the Wimbledon and West Metropolitan Junction Railway and for the completion of the unabandoned portion of the Kingston and London Railway to authorise the London and South-western Railway Company to make a new Railway at Wimbledon and to acquire the undertakings of the Swanage and Bodmin and Wadebridge Railway Companies to make further provision as to the Southsea Railway; and for other purposes.
Manchester Ship Canal Act 1886 (repealed)	49 & 50 Vict. c. cxi	25 June 1886
An Act to amend the Manchester Ship Canal Act, 1885. (Note: Manchester Ship Canal Act 1885 (48 & 49 Vict. c. clxxxviii)) (Repealed by Manchester Ship Canal Harbour Revision Order 2009 (SI 2009/2579))
Metropolitan Board of Works (Various Powers) Act 1886	49 & 50 Vict. c. cxii	25 June 1886
An Act to confer further powers on the Metropolitan Board of Works as to streets and open spaces; and for other purposes.
Midland Railway Act 1886	49 & 50 Vict. c. cxiii	25 June 1886
An Act to confer Additional Powers upon the Midland Railway Company for the Construction of Works and the Acquisition of Lands and otherwise in connexion with their own and other Undertakings, and for other purposes.
Mountain Ash Local Board Act 1886	49 & 50 Vict. c. cxiv	25 June 1886
An Act to empower the Mountain Ash Local Board to construct Gas and Water Works and to supply Gas and Water within their District to purchase certain existing Gas and Waterworks and the Workman's Hall Mountain Ash to transfer the St. Margaret's Burial Ground to the Local Board and for other purposes.
Stapenhill Bridge Act 1886	49 & 50 Vict. c. cxv	25 June 1886
An Act for making and maintaining a Bridge across the River Trent at Stapenhill Ferry and for other purposes.
South Hampshire Railway and Pier Act 1886	49 & 50 Vict. c. cxvi	25 June 1886
An Act to incorporate a Company and to authorise the transfer to them of the Southern Section Undertaking of the Midland and South Western Junction Railway Company and for other purposes.
Oldham Corporation Act 1886	49 & 50 Vict. c. cxvii	25 June 1886
An Act to authorise the Corporation of Oldham to construct additional Waterworks to increase the number of the Wards and of the Aldermen and Councillors of the Borough of Oldham to declare the Borough exempt from the jurisdiction of the Court of Record for the Hundred of Salford to confer further powers on the Corporation with respect to Gasworks Cemeteries and other matters and to make further provision for the improvement and good government of the Borough.
Folkestone, Sandgate and Hythe Tramways Act 1886	49 & 50 Vict. c. cxviii	25 June 1886
An Act to authorise the Folkestone Sandgate and Hythe Tramways Company to abandon a portion of the Tramway authorised by the Folkestone Sandgate and Hythe Tramways Act, 1884, (Note: Folkestone, Sandgate and Hythe Tramways Act 1884 (47 & 48 Vict. c. clxvi)) to extend the time limited by that Act for the completion of works to construct new Tramways and for other purposes.
Torquay Harbour and District Act 1886	49 & 50 Vict. c. cxix	25 June 1886
An Act for confirming the Agreement between Lord Haldon and the Local Board of Health for the District of Torquay for the Sale of the Harbour Undertaking to authorise the creation of Local Board Stock and for other purposes.

=== Private and personal acts ===
Short title	Citation	Royal assent
Long title
Lord Walsingham's Estate Act 1886	49 & 50 Vict. c. 1 Pr.	25 June 1886
An Act to enable the Trustees of Thomas Lord Walsingham's Settled Estate, to grant Building Leases of Land in the Parish of Saint George, Hanover Square, in the County of Middlesex, and for other purposes in relation thereto.
Westropp's Divorce Act 1886 (Note: This act was not printed by the Queen's Printer.)	49 & 50 Vict. c. 2 Pr.	25 June 1886
An Act to dissolve the marriage of Louisa Jane Moore Morgan Westropp with Edward Spread Morgan Westropp and to enable her to marry again and for other purposes.
Brooke's Divorce Act 1886	49 & 50 Vict. c. 3 Pr.	25 June 1886
An Act to dissolve the Marriage of Gerald Richard Brooke, of Kellystown House, Clonsilla, in the County of Dublin, Esquire, with the Honorable Kathleen Brooke, his now Wife, and to enable him to marry again, and for other purposes.

=== Sources ===
- The Public General Statutes. Passed in the Forty-Ninth and Fiftieth Years of the Reign of Her Majesty Queen Victoria, 1886. Vol. 22. London: Eyre and Spottiswoode. 1886 – via Google Books.
- The Public General Statutes. Passed in the Forty-Ninth and Fiftieth Years of the Reign of Her Majesty Queen Victoria, 1886. Vol. 22. London: Eyre and Spottiswoode. 1886 – via Internet Archive.
- Local and Personal Acts – via Google Books.

== 50 Vict. ==
The first session of the 24th Parliament of the United Kingdom, which met from 5 August 1886 until 25 September 1886.

No private acts were passed during this session.

=== Public general acts ===
Short title	Citation	Royal assent
Long title
Appropriation Act 1886, Session 2 (repealed)	50 Vict. c. 1	25 September 1886
An Act to apply a sum out of the Consolidated Fund to the service of the year ending on the thirty-first day of March one thousand eight hundred and eighty-seven, and to appropriate the Supplies granted in this Session of Parliament. (Repealed by Statute Law Revision Act 1898 (61 & 62 Vict. c. 22))
Secret Service Money (Repeal) Act 1886 (repealed)	50 Vict. c. 2	25 September 1886
An Act to repeal the enactments authorising the issue out of the Consolidated Fund of money for Secret Service within the United Kingdom. (Repealed by Statute Law Revision Act 1898 (61 & 62 Vict. c. 22))
Submarine Telegraph Act 1886 (repealed)	50 Vict. c. 3	25 September 1886
An Act to amend the Submarine Telegraph Act, 1885. (Note: Submarine Telegraph Act 1885 (48 & 49 Vict. c.49)) (Repealed by Statute Law Revision Act 1898 (61 & 62 Vict. c. 22))
Belfast Commission Act 1886 (repealed)	50 Vict. c. 4	25 September 1886
An Act for facilitating the proceedings of the Commissioners appointed to hold a Court of Inquiry respecting Riots and Disturbances at Belfast. (Repealed by Statute Law Revision Act 1898 (61 & 62 Vict. c. 22))
Expiring Laws Continuance Act 1886 (repealed)	50 Vict. c. 5	25 September 1886
An Act to continue various expiring Laws. (Repealed by Statute Law Revision Act 1898 (61 & 62 Vict. c. 22))

=== Local acts ===
Short title	Citation	Royal assent
Long title
Education Department Provisional Order Confirmation (Birmingham) Act 1886	50 Vict. c. i	25 September 1886
An Act to confirm a Provisional Order made by the Education Department under the Elementary Education Act, 1870, (Note: Elementary Education Act 1870 (33 & 34 Vict. c. 75)) to enable the School Board for Birmingham to put in force the Lands Clauses Consolidation Act, 1845, (Note: Lands Clauses Consolidation Act 1845 (8 & 9 Vict. c. 18)) and the Acts amending the same.
	Provisional Order for putting in force the Lands Clauses Consolidation Act, 1845.	
Education Department Provisional Order Confirmation (London) Act 1886	50 Vict. c. ii	25 September 1886
An Act to confirm a Provisional Order made by the Education Department under the Elementary Education Act, 1870, to enable the School Board for London to put in force the Lands Clauses Consolidation Act, 1845, and the Acts amending the same.
	Provisional Order for putting in force the Lands Clauses Consolidation Act, 1845.	
Local Government Board's Provisional Order Confirmation (Poor Law) (No. 7) Act 1886	50 Vict. c. iii	25 September 1886
An Act to confirm a Provisional Order of the Local Government Board under the provisions of the Divided Parishes and Poor Law Amendment Act, 1876, (Note: Divided Parishes and Poor Law Amendment Act 1876 (39 & 40 Vict. c. 61)) as amended and extended by the Poor Law Act, 1879, (Note: Poor Law Act 1879 (42 & 43 Vict. c. 54)) relating to the Parish of Broadwell, and to the Hamlet of Filkins.
	Broadwell and Filkins (Oxon. and Glos.) Order 1886	
Local Government Board's Provisional Order Confirmation (County Divisions) Act 1886	50 Vict. c. iv	25 September 1886
An Act to confirm a Provisional Order of the Local Government Board under the provisions of the Redistribution of Seats Act, 1885, (Note: Redistribution of Seats Act 1885 (48 & 49 Vict. c. 23)) relating to the Parish of Misson.
	Misson Order 1886 Provisional Order under Section 23 of the Redistribution of Seats Act, 1885.	
Local Government Board's Provisional Orders Confirmation (Gas) Act 1886	50 Vict. c. v	25 September 1886
An Act to confirm certain Provisional Orders of the Local Government Board under the provisions of the Gas and Water Works Facilities Act, 1870, (Note: Gas and Water Works Facilities Act 1870 (33 & 34 Vict. c. 70)) and the Public Health Act, 1875, (Note: Public Health Act 1875 (38 & 39 Vict. c. 55)) relating to the Borough of Droitwich, and the Local Government Districts of Marsden and Penrith.
	Droitwich Gas Order 1886 Provisional Order under the Gas and Water Works Facilities Act, 1870, and the Gas and Water Works Facilities Act, 1870, Amendment Act, 1873. (Note: Gas and Water Works Facilities Act 1870 Amendment Act 1873 (36 & 37 Vict. c. 89))	
	Marsden Gas Order 1886 Provisional Order under the Gas and Water Works Facilities Act, 1870.	
	Penrith Gas Order 1886 Provisional Order under the Gas and Water Works Facilities Act, 1870, and the Gas and Water Works Facilities Act, 1870, Amendment Act, 1873, for amending the Penrith Gas Order, 1877.	
Local Government Board's Provisional Order Confirmation (Highways) Act 1886	50 Vict. c. vi	25 September 1886
An Act to confirm a Provisional Order of the Local Government Board under the Highways and Locomotives (Amendment) Act, 1878, (Note: Highways and Locomotives (Amendment) Act 1878 (41 & 42 Vict. c. 77)) relating to the County of Montgomery.
	Montgomery Order 1886 Provisional Order as to certain Disturnpiked Roads.	
Local Government Board's Provisional Orders Confirmation (No. 3) Act 1886	50 Vict. c. vii	25 September 1886
An Act to confirm certain Provisional Orders of the Local Government Board relating to the Improvement Act District of Cambridge, the Local Government Districts of Cheshunt and Cleckheaton, the Borough of Portsmouth, and the Rural Sanitary Districts of the Stockport and Wangford Unions (two).
	Cambridge Order 1886 Provisional Order to enable the Sanitary Authority for the Urban Sanitary District of Cambridge to put in force the compulsory Clauses of the Lands Clauses Consolidation Acts.	
	Cheshunt Order 1886 Provisional Order to enable the Sanitary Authority for the Urban Sanitary District of Cheshunt to put in force the compulsory Clauses of the Lands Clauses Consolidation Acts.	
	Cleckheaton Order 1886 Provisional Order to enable the Sanitary Authority for the Urban Sanitary District of Cleckheaton to put in force the compulsory Clauses of the Lands Clauses Consolidation Acts.	
	Portsmouth Order 1886 Provisional Order to enable the Sanitary Authority for the Borough of Portsmouth to put in force the compulsory Clauses of the Lands Clauses Consolidation Acts.	
	Stockport Union Order 1886 Provisional Order to enable the Sanitary Authority for the Rural Sanitary District of the Stockport Union to put in force the compulsory Clauses of the Lands Clauses Consolidation Acts.	
	Wangford Union Order (1) 1886 Provisional Order for altering a Confirming Act. (Note: Local Government Board's Provisional Orders Confirmation (No. 4) Act 1885 (48 & 49 Vict. c. ci))	
	Wangford Union Order (2) 1886 Provisional Order to enable the Sanitary Authority for the Rural Sanitary District of the Wangford Union to put in force the compulsory Clauses of the Lands Clauses Consolidation Acts.	
Local Government Board's Provisional Orders Confirmation (No. 6) Act 1886	50 Vict. c. viii	25 September 1886
An Act to confirm certain Provisional Orders of the Local Government Board relating to the Borough of Burslem, the Local Government District of Denton and Haughton, the Borough of Dewsbury (two), the Local Government District of Heckmondwike, the Boroughs of Lancaster and Southport, and the Local Government Districts of Ulverston and Widnes.
	Burslem Order 1886 Provisional Order for altering the Burslem Local Board Gas Act, 1877. (Note: Burslem Local Board Gas Act 1877 (40 & 41 Vict. c. ccviii))	
	Denton and Haughton Order 1886 Provisional Order for altering certain Local Acts (Note: Dukinfield and Denton Local Boards (Gas) Act 1877 (40 & 41 Vict. c. cxc)) (Note: Denton and Haughton (Gas) Act 1880 (43 & 44 Vict. c. xvii)) and a Confirming Act. (Note: Local Government Board's Provisional Orders Confirmation (No. 8) Act 1884 (47 & 48 Vict. c. ccxv))	
	Dewsbury Order 1886 Provisional Order for altering certain Local Acts. (Note: Dewsbury and Batley Corporations (Gas) Act 1873 (36 & 37 Vict. c. clix)) (Note: Dewsbury Improvement Act 1884 (47 & 48 Vict. c. clxxx))	
	Dewsbury and Heckmondwike Order 1886 Provisional Order for altering the Dewsbury and Heckmondwike Waterworks Act, 1876. (Note: Dewsbury and Heckmondwike Waterworks Act 1876 (39 & 40 Vict. c. clxxxv))	
	Lancaster Order 1886 Provisional Order for altering certain Local Acts. (Note: Lancaster Water and Improvement Act 1876 (39 & 40 Vict. c. clxxxvi)) (Note: Lancaster Corporation Act 1880 (43 & 44 Vict. c. lxxvii))	
	Southport Order 1886 Provisional Order for altering and amending certain Local Acts. (Note: Southport Improvement Act 1871 (34 & 35 Vict. c. cxl)) (Note: Southport Improvement Act 1875 (38 & 39 Vict. c. cxxvi)) (Note: Southport Improvement Act 1876 (39 & 40 Vict. c. cxxvii))	
	Ulverston Order 1886 Provisional Order for altering a Local Act. (Note: Ulverston Local Board Act 1874 (37 & 38 Vict. c. cliv))	
	Widnes Order 1886 Provisional Order for altering a Local Act (Note: Widnes Local Board Act 1875 (38 & 39 Vict. c. lxxxviii)) and a Confirming Act. (Note: Local Government Board's Provisional Orders Confirmation (Aspull, &c.) Act 1879 (42 & 43 Vict. c. cv))	
Pier and Harbour Orders Confirmation Act 1886	50 Vict. c. ix	25 September 1886
An Act to confirm certain Provisional Orders made by the Board of Trade under the General Pier and Harbour Act, 1861, (Note: General Pier and Harbour Act 1861 (24 & 25 Vict. c. 45)) relating to Ballyshannon, Buckpool, Coldingham, Cullen, Dovercourt, Dunbar, Loch Ranza, Lynmouth, Mevagissey, Newlyn, Penarth, Saint Ives, Shanklin, and Wexford.
	Ballyshannon Harbour Order 1886 Order for the improvement, maintenance, and regulation of the Harbour of Ballyshannon, in the County of Donegal.	
	Buckpool Harbour Order 1886 Order for the regulation of the Harbour of Buckpool, in the County of Banff, the appointment of Harbour Commissioners, and the construction of Works, and for other purposes.	
	Coldingham-shore Harbour Order 1886 Order for the construction, maintenance and regulation of the Harbour at Coldingham-shore, in the parish of Coldingham, in the county of Berwick.	
	Cullen Harbour Order 1886 Order for amending the Cullen Harbour Order, 1884.	
	Dovercourt Pier Order 1886 Order for the construction, maintenance, and regulation of a Promenade Pier and Landing Place at Dovercourt, in the county of Essex.	
	Dunbar Harbour Order 1886 Order for conferring further powers on the Magistrates and Town Council of Dunbar in relation to the Harbour of Dunbar, in the county of Haddington.	
	Loch Ranza Pier Order 1886 Order for the construction, maintenance, and regulation of a Pier and Works at Loch Ranza, in the parish of Kilmory, Island of Arran, and county of Bute.	
	Lynmouth Pier Order 1886 Order for the Construction, Maintenance, and Regulation of a Pier and Promenade at Lynmouth, in the county of Devon.	
	Mevagissey Harbour Order 1886 Order for amending the Mevagissey Harbour Order, 1865.	
	Newlyn Pier and Harbour Order 1886 Order for amending the Newlyn Pier and Harbour Order, 1884, and for the Construction and Maintenance of an additional Pier at Newlyn, in the Parish of Paul, in the County of Cornwall.	
	Penarth Promenade and Landing Pier Order 1886 Order for the revival of the Penarth Promenade and Landing Pier Order, 1881.	
	St. Ives Harbour Order 1886 Order for vesting the Harbour of St. Ives, in the county of Cornwall, in the Mayor, Aldermen, and Burgesses of the Borough of St. Ives, for enabling the said Corporation to construct Works for the Improvement of the Harbour, and for other purposes.	
	Shanklin Pier Order 1886 Order for the construction, maintenance, and regulation of a Pier at Shanklin, in the Isle of Wight.	
	Wexford Harbour Order 1886 Order for amending the Wexford Harbour Act, 1874.	
Tramways Orders Confirmation (No. 1) Act 1886	50 Vict. c. x	25 September 1886
An Act to confirm certain Provisional Orders made by the Board of Trade under the Tramways Act, 1870, (Note: Tramways Act 1870 (33 & 34 Vict. c. 78)) relating to Dudley, Stourbridge, and Kingswinford Tramways, Great Grimsby Street Tramways (Cleethorpes Extension), Halifax and Districts Tramways, Jarrow and Hebburn and District Tramways, and North Staffordshire Tramways.
	Dudley, Stourbridge and Kingswinford Tramways Order 1881 Amendment Order 1886 Order amending the Dudley, Stourbridge, and Kingswinford Tramways Order, 1881.	
	Great Grimsby Street Tramways (Cleethorpes Extension) Order 1886 Order authorising the Great Grimsby Street Tramways Company to construct additional tramways in the hamlet of Cleethorpes in the parish of Old Clee and county of Lincoln.	
	Halifax and Districts Tramways (Release of Deposit) Order 1886 Order authorising the abandonment of the tramways authorised by the Halifax and Districts Tramways Order, 1883, and the release of the deposit fund paid into court on the application of the said Order.	
	Jarrow and Hebburn and District Tramways (Release of Deposit) Order 1886 Order authorising the abandonment of the tramways authorised by the Jarrow and Hebburn and District Tramways Order, 1881, and the release of the deposit fund paid into court on the application for the said Order.	
	North Staffordshire Tramways (Release of Deposit) Order 1886 Order authorising the abandonment of certain of the tramways authorised by the North Staffordshire Tramways Order, 1880, and the North Staffordshire Tramways (Extensions) Order, 1881, and the release of portions of the deposit funds paid into court on the application for the said Orders respectively.	
Local Government Board's Provisional Orders Confirmation (No. 8) Act 1886	50 Vict. c. xi	25 September 1886
An Act to confirm certain Provisional Orders of the Local Government Board relating to the Boroughs of Bangor and Bradford (Yorkshire), and the Local Government District of Tyldesley-with-Shakerley.
	Bangor Order 1886 Provisional Order for altering the Bangor Local Board Act, 1878. (Note: Bangor Local Board Act 1878 (41 & 42 Vict. c. cxix))	
	Bradford (Yorks) Order (1) 1886 Provisional Order for altering certain Local Acts.	
	Tyldesley-with-Shakerley Order 1886 Provisional Order for altering a Local Act (Note: Tyldesley-with-Shakerley Local Board (Gas) Act 1865 (28 & 29 Vict. c. xxxv)) and a Confirming Act. (Note: Local Government Board's Provisional Orders Confirmation (Bournemouth, &c.) Act 1878 (41 & 42 Vict. c. clxii))	
Local Government Board's Provisional Order Confirmation (No. 9) Act 1886	50 Vict. c. xii	25 September 1886
An Act to confirm a Provisional Order of the Local Government Board relating to the Local Government District of Panteg.
	Panteg Order 1886 Provisional Order for extending the Local Government District of Panteg.	
Local Government Board (Ireland) Provisional Orders Confirmation (Galway and Londonderry) Act 1886	50 Vict. c. xiii	25 September 1886
An Act to confirm certain Provisional Orders of the Local Government Board for Ireland relating to Galway and Londonderry.
	Galway Town Provisional Order 1886 Town of Galway. Provisional Order.	
	Londonderry Waterworks (Waterside District) Provisional Order 1886 Londonderry Waterworks (Waterside District). Provisional Order.	
Local Government Board's Provisional Orders Confirmation (No. 5) Act 1886	50 Vict. c. xiv	25 September 1886
An Act to confirm certain Provisional Orders of the Local Government Board relating to the Rural Sanitary District of the Barnet Union, the Boroughs of Kingston-upon-Hull and Newport (Mon.), and the City of York.
	Barnet Union Order 1886 Provisional Order to enable the Sanitary Authority for the Rural Sanitary District of the Barnet Union to put in force the Compulsory Clauses of the Lands Clauses Consolidation Acts.	
	Kingston-upon-Hull Order 1886 Provisional Order to enable the Urban Sanitary Authority for the Borough of Kingston-upon-Hull to put in force the Compulsory Clauses of the Lands Clauses Consolidation Acts.	
	Newport (Mon.) Order 1886 Provisional Order to enable the Urban Sanitary Authority for the Borough of Newport (Monmouthshire) to put in force the Compulsory Clauses of the Lands Clauses Consolidation Acts.	
	York Order 1886 Provisional Order to enable the Urban Sanitary Authority for the City of York to put in force the Compulsory Clauses of the Lands Clauses Consolidation Acts.	
Local Government Board's Provisional Orders Confirmation (No. 7) Act 1886	50 Vict. c. xv	25 September 1886
An Act to confirm certain Provisional Orders of the Local Government Board relating to the Borough of Bradford (Yorks), the City of Chichester, the Local Government Districts of Cleator Moor and Hornsey, the Districts of Maryport, Southborough, and Tunbridge Wells, and the West Kent Main Sewerage District.
	Bradford (Yorks) Order (2) 1886 Provisional Order to enable the Urban Sanitary Authority for the Borough of Bradford (Yorks) to put in force the Compulsory Clauses of the Lands Clauses Consolidation Acts.	
	Chichester Order 1886 Provisional Order to enable the Urban Sanitary Authority for the City of Chichester to put in force the Compulsory Clauses of the Lands Clauses Consolidation Acts.	
	Cleator Moor Order 1886 Provisional Order for altering the Cleator Moor Local Board Act, 1881. (Note: Cleator Moor Local Board Act 1881 (44 & 45 Vict. c. lxxviii))	
	Hornsey Order 1886 Provisional Order to enable the Sanitary Authority for the Urban Sanitary District of Hornsey to put in force the Compulsory Clauses of the Lands Clauses Consolidation Acts.	
	Maryport Order 1886 Provisional Order for partially repealing, altering, and amending certain Local Acts.	
	Tunbridge Wells and Southborough Order 1886 Provisional Order for altering the provisions of a Local Act (Note: Tunbridge Wells Improvement Act 1846 (9 & 10 Vict. c. cccxlix)) and certain Confirming Acts.	
	West Kent Main Sewerage Order 1886 Provisional Order for altering certain Local Acts. (Note: West Kent Main Sewerage Act 1875 (38 & 39 Vict. c. clxiii)) (Note: West Kent Main Sewerage (Amendment) Act 1879 (42 & 43 Vict. c. lxviii))	
Local Government Board's Provisional Orders Confirmation (No. 10) Act 1886	50 Vict. c. xvi	25 September 1886
An Act to confirm certain Provisional Orders of the Local Government Board relating to the Boroughs of Gateshead and Kingston-upon-Hull, the Local Government District of North Bierley, and the Boroughs of Stockport and Wigan.
	Gateshead Order 1886 Provisional Order for altering certain Local Acts. (Note: Gateshead Improvement Act 1867 (30 & 31 Vict. c. lxxxiii)) (Note: Gateshead Improvement Act 1877 (40 & 41 Vict. c. cxlii))	
	Kingston-upon-Hull Order 1886 Provisional Order for altering a Local Act. (Note: Hull Extension and Improvement Act 1882 (45 & 46 Vict. c. cxv))	
	North Brierley Order 1886 Provisional Order for altering a Confirming Act. (Note: Local Government Board's Provisional Orders Confirmation (Bingley, &c.) Act 1876 (39 & 40 Vict. c. cxcviii))	
	Stockport Order 1886 Provisional Order for altering certain Local Acts. (Note: Stockport Improvement Act 1837 (7 Will. 4 & 1 Vict. c. cxxix)) (Note: Stockport Improvement Act 1847 (10 & 11 Vict. c. cclxxxiv))	
	Wigan Order 1886 Provisional Order for altering certain Local Acts and Confirming Acts.	
Local Government Board's Provisional Orders Confirmation (No. 11) Act 1886	50 Vict. c. xvii	25 September 1886
An Act to confirm certain Provisional Orders of the Local Government Board relating to the Local Government District of Dukinfield, the City of Manchester, and the Rochester and Chatham Joint Hospital District.
	Dukinfield Order 1886 Provisional Order for altering certain Local Acts (Note: Dukinfield and Denton Local Boards (Gas) Act 1877 (40 & 41 Vict. c. cxc)) (Note: Denton and Haughton Gas Act 1880 (43 & 44 Vict. c. xvii)) and a Confirming Act. (Note: Local Government Supplemental Act 1866 (29 & 30 Vict. c. 24))	
	Manchester Order 1886 Provisional Order for partially repealing and altering certain Local Acts.	
	Rochester and Chatham Joint Hospital District Order 1886 Provisional Order for altering a Confirming Act. (Note: Local Government Board's Provisional Orders Confirmation (Bethesda, &c.) Act 1880 (43 & 44 Vict. c. clxxviii))	
Electric Lighting Order Confirmation Act 1886	50 Vict. c. xviii	25 September 1886
An Act to confirm a Provisional Order made by the Board of Trade under the Electric Lighting Act, 1882, (Note: Electric Lighting Act 1882 (45 & 46 Vict. c. 56)) relating to Chelsea.
	Chelsea Electric Lighting Order 1886 Order authorising the Chelsea Electricity Supply Company, Limited, to erect and maintain Electric Lines and Works, and to supply Electricity within the Parish of Chelsea, in the County of Middlesex.	
Gas Orders Confirmation (No. 2) Act 1886	50 Vict. c. xix	25 September 1886
An Act to confirm certain Provisional Orders made by the Board of Trade under the Gas and Water Works Facilities Act, 1870, relating to Abingdon Gas, Hoddesdon Gas, Honley Gas, Horley District Gas, and Langley Mill and Heanor Gas.
	Abingdon Gas Order 1886 Order empowering the Abingdon Gaslight and Coke Company, Limited, to construct and maintain additional gasworks, and to extend their limits of supply and to increase their capital.	
	Hoddesdon Gas Order 1886 Order empowering the Hoddesdon Gas and Coke Company, Limited, to maintain and continue their existing gasworks at Hoddesdon in the county of Hertford, to construct additional works, to make and supply gas, and to raise further capital.	
	Honley Gas Order 1886 Order empowering the Honley Gas Company, Limited, to maintain and continue gasworks, and to make and supply gas in certain parts of the townships of Honley and Thurstonland, all in the west riding of the county of York.	
	Horley District Gas Order 1886 Order empowering the Horley District Gas Company, Limited, to construct and maintain gasworks, and to make and supply gas within parts of the parishes of Horley and Nutfield, and the parishes of Charlwood, Newdigate, Burstow, and Horne, all in the county of Surrey, and part of the parish of Upper Beeding, and the parishes of Ifield, Rusper, Crawley, and Worth, all in the county of Sussex, and for other purposes.	
	Langley Mill and Heanor Gas Order 1886 Order empowering the Langley Mill and Heanor Gaslight and Coke Company, Limited, to maintain and continue gasworks, and to construct additional gasworks, and to make and supply gas in the township of Heanor and the district of Loscoe, in the township of Codnor and Loscoe, and so much of the township of Smalley, and of that part of the township of Codnor Park, called Aldercar, as lie within a radius of a mile and three-quarters from the parish church of Heanor, all in the county of Derby.	
Urray Water Supply Confirmation Act 1886	50 Vict. c. xx	25 September 1886
An Act to confirm a Provisional Order under the Public Health (Scotland) Act, 1867, (Note: Public Health (Scotland) Act 1867 (30 & 31 Vict. c. 101)) relating to Urray Water.
	Public Health (Scotland) Act, 1867 (30 & 31 Vict. c. 101.) Provisional Order.	
Tramways Orders Confirmation (No. 2) Act 1886	50 Vict. c. xxi	25 September 1886
An Act to confirm certain Provisional Orders made by the Board of Trade under the Tramways Act, 1870, relating to Bradford Corporation Tramways, Drypool and Marfleet Steam Tramways, City of Oxford and District Tramways, and Stratford, Ilford, and Romford Tramways.
	Bradford Corporation Tramways Order 1886 Order authorising the Mayor, Aldermen, and Burgesses of the Borough of Bradford to construct additional Tramways in the said Borough.	
	Drypool and Marfleet Steam Tramways Order 1886 Order authorising the construction of Tramways in the Parishes of Drypool and Marfleet, the Township of Southcoates, and the Parish or extra-parochial place of Garrison-side, in the Borough and Town and County of the Town of Kingston-upon-Hull.	
	Oxford Tramways (Extensions) Order 1886 Order authorising the Construction of additional Tramways in the County and City of Oxford and in the County of Berks.	
	Stratford Ilford and Romford Tramways Order 1886 Order authorising the Stratford, Ilford, and Romford Tramways Company, Limited, to construct Tramways in the Parishes of Little Ilford, Barking, Dagenham, and Romford, in the County of Essex.	
Tramways Orders Confirmation (No. 3) Act 1886	50 Vict. c. xxii	25 September 1886
An Act to confirm certain Provisional Orders made by the Board of Trade under the Tramways Act, 1870, relating to Birmingham and Western District Tramways, Birmingham Central Tramways (Extension), South Birmingham Tramways (Extension), and South Staffordshire and Birmingham District Steam Tramways.
	Birmingham and Western Districts Tramways Order 1886 Order conferring further Powers on the Birmingham and Western District Tramways Company (Limited).	
	Birmingham Central Tramways (Extension) Order 1886 Order authorising the Construction of Tramways in the Borough of Birmingham and in the parishes or places of Edgbaston, Aston, and Saltley in the County of Warwick, Handsworth in the County of Stafford, and King's Norton, Northfield, and Balsall Heath, in the County of Worcester, and for other purposes.	
	South Birmingham Tramways (Extension) Order 1886 Order authorising the Construction of Tramways in the Parishes of Edgbaston and Aston, in the County of Warwick, and Yardley and King's Norton, in the County of Worcester; and amending the South Birmingham Tramways Order, 1883, and the South Birmingham Tramways Order, 1884.	
	South Staffordshire and Birmingham District Steam Tramways Order 1886 Order authorising the abandonment of certain of the Tramways authorised by the Staffordshire Tramways Order, 1879, the Staffordshire Tramways (Extension) Order, 1882, and the Dudley and Tipton Tramways Order, 1881, and the Release of portions of the Deposit Funds paid into Court on the applications for the said Orders respectively; and for other purposes.	
Exeter, Teign Valley and Chagford Railway (Extension of Time) Act 1886	50 Vict. c. xxiii	25 September 1886
An Act to extend the time for purchasing Lands and completing the Railways and works authorised by the Exeter Teign Valley and Chagford Railway Act, 1883. (Note: Exeter, Teign Valley and Chagford Railway Act 1883 (46 & 47 Vict. c. ccv))
Plymouth, Devonport and District Tramways Act 1886	50 Vict. c. xxiv	25 September 1886
An Act for authorising the release of the Balance of the Deposit Fund remaining deposited as security for the completion of certain of the Tramways authorised by the Plymouth Devonport and District Tramways Act 1882. (Note: Plymouth, Devonport and District Tramways Act 1882 (45 & 46 Vict. c. clix))
Salford Corporation Act 1886	50 Vict. c. xxv	25 September 1886
An Act to enable the Mayor Aldermen and Burgesses of the Borough of Salford to purchase waste lands in the Borough and for other purposes.
Moore Street Market and North Dublin City Improvement Act 1886	50 Vict. c. xxvi	25 September 1886
An Act to extend the time for the purchase of Lands and completion of certain Works authorised by the Moore Street Market and North Dublin City Improvement Act 1882 and for other purposes.
Warehousemen's and Clerks' Schools Act 1886 (repealed)	50 Vict. c. xxvii	25 September 1886
An Act to enable certain fundamental Rules of the Institution called "The Warehousemen and Clerks' Schools for orphan and necessitous Children" to be repealed altered or amended at a special Court of the Institution and for other purposes. (Repealed by Royal Warehousemen Clerks and Drapers' Schools Act 1954 (2 & 3 Eliz. 2. c. xxxix))
River Suck (County Connaught) Drainage Act 1886	50 Vict. c. xxviii	25 September 1886
An Act for further extending the time for the completion of the Works authorised by the Drainage and Improvement of Lands Supplemental Act (Ireland) 1878 (Note: Drainage and Improvement of Lands Supplemental Act (Ireland) 1878 (41 & 42 Vict. c. xxxviii)) as extended by the Commissioners of Public Works in Ireland.
Ionian Bank (Limited) Act 1886	50 Vict. c. xxix	25 September 1886
An Act to amend the Ionian Bank Act 1882 (Note: Ionian Bank Act 1882 (45 & 46 Vict. c. ccxli)) and for other purposes.
Woodstock Railway Act 1886	50 Vict. c. xxx	25 September 1886
An Act for incorporating the Woodstock Railway Company and for other purposes.
Leeds Compressed Air Power Company's Act 1886	50 Vict. c. xxxi	25 September 1886
An Act to incorporate and confer powers on the Leeds Compressed Air Power Company and for other purposes.
Lynton Railway Act 1886 (repealed)	50 Vict. c. xxxii	25 September 1886
An Act for conferring further powers on the Lynton Railway Company for the construction of works and for other purposes. (Repealed by Statute Law (Repeals) Act 2013 (c. 2))
St. Helens and Wigan Junction Railway Act 1886	50 Vict. c. xxxiii	25 September 1886
An Act to empower the St. Helens and Wigan Junction Railway Company to make new Railways and for other purposes.
Ardrossan Harbour (Sale and Transfer) Act 1886	50 Vict. c. xxxiv	25 September 1886
An Act to incorporate a Company and to authorise the sale and transfer to them of the Harbour of Ardrossan and for other purposes.
Muswell Hill and Palace Railway Act 1886	50 Vict. c. xxxv	25 September 1886
An Act for incorporating into a separate Company the holders of shares and stock in the railway undertaking of the Muswell Hill Estate Company Limited and for other purposes.
Chatham and Brompton Tramways Act 1886 (repealed)	50 Vict. c. xxxvi	25 September 1886
An Act to extend the time for constructing the Chatham and Brompton Tramways. (Repealed by Chatham and Brompton Tramways (Abandonment) Act 1888 (51 & 52 Vict. c. xxxv))
Barry and Cadoxton Gas and Water Act 1886 (repealed)	50 Vict. c. xxxvii	25 September 1886
An Act for incorporating the Barry and Cadoxton Gas and Water Company and conferring powers on them for the construction of works the supply of Gas and Water and for other purposes. (Repealed by County of South Glamorgan Act 1976 (c. xxxv))
Nelson Improvement Act 1886	50 Vict. c. xxxviii	25 September 1886
An Act to extend the District and the limits of Water Supply of the Local Board for the District of Nelson in the County of Lancaster and to confer upon them further powers with respect to the acquisition and management of a Recreation Ground and the improvement and government of their District and the raising of money; and for other purposes.
North London Tramways Act 1886	50 Vict. c. xxxix	25 September 1886
An Act to empower the North London Tramways Company to raise new Capital; and for other purposes.
Rotherham and Bawtry Railway Act 1886 (repealed)	50 Vict. c. xl	25 September 1886
An Act to extend the powers of the Rotherham and Bawtry Railway Company for the acquisition of Lands for and the completion of their authorised Railways; and for other purposes. (Repealed by Rotherham and Bawtry Railway (Abandonment) Act 1888 (51 & 52 Vict. c. cc))
Hampstead Heath Enlargement Act 1886	50 Vict. c. xli	25 September 1886
An Act to provide for the acquisition of Parliament Hill and other Lands and their addition to Hampstead Heath.
Metropolitan Railway Act 1886	50 Vict. c. xlii	25 September 1886
An Act to extend the Powers of Section 37 of the Metropolitan Railway Act 1885 (Note: Metropolitan Railway Act 1885 (48 & 49 Vict. c. lxxxix)) for the Purchase and Extinction of the Divided Ordinary Stock of the Metropolitan Railway Company; and for other purposes.
Seacombe, Hoylake and Dee Side Railway Act 1886	50 Vict. c. xliii	25 September 1886
An Act to authorise the Seacombe Hoylake and Deeside Railway Company to construct Extension Railways; and for other purposes.
Halifax High Level and North and South Junction Railway Act 1886	50 Vict. c. xliv	25 September 1886
An Act for conferring further powers on the Halifax High Level and North and South Junction Railway Company in relation to their undertaking and for other purposes.
Mersey Railway Act 1886	50 Vict. c. xlv	25 September 1886
An Act to authorise the Mersey Railway Company to extend their Railway in Birkenhead and for other purposes.
Midland and South Western Junction Railway Act 1886	50 Vict. c. xlvi	25 September 1886
An Act to confer further powers on the Midland and South-western Junction Railway Company and for other purposes.
Portsmouth and Hayling Railway Act 1886	50 Vict. c. xlvii	25 September 1886
An Act to authorise the construction of a Railway between Portsmouth and Hayling Island with a Bridge available for road traffic over the southern entrance to Langstone Harbour and other works and for other purposes.
Sutton and Willoughby Railway (Mablethorpe Extension) Act 1886	50 Vict. c. xlviii	25 September 1886
An Act to enable the Sutton and Willoughby Railway Company to extend their Railway to Mablethorpe in the Parts of Lindsey in the County of Lincoln and to confer upon them further powers in relation to their Undertaking; and for other purposes.
Manchester, Sheffield and Lincolnshire Railway (Additional Powers) Act 1886	50 Vict. c. xlix	25 September 1886
An Act to enable the Sutton and Willoughby Railway Company to extend their Railway to Mablethorpe in the Parts of Lindsey in the County of Lincoln and to confer upon them further powers in relation to their Undertaking; and for other purposes.
Bank of South Australia (Limited) Act 1886	50 Vict. c. l	25 September 1886
An Act to explain and amend the Bank of South Australia Act, 1884; (Note: Bank of South Australia Act 1884 (47 & 48 Vict. c. clxxviii)) and for other purposes.
Midland and Central Wales Junction Railway (Abandonment) Act 1886 (repealed)	50 Vict. c. li	25 September 1886
An Act for the Abandonment of the Midland and Central Wales Junction Railway. (Repealed by Statute Law (Repeals) Act 2013 (c. 2))
Plymouth and Devonport (Extension) Tramways Act 1886	50 Vict. c. lii	25 September 1886
An Act to incorporate the Plymouth and Devonport (Extension) Tramways Company and to authorise that Company to acquire and complete certain Tramways constructed under the Plymouth Devonport and District Tramways Act 1882 and to construct certain other Tramways in the county of Devon and for other purposes.
North Pembrokeshire and Fishguard Railway Act 1886	50 Vict. c. liii	25 September 1886
An Act to revive the powers for the construction of a portion of the Railway authorised by the Rosebush and Fishguard Railway Act 1878 (Note: Rosebush and Fishguard Railway Act 1878 (41 & 42 Vict. c. ccxviii)) to authorise the North Pembrokeshire and Fishguard Railway Company to construct a deviation Railway and for other purposes.
Bridgwater Railway Act 1886	50 Vict. c. liv	25 September 1886
An Act for conferring further powers on the Bridgewater Railway Company in relation to their Undertaking and for other purposes.
Neath Harbour Act 1886	50 Vict. c. lv	25 September 1886
An Act to confer further powers upon the Neath Harbour Commissioners, to alter the Constitution of the Commissioners, and for other purposes.

=== Sources ===
- The Public General Statutes, Volume 23: 50 Victoria - 1886. 1886 – via Internet Archive.

== See also ==
- List of acts of the Parliament of the United Kingdom
