= Association for Promoting the Extension of the Contagious Diseases Acts =

The Association for Promoting the Extension of the Contagious Diseases Acts (originally, the Association for Promoting the Extension of the Contagious Diseases Act, 1866, to the Civil Population of the United Kingdom) was established in 1867 to support the Contagious Diseases Prevention Act 1864 that was passed by the British Parliament in 1864. The act legalized prostitution and put the women involved under police and medical control. The association strongly campaigned for the extension of the Contagious Diseases Acts to be extended outside of the naval and army barracks and be made effective to the whole of the country, as they believed this was the best way of regulating prostitution.

The supporters of the acts were opposed by the Ladies National Association for the Repeal of the Contagious Diseases Acts, which was led by Elizabeth Wolstenholme and Josephine Butler.

== Contagious Diseases Acts ==
The Contagious Diseases Prevention Act 1864 was a law passed by Parliament in 1864. It was amended by acts of 1866 and 1869 giving even more powers to the police, and covering additional districts. It caused demand not only for extension of the acts to the rest of the country, but also for the repeal of the acts.
