= Elizabeth Caradus =

New Zealand suffragist, temperance and welfare worker

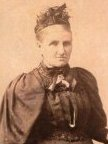
- Born: 26 April 1832; Falkirk, Stirlingshire, Scotland
- Died: 5 November 1912 (aged 80); Auckland, New Zealand
- Spouse: James Caradus (m. 1848)
- Relatives: Edward Caradus (grandson)

Elizabeth Caradus (née Russell; 26 April 1832 – 5 November 1912) was a New Zealand suffragist, temperance and welfare worker.

== Early life ==
She was born in Falkirk, Stirlingshire, Scotland on 26 April 1832 to Elizabeth Adam and David Russell, a carpenter. The family emigrated to Auckland, New Zealand in 1842 on the Jane Gifford. She married James Caradus (born 1823 in Ayrshire, Scotland) James arrived at the same time on the Duchess of Argyle.

James and Elizabeth were married on 10 October 1848 (the sixth anniversary of their arrival in Auckland), when he was 25 and she only 16 and they established a home in Robinson St in the Village of Parnell. James worked as a rope-maker in Mechanics Bay. They had 15 children, of whom seven died in infancy, as was not uncommon in those days.

James became an expert rope-maker and in 1850 started his own ropewalk in Hobson Street, making a wide variety of twines and ropes from dressed New Zealand flax. He exhibited several specimens of his work at the Great Exhibition in London in 1851.

Eventually, it became so difficult to obtain supplies of dressed flax from the Māori that he gave up the ropemaking trade. James then went to the goldfields in Otago, Ballarat in Australia, and Thames, without luck. While he was away, Elizabeth ran a small shop he had built on the front of their house in Napier St, Freemans Bay. The shop was owned by the family until 1910.

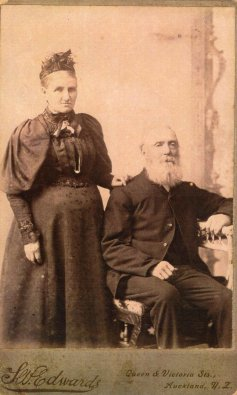
Elizabeth Caradus and her husband James c. 1900

The family later found security by renting out cottages built by James around the Freemans Bay area of Auckland. During this period Freemans Bay was an industrial slum with coal and lime traders, glass and asphalt works and the town morgue. James and Elizabeth spearheaded the Freeman’s Bay Mission, a Methodist outreach centre, and from 1860 held cottage prayer meetings and outdoor services.

== Activism ==
Elizabeth become involved in the Ladies' Christian Association, which became the third constituent member of the YWCA, and held mother's meetings where members sewed together, talked, and prayed. She attended the first meetings of the Women's Christian Temperance Union and the Women's Franchise League and the National Council of Women of New Zealand where she was a leading figure. Unusually for suffrage leaders, she came from a working-class background; she did not write many letters but she spoke frequently and commonly moved motions. As well as campaigning for temperance and suffrage, she also campaigned against the Contagious Diseases Act 1869, which gave police considerable powers against women suspected of being 'common prostitutes' to combat venereal disease, but took no action against men. The New Zealand Contagious Diseases Acts were a reflection of those in the UK which had initially been restricted to naval and army barracks, but soon spread country-wide.

Caradus' signature appears on sheet 406 of the 1893 Women's Suffrage Petition, collected in Auckland.

== Death ==
She died in Auckland on 5 November 1912, survived by seven children.
