= Contagious Diseases Acts Repeal Act 1886 =

Act of the Parliament of the United Kingdom

Contagious Diseases Acts Repeal Act 1886 (Note: Section 1.)
- Act of Parliament
- Parliament of the United Kingdom
- Long title: An Act to repeal the Contagious Diseases Acts, 1866 to 1869.
- Citation: 49 & 50 Vict. c. 10
- Territorial extent: United Kingdom

Dates
- Royal assent: 16 April 1886
- Commencement: 16 April 1886 (Note: The Acts of Parliament (Commencement) Act 1793.)
- Repealed: 25 July 1898
Other legislation
Repeals/revokes	See § Repealed enactments
Repealed by	Statute Law Revision Act 1898

Status: Repealed

Text of statute as originally enacted

The Contagious Diseases Acts Repeal Act 1886 (49 & 50 Vict. c. 10) was an act of the Parliament of the United Kingdom that repealed the Contagious Diseases Acts in the United Kingdom.

== Provisions ==
=== Repealed enactments ===
Section 2 of the act repealed 3 enactments, listed in that section. The repeal did not affect anything duly done or suffered under any repealed enactment, or any penalty, forfeiture or other punishment incurred in respect of any offence against any repealed enactment.

Citation	Short title	Description	Extent of repeal
29 & 30 Vict. c. 35	Contagious Diseases Act 1866	An Act for the better Prevention of Contagious Diseases at certain Naval and Military Stations.	The whole act.
31 & 32 Vict. c. 80	Contagious Diseases (Ireland) Amendment Act 1868	An Act to amend The Contagious Diseases Act, 1866.	The whole act.
32 & 33 Vict. c. 96	Contagious Diseases Act 1869	An Act to amend the Contagious Diseases Act, 1866.	The whole act.

== Subsequent developments ==
The whole act was repealed by section 1 of, and the first part of the schedule to, the Statute Law Revision Act 1898 (61 & 62 Vict. c. 22), which came into force on 25 July 1898.
