= Edward Caradus =

New Zealand chemist

Edward Caradus OBE
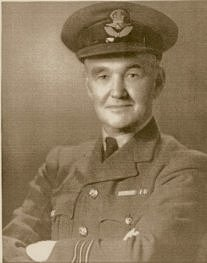
- Born: 6 December 1885; Auckland, New Zealand
- Died: 15 February 1969 (aged 83); Wellington, New Zealand
- Education: Auckland University College
- Occupations: Analytical chemist Educator
- Relatives: Elizabeth Caradus (grandmother)

Edward Caradus OBE (6 December 1885 – 15 February 1969) was a New Zealand analytical chemist, educator and administrator. He developed a model for training aircrew during World War II. In 1949 he became the first chair of the National Trades Certification Board.

== Early life ==
Caradus was born in Auckland, New Zealand in 1885. His paternal grandparents, James and Elizabeth Caradus, had emigrated to New Zealand in 1842 on the ships Jane Gifford and Duchess of Argyle.

Between 1897 and 1902 Caradus was educated at Auckland Grammar School, where he won a scholarship to attend Auckland University College.

In 1904, while at university, Caradus was awarded the Sir George Grey Science Scholarship in chemistry. He graduated from Auckland University College with a Bachelor of Science in 1906.

Caradus joined the Waihi Grand Junction Gold Mining Company in Waihi as an analytical chemist in 1906, but in 1908 decided to pursue a career in education. George Douglas Robb was one of his early pupils and commented in his autobiography that chemistry, presented by Caradus in a didactic way, fired his imagination.

Caradus taught at Wellington College from 1909 to 1913 before becoming senior science master at Auckland Grammar School (1913–22) and first assistant at Nelson College (1922–26). He was appointed an inspector of secondary schools in 1926. In 1937 he was promoted to senior inspector and in 1941 he became the chief inspector of secondary schools.

Caradus was a member of the University Entrance Board and assisted the University of New Zealand to review the results of University Entrance and University Entrance Scholarship examinations. He later made study of examination procedure and technique in relation to the New Zealand University Entrance examinations, which was published in about 1960.

== World War II ==
In 1938 Caradus was the educational advisor to the Air Department. In 1942, during World War II the Royal New Zealand Air Force (RNZAF) appointed Caradus as its director of educational services with the rank of wing commander, while he also continued to work as senior inspector of secondary schools. Caradus was charged with the responsibility of ensuring a steady flow of appropriately educated young men, who would go on to train as aircrew with the RNZAF and the RAF. In 1941 he was appointed chief inspector of secondary schools, but in 1943 the government decided his position of director of educational services was required on a full-time basis, and he was placed on leave from his chief inspector's role for the duration of the war.

Many potential pilots and navigators did not have the required education, but a lowering of standards would have been dangerous. Caradus devised and prepared a pre-entry course of educational training which covered elementary navigation, mathematics, elementary science and some service subjects. After a few weeks, however, it was found that men who were nominally up to standard were at a disadvantage on entering their service training in comparison with those who had done the pre-entry course. It was therefore decided that all except those with very high qualifications should take the course. The scheme was a great success and saw a vast increase in the number of graduates.

The importance of the aircrew pre-entry education scheme to New Zealand's war effort was acknowledged by the Prime Minister, Peter Fraser. The scheme was adopted by the Royal Australian Air Force and served as a model for similar schemes in Britain and other countries of the then British Empire. Throughout his time in this position Caradus was also a member of the RNZAF Aircrew Selection Committee.

By mid-1944 the focus of Caradus' role had changed from initial training to rehabilitation of returning airmen and sailors to the normal workforce. Royal New Zealand Navy personnel had also been brought under Caradus' purview.

In the 1946 New Year Honours, Caradus was appointed an Officer of the Military Division of the Order of the British Empire.

== Later life ==
After the war Caradus resumed his position as chief inspector, secondary schools. At the same time, Caradus continued to act as director of educational services for the RNZAF, when required. He held both positions until his retirement in 1948. He also continued to represent the air force and naval interests on the education committee of the Rehabilitation Board.

In November 1946 Rex Mason, Minister of Education, set up a consultative committee to examine the Education Department's technological examinations. There had been problems with these for some time and a fresh approach had become necessary. Caradus was appointed committee chair. The committee consisted of six educationalists and six industry representatives. The committee recommended setting up a National Trades Certification Board. The Government adopted the committee's recommendation and Caradus was appointed first chairman of the board in 1949.

In 1947, while attending a science conference in Perth, Australia, Caradus was invited by A.J. Gibson to address a royal commission into management, control and working of an Australian mechanical workshop. In 1953, he was awarded the Queen Elizabeth II Coronation Medal.

During his retirement, Caradus taught chemistry for two years part-time at Wellington East Girls' College, and was on the boards of several organisations, such as the Rehabilitation Board, the Wellington Hospital Board and the Horowhenua Power Board. In 1957, Caradus came out of retirement and accepted the position of Headmaster at Scots College, Wellington, New Zealand, for a period of two years. The Caradus Shield for the winners of the annual best house competition was named in his honour.

Caradus died on 15 February 1969, and his ashes were buried in Karori Cemetery, Wellington.

== See also ==
- British Commonwealth Air Training Plan
- First Labour Government of New Zealand § Education
