= Consolidated Fund Act =

United Kingdom legislation

A Consolidated Fund Act is an act of the Parliament of the United Kingdom passed to allow, like an Appropriation Act, the Treasury to issue funds out of the Consolidated Fund.

== Structure ==
The typical structure of such an act begins with the long title, which defines which financial years the act applies to. This is followed by a preamble and then the enacting clause:

Whereas the Commons of the United Kingdom in Parliament assembled have resolved to authorise the use of resources and the issue of sums out of the Consolidated Fund towards making good the supply which they have granted to His Majesty in this Session of Parliament:—

Be it therefore enacted by the King's most Excellent Majesty, by and with the advice and consent of the Lords Spiritual and Temporal, and Commons, in this present Parliament assembled, and by the authority of the same, as follows:—

Until 2000 and the passing of the Consolidated Fund Act 2001, an older form of preamble was used:

Most Gracious Sovereign,

WE, Your Majesty's most dutiful and loyal subjects, the Commons of the United Kingdom in Parliament assembled, towards making good the supply which we have cheerfully granted to Your Majesty in this Session of Parliament, have resolved to grant unto Your Majesty the sums hereinafter mentioned; and do therefore most humbly beseech Your Majesty that it may be enacted and be it enacted by the Queen's most Excellent Majesty, by and with the advice and consent of the Lords Spiritual and Temporal, and Commons, in this present Parliament assembled, and by the authority of the same, as follows:—

If, as most of the acts do, the legislation covers two fiscal years the legislation's first two sections will contain the amounts to be paid out of the Consolidated Fund for each particular financial year. The third section of the act defines its short title. Typically two or three consolidated fund acts are passed each calendar year.

== Repeals ==
Consolidated Fund Act 1816 (Note: The citation of this act by this short title was authorised by section 1 of, and the first schedule to, the Short Titles Act 1896. Due to the repeal of those provisions it is now authorised by section 19(2) of the Interpretation Act 1978.)
- Act of Parliament
- Parliament of the United Kingdom
- Long title: An Act to unite and consolidate into One Fund all the Public Revenues of Great Britain and Ireland, and to provide for the Application thereof to the General Service of the United Kingdom.
- Citation: 56 Geo. 3. c. 98
- Territorial extent: United Kingdom

Dates
- Royal assent: 1 July 1816
- Commencement: 1 July 1816 (Note: The Acts of Parliament (Commencement) Act 1793)
Other legislation
Amended by	Post Office (Repeal of Laws) Act 1837; Statute Law Revision Act 1873; Ministers of the Crown Act 1937; National Loans Act 1968; Statute Law (Repeals) Act 1978

Status: Amended

Text of statute as originally enacted

Revised text of statute as amended

A Consolidated Fund Act normally becomes spent on the conclusion of the financial year to which it relates. However, the Consolidated Fund Act 1816 (56 Geo. 3. c. 98) is still in force, since it combined the consolidated funds of Great Britain and Ireland into one consolidated fund of the United Kingdom.

== Consolidated Fund (Permanent Charges Redemption) Acts ==
Consolidated Fund (Permanent Charges Redemption) Act 1873 (Note: Section 1.)
- Act of Parliament
- Parliament of the United Kingdom
- Long title: An Act to make provision for the Redemption of divers permanent Charges on the Consolidated Fund and on the Votes of Parliament.
- Citation: 36 & 37 Vict. c. 57
- Territorial extent: United Kingdom

Dates
- Royal assent: 28 July 1873
- Commencement: 28 July 1873
- Repealed: 22 July 2004
Other legislation
Amended by	Consolidated Fund (Permanent Charges Redemption) Act 1883; Mental Health Act 1959; Statute Law (Repeals) Act 1976; Statute Law (Repeals) Act 1986
Repealed by	Statute Law (Repeals) Act 2004
Relates to	Constitutional Reform Act 2005

Status: Repealed

Text of statute as originally enacted

Revised text of statute as amended

Consolidated Fund (Permanent Charges Redemption) Act 1883
- Act of Parliament
- Parliament of the United Kingdom
- Long title: An Act to amend the Consolidated Fund (Permanent Charges Redemption) Act 1873.
- Citation: 46 & 47 Vict. c. 1
- Territorial extent: United Kingdom

Dates
- Royal assent: 20 March 1883
- Commencement: 20 March 1883
- Repealed: 22 July 2004
Other legislation
Amends	Consolidated Fund (Permanent Charges Redemption) Act 1873
Amended by	Statute Law Revision Act 1898; Statute Law Revision Act 1963; Post Office Act 1969; Trustee Savings Banks Act 1985
Repealed by	Statute Law (Repeals) Act 2004

Status: Repealed

Text of statute as originally enacted

Revised text of statute as amended

The Consolidated Fund (Permanent Charges Redemption) Acts 1873 and 1883 was the collective title of the Consolidated Fund (Permanent Charges Redemption) Act 1873 (36 & 37 Vict. c. 57) and the Consolidated Fund (Permanent Charges Redemption) Act 1883 (46 & 47 Vict. c. 1).

== Northern Ireland ==
Consolidated Fund Measure (Northern Ireland) 1974
- Act of Parliament
- Northern Ireland Assembly (1973)
- Long title: A Measure to apply certain sums out of the Consolidated Fund to the service of the years ending on 31st March 1974 and 31st March 1975.
- Citation: 1974 c. 1 (N.I.)
- Territorial extent: Northern Ireland

Dates
- Royal assent: 26 March 1974

The Consolidated Fund Measure (Northern Ireland) 1974 (c. 1 (N.I.)) was a measure of the Northern Ireland Assembly. See further section 5(1) of the Appropriation (Northern Ireland) Order 1974 (SI 1974/1266) (NI 1).

== Bibliography ==
- Bradley, A.W.; Ewing, K.D. (2003). Constitutional and Administrative Law (13th ed.). London: Pearson. pp. 202–203. ISBN 0-582-43807-1.
- HM Treasury (2000). Government Accounting: A Guide on Accounting and Financial Procedures. London: Stationery Office Books. ISBN 0-11-702668-9.
- Norman Wilding and Philip Laundy. "Consolidated Fund Acts". An Encyclopaedia of Parliament. Third Edition. Frederick A Praeger. New York and Washington. 1968. Pages 167 and 168. See also pages 24, 25, 255, 264, 536 and 596.
- Will Bateman. Public Finance and Parliamentary Constitutionalism. Cambridge University Press. 2020. Page 30 et seq.
- Edward Hamilton, "Ways and Means Advances", 1893, reproduced in Wormell (ed). National Debt in Britain, 1850-1930. Routledge. 1999. Volume 6. Pages 117 & 118 to 121. See also pages 83 and 202.
