= Cardus (surname) =

Cardus is a surname. Notable people with the surname include:

- Ana Cardus (born 1943), Mexican ballerina and ballet master
- Carlos Cardús (born 1959), Spanish motorcycle road racer
- Neville Cardus (1888–1975), English writer and critic
- Ricard Cardús (born 1988), Spanish motorcycle road racer, nephew of Carlos
