= Statute Law Revision Act 1898 =

Act of the Parliament of the United Kingdom

Statute Law Revision Act 1898 (Note: Section 4.)
- Act of Parliament
- Parliament of the United Kingdom
- Long title: An Act for further promoting the Revision of the Statute Law by repealing Enactments which have ceased to be in force or become unnecessary.
- Citation: 61 & 62 Vict. c. 22
- Territorial extent: United Kingdom

Dates
- Royal assent: 25 July 1898
- Commencement: 25 July 1898 (Note: The Acts of Parliament (Commencement) Act 1793.)
- Repealed: 19 November 1998
Other legislation
Repeals/revokes	Turnpike Trusts Arrangements Act 1872; Annual Turnpike Acts Continuance Act 1873; Middlesex Sessions Act 1874; Annual Turnpike Acts Continuance Act 1874; Epping Forest Act 1876; Annual Turnpike Acts Continuance Act 1876; Borough Quarter Sessions Act 1877; Annual Turnpike Acts Continuance Act 1877; Annual Turnpike Acts Continuance Act 1878; Public Works Loans Act 1880; Consolidated Fund (No. 1) Act 1882; Consolidated Fund (No. 2) Act 1882; Consolidated Fund (No. 3) Act 1882; Military Manœuvres Act 1882; Prevention of Crime (Ireland) Act 1882; Consolidated Fund (No. 4) Act 1882; Expiring Laws Continuance Act 1882; Corrupt Practices (Suspension of Elections) Act 1882; Appropriation Act 1882; India (Home Charges Arrears) Act 1882; Consolidated Fund (No. 1) Act 1883; Consolidated Fund (No. 2) Act 1883; Prevention of Crime (Ireland) Act, 1882, Amendment (Audience of Solicitors) Act 1883; Consolidated Fund (No. 3) Act 1883; Lord Alcester's Grant Act 1883; Lord Wolseley's Grant Act 1883; Annual Turnpike Acts Continuance Act, 1883; Consolidated Fund (No. 4) Act 1883; City of London Parochial Charities Act 1883; Expiring Laws Continuance Act 1883; Corrupt Practices (Suspension of Elections) Act 1883; Cholera Hospitals (Ireland) Act 1883; Appropriation Act 1883; Annuity (Sir H. Brand) Act 1884; London Brokers Relief Act 1884; Consolidated Fund (No. 1) Act 1884; Consolidated Fund (No. 2) Act 1884; Customs and Inland Revenue Act 1884; Tramways and Public Companies (Ireland) Amendment Act 1884; Public Works Loans Act 1884; Expiring Laws Continuance Act 1884; Cholera Hospitals (Ireland) Act 1884; Appropriation Act 1884; Corrupt Practices (Supervision of Elections) Act 1884; Additional Income Tax Act 1884; Consolidated Fund (No. 1) Act 1884 (Sess. 2); Consolidated Fund (No. 2) Act 1885; Cape of Good Hope (Advance) Act 1885; Consolidated Fund (No. 3) Act 1885; Annual Turnpike Acts Continuance Act 1885; Cholera Hospitals (Ireland) Act 1885; Exchequer and Treasury Bills Act 1885; Revising Barristers Act 1885; Expiring Laws Continuance Act 1885; Appropriation Act 1885; Public Works Loans Act 1885; Registration Appeals (Ireland) Act 1885; Consolidated Fund (No. 1) Act 1886; Consolidated Fund (No. 2) Act 1886; Contagious Diseases Acts Repeal Act 1886; Metropolitan Police (Compensation) Act 1886; Burial Grounds (Scotland) Amendment Act 1886; Appropriation Act 1886; Incumbents of Benefices Loans Extension Act 1886; Shop Hours Regulation Act 1886; Appropriation Act 1886, Session 2; Secret Service Money (Repeal) Act 1886; Submarine Telegraph Act 1886; Belfast Commission Act 1886; Expiring Laws Continuance Act 1886
Amended by	Statute Law Revision Act 1908; Administration of Justice Act 1977
Repealed by	Statute Law (Repeals) Act 1998
Relates to	Repeal of Obsolete Statutes Act 1856; See Statute Law Revision Act

Status: Repealed

Text of statute as originally enacted

The Statute Law Revision Act 1898 (61 & 62 Vict. c. 22) was an act of the Parliament of the United Kingdom.

== Provisions ==
Section 3 of the act provided that the second part of the schedule to this act was to be substituted for so much of the Statute Law Revision Act 1893 (56 & 57 Vict. c. 14) as related to the Record of Title Act (Ireland) 1865 (28 & 29 Vict. c. 88), and that the 1893 act was to be read and construed as if the part so substituted had originally been enacted therein.

== Subsequent developments ==
Section 3 of, and the schedule to, the act was repealed by section 1 of, and the schedule to, the Statute Law Revision Act 1908 (8 Edw. 7. c. 49)), which came into force on 21 December 1908.

Section 2 of the act was repealed by section 32(4) of, and part V of schedule 5 to, the Administration of Justice Act 1977, which came into force on 29 July 1977.

The enactments which were repealed (whether for the whole or any part of the United Kingdom) by the act were repealed so far as they extended to the Isle of Man by section 1(1) of, and schedule 1 to, the Statute Law Revision (Isle of Man) Act 1991, which came into force on 25 July 1991.

The whole act was repealed by section 1(1) of, and group 1 of part IX of schedule 1 to, the Statute Law (Repeals) Act 1998, which came into force on 19 November 1998.

The act was retained for the Republic of Ireland by section 2(2)(a) of, and part 4 of schedule 1 to, the Statute Law Revision Act 2007, which came into force on 8 May 2007.

== See also ==
- Statute Law Revision Act
