= Contagious Diseases Acts =

United Kingdom legislation

Contagious Diseases Prevention Act 1864 (Note: Section 1.)
- Act of Parliament
- Parliament of the United Kingdom
- Long title: An Act for the Prevention of Contagious Diseases at certain Naval and Military Stations.
- Citation: 27 & 28 Vict. c. 85
- Territorial extent: United Kingdom (Note: Section 3.)

Dates
- Royal assent: 29 July 1864
- Commencement: 29 July 1864 (Note: Section 23.)
- Expired: 29 July 1867
- Repealed: 11 August 1875
Other legislation
Amended by	Contagious Diseases Act 1866
Repealed by	Statute Law Revision Act 1875
Relates to	Contagious Diseases Act 1869

Status: Repealed

Text of statute as originally enacted

Contagious Diseases Act 1866
- Act of Parliament
- Parliament of the United Kingdom
- Long title: An Act for the better Prevention of Contagious Diseases at certain Naval and Military Stations.
- Citation: 29 & 30 Vict. c. 35
- Territorial extent: United Kingdom (Note: Section 4.)

Dates
- Royal assent: 11 June 1866
- Commencement: 30 September 1866 (Note: Section 2.)
- Repealed: 16 April 1886
Other legislation
Amends	Contagious Diseases Prevention Act 1864
Amended by	Contagious Diseases (Ireland) Amendment Act 1868; Contagious Diseases Act 1869; Statute Law Revision Act 1875
Repealed by	Contagious Diseases Acts Repeal Act 1886

Status: Repealed

Text of statute as originally enacted

Contagious Diseases Act 1869
- Act of Parliament
- Parliament of the United Kingdom
- Long title: An Act to amend The Contagious Diseases Act, 1866.
- Citation: 32 & 33 Vict. c. 96
- Territorial extent: United Kingdom

Dates
- Royal assent: 11 August 1869
- Commencement: 11 August 1869 (Note: The Acts of Parliament (Commencement) Act 1793.)
- Repealed: 16 April 1886
Other legislation
Amends	Contagious Diseases Act 1866
Amended by	Statute Law Revision Act 1883
Repealed by	Contagious Diseases Acts Repeal Act 1886
Relates to	Contagious Diseases Prevention Act 1864

Status: Repealed

Text of statute as originally enacted

The Contagious Diseases Acts (CD Acts) were a series of acts passed by the Parliament of the United Kingdom.

The Contagious Diseases Prevention Act 1864 (27 & 28 Vict. c. 85) was the first, with alterations and additions made by the Contagious Diseases Act 1866 (29 & 30 Vict. c. 35) and the Contagious Diseases Act 1869 (32 & 33 Vict. c. 96).

== Contagious Diseases Prevention Act 1864 ==
In 1862, a committee had been established to inquire into venereal disease (i.e. sexually transmitted infections) in the armed forces. On the committee's recommendation the Contagious Diseases Prevention Act 1864 (27 & 28 Vict. c. 85) was passed. The legislation allowed police officers to arrest women suspected of being prostitutes in certain ports and army towns. Since there was no set definition of prostitution within the act, the question was left to the police officer’s discretion, and women could be arrested even if there was no actual evidence of prostitution. The women were then subjected to compulsory physical examinations for venereal disease.

If a woman was declared to be infected, she would be confined in what was known as a lock hospital until she recovered or her sentence was completed. Men suspected of frequenting prostitutes were not subjected to the same treatment of compulsory checks and confinement. The law was initially aimed at working-class women in towns near military bases, due to the concern that sexually transmitted infections were hampering Britain’s armed forces. The original act only applied to a few selected naval ports and army towns, but by 1869 the acts had been extended to cover eighteen "subjected districts".

Because military men were often unmarried and sodomy was criminalized, prostitution was considered by military authorities to be a necessary evil, so long as the spread of venereal disease could be contained. The Contagious Diseases Prevention Act 1864 stated that women found to be infected could be interned in lock hospitals for up to three months, a period extended to one year with the Contagious Diseases Act 1869. These measures were justified by medical and military officials as the most effective means to shield men from venereal disease. However, no provision was made for the physical examination of prostitutes' male clientele, which became one of the many points of contention in a campaign to repeal the acts.

After 1866, proposals were introduced to extend the acts to the north of England and to the civilian population. It was suggested that this extension would serve to regulate prostitution and stop street disorders caused by it in large cities.

The subject of venereal disease, known at the time as "social disease", created significant controversy within Victorian society. The Contagious Diseases Acts themselves affected the lives of thousands of prostitutes and working-class women. They sparked the debate over inequality between men and women, and were an early political issue that led to women organising themselves and actively campaigning for their rights.

The inconsistent treatment of genders inherent in the acts was a key part of Josephine Butler's campaigns for their repeal. In one of her public letters, she allowed a prostitute to deliver her own account of her personal encounters with men:

It is men, only men, from the first to the last that we have to do with! To please a man I did wrong at first, then I was flung about from man to man. Men police lay hands on us. By men we are examined, handled, doctored. In the hospital it is a man again who makes prayer and reads the Bible for us. We are had up before magistrates who are men, and we never get out of the hands of men till we die!

== Prostitution in Victorian England ==
The level of prostitution was high in Victorian England, such that the acts themselves affected a large proportion of the female workforce in Britain. For several reasons prostitution was predominantly a working class profession. For many working-class women their journey into prostitution was one of circumstance. During the nineteenth century the public began to concern itself with particular social problems, an increasing view of the "ideal woman" was beginning to emerge and the "angel of the home" was becoming a popular stereotype. The underlying expectation of Victorian "respectability" and morality, which particularly valued female chastity and modesty, also played a part in raising the standards for the actions of women. This rise of the middle class domestic morality made it increasingly difficult for women to obtain work in certain professions, causing an increase in such areas as needle-trades, shop girls, agricultural gangs, factory work, and domestic servants, all occupations with long hours and little pay. Low earnings, in some cases, meant that women had to resort to prostitution to be able to provide for themselves and their families, particularly in households where the male breadwinner was no longer around. Prostitution was a way to survive for many women stuck in poverty, but Victorian ideals framed it as a sinful and immoral way of life. A study from the late Victorian period showed that more than 90 per cent of prostitutes in Millbank prison were the daughters of "unskilled and semiskilled workingmen", more than 50 per cent of whom had been servants, the rest having worked in dead-end jobs such as laundering, charring, and street selling.

The nature of the occupation makes it difficult to establish the exact number of prostitutes in operation during the Victorian Period. Judicial reports of the years 1857 to 1869 show that prostitutes were more common in commercial ports and pleasure resorts and less so in hardware towns, cotton and linen manufacturing centres and woollen and worsted centres. The Westminster Review placed the figure between 50,000 and 368,000. This would make prostitution the fourth-largest female occupation. However, the police estimates of known prostitutes portray an entirely different estimate:

Police estimates of known prostitutes

Date	London	England and Wales
1839	6,371	–
1841	9,404	–
1856	8,600	–
1858	7,194	27,113
1859	6,649	28,743
1861	7,124	29,572
1862	5,795	28,449
1863	5,581	27,411
1864	5,689	26,802
1865	5,911	26,213
1866	5,544	24,717
1867	5,628	24,999
1888	5,678	24,311

This table relates only prostitutes known to the police. The unreliability of statistics during the nineteenth century prevents one from knowing if prostitution was increasing or decreasing during this period, but it is clear that Victorians during the 1840s and 1850s thought that prostitution and venereal disease were increasing.

Regulating prostitution was a key part of the government's efforts to control the high level of venereal disease in its armed forces. By 1864, one out of three sick cases in the army was caused by venereal disease; admissions into hospitals for gonorrhoea and syphilis reached 290.7 per 1,000 of total troop strength. Prostitutes found customers within the armed forces, mainly due to servicemen's forced celibacy and the conditions of the barracks the men were forced to endure. The barracks were overcrowded, and had a lack of ventilation and defective sanitation. Very few servicemen were permitted to marry, and even those who were, were not given an allowance to support their wives, which occasionally forced those wives to become prostitutes as well. Since the government wanted to limit the spread of venereal diseases within the armed forces, the initial acts targeted towns near bases and ports. Police officers were permitted to arrest any woman they suspected of being a prostitute. In certain cases, if a brothel was discovered near a base, a police officer was placed outside as a guard to track how many men were coming in and out, along with arresting the women who were under suspicion of prostitution.

The efficacy of the acts in controlling the spread of venereal disease is questionable. Prior to the acts, troop numbers were declining rapidly, from 83,386 to 59,758 over the course of six years. After a ‘Committee on the Contagious Diseases Acts’ was formed to investigate in 1879, evidence showed that many factors other than venereal disease played a part in this reduction. While certain men were discharged for venereal diseases, others were discharged due to bad character, and there was also a significant reduction in recruitment efforts. Additionally, doctors reported that the only improvement made since the acts was in the treatment for venereal disease, with little or no impact on its spread.

== Conditions in lock hospitals ==
If a woman was declared to be infected she would be confined in what were known as lock hospitals. The lock hospitals or lock wards were designed specifically to treat those infected with a venereal disease since 1746. Conditions in lock hospitals were sometimes inadequate. An 1882 survey estimated that there were only 402 beds for female patients in all the voluntary lock hospitals in Great Britain, and out of this number only 232 were "funded for use". Female venereal patients generally had to resort to workhouse infirmaries if there was no availability within a lock hospital.

Depending on the city, there may have been a lock asylum operating in partnership with the lock hospital. Women would receive treatment in the asylum, which was intended to correct their moral deviance. Women were seen as deviant if they were prostitutes, and the goal was to cure them of their sexual desires. The increased expectation of Victorian “respectability” made the asylum treatment much more popular among the general population. In a lock asylum, women were “taught appropriate behaviour through religious instruction, and a decent working-class profession, so that a process of inclusion in respectable society would be fulfilled after a process of exclusion.” For men, their sexual desires were seen as natural impulses that could not and should not be controlled, so they were not subject to the same asylum treatment.

== Opposition and extension ==
=== Early opposition ===
Florence Nightingale's opposition to the "Continental system" or state regulation of prostitution probably delayed passage of the legislation by a couple of years. However, the first Contagious Diseases Prevention Act 1864 was adopted, after scarcely any debate.

In 1862, Nightingale prepared a thorough critique of the regulatory approach in Note on the Supposed Protection Afforded against Venereal Diseases, by recognizing Prostitution and Putting it under Police Regulation. The paper included statistics of hospital admissions for venereal disease for various army units at various stations. It showed that the system of regulation did not result in lower rates of disease. Nevertheless, the legislation proceeded. Nightingale next recruited journalist Harriet Martineau to write on the subject and provided her with background material. She published The Contagious Diseases Acts, as applied to Garrison Towns and Naval Stations, in 1870. The four articles in the series, printed in the Daily News, and credited to “an Englishwoman” ran on each of the last three days of 1869 and the first day of 1870, the last of which launched “The Ladies’ National Association for the Repeal of the Contagious Diseases Acts.” It was co-signed by 124 leading women opponents of the acts. Josephine Butler, who went on to lead the lengthy campaign for repeal, was the third signatory, after Nightingale and Martineau.

When the first woman to qualify as a doctor in England, Elizabeth Garrett, wrote in favour of the acts, Nightingale, using the name “Justina,” opposed her, with two articles, in the Pall Mall Gazette in 1870. Nightingale continued to give support behind-the-scenes to the repeal campaign.

=== Extension ===
In 1867, the Association for Promoting the Extension of the Contagious Diseases Acts was established and was just as prominent in publishing pamphlets and articles as the Ladies National Association for the Repeal of the Contagious Diseases Acts was. The Association strongly campaigned for the extension of the Contagious Diseases Acts outside of the naval and army towns and for them to be made applicable to the whole of the country, as they believed this was the best way of regulating prostitution. The Contagious Diseases Act 1869 extended the law across the whole country.

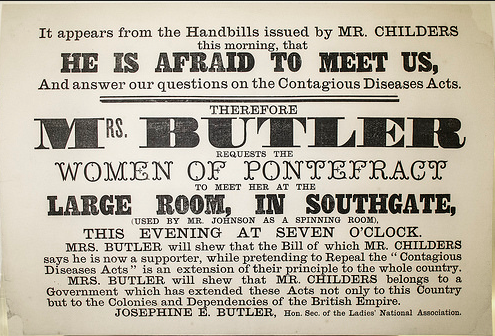
Notice printed during the 1872 Pontefract by-election campaign, calling for the repeal of the Contagious Diseases Acts and attacking Hugh Childers.

=== Later opposition ===
The Contagious Disease Acts were passed very quickly and quietly through the government and were not reported on much in the press because sexual diseases were thought of as inappropriate for public debate. However, as time went on, the impacts of the laws became more widely known and English citizens began to discover more about the harsh treatments and conditions they mandated.

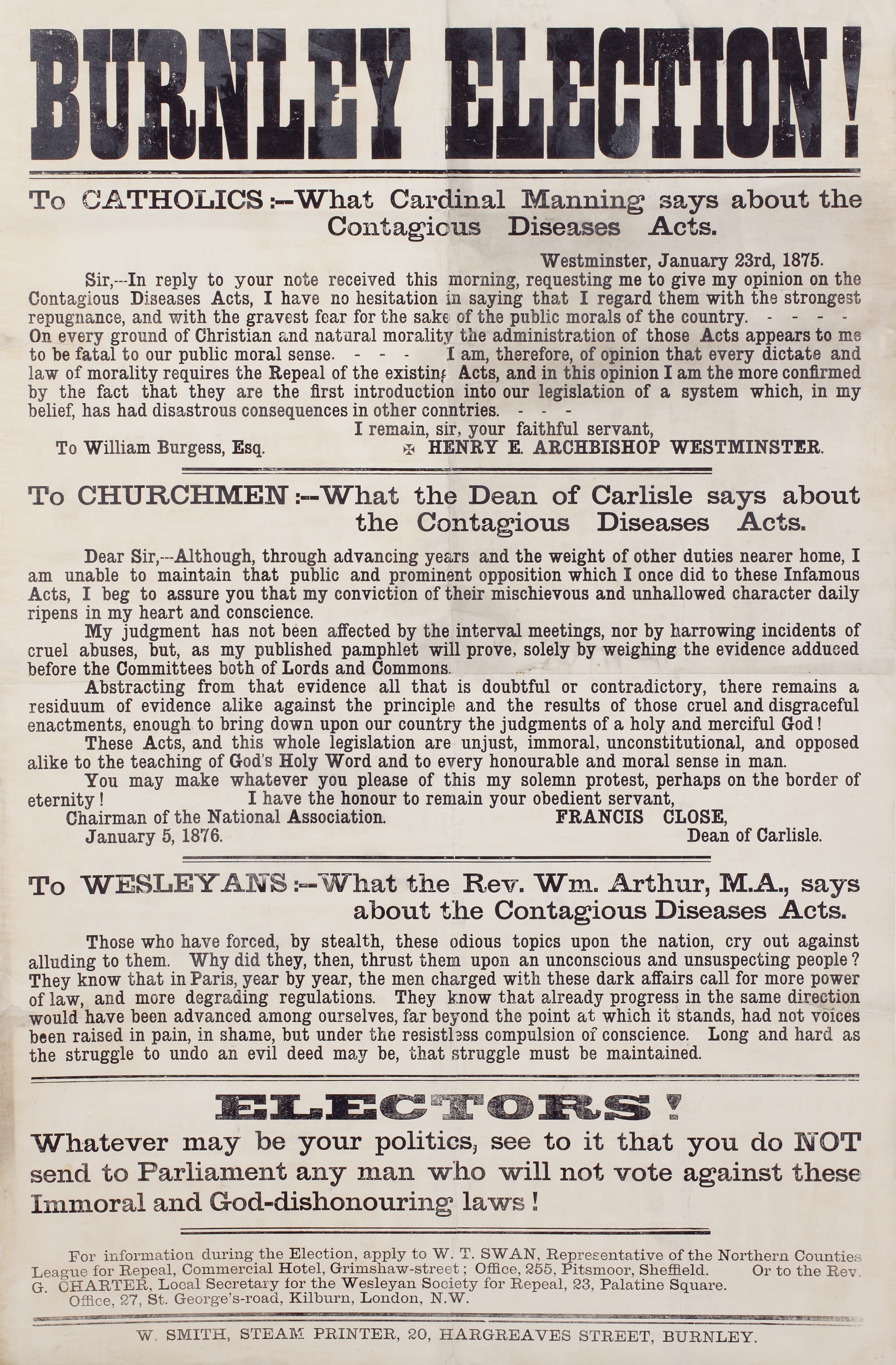
Poster printed during the 1876 Burnley by-election campaign, calling for the repeal of the Contagious Diseases Acts.

In 1870, the National Association for the Repeal of the Contagious Diseases Acts was established. This group initially barred women from its meetings, however, leading to the establishment of the Ladies National Association for the Repeal of the Contagious Diseases Acts by Josephine Butler. These repeal organizations attracted the vigorous support of moralists and feminists but also those more generally concerned with civil liberties, especially since the acts violated basic human rights. Both groups actively campaigned against the acts and between 1870 and 1885: 17,365 petitions against the acts bearing 2,606,429 signatures were presented to the House of Commons, and during the same period, more than 900 meetings were held. The opponents struck a chord with the public consensus on the issues surrounding the acts including double standards and lack of consent.

Josephine Butler also published essays and spoke at several meetings to rally others in support of repealing the Contagious Disease Acts. These events included the “Influential Meeting of the Ladies”, “The Ladies’ Appeal and Protest”, the “MS LNA Circular”, and a “A Few Words Addressed to True Hearted Women.” Butler’s speeches highlighted exactly what impact the acts had on the lives of working-class women. In one of her speeches, she stated “it was recorded that virtuous women had been taken up, virtuous women had been insulted, wives had been taken up and insulted, and most justly, “a medical rape," meaning arrested women were often forced into an examination without their consent. Butler described how police officers could arrest any woman they suspected of prostitution, and had arrested several women who were not infected but still forced into an exam.

Another woman who took a lead calling for the repeal of the acts was Elizabeth Blackwell, a doctor who used education to spread public awareness. As a member of the Moral Reform Union, she urged members to stand against the acts and was one of the few doctors to speak up in opposition of them. Blackwell also emphasized how women and men were not receiving the same treatment under the law. In many of her speeches at conferences, she condemned the inherent double standard in the acts and “aimed to take the responsibility of purity gatekeeping out of the hands of the women and shift some of the responsibility onto men as well.”

Similar to Florence Nightingale’s approach mentioned above, Dr. Charles Bell Taylor and William Paul Swain released a paper in 1869 on their observations of the acts, in which they criticized the lack of police investigation or evidence required to bring women into a lock hospital or asylum. They argued that it was incredibly unfair that the treatment was not the same towards men with disease. Furthermore, their results highlighted that the acts did not decrease the spread of disease at all. Additional discourse from their report states that “the public at large is wholly ignorant of the subject, and a due regard for the public welfare urgently demands that the question shall be generally and exhaustively discussed.”

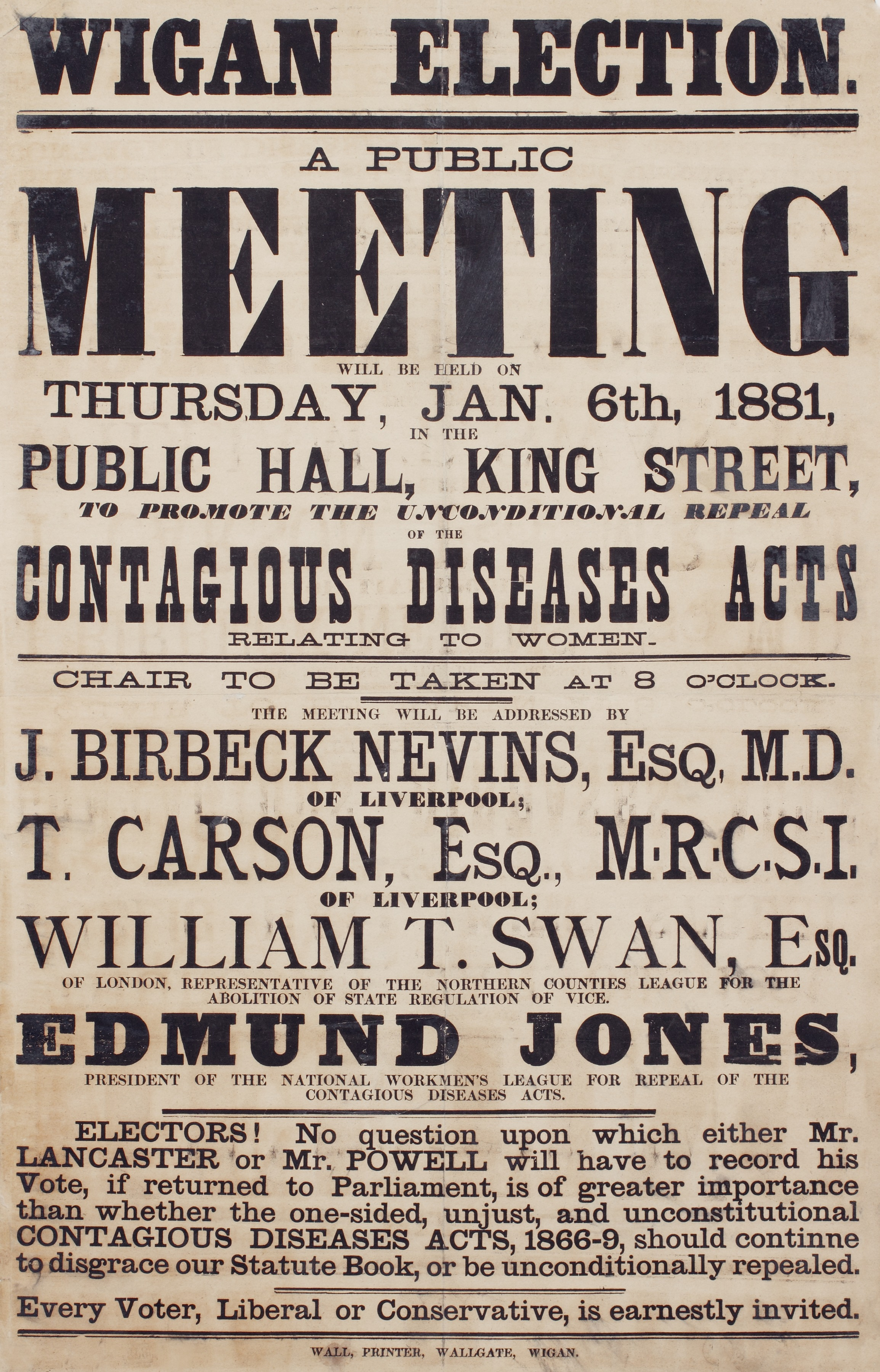
Poster printed during the 1881 Wigan by-election campaign, announcing a public meeting.

== Repeal ==
After years of protesting, the men and women of the National Association and the Ladies National Association gradually won the battle over the Contagious Diseases Acts, and, in 1886, the acts were finally repealed. In the years that followed, doctors and researchers discovered that voluntary submission to be treated for sexually transmitted diseases was much more effective than the original compulsion that came with the acts.

== Archives ==
Extensive archives on the campaign to repeal the Contagious Diseases Acts are held at the Women's Library at the Library of the London School of Economics.

== See also ==
- Regulation system
- Elizabeth Garrett Anderson
- Edward Backhouse
- Josephine Butler
- Millicent Fawcett
- History of feminism
- Hugh Price Hughes
- John Stuart Mill
- Henry Wilson (British politician)

== Bibliography ==
- Sigworth, E. M.; Wyke, T. J. (1980). "A Study of Victorian Prostitution and Venereal Disease". In Vicnius, M. (ed.). Suffer and Be Still: Women in the Victorian Age. Methuen & Co.
- Vicinus, Martha (22 September 1973). Suffer and Be Still: Women in the Victorian Age. Indiana University Press. pp. 256. ISBN 978-0253201683.
- Walkowitz, Judith R. (1980). Prostitution and Victorian Society: Women, Class, and the State. Cambridge University Press. p. 360. ISBN 978-0521270649.
