= Prostitution in Denmark =

Prostitution in Denmark was partly decriminalised in 1999, based partly on the premise that it was easier to police a legal trade than an illegal one. Third-party activities, such as profiting from brothel administration and other forms of procuring, remain illegal activities in Denmark, as do pimping and prostitution of minors.

== History ==
=== Early period ===
The Civil Code of 1683, or Christian 5.s Danske Lov (also enacted in the Danish province of Norway as the Civil Code of 1687 or Christian Vs Norske Lov) explicitly banned extramarital sex (including prostitution) as fornication. Danish law prescribed jail for men and whipping for women caught in fornication.

Prostitution ("professional fornication") was regulated in Denmark during the nineteenth century, with police playing an active part. Nineteenth-century policies to prostitution were driven by the idea that it was a primary source for sexually transmitted diseases, with women being registered and subject to increasingly regular examinations. In 1815, registration of prostitutes was introduced in Copenhagen, with women being registered as prostitutes in the police records, forced to register at a (police surveilled) 'tolerated' brothel and subjected to regular examinations, with forced hospitalisation during illness. Technically prostitution was still illegal, so regulation was carried out discreetly by order of King Frederick VI (1808–1839). On 11 February 1863, this policy was officially recognised and given some legal ground, and in 1874, the system of regulated prostitution was officially introduced in Danish law, with legal grounds for forced examination and hospitalisation of suspected prostitutes.

These policies became the target of women's groups and religious groups, such as the Foreningen imod Lovbeskyttelse for Usædelighed, forcing some relaxation in 1885. Brothels were eventually banned in 1901, and in 1906 forceful examination was abandoned.

=== Modern era ===
Decriminalisation occurred in 1999. In 2006, the government announced a campaign to combat prostitution and racketeers involved in organising the trade and human trafficking, following a commissioned police report entitled Strategi for en styrket politimæssig indsats mod prostitutionens bagmænd (Strategy for an enhanced police effort against the masterminds of prostitution). Justice Minister Lene Espersen (DFK) announced an intensified police effort against traffickers while promising a more sympathetic approach to victims and witnesses, with new police reforms effective 1 January 2007. This would replace an earlier strategy due to expire at the end of 2006. In February 2013, Justice Minister Morten Bødskov announced further measures and introduced a bill, arising from the 2012 report of the Criminal law Council, extending provisions against exploitation from brothels to escort services and street prostitution, increasing penalties and giving police more powers.

=== Review 2012 ===
In 2009, the Ministry of Justice ordered the Criminal Code Council (Straffelovrådet) to undertake a comprehensive review of Chapter 24, and they delivered their report in November 2012. In the terms of reference, they were asked specifically to comment on whether the buying of sex should be banned. Amongst their recommendations were;

- To introduce a new comprehensive provision for the involvement of a person under 18 years in prostitution
- Eliminating special provisions for the participation of 18- to 20-year-olds in prostitution
- That prostitution business in other forms than keeping a brothel be covered by including the provision of escort services
- To decriminalise the involvement of third parties in prostitution, where the agent does not operate by exploiting the prostitution of others
- The removal of the Penal Code provisions involving the request or invitation to fornication that arouses public indignation
- To eliminate the possibility that a person is prevented from entering a particular restaurant for the sole reason that he or she works as a prostitute

In addition, the Council proposed adjusting the maximum penalties for the participation of a child under 18, for payment or promise of payment, having sexual relations with a client, or for being a spectator to a show with pornographic performances involving a child under 18, in order to meet the demands of the EU directive on combating the sexual abuse of children. They also proposed adjusting the maximum penalties for aiding the prostitution of others.

With regards to a ban on buying sex, the Council concluded that such a ban would only be justified as a moral rejection of the purchase of sex. With the knowledge on prostitution in Denmark and the information on the experience of the ban on buying sex in other countries, the council's opinion was that a ban on buying sex will not have a significant positive impact in any other respects than the punishing those who purchase sex. On the contrary, a ban on buying sex could have negative consequences for a number of prostitutes in terms of worsening economic conditions and in the form of increased stigma.

On receiving their report, the Minister of Justice (Justitsministeren) Morten Bødskov made these remarks: "The government has also decided to follow the Criminal Code Council recommendation not to impose a ban on buying sex (købesex). The Criminal Council study shows that a ban on buying sex is not likely to lead to a decrease in prostitution or the exploitation of prostitutes, but rather is likely to have negative consequences for the prostitutes." (21 November 2012). (Note: "Regeringen har desuden besluttet af følge Straffelovrådets anbefaling om ikke at indføre et forbud mod købesex. Straffelovrådets undersøgelse viser, at et forbud mod købesex ikke kan forventes at føre til at fald i prostitutionen eller i udnyttelsen af prostituerede, men tværtimod må forventes at have negative konsekvenser for de prostituerede.")

=== Legal texts ===
§ 228
(1) Any person who-

1) induces another to seek a profit by sexual immorality with others; or

2) for the purpose of gain, induces another to indulge in sexual immorality with others or prevents another who engages in sexual immorality as a profession from giving it up; or

3) keeps a brothel; -shall be guilty of procuring and liable to imprisonment for any term not exceeding four years.

(2) The same penalty shall apply to any person who incites or helps a person under the age of twenty-one (21) to engage in sexual immorality as a profession, or to any person who abets some other person to leave the Kingdom in order that the latter shall engage in sexual immorality as a profession abroad or shall be used for such immorality, where that person is under the age of twenty-one (21) or is at the time ignorant of the purpose.

§ 229
(1) Any person who, for the purpose of gain or in frequently repeated cases, promotes sexual immorality by acting as an intermediary, or who derives profit from the activities of any person engaging in sexual immorality as a profession, shall be liable to imprisonment for any term not exceeding three years or, in mitigating circumstances, to simple detention or a fine.

(2) Any person who lets a room in a hotel or an inn for the carrying on of prostitution as a profession shall be liable to simple detention or imprisonment for any term not exceeding one year or, in mitigating circumstances, to a fine.

§ 233
Any person who incites or invites other persons to prostitution or exhibits immoral habits in a manner which is likely to annoy others or arouse public offence shall be liable to simple detention or to imprisonment for any term not exceeding one year or, in mitigating circumstances, to a fine.

== Demographics ==
The US State Department said that a 2008 report from the National Board of Social Services states that police estimate the number of persons involved in prostitution is approximately 5,500.

The traditional center for prostitution in Copenhagen is the district behind the Copenhagen Central Rail Station (mainly Istedgade, Halmtorvet and Skelbækgade). At the commencement of 2009, the number of street-based sex workers and sex-oriented businesses in the area was declining, but there appeared to be a growth in numbers by the middle of that same year. Most of the people entering the industry originated from Eastern Europe and Africa.

Like many other European cities, many sex workers now use internet-based advertisements for incall and outcall services.

=== Migration and sex trafficking ===
A 2009 study by TAMPEP estimated that migrant workers make up 65% of all prostitutes in Denmark. However, the most recent report from the Servicestyrelsen agency states that about half of the sex workers in Denmark are migrants. The largest group, about 900, come from Thailand and, typically, these workers hold a residence permit or Danish citizenship. The migrant workers are entitled to a wide range of social and health benefits, but are not always aware that such services exist for them. The next largest group, totaling about 1,000, are from European Union (EU) countries in Central and Eastern Europe, but tend to commute between Denmark and their homeland; such individuals are therefore not entitled to receive assistance from Danish social services. The third largest sex worker migrant group, from Africa (especially Nigeria), numbers around 300 and a number of the African migrants commute between other Schengen Area countries and Denmark. (A similar situation exists in Norway.)

A number of women from all three migrant groups may be victims of human trafficking, the actual proportion is unknown, with no reliable figures detailing the number of trafficked persons currently available for analysis. In 2008 the police met with 431 women suspected of association with trafficking and 72 were confirmed to be victims. According to Copenhagen police, women are recruited in their native countries, transported to Denmark, and then forced into prostitution.

== Clients ==
A 2005 study of male clientele by Claus Lautrups found that 14% of Danish men have paid for sex at least once.

== Political debates ==
The then-Social Democrat (S) government of Poul Nyrup Rasmussen reformed the penal code on 17 March 1999, coming into force on 1 July 1999 to decriminalise prostitution. The Social Democrats lost power in 2001.

As elsewhere in Scandinavia, there has been a continuing debate about the status of prostitution laws. The then-opposition Social Democrats and feminist groups favoured outlawing the buying of sexual acts in 2009. This would have put Denmark in line with Sweden, Norway, and Iceland, Norway having adopted such legislation in 2009. This position was supported by a number of opposition parties, including the Red-Green Alliance (Enhedslisten, EL) and the Socialist People's Party (SF), but not the Social Liberals (R). This position had little popular support, only about 26% supporting the measure. (see Public opinion). At that time, Denmark was governed by a centre-right minority government consisting of the Liberal Party (Venstre, V) and the Conservative People's Party (Det Konservative Folkeparti, DKF).

In June 2011, responding to both an opinion poll and recent research (which see) the opposition Social Democrats (S), supported by the Socialist People's Party (SF), were in favour of the Swedish model of banning the purchase of sex, and did not consider the issue of rights identified in the 2011 poll. This put them at odds with the minority governing parties, the Liberals (Venstre) (V), although the position of the junior governing party, the Conservatives's (K), position was less clear. On the other hand, the opposition People's Party (DF) was more supportive of rights, looking to New Zealand. In Denmark's complex political mosaic, the Radicals (Social Liberals) (R), who were divided on the issue, were in a position of holding the balance of power on the issue. It was anticipated that if the Social Democrats were returned to power, they would follow Sweden's example.

In the September 2011 elections, the centre-right coalition lost power to a centre-left coalition led by the Social Democrats, together with the Social Liberals and the Socialist People's Party (Socialistisk Folkeparti, SF), and were in a position to change the laws. However, the Socialist People's Party withdrew from the coalition on 30 January 2014, leaving the Social Democrats heavily dependent on the support of the opposition Venstre, and consequently having to modify their election promises, although the Socialist People's party continue to support the government.

== Public opinion ==
A public opinion poll in 2011 showed that 61% of Danes think Danish sex workers should have more rights, and their profession recognised. Support was found by the majority of voters for all parties, but most noticeably for the relatively small Liberal Alliance (LA). The question was: "In Denmark, prostitution is legal, and prostitutes are in principle taxable. Prostitution is not recognised as a profession, and the prostitutes are not able to join a union, receive benefits, or be eligible for employment insurance. Are you in favour or opposed to prostitutes being allowed to join a union in order to receive benefits and employment insurance?"

== Research ==
In 2010, the Danish government, responding to criticisms that the debate on prostitution was largely based on myths and stereotypes, allocated DKK 4 million for a national survey by Det Nationale Forskningscenter for Velfærd, which was published in 2011 as Prostitution i Danmark. The report stressed that prostitution cannot be treated as a monolithic or homogeneous entity, in particular drawing a distinction between outdoor (street) and indoor work. It suggested a more targeted approach, pointing out that most sex workers had chosen their profession, rather than being coerced.

== Autonomous constituent countries ==
=== Faroe Islands ===
Under Danish Jurisdiction, the legal status of prostitution remains lawful. However, there is no evidence of organised prostitution within the self-governing territory.

=== Greenland ===
Prostitution in Greenland is illegal. Although the country is subject to the law of Denmark in most areas of legislation, Denmark's decriminalisation of prostitution in 1999 has not been applied in Greenland. In addition, Greenland is exempt from the obligations of the Palermo Protocol on human trafficking to which Denmark is a signatory, but there is little evidence of human trafficking in Greenland. A report published in 2008 indicated that Greenland had no signs of visible or organised prostitution, no services directed specifically at prostitutes and no instances of prostitution-related court cases. It did, however, refer to claims that transactional sex had sometimes been used, for example, in return for temporary housing. In a tradition associated with Greenlandic Inuit, hosts have been reported to have offered their wives to guests in a form of "hospitable prostitution". The colonists who founded the country's capital Nuuk in 1728 included prostitutes among their number.

== See also ==
- Nordic sexual morality debate
- Abortion in Denmark
- Pornography in Denmark

== Bibliography ==
=== Nordic policies ===
- May-Len Skilbrei. Prostitution Policy in the Nordic Region. Ashgate 2013 ISBN 978-1-4094-4426-8
- May-Len Skilbrei and Charlotta Holmström. The ‘Nordic model’ of prostitution law is a myth. The Conversation 16 December 2013
- Skilbrei, May-Len & Charlotta Holmström (2013): Prostitution Policy in the Nordic Region. Ambiguous Sympathies, Farnham: Ashgate.

=== History ===
- Pedersen: Prostitution in Denmark 1860-1906. Int Fed Res Women’s Hist 2003
- Merete Bøge Pedersen: Tempting outcasts. On common prostitutes in the 19th century. Bibliotek for Læger 2006;198:38-57

=== Regulation ===
- Prostitution legislation: Will they go the same way? NIKK 19 March 2009
- Straffelovrådets betænkning om seksualforbrydelser. Betænkning nr. 1534. November 2012 Criminal Code Council review of sexual offences 2012

=== Migration ===
- Sex work in Europe - A mapping of the prostitution scene in 25 European countries TAMPEP 2009
- Marlene Spanger. Between Suppression and Independence. Transnational Prostitution of Black Women in Denmark. NIKK 2002
- Rasmus Karkov. Myths about the prostitute lifestyle. Science Nordic 19 August 2012

=== Health ===
- Ida Blom. Medicine and morality - legislation on venereal diseases in Denmark and Norway c. 1900-1994. Michael 2010;7:321-330
- Ishøy T, Ishøy PL, Olsen LR. Street prostitution and drug addiction. Ugeskrift for Lægerer. 2005 Sep 26;167(39):3692-6. In Danish

=== Other ===
- Armario and Dollner: Prostitution in Denmark. Humanity in Action 2002
- Danish stance on prostitution. Kvinfo Dec. 2006
- Prostitution of poverty or sexual self-determination? Kvinfo June 2010
- Approaching Prostitution: Differences Need not be Barriers : An Analysis of Interdisciplinary Collaboration in Servicestyrelsen's Prostitution Department. Emily Childers-Brocks Masters Thesis Feb 2010, Aalborg
- Rasmus Karkov. What drives a prostitute. Science Nordic 7 March 2012
