= Gothenburg's Women's Association =

Swedish women's organisation (1884–1891)

Gothenburg Women's Association (Swedish: Göteborgs Kvinnoförening) was the first women's organisation active in Gothenburg, Sweden's second largest city. It was active from 1884 to 1891. It published the radical magazine Framåt (Forward).

Göteborgs Kvinnoförening was founded 30 October 1884 by a group of liberal upper-class women in Gothenburg under the leadership of Mathilda Hedlund (chairperson 1884–88), the daughter of the radical liberal publicist Sven Adolf Hedlund, and had 89 members during its first year. It was founded as a local answer to Fredrika Bremer Association, which was founded in Stockholm the same year. Its purpose was to work for reforms in women's rights and the position of women in society through information and debate.

The association organized a library for women; educational lectures for poor women; an employment agency for women; offered meals to poor women; arranged for vacation trips for school children; offered meals for poor children; organized a pension fund which paid for sick leave for women; organized the charity secondhand store chain Myrorna; and founded a society for women's gymnastics. It debated important issues for women such as the dress reform, and organized protests against the regulated prostitution in line with the Svenska Federationen.

In 1886, the association published the radical women's magazine Framåt, with Alma Åkermark as editor and Eva Brag among its contributors. Later that same year, however, Åkermark participated in the Sedlighetsdebatten by publishing articles of sexual liberation for women, such as the novel Pyrrhussegrar by Stella Kleve. This caused a scandal, and though Åkermark were supported by some of the members, such as the chairperson Mathilda Hedlund, the members voted to withdraw their support to the paper in November with a marginal of nine votes – Åkermark managed to publish the paper for three more years, however.

The chairperson, Mathilda Hedlund, left Sweden for Denmark after her marriage in 1888, and Göteborgs Kvinnoförening was dissolved in 1891. Many of the activities founded by it continued, however, and in 1903, it was succeeded by the local Gothenburg branch of the National Association for Women's Suffrage, founded and chaired by Frigga Carlberg, previously a leading member of the Göteborgs Kvinnoförening.
