= Liga Portuguesa Abolicionista =

Liga Portuguesa Abolicionista (LPA) (English: "The Portuguese Abolitionist League"), was a Portuguese anti-prostitution women's organization, founded on 1 September 1926. It was the Portuguese equivalent of the British Ladies National Association for the Repeal of the Contagious Diseases Acts. It was active until 1957.

== History ==
LPA was founded in 1926 by Arnaldo Brazão and Domingas Lazary do Amaral. LPA was a branch of the Conselho Nacional das Mulheres Portuguesas, and an associate with the International Abolitionist Federation. It was based in Lisbon.

It was established with the purpose to repeal the so-called regulation system, which required prostitute women to register be and subject to regular medical examination to prevent sexually transmitted infections.

It was a sub-group of the Conselho Nacional das Mulheres Portuguesas. It worked against the sexual exploitation of women and children within the sex industry, and the sexual double standards that excused it.

The LPA condemned the opression of women and children under the regulation system of prostitution, and the sexual double standard that was the foundation for its toleration. Many well known feminists were members of the LPA, such as Adelaide Cabete, Vitória Pais Freire de Andrade, Aurora Teixeira de Castro and Angelica Viana Porto. LPA arranged two abolitionist congresses: in 1926 and in 1929.

The LPA essentially achieved their goal in 1949, when a reform of the regulation system prohibited any new prostitute being registered at the brothels. This cut of the recruiting of new workers to the sex industry, causing it to die out (prostitution was eventually banned in 1963). LPA dissolved in 1957.

== See also ==
- Finska Federationen
- Foreningen imod Lovbeskyttelse for Usædelighed
- Svenska Federationen
- Nordic sexual morality debate
