= Eva Brag =

Swedish journalist, writer and poet

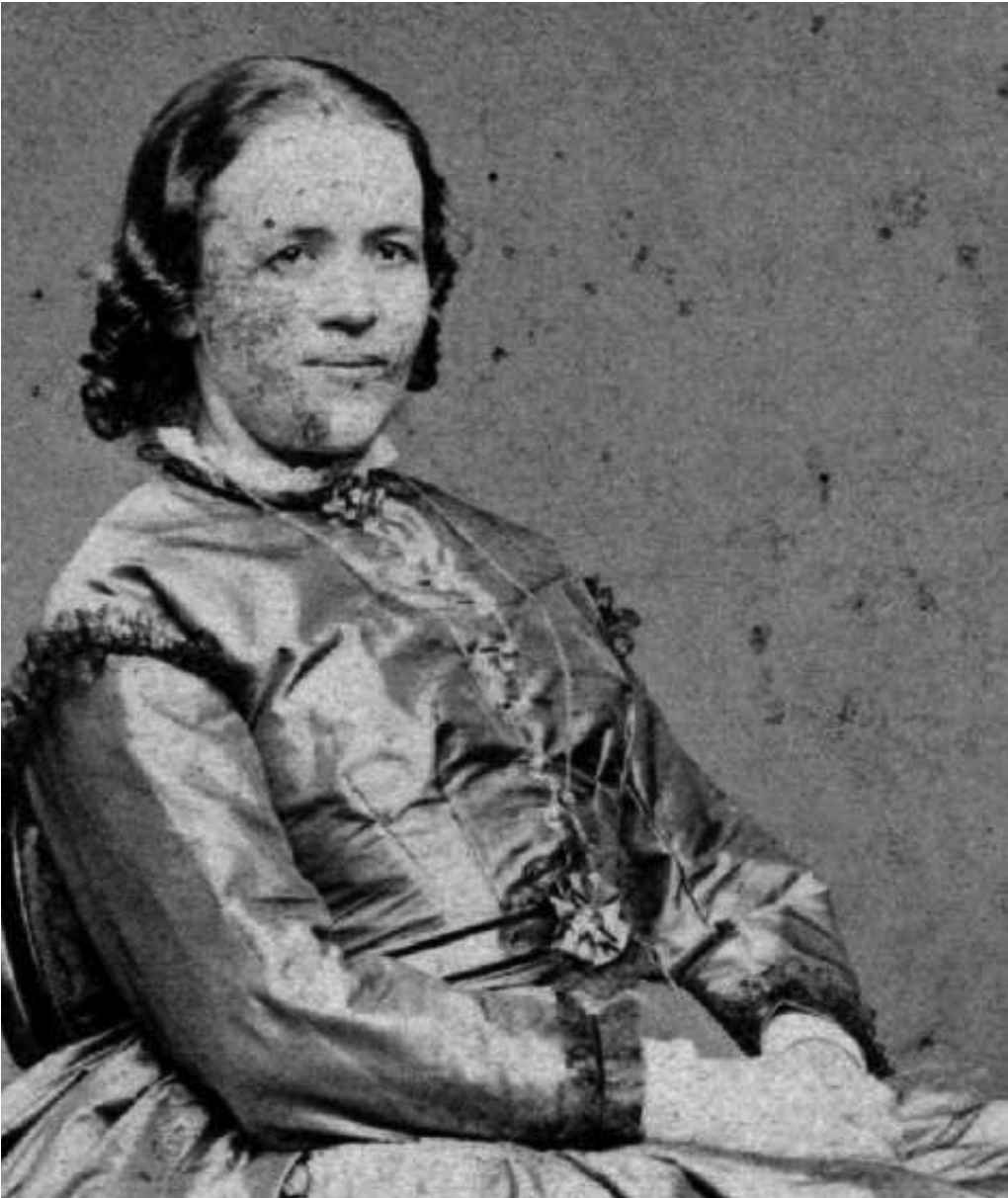
Eva Charlotta Brag

Eva Brag (1829–1913) was a Swedish journalist, writer and poet.

== Biography ==
She was born to Jonas Brag, professor at the Lund University. She was given a high education at home and studied Latin, French and English and visited Great Britain and France. She was not allowed to study at the university, because university studies were closed to women until 1870, which affected her badly.

She was employed as a journalist at Göteborgsposten in 1864–1865 and Göteborgs Handels- och Sjöfartstidning in 1865–1889, where she wrote political articles and literary reviews and functioned as temporary chief editor during the absence of the regular chief editor, the progressive Sven Adolf Hedlund. Initially her media career was almost unique at the time and made her one of the first in the pioneer generation of women journalists in Swedish media. She always wrote under pseudonym.

She was also active within the Gothenburg's Women's Association and participated in Framåt, the organ of the association.

She was awarded by the Royal Society of Sciences and Letters in Gothenburg for her poetry in 1857.

== Selected works ==
1. Brag, Eva (1858). Sigurd och Brynhilda: episkt försök efter Völsungasagan. [Göteborg]
2. Brag, Eva (1864). Den nordamerikanska frågan, Stockholm: Bonnier.
3. Brag, Eva (1868). Sjelfviskhetens offer, Göteborg.
4. Brag Eva (1860). Liten Elins julafton i fjor och i år: tvenne sånger på en bekant melodi; tillegnade ej blott alla fattiga barn, utan också alla fattigvårds- och folkskolestyrelser, Göteborg.
5. Brag, Eva (1881). Öfverstens arfvingar. Göteborg

== Sources ==
- Svensk uppslagsbok. Malmö 1939.
- Österberg, Carin et al., Svenska kvinnor: föregångare, nyskapare. Lund: Signum 1990. (ISBN 91-87896-03-6)
- Brag, släkt, urn:sbl:18030, Svenskt biografiskt lexikon, hämtad 2015-11-14.
- Heggestad, Eva: Kritik och kön. 1880-talets kvinnliga kritiker och exemplet Eva Brag. Samlaren. Tidskrift för svensk litteraturvetenskaplig forskning. Årgång 115 1994. Svenska Litteratursällskapet.
