= Alma Åkermark =

Swedish journalist

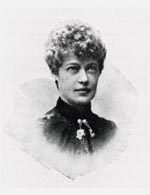
Alma Akermark

Alma Mathilda Åkermark (11 June 1853, Forshälla parish – 4 June 1933, Oscar Fredriks parish) was a Swedish editor, feminist, writer, journalist and women's rights activist. She was a co-founder of the radical feminist women's paper Framåt ('Forward'), and its editor during its entire publication. She wrote under the pseudonym Mark. She was active within the Gothenburg's Women's Association, and a leading figure within the most progressive and radical part of the Swedish and local women's rights movement, and was noted for her involvement in the Sedlighetsdebatten.

== Life ==
Alma Åkermark was the daughter of the Gothenburg merchant Anton Wilhelm Åkermark and Kristina Kristiansson and sister of the painter Isak Åkermark. Her family was acquainted with the family of the progressive politician and publisher Sven Adolf Hedlund. When she lost her father at the age of sixteen, Hedlund gave her financial support to study music and drawing in Neuchâtel in Switzerland, and upon her return to Sweden in 1881, she supporter herself as a teacher in these subjects at the Fruntimmersföreningens flickskola.

Through the Hedlund family, she belonged to the progressive circles in Gothenburg. In 1884, the Gothenburg's Women's Association, the first women's organization in Gothenburg, was founded with Hedlund's daughter Mathilda Hedlund as chair. Åkermark was elected board member the following year.

=== Framåt publication ===
In 1886, Alma Åkermark, Hilma Angered-Strandberg and Mathilda Hedlund founded the women's publication Framåt ('Forward'), with Åkermark as editor and the women's association as publisher. Her spouse since 1887, the telegrapher Albert Breinholm, also participated in the magazine.

Alma Åkermark was a radical social liberal who supported social reforms and encouraged the paper to be a center of public debate. She controversially participated in the contemporary Sedlighetsdebatten about sexual double standards between women and men, in which she supported the side that women should be allowed sexual relations outside of marriage, similarly as men were, without being socially ostracized. Her publication of articles with sexual content in the women's paper placed her in confrontation with the moderate women's movement.

In 1886, she published the novel Pyrrhussegrar ('Pyrrhic Victories') by Stella Kleve, in which a dying, virtuous woman regretted having refused sexual pleasure because of social convention. The book caused a scandal as it collided with contemporary sexual double standards, and the paper lost its support from the women's association, though the chair, Mathilda Hedlund, did support her personally. Sophie Adlersparre, a central figure of the Swedish women's mowevement, also objected to the Kleve publication as the subject of women's sexual pleasure was much to radical in the eyes even of the contemporary women's movement. With the support of the Hedlund family, Alma Åkermark managed to continue publishing the paper herself. Framåt, however, eventually proved to be too radical and controversial for its time. In 1889, the paper discontinued publication when an organized advertising boycott deprived it of its finances, and Alma Åkermark lost her work as a teacher.

=== Later life ===
She left Gothenborg with her spouse and started a new magazine in Nystad in Finland, Nya Tag ('New Efforts'), which only lasted four months. After the death of her spouse in 1891, she was affected by a depression, and returned to Gothenburg, where she was placed in a mental asylum in 1892. Upon her release in 1896, she left for the United States, where she worked as a pattern instructor for a factory in Chicago. In 1909, she became blind and returned to Sweden, where she was cared for by her relatives.

== Sources ==
- http://www.ub.gu.se/kvinn/portaler/kvinnotidskrifter/biografier/akermark.xml
- Bergenheim, Åsa, Alma, sedligheten och det fria ordet. Ingår i: Obemärkta. - Stockholm, 1995. S. 162–198.
- Hirn, Yrjö, Alma Breinholm-Åkermark. - Ingår i: Den förgyllda balustraden. Stockholm, 1953. S. 25–58.
- Nyström, Per, Bannlyst: Alma Åkermark och det moderna genombrottet. Ingår i: Tre kvinnor mot tiden. Stockholm, 1994. S. 167–187.
- Kvinnornas tidning nr 17, 1925
