= Åkermark =

Åkermark is a surname of Swedish origin. Notable people with the surname include:

- Alma Åkermark (1853–1933), Swedish editor, feminist, writer, journalist and women's rights activist
- Arne Åkermark (1902–1962), Swedish art director
- Harald Åkermark (1873–1963), Swedish Navy vice admiral
