= London and Stadt Hamburg =

Brothels in Stockholm, Sweden

London and Stadt Hamburg were the names of two Swedish brothels in Gamla stan in Stockholm between 1838 and 1841. They were part of an attempt by the city authorities to establish state control over prostitution and sexually transmitted infection by brothels licensed and supported by the authorities.

== Background ==
In 18th-century Stockholm, coffee houses established by women, financed by their previous upper-class lovers, were often suspected by the police of being masked brothels, and the waitresses of pubs and bars were suspected prostitutes. These establishments were often raided by the police, who forced the female staff to be subject to physical examination to prevent the spread of sexual diseases: in 1812, a law was introduced which legalized this practice, allowing forced medical examination and treatment of anyone suspected of carrying a sexual disease. The law was met with criticism and opposition, because it led to harassment of women wrongly suspected of prostitution. Therefore, another solution to control sexual disease was needed.

In the 1830s, the Stockholm city authorities (but not the rest of Sweden) decided to adopt the regulation system, a practice of other European countries and establish brothels supported by the state. In the state brothels, the prostitutes would be subjected to regular health checks for sexual disease, and treated if ill. This would allow the authorities to control prostitution and sexually transmitted disease.

== London and Stadt Hamburg ==
In 1838, the city authorities started by issuing two licenses to establish a brothel in the capital: one to the married woman Anna Carlström, who opened the brothel "London", and the other to the widow Maria Martell, who opened the brothel "Stadt Hamburg". The brothels were named after two cities where sexual diseases were thought common, and established in Gamla stan that same year. Martell was evicted and had her licence withdrawn the same year and left her establishment to a male manager, Thure Arenander.

The conditions in the brothels were harsh for the employees. The prostitutes, typically women in their early 20s, were to pay the manager for clothes, cosmetics, food, rent and the alcohol they drank with their clients, which placed them in debt. They were subjected to regular medical examinations and often forced to take time off, which placed them in even deeper debt. They were referred to by their room number, not by name. The conditions were reportedly worse in "Stadt Hamburg" than in "London". The brothels were reportedly popular among upper-class men, and many rich and influential men were quickly seen as regular customers.

The state-licensed brothels project met with great opposition among the public in a country where extra-marital sexual relations was punishable by law, and during the Rabulist riots, the brothels were attacked by protesters who threw stones at them. This made the authorities relocate them. The authorities soon regarded the project as a failure, and withdrew their support. In 1841, "Stadt Hamburg" was reported and closed by the authorities. "London", which no longer enjoyed state support, is believed to have been closed later that year by its own manager, who feared an inspection.

== Aftermath ==
After this, the authorities introduced a new approach to prostitution and sexually transmitted disease: in 1847, the first bureau for registration and regular medical examination of prostitutes was founded. Brothels were illegal, but in practice the police condoned some pubs which had "a disproportionate number of waitresses", i.e. some of them were prostitutes.

== See also ==
- Sara Simonsdotter
- Platskans jungfrubur
