= Hilma Angered Strandberg =

Swedish writer

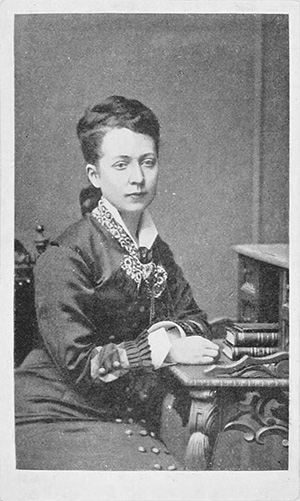
Hilma Angered Strandberg (circa 1890)

Elisabet Kristina Hilma Angered Strandberg (June 10, 1855 in Stockholm - January 23, 1927 in Meran), was a Swedish writer. She mostly wrote under the name Hilma Strandberg of the pseudonym, "Lilian".

== Life ==
She was the daughter of Justice and member of the Swedish Academy Carl Gustaf beach Berg (1825–1874) and his wife Eva Helleday (1830–1869). She attended an ordinary school in Stockholm, but later took private lessons with EM Rappe in Småland. In 1876, she completed training as a telegraph operator and worked as such from 1883 to 1888 in Fjällbacka. During that time, she wrote alleged correspondence to a newspaper at which she was later employed.

In 1886, she became a co-founder of the radical feminist women's paper Framåt ('Forward') of the Gothenburg's Women's Association alongside Mathilda Hedlund and Alma Åkermark.

She married the artist Hjalmar Angered and emigrated with him to the United States, where they lived from 1888 to 1894 and she wrote articles in the form of letters to Swedish newspapers. At the World Exhibition in Chicago in 1893, she was responsible for presenting a Swedish textile company's work to the world, during which time she continued her work as a newspaper correspondent. From 1904 to 1914, she undertook long study trips to the Switzerland and from Italy, continuing to report back to Swedish newspapers and magazines.

== Books ==
Her debut book was a collection of poems, published under the pseudonym "Lilian." Under the same pseudonym, she began to write novels which appeared in e.g. the Gothenburg magazine året om Illustrated. This early work was markedly romantic. In her Swedish-American life, she found useful themes for some strange, pessimistic colored descriptions as in her works the nya världen (The new world). In her books, she criticized double standards and dogmatism, as in the novel På Prairies (The Plains) and in her autobiography Lydia Vik.

== Recognition ==
Strandberg's work was cited by prominent American psychologist G. Stanley Hall, in his pioneering study of adolescence, as a parallel to the famously frank (and allegedly egotistic) female writers Marie Bashkirtseff, Mary MacLane, and Mathilda Malling.

== Works ==
=== Short stories ===
- Västerut, 1888
- Från det gamla och nya landet, 1900
- Under söderns sol (Reisenovellen), 1905
- Ödesglimtar, 1905
- Trollmark, 1907
- På bygator och alpvägar (Reisenovellen), 1915

=== Novels ===
- Den nya världen 1898
- På prärien, 1899
- Lydia Vik, 1904
- Hemma, 1912
- Barbarens son, 1924

== Prizes and awards ==
- Grand Prize of the Nine 1916
