= Ellen Bergman =

Swedish musician and women's rights activist

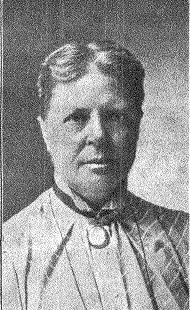
- Ellen Bergman, from Dagny, 1912.
- Born: 5 January 1842; Strängnäs, Sweden
- Died: 5 December 1921 (aged 69); Stockholm, Sweden
- Resting place: Norra begravningsplatsen
- Occupation(s): Musician, educator, women's rights activist

Ellen Bergman (5 January 1842 – 5 December 1921) was a Swedish musician, vocal educator and women's rights activist. She was a member of the Royal Swedish Academy of Music.

== Biography ==
Eleonora (Ellen) Magdalena Bergman was born at Strängnäs, Sweden. In 1864, she began her education at the Royal Swedish Academy of Music (Kungliga Musikaliska Akademien) in Stockholm. She studied cello, organ, harmonic and solo singing, graduating in 1867. She also studied under German singing teacher Mathilde Marchesi. Bergman worked as a singing teacher at the Royal Seminary (Högre lärarinneseminariet) and the Royal College of Music (Kungliga Musikhögskolan) from 1868 to 1899. For her achievements in musical teaching, she was elected a member of the Royal Swedish Academy of Music (Kungliga Musikaliska Akademien) in 1876. Bergman's students included Sven Scholander, Selma Ek, and Dagmar Möller.

From the first half of the 1880s, Bergman was known as a leading member of the Swedish Federation (Svenska Federationen), the Swedish branch of the Ladies National Association for the Repeal of the Contagious Diseases Acts which had first been established in Great Britain during 1869 by Elizabeth Wolstenholme (1833–1918) and Josephine Butler (1828–1906). The organization worked against prostitution and particularly the abusive genital examinations of registered prostitutes. Svenska Federationen deemed the existing Swedish regulation system (Reglementeringssystemet) to be humiliating and socially stigmatizing. Bergman was an active writer and speaker who became involved in a conflict with Swedish playwright and novelist August Strindberg (1849–1912) because of her views of gender, who once referred to her in a letter written in 1884 as djefla maran Ellen Bergman (literally: "The damned mare Ellen Bergman"). She was an early member of Nya Idun, a Swedish women's association, joining in 1891, and a member of the Fredrika Bremer Association.

In the early 1900s, she taught singing in the United States at the Isis Conservatory of Music in California.

She was awarded the Illis quorum in 1899.

Bergman died in Stockholm in 1921 and is buried in Norra begravningsplatsen.

== Other sources ==
- Svanström, Yvonne (2007). Jansdotter Anna, Svanström Yvonne. red. ”Ellen Bergman och svenska Federationen: kvinnoemancipation och sedlighet i Sverige 1880-1900”. Sedligt, renligt, lagligt : prostitution i Norden 1880-1940 (Göteborg: Makadam): sid. 71–105. ISBN 978-91-7061-040-0 (inb.). Libris 10628213
