= Amélie Cederschiöld =

Swedish feminist activist

- Portrait of Amélie Cederschiöld
- Born: Amélie Hilda Maria Sterky; 14 October 1853; Hamburg
- Died: 2 June 1934 (aged 80)
- Burial place: Solna Cemetery
- Known for: feminist activism

Amélie Hilda Maria Cederschiöld (14 October 1853 – 2 June 1934) was a German-Swedish activist and feminist.

== Biography ==
Amélie Cederschiöld was born on 14 October 1853 in Hamburg. She was the daughter of minister Carl Gustaf Sterky and Maria Matilda Moll. 12 October 1871 she married Henrik Cederschiöld (1842 – 1908) in Hamburg.

Cederschiöld is known for her commitment to the Swedish Federation, where she actively participated in the campaign against regulated prostitution in order to promote a more equal and just society. They argued that women's lack of education, employment opportunities, and economic independence made them vulnerable to exploitation. The Swedish Federation advocated for women's rights, including equal pay, education, and access to employment, as a means of combating prostitution. She is described as one of the association's most radical forces. Cederschiöld was also the first corresponding secretary of the Swedish Section of the Theosophical Society.

Amélie Cederschiöld played a significant role in the Federation during its early years, which was a period of high activity. However, she withdrew from the debate after 1884.

Cederschiöld died on 2 June 1934 and is buried in Solna Cemetery in Stockholm, Sweden.
