= Selma Ek =

Swedish operatic soprano

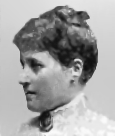
Selma Ek

Selma Ek (3 September 1856 – 3 May 1941) was a Swedish operatic soprano who had an active international career from the 1870s through the 1890s. Like Lilli Lehmann and Lillian Nordica, she was one of those universally talented singers of the late 19th century who was able to master roles from the coloratura, lyric, and dramatic soprano repertoires. The leading Swedish soprano of her day, she was particularly admired for her portrayals of Mozart, Wagner, and Verdi heroines.

== Biography ==
Born in Stockholm, Ek studied with Ellen Bergman and Julius Günther at the Royal College of Music, Stockholm from 1873 to 1878. She later received additional training from Pauline Viardot in Paris. She made her professional opera debut at the Royal Swedish Opera as Agathe in Carl Maria von Weber's Der Freischütz.

Shortly after her debut, Ek was offered a long-term contract with the Royal Swedish Opera, and she was a member of that house up through 1890. She continued to appear at the house as a guest artist up through 1896. She sang a wide repertoire in Stockholm, portraying such roles as Desdemona in Otello, Elisabeth in Tannhäuser, Donna Elvira in Don Giovanni, Eva in Die Meistersinger von Nürnberg, Juliette in Roméo et Juliette, Kristine Gyllenstierna in Johann Gottlieb Naumann's Gustaf Wasa, Philine in Mignon, the Queen of the Night in The Magic Flute, Reiza in Oberon, Sieglinde in Die Walküre, Valentine in the Les Huguenots, and the title role in Djamileh. In 1880 she notably sang the title role in Aida for that opera's first performance in Sweden.

Outside of Stockholm, Ek toured with the Royal Opera for performances in Copenhagen and Gothenburg in 1883. In 1890 she was committed to the Kroll Opera House in Berlin. She was also active as a concert singer and recitalist in her native country and made a few concert appearances in Germany.

Ek died in 1941 at the age of 84. In her will she left 100,000 Swedish kronor to start the "Operasångerska Selma Ek fond", an organization dedicated to supporting talented young opera singers.
