= Anna Carlström =

Swedish brothel owner

- Born: Anna Vickberg; 1780
- Died: 1850 (aged 69–70); Stockholm, Sweden
- Occupations: innkeeper and brothel madam, procurer
- Known for: the owner of one of only two unique brothel licenses ever issued in her country

Anna Carlström, née Vickberg (13 February 1780 – 8 May 1850 in Stockholm) was a Swedish procurer and brothel owner. She was the manager of the brothel "London" in Stockholm, one of the two brothels, London and Stadt Hamburg, which were supported by the authorities in a temporary experiment between 1838 and 1841 to control the spread of sexually transmitted disease. She was the owner of one of only two unique brothel licenses ever issued in her country at the time. Anna Carlström published her memoires in 1841.

== Early life ==
Anna Carlström described her life in her memoirs, published in 1841, which may not give an altogether truthful picture: among other things, she claimed to have been the mother of 22 children.

She was one of six children to Erik Wickberg, General contractor at the Olofsfors estate in Ångermanland, and Brita Christina Eriksdotter. She was allowed schooling until the age of fourteen, and was then made an apprentice of a farmer to learn how to manage a farm, with the prospect of becoming a farmer's wife. As she did not care for this future prospect, she left home and arrived in the capital of Stockholm at the age of seventeen in 1797. According to her own memoirs, she worked as a maidservant, as a weaver at Hässelbyholm and as a children's nurse: in 1801, she was employed as a servant in a family by the name Williamson, which was moving to London in Great Britain, and stayed with them there for half a year before returning to Sweden. Having returned, and for some reason wealthy, she married the tailor Hellbom and settled in Stockholm with him.

After six years of marriage and six children, she was left a destitute widow with two children in circa 1807. She started a business as an innkeeper, a common profession for a widow, and married the shoemaker Johan Löfstedt, with whom she was desperately unhappy and had eight children (all of whom died but one). Widowed after a ten-year marriage, she married in circa 1818 for the third time to Anders Johan Lundholm, a lower rank officer of the navy, with whom she lived for sixteen years, had eight children (all of whom died). She described her third spouse as the love of her life, and his death gave her a depression which forced her to sell her inn.

Finally, she married in circa 1834 to skipper Anders Carlström. Her spouse spent most of his time at sea and she was forced to support herself. She managed to start again as an innkeeper, and had some success, but by 1838, she was indebted, because she was unable to pay what it had cost to establish her new inn.

== Career as a procurer ==
In 1838, the Stockholm authorities, alarmed with the problem of controlling the spread of sexually transmitted disease, decided to try a new policy against prostitution, inspired by contemporary French ideas. Instead of the illegal brothels, which worked in secret and were hard to find and control by the authorities, two brothels were to be given official support. The purpose of this was to make it easier for the authorities to control the spread of sexually transmitted disease. Therefore, the first two official brothel licenses ever was issued by the city's authorities: one of them to the widow Maria Martell, who were to manage the brothel Stadt Hamburg, and the other one to Anna Carlström, who was put in charge of the brothel London. The brothels were named after two cities who were at the time talked about as centers of prostitution and sexually transmitted disease.

In her memoirs, Carlström described her attitude when agreeing to the task: "Times are hard and one must adjust oneself accordingly. If I turn down this opportunity, I will have no way of supporting my creditors, which is my highest wish. On the other hand, were I to continue this business, I will pay my depths and still have a good income during my old age. And remember, my friend, that nowadays the words are 'profit and money!'"

Maria Martell soon gave her license to a male procurer, but Carlström continued with hers. Her brothel was established at Skeppsbron. Her spouse had nothing to do with the business, as he was away at sea most of his time: he protested against her trade, saying it would be too much for her health at her age to manage such a business, but she persuaded him. In her memoirs, published in 1841 when she was apparently still in business, she referred to "London" as an inn rather than a brothel. She remarked of her business: "I have the conviction, that I have spared no effort to satisfy every wish for any one of those, who visit my inn", but also that: "numerous unpleasant incidents occurred more or less daily" of which she was not used to and found exhausting. She stated that she had a lifelong distaste toward criminality, which was the reason to why she always had such a good cooperation with the authorities and her constant willingness to assist them an provide them with useful information, and that it was only the evil police master Hultberg who persisted in his attempts to libel her as a criminal despite her great will of cooperation. In August 1839, "London" was raided by the police and Carlström was arrested and prosecuted for storing stolen goods. She was, however, acquitted from the charges.

The Stockholm authorities, however, abandoned the policy of licensed brothels in 1841, after having received great opposition from the public and also regarded their purpose of controlling the sexually transmitted disease as failed. They thereby retracted their protection of the two brothels London and Stads Hamburg. The brothel Stadt Hamburg was closed the same year by the authorities. It is not known when London was closed, but it is assumed that Carlström closed it in late 1841 in fear of an inspection from the authorities.

== Legacy ==
In 1841, Anna Carlström published her memoirs: “En modig qvinnas händelserika lefnad, Antecknad av Henne Sjelf” ('The Eventful life of a Courageous Woman, Noted by herself').

== See also ==
- Sara Simonsdotter
- Lovisa von Plat
