= Aurora Teixeira de Castro =

Portuguese feminist and first female notary in Portugal

- Born: Aurora Teixeira de Castro; 1891; Porto, Portugal
- Died: 1931 (aged 39–40); Valongo, Portugal
- Occupation: Notary
- Known for: Feminist

Aurora Teixeira de Castro (1891 – 1931) was vice-president in 1926 and 1927 of the feminist Conselho Nacional das Mulheres Portuguesas (National Council of Portuguese Women). She was a lawyer and notary and the first female notary in Portugal.

== Early life and activism ==
Aurora Teixeira de Castro was born in Porto, Portugal in 1891. She studied at the University of Coimbra, where she graduated in Law in 1916. As a member of the Conselho Nacional das Mulheres Portuguesas, she played a major role in one of its early conferences, on the theme of “The legal situation of women in Portugal”, making four separate presentations. These were titled: (1) "The equivalence of the sexes and the equality of the rights and duties of men and women"; (2) "Disadvantage faced by women until the democracy that followed the arrival of the Republic"; (3) "On the concessions that the Republic's legislation made to women" and, (4) "Demands that can be achieved for the perfect equality of the rights of the two sexes". In these presentations she contrasted the roles that women could then play in society, such as holding professional positions, with the fact that they still could not vote nor have the right to keep their salary for themselves if married.

== Campaigning ==
In 1921 she published Reivindicações Sociais e Políticas da Mulher Portuguesa na República (Social and Political Claims of the Portuguese Woman under the Republic). In February 1923, the Council sent a message of thanks to the Minister of Justice and Religious Affairs, António de Abranches Ferrão, for presenting a draft law on the updating of the legal status of married women in relation to the administration of their property. Teixeira de Castro, in an article published in the council's magazine, Alma feminina, recognized that the draft law represented progress for Portuguese women, but continued to advocate the absolute separation of assets. She criticized Abranches Ferrão for failing to propose reforms in some areas while proposing inadequate reforms in others.

In order to celebrate the tenth anniversary of its foundation in 1914, the Council decided to organize a feminist congress. Teixeira de Castro was a member of the organizing committee, which was chaired by Adelaide Cabete, and included Deolinda Lopes Vieira, Maria O'Neill, and Vitória Pais Freire de Andrade. This Feminist and Education Congress was scheduled for March 1924 but was postponed to allow provincial teachers to take part over Easter. It was aimed at studying, discussing and propagating feminist ideas and those related to them, and took place on 4–9 May 1924 in Lisbon. Teixeira de Castro addressed the themes of Social and Political Claims of Portuguese Women in the Republic; and the Situation of Married Women regarding Marital Property.

As the first female notary in Portugal, she also wrote a paper on "Portuguese Notaries-Their History, Evolution and Nature", which was published as a Monograph of the City of Porto in 1926.

== A playwright ==
Aurora Teixeira de Castro was vice-president of the Conselho Nacional das Mulheres Portuguesas in 1926–27. In 1927 she published two plays with the umbrella heading of Teatro (Theatre); one in five acts called A Sombra (The Shadow), and a three-act piece called Mistérios de Amor (Mysteries of Love). These appear to have had primarily a polemical function, and it is not reported whether they were ever performed. The plays include many references to educational practices and to the right of women to have the same education as men. Interestingly, she had some of the male characters arguing in support of feminism.

Aurora Teixeira de Castro died in Valongo near Porto in 1931. She has roads named after her in Almada and Lisbon.
