= Swedish Federation =

Svenska Federationen (English: 'Swedish Federation'), was the Swedish equivalent of the British Ladies National Association for the Repeal of the Contagious Diseases Acts. It was established in 1878 with the purpose to repeal the so-called reglementation system, which required prostitute women to registration and regular medical examination to prevent sexually transmitted infections.

It also opposed the sexual double standard, which regarded men as naturally unable to sexual self-control and viewed prostitutes as the sole problem. The Svenska Federationen was dissolved after the reglementation system was abolished in 1918. Between 1878 and 1905, it published its own paper, Sedlighetsvännen (Friend of Virtue).

== History ==
=== Background ===
In 1812, a new law allowed for forced medical examination of people suspected for suffering of a sexually transmitted infection to prevent the spreading of disease. The law did not specify gender, but it was in practice mostly forced upon women in the capital suspected of prostitution. The reason for this was the contemporary sexual view that men were incapable of sexual self-control, and the focus of the authorities were therefore placed on prostitute women, who were described as the problem in the battle against sexual disease. However, the law was met with rising opposition, as the police harassed women on mere suspicion of being prostitutes, such as for example bar waitresses, and a different method was therefore deemed necessary. The experiment with state licensed brothels, London and Stadt Hamburg, failed in 1838–41.

In 1847, the first bureau for registration and regular weekly medical examinations of prostitutes were founded in Stockholm: in 1859, all prostitutes were forced to registration at such a bureau. This was not a national law: it was a question for the local city authorities, and after it was introduced in the capital, some Swedish cities, but not all, followed: the second was Gothenburg in 1865.

=== Foundation ===
Svenska Federationen was founded by A. Testuz, vicar of the French Reformed Church in Stockholm in February 1878. It was inspired by the British Ladies National Association for the Repeal of the Contagious Diseases Acts of Josephine Butler. It was organized in 1879 and formed its rules in Stockholm 24 November 1880. Members included Ellen Bergman, a key front figure of the organization,, Karolina Widerström, Sweden's first woman physician and chairperson of the National Association for Women's Suffrage and the German-Swedish activist Amélie Cederschiöld.

=== Purpose ===
Svenska Federationen deemed the regulation system as humiliating and socially stigmatizing: after being registered, the prostitutes were made to hand in their passport and exchange it for control books which were stamped after their weekly examination. This branded them as prostitutes which was at the time a social stigma, and prevented them from leaving town. They could only be removed from the registration bureau by a statement that they no longer engaged in prostitution, signed by an employer or a husband.

Svenska Federationen also opposed the justification of this regulation, which was the contemporary sexual double standards that branded men as incapable of sexual self-control and that prostitutes were therefore necessary to protect other women from rape, which resulted in the view that it was the prostitute women who was solely blamed for the spreading of sexual disease: the organisation wished to shift the blame from prostitutes to their male customers. This attempt to change contemporary sexual standard and opposition to double standards were conducted in parallel with the Sedlighetsdebatten.

=== Methods ===
Since its foundation in 1878, Svenska Federationen published its own paper, and worked actively on public opinion through meetings, debate and publications. It also founded a Sunday club, a fund, hostels, working homes and employment agencies to help women who engaged in prostitution or were about to become so. It attempted to organize in all of the Swedish cities were the regulation system was in practice, as well as in Denmark and Norway, but most of its activity was to remain restricted to the capital of Stockholm.

=== Results ===
The Svenska Federationen presented petitions to the governor of Stockholm in 1880 and 1902, and to the monarch in 1883. In 1903, a Motion (parliamentary procedure) was made in the Riksdag to investigate a method other than the reglementation of prostitutes to stop the spreading of Sexually transmitted infection. A government committee was formed, which presented their suggestion in 1910. The reglementation system was finally abolished in Sweden by the Lex Veneris Act of 1918. At the time of its abolition, the reglementation was already abolished in all cities where it had occurred except in the capital itself.

== See also ==
- Finska Federationen
- Foreningen imod Lovbeskyttelse for Usædelighed
- Nordic sexual morality debate
- Liga Portuguesa Abolicionista

== Sources ==
- Baldwin, Peter (1999). Contagion and the State in Europe, 1830-1930. Cambridge University Press. ISBN 978-1-139-42615-2.
- Blom, Ida (2006). "Fighting Venereal Diseases: Scandinavian Legislation c.1800 to c.1950". Medical History. 50 (2): 209–234. doi:10.1017/S0025727300009753. ISSN 2048-8343. PMC 1472108. PMID 16711298.
- Blom, Ida (2012). Medicine, Morality, and Political Culture: Legislation on Venereal Disease in Five Northern European Countries, C.1870-c.1995. Nordic Academic Press. ISBN 978-91-85509-73-7.
- Lundberg, Anna (2008). Läkarnas blanka vapen : svensk smittskyddslagstiftning i historiskt perspektiv (in Swedish). Nordic Academic Press. ISBN 9789185509089.
- Mansson, Sven-Axel (September 2017). "The History and Rationale of Swedish Prostitution Policies". Dignity: A Journal on Sexual Exploitation and Violence. 2 (4). doi:10.23860/dignity.2017.02.04.01.
- Svanström, Yvonne (2006). Offentliga kvinnor: prostitution i Sverige, 1812-1918 [Public Women: Prostitution in Sweden 1812–1918] (in Swedish). Ordfront.
- Svanström, Yvonne (2007). "Ellen Bergman och Federationen: Kvinnoemancipation och sedlighet 1880-1910". In Jansdotter, Anna; Svanström, Yvonne (eds.). Sedligt, renligt, lagligt: Prostitution i Norden 1880-1940 (in Swedish). Makadam förlag.
