= Deolinda Lopes Vieira =

Portuguese feminist and early-education campaigner

- Born: 8 July 1888; Beja, Portugal
- Died: 6 June 1993 (aged 104); Lisbon, Portugal
- Other names: Deolinda Lopes Vieira Quartin; Deolinda Quartin
- Occupation: Teacher
- Years active: 40
- Known for: Roles in the National Council of Portuguese Women; campaigning in support of improved educational facilities and approaches in Portugal

Deolinda Lopes Vieira (8 July 1888 – 6 June 1993) was a primary school teacher as well as an anarcho-syndicalist activist and a feminist, who played an important role in Portugal's Conselho Nacional das Mulheres Portuguesas (National Council of Portuguese Women - CNMP).

== Early life ==
Deolinda Lopes Vieira was born on 8 July 1888, in the city of Beja in the Alentejo region of Portugal. She was the daughter of Maria Claudina Lopes, an unmarried domestic servant, who came from Algarve, and José Gonçalves Vieira, a travelling salesman, who only formally acknowledged his paternity in 1894. After attending primary school in her hometown, she moved with her family to the capital of Lisbon at the age of 12. She completed her primary school course at the Escola Normal Primária de Lisboa, which at that time was a progressive institution that aimed to bring about pedagogical and social reforms.

== Activism and marriage ==
At a young age, Lopes Vieira began to get involved in various political and civil rights causes and became an enthusiastic member of the Republican Party, which aimed to overthrow the Portuguese monarchy. She also became a feminist and anarcho-syndicalist, participating in the academic strikes against the government in 1907. In 1910, she started working as a teacher at the Escola-Oficina Nº 1 in Lisbon. After the overthrow of the monarchy in 1910, and despite her humble origins, she quickly managed to insert herself into Portuguese intellectual circles. She met her husband António Pinto Quartint at the Second Portuguese Congress of Free thought. He was a Brazilian intellectual and activist of Portuguese origin. In 1913, she left for Brazil, accompanying her husband who had been expelled from Portugal due to his anarchist views. She remained there until 1915, when the family was allowed to return to Portugal.

== Teaching and the women's movement ==
After returning from Brazil, Lopes Vieira returned to work at Escola-Oficina Nº 1, which her children would attend. This school, with a libertarian and masonic approach, was closed after the 28 May 1926 coup d'état that installed the authoritarian Estado Novo government. This forced Lopes Vieira to transfer to a government school, where she remained until her retirement. In 1919 she also joined the Lisbon Normal School, obtaining a diploma in early childhood education. By this time the Republican government had begun to introduce pre-school education. In 1923, she became a freemason, joining a branch of the French Ordre maçonnique mixte international - le Droit humain, and became one of the founders of the Humanity Masonic Lodge in Lisbon in 1923. She also joined the Conselho Nacional das Mulheres Portuguesas (National Council of Portuguese Women - CNMP), remaining a member until its forced closure in 1947. Together with the council's president Adelaide Cabete, Maria O'Neill, Vitória Pais Freire de Andrade and Aurora Teixeira de Castro, among others, she was a member of the organizing committee of the 1st Feminist and Education Congress, held in Lisbon from 4 to 9 May 1924. She made a presentation at this congress dealing with issues related to teaching children with disabilities. The second Congress held four years later, discussed the topic of co-education at a time when the Estado Novo government was beginning to abolish co-education. In 1931 she represented the Council at the International Conference on Child Protection. She specialised in matters related to education in the Council. Lopes Vieira also actively participated in teacher unions, including the Association of Teachers of Portugal, and was the secretary of that association. She argued strongly that the government should open more schools as a means of addressing the high levels of illiteracy common in Portugal at the time, and that these should be schools for both sexes and all social classes.

Lopes Vieira wrote for several publications, starting in 1909 with Amanhã, an anarchist magazine co-published by her husband, of which only six issues were published. Later she contributed to Alma feminina, the official bulletin of the Conselho Nacional das Mulheres Portuguesas, which was published in 1946. She also wrote for education magazines, notably Educação Social, published by Adolfo Lima, and for the anarcho-syndicalist periodical A Batalha, which was published between 1919 and 1927.

Deolinda Lopes Vieira died on 6 June 1993 at the age of 104. She had two daughters and one son with António Pinto Quartin. A street is named after her in the Portuguese town of Seixal.
