= Finska Federationen =

- Suomen Siveellisyysseura
- Established: 1880
- Founder: Constance Ekelund
- Dissolved: 1907
- Type: Abolitionist organization
- Purpose: Repeal of the reglementation system for prostitution
- Headquarters: Helsinki, Finland
- Location: Finland
- Official language: Finnish

Finska Federationen (lit. 'Finnish Federation'; Finnish: Suomen Siveellisyysseura), was the Finnish equivalent of the British Ladies National Association for the Repeal of the Contagious Diseases Acts. It was established in 1880 with the purpose to repeal the so-called reglementation system, which required prostitute women to registration and regular medical examination to prevent sexually transmitted infections.

It was suggested by the doctor's wife Constance Ekelund (1850–1889), after she had visited Sweden and Copenhagen and witnessed the work of the Swedish Federation and the Foreningen imod Lovbeskyttelse for Usædelighed. The members where both men and women and protested against sexual double standards symbolised by the reglementation system.

The Association managed to have brothels banned in the capital of Helsinki in 1884, and two reforms in the regulation of the Venereal disease legislation in 1894 and 1896; when the control of Venereal disease was removed from the Police and transferred to the health care authorities in 1907, the Federation regarded their goal to have been achieved.

== See also ==
- Foreningen imod Lovbeskyttelse for Usædelighed
- Svenska Federationen
- Nordic sexual morality debate
- Liga Portuguesa Abolicionista
