= Foreningen imod Lovbeskyttelse for Usædelighed =

Foreningen imod Lovbeskyttelse for Usædelighed (Association against the legal protection of prostitution), was the Danish equivalent of the British Ladies National Association for the Repeal of the Contagious Diseases Acts. It was established in 1879 with the purpose to repeal the regulation system, which required prostitute women to registration and regular medical examination to prevent sexually transmitted infections.

The regulation system had been informally used by the Police in Copenhagen since 1815. When the system was given a permanent organization in 1863 and was finally formally legalized in law in 1874, it attracted attention and disgust around the sexual double standard illustrated by the regulation system.

The campaign was given a boost by the great scandal of 1895, when several police officers in the capital were exposed as having used sex workers by functioning as their pimps and clients.

After the ban on brothels in 1901 and the abolition of the regulation system in 1906, the association regarded their goal as having been achieved, and dissolved itself.

== See also ==
- Finska Federationen
- Svenska Federationen
- Nordic sexual morality debate
- Liga Portuguesa Abolicionista
