= Mathilda Malling =

Swedish novelist (1864–1942)

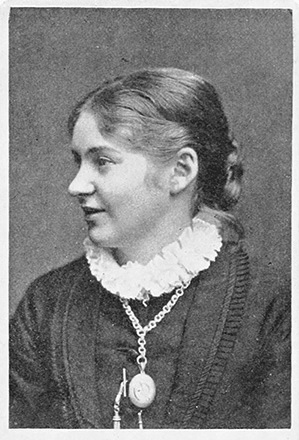
- Malling in 1902
- Born: Ingrid Mathilda Kruse Malling; 20 January 1864; Norra Mellby parish, Kristianstad County, Sweden
- Died: 21 March 1942 (aged 78); Copenhagen, Denmark
- Occupation: Novelist
- Spouse: Peter Malling (m. 1890)
- Writing career
- Pen name: Stella Kleve

Ingrid Mathilda Kruse Malling (20 January 1864 – 21 March 1942), better known by her early pen name Stella Kleve, was a Swedish novelist known for her portrayals of women's sensuality.

== Biography ==
=== Early life ===
Malling was born on her family's farm in North Mellby Parish, Kristianstad County, Sweden in 1864. Daughter of Danish estate owner Frans Oskar Kruse and Anna Maria Mathilda Borgström, she graduated from Lyceum for Girls in Stockholm in 1883, then studied at Lund University and in Switzerland in 1884, and in Copenhagen from 1885 to 1886.

=== Controversial early works ===
Malling debuted in 1885 with the novel Berta Funcke, followed in 1888 by the novel Alice Brandt, both published under the pseudonym Stella Kleve. In 1886, she published the novel Pyrrhussegrar (Pyrrhic Victories) in the progressive feminist publication Framåt ('Forward') by Alma Åkermark. Her contemporaries took note of her sensually colored depictions of young women, but posterity now considers her decadent late-naturalistic depiction of women as the female counterpart of the male breakthrough novels of this time. She had early contact with Ola Hansson who frequently corresponded with her and also courted and proposed to her. Hansson portrayed her, after a difficult break-up, in Tidens kvinnor as "Gallblomma". Emil Kléen and Albert Sahlin, young poets and students, wanted to include her in a Scanian "decadent calendar" in the late 1880s (which was never published), but failed to persuade her. Anti-Semitism and misogyny in the decadent literary style have been the source of much scholarship.

=== Fictionalized portrayal of Molly Brant ===
Malling's novel, Daybreak, published in 1906, depicts real characters and settings by name, thus promoting the vilification of an early American feminist leader of native people. Mary Brant and her culture might, while presented as fiction, be an attempt to degrade Brant, who was an influential Mohawk and the consort of Sir William Johnson.

Everyone in the Colonies knew of the great Sir William Johnson, whom King George II had knighted and made a baronet for his happy influence over the northern tribes of Indians. Relying on the 'Six Nations' and ruling the region around the Albany mountains as a sovereign, he had built on the Mohawk River his massive stone house, Johnson Hall, which was well fortified and almost resembled a European castle of the middle ages... Sir William's much talked-of mistress, the notorious Molly Brant... Poor Lady Johnson, who loathed and dreaded the 'housekeeper' worse than the plague... virtuous New York matrons bowing and cringing to the 'housekeeper' in the great drawing room...

— Mathilda Malling, Transatlantic Tales: Daybreak

A breakthrough female herself, perhaps insight into Malling's motivation, in scandalizing Brant through fiction, is somewhat explained in the University of Illinois's and Northwestern University's 1918 Scandinavian Studies and Notes: While "a popular writer of considerable talent... it is Mathilda Malling's pride to think that descendants of her own race did something to establish American freedom and they like so many others were resolved not to yield an inch from what they considered right."

=== Later works ===
After a long silence she resumed her writing, but in a very different character, with a novel about the First Consul, which was a huge success thanks to her skillful manipulation of historical material. Her work became hailed as well-done historically and even safe for family reading and included Madam Governor of Paris (1895, 2nd edition 1898), Eremitageidyllen (1896), Shooting on Munkeboda (1897), the play Lady Leonora (1897), Doña Ysabel (1898), Ladies in Markby (1901), Daybreak (1902), Nina (1903), Little Marica and Her Husband (1904), Lady Elizabeth Percy (1905), Her Hero (1906), Mary Stuart (1907), Nina's Honeymoon (1908), Karl Skytles Wife (1909), Sisters of Ribershus (1910) and The White House and Red House (1911). The later work shows lush, but little original, storytelling imagination and a lot of free floating. The historical novels found a large readership in the early 1900s, but her breakthrough novel Berta Funcke still arouses interest.

== European recognition ==
Malling's first two novels were heatedly discussed. Swedish feminist Ellen Key was famously connected with her.

== American recognition ==
Malling's first novel was cited by prominent American psychologist G. Stanley Hall, in his pioneering study of adolescence, as a parallel to the famously frank (and accusedly egotistic) authors Marie Bashkirtseff, Hilma Angered Strandberg, and Mary MacLane.

== Personal life ==
In 1890 she married merchant Peter Malling in Copenhagen. She died in Esajas sogn, Zealand, Copenhagen, Denmark, in 1942.

== See also ==
- Sedlighetsdebatten

== Bibliography ==
- An Encyclopedia of Continental Women Writers, Volume 2, Katharina M. Wilson (1991)
