= Lovisa von Plat =

Swedish brothel owner

Lovisa von Plat (died October 1785), also known under the names Platskan ('The Plat woman') and Moster von Platen ('Aunt von Platen') was a Swedish brothel owner and procurer, active in Stockholm for about forty years until her death. She belonged to the elite of her trade and became a known figure of her time, mentioned in memoirs, diaries and literature.

== Life ==
The activity of Lovisa von Plat is first documented in a well known court case of 1747, which centered around Helena Bohman, one of the prostitutes of von Plat's keeping.

The background and identity of von Plat is sketchy, and the information she gave in 1747 may not have been truthful. In the census of 1747, von Plat claimed to have been "thirty and more", and that she was the daughter of an officer by the name of von Plat. According to the city census, she was officially registered as poor. This was untrue, as she was listed as employing a maid, wearing a wig and powder and using Swedish snuff.

When she was first questioned in the court case of 1747, she stated that her name was Helena Fahlberg. Later in court, however, she claimed that she had given the name of Fahlberg only because that was the name of her mother's first husband, while she was the daughter of her mother's second marriage with the officer von Plat, so von Plat was her real name.

=== Court case of 1747 ===
In 1747, von Plat was pointed out as a procurer by the seventeen year old Bohman, the daughter of a wealthy craftsman who had run away from home and had been reported for prostitution. This court case was to attract great attention, last for months and involve numerous people.

Bohman claimed that von Plat had rented out her sexual services to various men from the upper classes and nobility, whom she met at von Plat's home, or at various places von Plat had escorted her to. von Plat was portrayed as a well-known elite procurer who provided prostitutes for upper class clients in Stockholm. When summoned, von Plat claimed to be a seamstress; she stated that she had tried to provide Bohman with work as a seamstress or a domestic, and that the men frequenting her home was merely her clients in her capacity as a seamstress. Several other witnesses gave damaging testimonies against von Plat.

When she was summoned before the court a next time, von Plat refused to attend court and left the city. She had taken refuge in an unidentified vicarage in the countryside. A Governor testified to her good character, and Baron von Kurck claimed that she and the prostitutes of her stable where all seamstresses and laundresses in his employ. During this epoch, unmarried women who could not prove that she had a legal profession, a fortune or a protector who could vouch for her, risked being placed at the Långholmens spinnhus, and elite prostitutes with contacts where normally protected against this by a wealthy clients who provided them with such an assurance.

On 2 October, the case was dismissed on a legal technicality; because neither Bohman nor von Plat was residing in the city district in which the court case was conducted, and thus were out of its jurisdiction. The case was thus discontinued without it having led to any verdict, and there are no documentation than either Bohman or von Plat where ever punished by a legal court for these offences. von Plat went free despite evidence being presented that she owned a brothel, and it is seen as likely that she was protected by influential clients.

=== Later life ===
von Plat was evidently protected against prosecution by her connections among the upper class clientele to whom she catered. In 1757, she married Carl Otto Kretzmer, a grenadier sergeant of the royal Livgardet.

From the 1760s, she owned and operated the brothel Platskans jungfrubur ('The Plat Woman's Maiden Cage'), which was situated at the "S:t Olof Röda tomt" near the Adolf Fredrik Church, and which was the perhaps most famous Stockholm brothel during the reign of Gustav III of Sweden, alongside her main rival, the Ahlströms jungfrubur ('The Ahlström Maiden cage') of the former sea captain Magnus Ahlström.

In official documents, her brothel business is not very visible. In the census of 1760, the house in which her brothel was situated is stated to be owned by the married military wife "Lowisa Kritzmer"; in 1770, the owner was named as the widow "Helena Lovisa Kritzmer", age 49; and in 1780 by "Lena Lisa Krusmer", age 52, which was clearly the same person as von Plat, with different spellings of her name, who obviously gave false information about her age. It appears that she officially categorized her brothel as a tavern. As was the case in 1747, von Plat does not appear to have had many prostitutes actually living in the brothel, but rather to have the names of prostitutes whom she arranged to meet clients in her house or in other places. In 1770, the people listed to live with her was her two daughters, "a pauper of ill health", the daughter of a pottery maker named Maja Lena Dahlberg, a soldier and two widows; and in 1780, the household consisted of herself and her two daughters as well as two other women.

Her death date has not been found in any public records. Bellman stated in his death poem over her that she died in October 1785. It is noted, however, that her name is still placed as the number one procurer of the capital in Petter Wessman's famous list of all procurers and prostitutes of Stockholm, Samling af wisor, poesier och artiga anecdoter, from 1786.

== Legacy ==
von Plat is referred to in many diaries, memoirs, letters and chronicles of the time, and was the subject of many so-called "Whore Poems" from 18th-century Stockholm.

Her brothel is portrayed in the famed erotic memoirs of Gustaf Hallenstierna, who named himself, Nils von Rosenstein and Carl Fredrik Fredenheim as her clients.

The poet Johan Henrik Kellgren claimed in a libellous 1778 poem that Sweden's bard, Carl Michael Bellman, had learnt to make love in the "Plat Woman's Maiden Cage".

She is portrayed several times in Bellman's songs, as were many other members of the contemporary criminal world of Stockholm. After her death, Bellman wrote a poem about her death, "Platskans överfart på Styx i Oktober 1785" ('The passing of The River Styx by the Plat Woman in October 1785'). She is also mentioned in Fredmans Testamente nr 149.

A silhouette image of von Plat is preserved in the Kungliga biblioteket.

== See also ==
- Sara Simonsdotter
- Anna Carlström
