= Regulation system =

Historical system of licensed prostitution

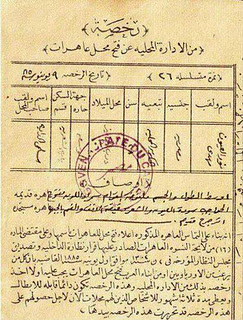
1885 prostitute license issued in the Cairo municipality

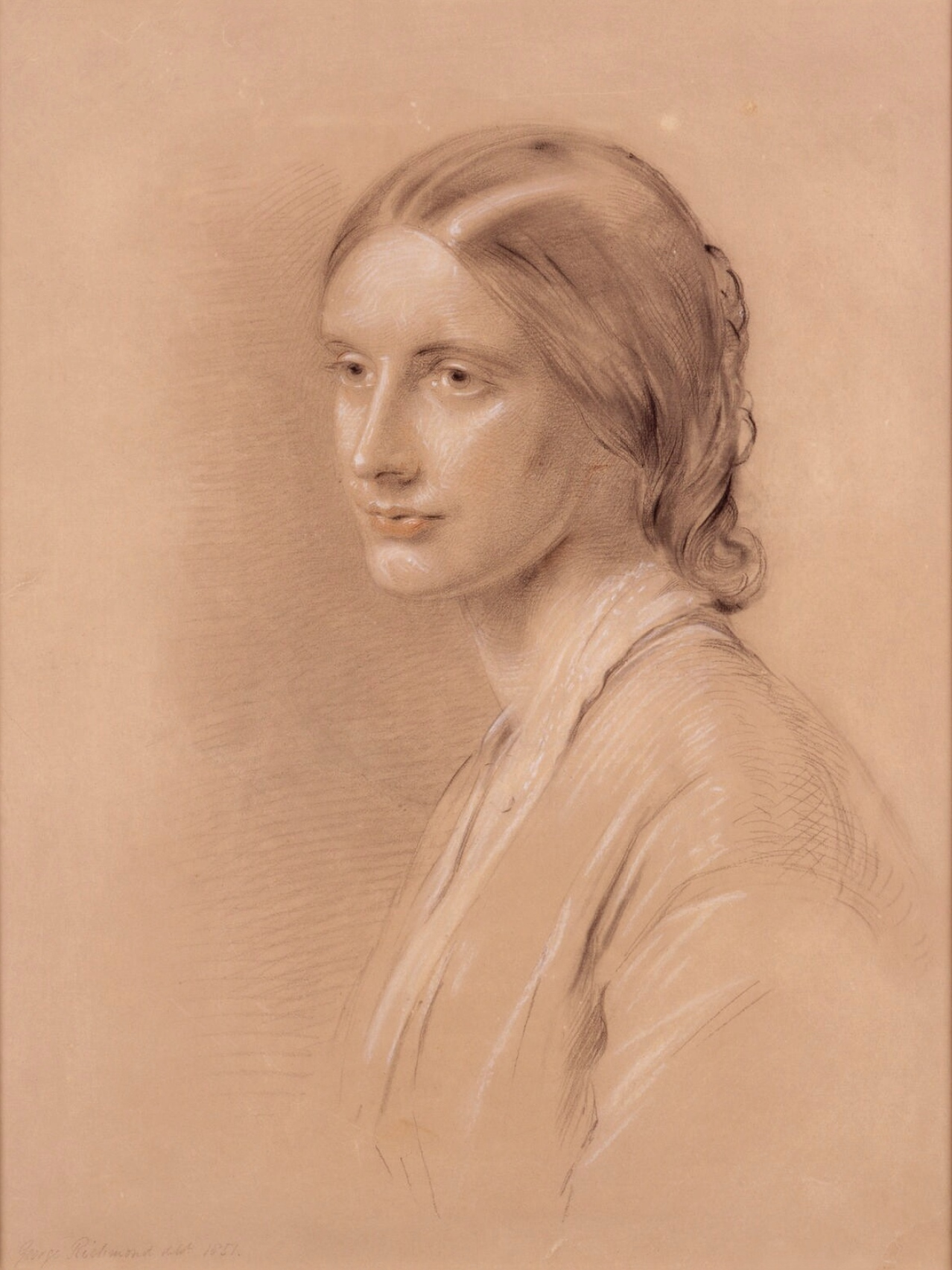
Josephine Butler in 1851, portrait by George Richmond. Josephine Butler was the founder of the international movement against the Regulation System.

The regulatory system or regulation system was an English language term for a specific type of control system for prostitution that was used in a number of European nations between the early 19th century and the first half of the 20th century, as well as in some countries outside of Europe. It has been referred to by several different names, such as regulationism, licensed prostitution and public prostitutiton.

The purpose of the system was to take control of prostitution and prevent the spread of sexually transmitted infection by the forced registration of prostitute women, who were allowed to sell sex in exchange for regular compulsory medical examinations for sexual diseases.

During the course of the 19th century, the system was introduced in a many parts of the Western world, such as France, the British Empire, the Russian Empire and the German Empire, but also in the Ottoman Empire. The system originated the First French Empire of Emperor Napoleon I, who introduced it in France and the countries occupied by France in the early 19th century. It was viewed as a role model for how to address prostitution, and introduced in many other countries during the course of the 19th century - either on national level, or in a more limited form by local city laws.

From the second half of the 19th century, the system attracted opposition from the women's movement and other activists. The system was targeted by national abolitionists organizations that collaborated in an international campaign, which was often coordinated with the campaign against the white slave trade (sex trafficking). The system was finally abolished during the first half of the 20th century.

== History ==
=== Background ===
The system originated the First French Empire during the reign of Emperor Napoleon I (r. 1799–1814). The purpose was to control the spread of sexually transmitted infection by taking control of prostitution. The system was introduced in several of the countries occupied by France during the Napoleonic era. The system was kept after the fall of Napoleon in 1815.

The system eventually came to be seen as a role model in many countries for how to address the problem of prostitution and sexually transmitted infection. During the course of the century, the system was introduced in many countries that had never been controlled by Napoleon.

In the 19th century, there was a common view on prostitution in the Western world as a "necessary evil". This view built upon the sexual double standards for men and women. Women were considered to have a limited to no sexual needs, and it was not seen as socially acceptable for a woman to have a sexual life outside of marriage. Some contemporary medical and psychological theories even defined women with a high sex drive as insane. By contrast, men were considered to have a high and strong sexual needs, and it was seen as unavoidable for men to seek sexual satisfaction, and useless to try to prevent them from doing so, regardless if they were married or not. Some contemporary medical and psychological theories even saw it as necessary for a man's health to have sex regularly.

=== The system ===
The contemporary sexual double standard resulted in prostituted women to be viewed as a "necessary evil" in order to protect other women from sexual harassment from men, since it was seen as impossible to prevent men from seeking sexual satisfaction. In parallel with prostitution being seen as necessary, it also caused great concern for public health, because of the spread of sexually transmitted infection. It was therefore seen as desirable for the authorities to control prostitution, which was otherwise assumed to take place in secrecy.

The "French system" was seen as a solution to this dilemma, and as a consequence, a system with registration and regular force examinations of prostitute women were introduced in a number of countries. There were some variation in the method, but the principles remained the same. Prostitute women were officially registered as prostitutes and forced to undergo regular medical examinations for sexual diseases: as long as the woman complied with the examinations, she was allowed to work, but failure to pass the test, or a refusal to report for an examination, could result in arrest and confinement to a lock hospital. If a registered woman could provide proof that she had acquired another way to support herself financially and was no longer a prostitute, she would be removed from the register. However, when a woman was registered as a prostitute, this was visible in her identification documents. This made it hard for her to get another job, which resulted in many women being unable to find other work and therefore becoming trapped in prostitution.

=== Abolitionist movement ===
From the second half of the 19th century however, the system attracted organized opposition. The movement working for the abolition of the regulation system became known as abolitionists. The opposition came from both the women's movement as well as from other contemporary social movements, such as the social purity movement and its eqvivalents in several different countries. Abolitionist organizations was formed in many countries, which also collaborated internationally.

The start of the organized opposition to the system originated in Britain. From 1869 the Ladies National Association for the Repeal of the Contagious Diseases Acts campaign against the System under the leadership of Josephine Butler. Butler did not restrict herself to Britain but made foreign tours to attracted attention to the issue in other countries. In 1875 the International Abolitionist Federation (IAF) was founded to coordinate an international campaign against the regulation system. This was followed by national organizations in many countries: some of them defined as affiliations or branches of the IAF, or independent organizations with the same goal. The so-called abolitionist movement campaigned against the Regulation System as well as against the white slave trade (the contemporary term of sex trafficking) and prostitution in general. In 1877 the International Abolitionist Federation organized the First International Abolitionist Congress in Geneva in Switzerland, with delegates from several countries.

The abolitionists viewed the control system as hypocritical, as it tolerated a prostitution that was officially condemned by society; and as a symbol of sexual double standards and a form of harassment of female sex workers, who were subjected to invasive forcible examination on threat of arrest, and targeted as the sole carriers of sexual infection, while their male clients were left out.

The system was finally abolished in most countries during the first half of the 20th century.

== By country ==
=== Algeria ===
After French colonization in 1830, the French authorities regulated prostitution to try to prevent the spread of STIs. The regulation system was based on the Ottoman regulations that were previously in place, and the Mezouar was retained, although he had to pay an annual fee of 2,046 francs. Compulsory medical examinations for prostitutes were introduced by decree in July 1830. The main articles of the decree read:

Prostitution in Algeria became illegal under Article 343 (Ordinance of 17 June 1975) of the Algerian Penal Code.

=== Australia ===
In the colonial period, prior to federation, three of the colonies of Australia adopted Contagious Diseases Acts similar to those of the United Kingdom between 1868 and 1879 (Queensland: Act for the Suppression of Contagious Diseases 1868; Victoria: Conservation of Public Health Act 1878; Tasmania: Contagious Diseases Act 1879 and Contagious Diseases Act 1881) in an attempt to control venereal disease in the military, requiring compulsory inspection of women suspected of prostitution, and could include incarceration in a lock hospital.

=== Austria ===
Since criminalization this did little to reduce prostitution, Austrian laws changed to consider prostitution as a necessary evil that had to be tolerated but regulated by the state. In 1850, Dr. Nusser of the Vienna police suggested that prostitutes be required to register with the police, receive medical examinations twice a week, and obtain special health certificates. In 1873, Anton Ritter von Le Monnier, head of the Vienna police, reformed Vienna's prostitution law, and health certificates have been obligatory since that time. Prostitutes who complied with the requirements of registration and examinations were no longer prosecuted by the police. A newspaper article of 27 October 1874 reported that 6,424 prostitutes had received health certificates and were under observation by police and health authorities. According to police estimates, at least 12,000 more women lived on the proceeds of "free love" without being registered. Most of these were factory workers who received so little pay that they needed the additional income. Of the registered prostitutes, 5,312 were unmarried, 902 widows, and 210 married. The youngest was 15 and the oldest 47 years old.

=== Belgium ===
The Regulation System was introduced in the area of what was to become Belgium during the French occupation (1794–1815). The "French System", as it was called, was kept when Belgium became an independent nation in 1830 and officially and legally recognized in 1844.

The System was managed by the city authorities and the prostitution police, who had the power of attorney to control the brothels and the sex workers, and to sentence and imprison women who did not comply with the regulations without interference from the justice system.

In the mid 19th century, the number of registered brothels diminished in Brussels. This concerned the authorities who saw the system as the only way to control prostitution. A reform of 1877 allowed for the registration of women under 21 in the brothels. This resulted in trafficking of under aged girls to the brothels in Brussels, and culminated in the infamous scandal known as the White Slave trade Affair in 1880–1881.

The Regulation System was abolished in Belgium in 1948.

=== Britain ===
The Regulation System was introduced on a local level by the introduction of the Contagious Diseases Act 1864. The Contagious Diseases Act 1864 mandated that women suspected of being prostitutes were to be officially registered as prostitutes and subjected to regular compulsory controls for sexual diseases.

Britain was the country of origin of the abolitionist movement against the Regulation System. From 1869 the Ladies National Association for the Repeal of the Contagious Diseases Acts campaign against the System under the leadership of Josephine Butler. The campaign was eventually to spread from Britain to other nations. The abolitionist movement was eventually to become successful.

The Regulation System was abolished in Britain when the Contagious Diseases Acts were repealed in 1886.

=== Bulgaria ===
Bulgaria became a principality in 1878. The regulation system, with registered prostitutes working in licensed brothels and tolerated as long as they subjected to regular examination for sexual diseases, regulated prostitution in Bulgaria for four decades until the 1920s.

The regulation system of tolerated prostitution attracted opposition and condemnation, and the licensed brothels were banned in the early 1920s.

=== Denmark ===
The regulation system had been informally used by the Police in Copenhagen since 1815. When the system was given a permanent organization in 1863 and was finally formally legalized in law in 1874, it attracted attention and disgust around the sexual double standard illustrated by the regulation system.

The Foreningen imod Lovbeskyttelse for Usædelighed was established in 1879 with the purpose to repeal the regulation system.

The campaign was given a boost by the great scandal of 1895, when several police officers in the capital were exposed as having used sex workers by functioning as their pimps and clients.

After the ban on brothels in 1901 and the abolition of the regulation system in 1906, the association regarded their goal as having been achieved, and dissolved itself.

=== Egypt ===
After the British occupation of 1882, the authorities were concerned about disease spreading amongst the troops. They made legal provisions to control prostitution and introduced a system of healthcare. In July 1885 Egypt's Ministry of the Interior introduced regulationism for the health inspection of prostitutes. Further regulations were introduced in 1896 to control brothels.

In 1932 a cabinet decree abolished licences for prostitution and established the "Public Morals Police". A new penal code was introduced in 1937 and included a section to punish men who lived off the earnings of prostitutes. In 1949 Military Order no. 76 was issued abolishing brothels.

=== Finland ===
The Regulation System was introduced in then Russian Finland when the Helsinki Police Station installed a Prostitution Control Bureau in 1847, where prostitute women were registered and controlled for sexual disease.

The System attracted opposition from social reformers. In 1880 the Finska Federationen was founded to campaign for the abolition of the system. When the system was reformed in 1894 and 1897, the reforms were substantial enough to be seen as a success by the abolitionists, although the system was not fully abolished.

In 1907 the system was abolished and the health care checks of prostitutes were transferred from the police to the normal health care services.

=== France ===
France was the country of origin of the Regulation System. In 1804 emperor Napoleon I legalized prostitution, provided that it was conducted under police control by women who registered in a state approved brothel (called "maisons de tolérance") and was regularly controlled for sexually transmitted diseases.

Only women over the age of 21, who were already confirmed to have been active in prostitution, were allowed to register at a brothel. The "French System" became a role model for other countries in the 19th century.

In 1879, the Association pour l'abolition de la prostitution réglementée (AFAPR) was founded to campaign for the abolition of the regulation system in France.

The Regulation System, as well as brothels and procuring, were abolished in France in 1946 after a successful campaign by Marthe Richard.

=== German Empire ===
Some parts of Germany were occupied by the French Empire of Napoleon in 1806–1815, and the Regulation System was present in some German states prior to unification. In 1839 the Regulation System was introduced to the Kingdom of Prussia.

The Regulation System was indirectly made a national law after the unification of Germany under the Kingdom of Prussia. The Criminal Code of 1871 prohibited brothels and "commercial fornication"; however, in the Criminal Code of 1876 prostitution was only punishable if the woman worked outside police supervision.

In 1899, the abolitionist movement was organized in Germany with the foundation of the German branch of the International Abolitionist Federation, the Deutscher Zweig IAF (DZIAF), under the leadership of Anna Pappritz and Katharina Scheven.

The Regulation System was abolished in Germany in 1927.

=== Greece ===
The Regulation System was introduced in Greece after the Greek War of Independence and the foundation of the Kingdom of Greece.

The System was informally practiced from 1834 onward, when prostitutes were allowed to work in special neighborhoods in some public localities such as hotels, in exchange for registration with the police and monthly heakth controls: it was formally introduced in 1856.

The diakanonistikon Regulation System was abolished in Greece in 1955.

=== India ===
In 1864 the British colonial authorities in British India introduced reglementation in British India via the law known as the Cantonment Act, 1864.

The law was introduced because of concern for the health of the soldiers of the British army stationed in India. Women from poor families were registered in military brothels reserved for the military were they were regularly controlled for sexual diseases, in order to protect British soldiers from sexually transmitted diseases. Many red light districts in India that still existed in the 21st century was founded and developed in this era, such as the big red light district in Mumbai known as Kamathipura.

India was not included when regulation was abolished in Britain after the campaign of the Ladies National Association for the Repeal of the Contagious Diseases Acts in 1886. The organization thereafter campaigned for the abolition of the regulation system also in India, and eventually achieved their goal in 1895.

=== Italy ===
The Regulation System was known in Italy as the Regolamentazione, and introduced after the unification of Italy in 1860 with France as a role model. The System gave strict rules were the registered brothels were allowed to be located and mandated them to always have their window shutters closed.

Josephine Butler visited Italy in 1874, Anna Maria Mozzoni founded and chaired a branch of the International Abolitionist Federation in Milano, and Alaide Gualberta Beccari raised the issue in her magazine La Donna in 1875.

The Regulation System was abolished in Italy via the Legge Merlin-law in 1958, which was initiated by the Socialist Party.

=== Japan ===
In 1872 the Proclamation for the Emancipation of Prostitutes and Geisha Act outlawed the enslavements of prostitutes and sex workers, allowed for those who had been prostituted against their will to end their sex work, and mandated that all prostitute women were obligated to obtain a license to work. In 1901 the Regulation for Control of Prostitutes formalized the regulation system of prostitution in Japan, and in the 1908 Ministry of Home Affairs Ordinance No.16, all unregistered prostitution was banned. The regulation system was used by the army, with military brothels staffed with Karayuki-san, a system which was later to be followed in the 1930s by the comfort women system of sexual slavery.

Opposition to the prostitution system and relief work for sex workers was organized around 1900 by Christian churches, Central Women's Relief Department of the Savation Army and the Japanese Women's Christian Temperance Union, and the Japanese Women's Association for Rectifying Public Morals (Fujin kyōfūkai Shanhai shibu) was founded which campaigned against licensed prostitution, with its Shanghai branch campaigning against the Karayuki-san-system in Shanghai.

After the war, pimping was prohibited in Japan in 1947, followed in 1957 with a ban against prostitution.

=== Lebanon ===
During the era of slavery in Ottoman Lebanon, prostitution was connected to slavery. The Islamic Law formally prohibited prostitution. However, since the principle of concubinage in Islam in Islamic Law allowed a man to have intercourse with his female slave, prostitution was practiced by a pimp selling his female slave on the slave market to a client, who was allowed to have intercourse with her as her new owner, and who after intercourse returned his ownership of her to her pimp on the pretext of discontent, which was a legal and accepted method for prostitution in the Islamic world.

In 1931, whilst the country was under French control, a new law regulated prostitution. Prostitutes needed to be registered and were only allowed to work in licensed brothels. To obtain a license, they had to be over 21, not be a virgin, and have undergone a medical examination. The law criminalized working anywhere else. It also criminalized anybody facilitating working outside license requirements.

At the start of the Lebanese Civil War in 1975, all of the licensed brothels were located near Martyrs' Square, in the Zeitoun district of downtown Beirut. All these brothels were destroyed during the fighting. No licenses have been issued since to prostitutes or brothels.

=== Libya ===
Historically, prostitution was connected to slavery in Libya. The Islamic Law formally prohibited prostitution. However, since the principle of concubinage in Islam in Islamic Law allowed a man to have sexual intercourse with his female slave, prostitution in the Islamic world was commonly practiced by a pimp selling his female slave on the slave market to a client, who was then allowed to have sex with her as her new owner; the client would then cancel his purchase and return the slave to her pimp on the pretext of discontent, which was a legal and accepted method for prostitution in the Islamic world.

During the Ottoman period, the authorities are known to have tolerated prostitution in the Libyan port cities; prostitutes are noted to have been destitute women, such as widows and women abandoned by their families for indiscretion, or European and Black African slave women.

During the Italian colonial rule, the Italians introduced the same form of regulated prostitution system in Tripolitania and Cirenaica which they used in their other colonies as well as in Italy itself, with licensed brothels staffed with registered prostitutes subjected to regular medical checks. Brothels and prostitution remained legal after the independence of Libya.

After the 1969 Libyan coup d'état, the new leader of the country, Muammar Gaddafi, ordered the closure of Libya's brothels. Four years later, in 1973, prostitution was outlawed.

=== Morocco ===
Historically, prostitution was connected to slavery in Morocco. The Islamic Law formally prohibited prostitution. However, since the principle of concubinage in Islam in Islamic Law allowed a man to have sexual intercourse with his female slave, prostitution in the Islamic world was commonly practiced by a pimp selling his female slave on the slave market to a client, who was then allowed to have sex with her as her new owner; the client would then cancel his purchase and return the slave to her pimp on the pretext of discontent, which was a legal and accepted method for prostitution in the Islamic world.

Many authors such as Christelle Taraud have attributed the increase in prostitution during the French colonial period to the abolition of slavery in Morocco. The colonial French authorities pursued an anti slavery policy, and between the second quarter of the 20th century and the 1950s, the slaves in Morocco where gradually manumitted. In this time period, most slaves in Morocco where female house slaves, who were commonly used as domestic servants and sexually exploited in accordance with concubinage in Islam, and many destitute former female slaves, are claimed to have turned to prostitution to survive after manumission.

During French colonial rule (1912–1956) the regulatory system of prostitution was introduced. The authorities were concerned about the spread of STIs, particularly syphilis, amongst the troops stationed in the colony. "Quartiers réservés" (red-light districts) were set up in several cities, where prostitution was permitted, notably in Bousbir in Casablanca.

Within these quartiers réservés, prostitutes had to be registered and have mandatory regular health checks. They had to carry their registration card with them at all times and travel outside the quarter was only allowed by permit. Outside these quarters, maisons de tolérance (brothels) were set up for the use of Europeans. The prostitutes in these maisons were subject to the same regulation. Some prostitutes worked outside the quartiers réservés. There was frequent police action against these clandestines and they were forced to take a medical test. Those, who were healthy received a warning. If they had a sexually transmitted infection, they were taken to a hospital. On release from the hospital, they were taken to the quartiers réservés. Women who received three warnings were forcibly taken to the quartiers réservés. Where troops were stationed away from the cities, bordels militaires de campagne (mobile brothels) were set up for the soldiers.

Prostitution was banned in Morocco in the 1970s.

=== The Netherlands ===
The Regulation System was introduced in The Netherlands during the French occupation of Napoleon in 1810. The System was organized in accordance with the "French model", with registered brothels and regular controls of its workers.

The System was opposed by the Dutch women's movement, who viewed it an illustration of sexual double standards and oppression of women, and in 1884, the abolition movement was founded in the form of Nederlandsche Vrouwenbond ter Verhooging van het Zedelijk Bewustzijn (NPV) under the leadership of Anna van Hogendorp and Mariane van Hogendorp.

The Regulation System, alongside brothels and procuring, was abolished in The Netherlands in 1911.

=== New Zealand ===
In the nineteenth century, prostitution was generally referred to as the "Social Evil". As with other British dependencies, New Zealand inherited both statute and case law from the United Kingdom, for instance the UK Vagrancy Act 1824 was in force until New Zealand passed its own Vagrant Act 1866.

These included reference to the common prostitute. New Zealand was also amongst those dependencies that followed the British authorities in passing a Contagious Diseases Act; New Zealand's Contagious Diseases Act 1869 was in force until repealed by the Contagious Diseases Act Repeal Act 1910.

The Women's Christian Temperance Union New Zealand continuously found for repeal of the Contagious Diseases Act 1869 and ramped up its petitions and public letters with data from convictions in courts to prove how the law protected male predators and kept girls and women of all classes vulnerable to assault. It was an oppressive act, based on the belief, expressed officially even in the 1922 report, that women represented vectors for the spread of venereal diseases. It was replaced by the Social Hygiene Act 1917, although these fears reappeared throughout the British Empire in both World Wars.

In the post-war period, the concern was more with "promiscuity", although prostitution was seen as an extreme form of this. The gendered rationale and practice of venereal disease policy formed a focus for early feminist activism.

=== Norway ===
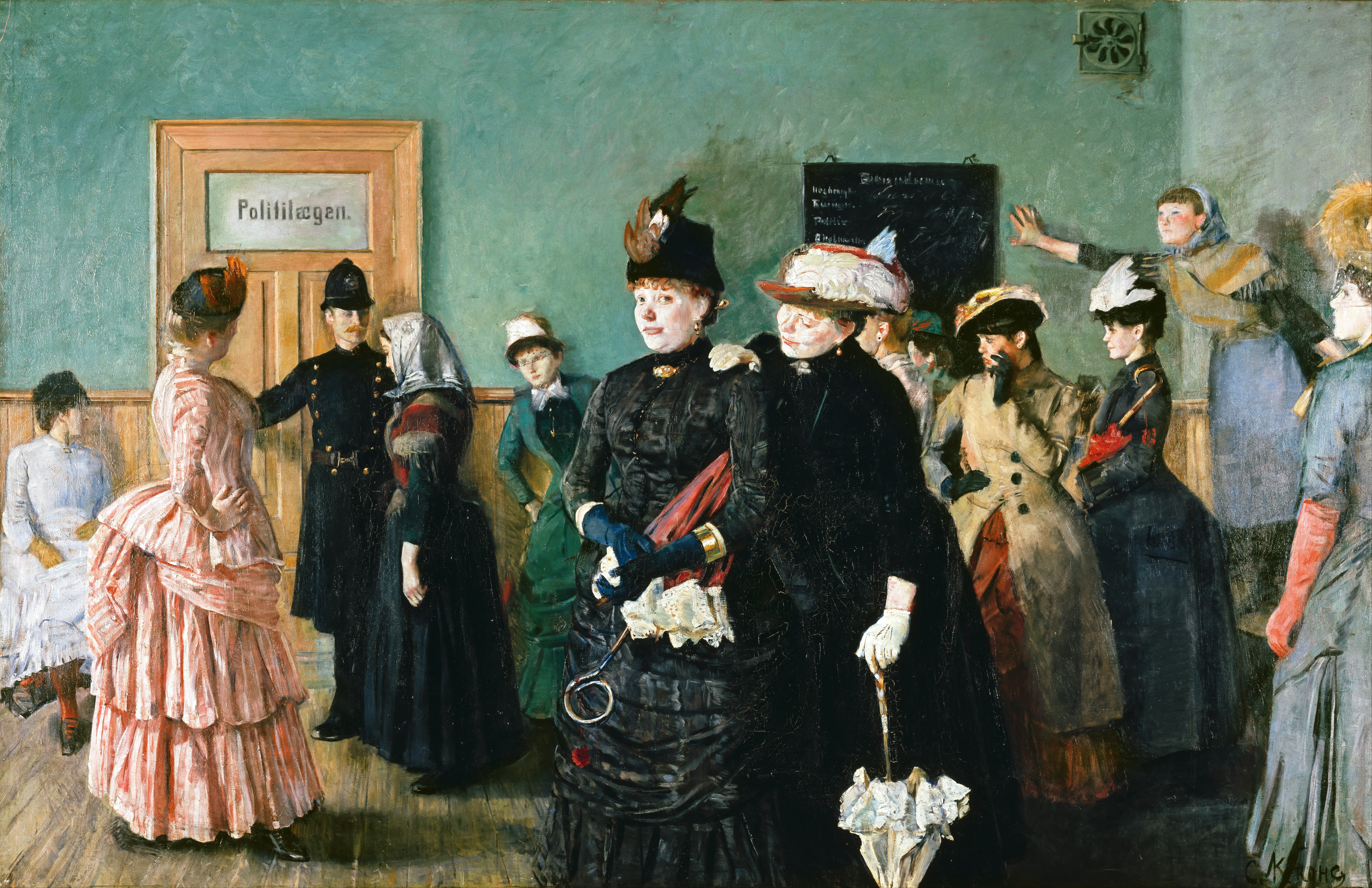
Albertine at the Police Doctor's Waiting Room, by Christian Krohg, 1886–1887 The Regulation System was introduced in Norway on the municipal level rather than on national level. The background was a new regulation in the public health care, Sunnhetsloven of 1860, that made it compulsory for the municipal authorities to prevent the spread of sexual disease. While this law did not in itself refer to prostitutes, it was used by the municipal authorities in the three biggest cities in Norway - Oslo, Bergen and Trondheim - to introduced the Regulation System, known as Prostitutionskontrollen ('Prostitution Control') in their jurisdiction.

In 1882 the Norwegian branch of the International Abolitionist Federation was founded under the name Kristiania Forening til Fræmme af Sædelighed; after the anti-prostitution novel Albertine was banned in 1886, the women's movement under Norsk kvinnesaksforening launched a campaign against the system which gained support by the some politicians from the Venstre, a campaign which was to become successful.

In 1888, the Municipal authorities of Oslo abolished the system by including the health checks of prostitutes in the general health checks for everyone. This was however only a local decision, since the system was regulated by municipal laws. The System lasted longest in the city of Bergen, where the municipal authorities did not abolish the system until 1909.

=== Ottoman Empire ===
During the era of slavery in the Ottoman Empire, prostitution was connected to slavery. Islamic Law formally prohibited prostitution as zina. However, since the legal principle of concubinage in Islam allowed a man to have intercourse with his female slave without it being defined as zina, prostitution was practiced by a pimp selling his female slave on the slave market to a client, who was allowed to have intercourse with her as her new owner, and who after intercourse returned his ownership of her to her pimp on the pretext of discontent, which was a legal and accepted method for prostitution in the Islamic world. The prostitution of female slaves was formally prohibited as a result of the issuing of a new code of law, the Kanunname of 1889. Former female slaves rarely had other options than to continue to work for their former enslavers. If they were fired, they were often forced to rely on prostitution to survive.

The growing number of prostitutes who were not slaves changed the system of prostitution. The Regulation System was introduced with the 1884 Ottoman Prostitution Regulation, when brothels were legalized on condition that they were registered and that their workers were registered and subjected to regular controls of sexual diseases.

=== Poland ===
During the period of Polish Partition (1795–1918) prostitution flourished openly, whereas previously (Polish-Lithuanian Commonwealth) (1648–1795) it had been confined to brothels and back streets near army garrisons. The official position of the occupying Russian authorities was that prostitution was a "necessary evil" (zło konieczne), and reflected the administration of prostitution in Russia. The administration was the responsibility of the police under the Ministry of the Interior. Local committees made of police and physicians administered the regulations.

Polish garrisons had their own brothels, and as Europe progressively adopted the Napoleonic system of regulation, state-regulated prostitution became established in 1802 (in Prussian and Russian Poland) and in 1859 in Austrian Galicia. In 1843 the Russian governor introduced a tax on brothels and prostitution, and 30 years later created the committees to oversee regulation. The regulations required all women in commercial sex to register and undergo regular gynecological examinations which were recorded in 'passports'. Despite this, there existed an illegal sector of women who chose not to become part of the public register.

As police regulated the zoning of brothels away from the public eye, professional prostitutes moved toward working as independents. The regulations were very detailed. The police allowed a premise to open if it was situated at least 315 metres from a church or school, while advertising was prohibited. Other regulations included forbidding a premise to operate under the guise of another institution, such as cafes and billiard room. Portraits of the Royal Family or other state symbols were forbidden, as was hanging out of windows incompletely dressed. Fees varied with the class of institution and proprietors kept three-quarters of the proceeds, for overheads. There was no charge for the treatment of syphilis. The public could inspect the medical records before selecting a worker – but she could refuse a client if he was drunk. Although there were penalties for overworking the women, they were obliged to service 10–12 clients a day. Similar regulations were in effect in the Prussian-occupied territories. The Austro-Hungarian Empire was less centrally controlled than that of Russia and Prussia. On the other hand, women could be transported anywhere in the empire. Under Empress Maria Theresa and the Constitutio criminalis Theresiana, things were less tolerant, and amongst other things the Morals Police were introduced, although ultimately all these measures proved futile.

In parallel, police closed many of the larger brothels due to public pressure. Police had the powers to forcibly register women they suspected, which could simply be women having relationships outside of marriage. A number of factors contributed to the growth of the sex trade in nineteenth-century Poland, including increasing urbanization, with growing cities and a population shift from the land to the towns and cities. The increasing feminization of poverty was also a contributing factor. So prevalent was paid sex amongst domestic servants, that a 1913 regulation required them to register for medical exams as well. A second class was waitresses, and after 1906, they too were registered.

A great deal of attention began to be paid to prostitution during this period. This increased attention needs to be interpreted in the light of nineteenth-century European attitudes to prostitution, where it was becoming the subject of almost daily discourse. The second wave of moral panic also swept Poland during the Second Republic (1918–1939). However what was often neglected was that Polish sex workers comprised a potentially upwardly mobile, economically ambitious lower class, that contributed significantly to Polish social and economic life.

Household servants, nursemaids, and wet nurses were among those known to rely on commercial sex to supplement their low wages, while middle-class husbands and their adolescent sons became regular clientele. Unsavoury images of prostitution, such as Jack the Ripper "Kuba rozpruwacz" were imported from abroad.

Physicians sounded the alarm about a rise in syphilis rates, while the Roman Catholic Church, middle-class charities, and Jewish aid agencies set up societies to rescue "fallen women" from the wages of sin. Chastity or "purity" societies, and women's groups organized meetings and conferences. Feminists composed moral treatises and established international organizations to combat the trafficking of women. "White slavery" attracted much media attention as in other countries. However, the bulk of the concern related to the open display of solicitation in public places. Public discourse emphasized not only this deviant behaviour but also the victim role, trapped and in the hands of pimps and traffickers. These stories were mingled with antisemitism, as the perpetrators (like infamous Zvi Migdal) were frequently depicted as Jewish. These scenes also appeared in the literature of the day, such as Bronislaw Szczygielski's A Woman - A Body: The Odyssey of a Fallen Woman (Kobieta-Cialo: Odyseja kobiety upadlej, Warsaw, 1914).

During the First World War, the establishment of brothels on the Russian Front was considered a major strategic initiative, despite protests from Empress Zyta. Naturally separate institutions were required for officers, non-commissioned officers, and privates.

The new Polish authorities were faced with a large number of problems arising from the recently ceased hostilities. One of the first acts of the newly reconstituted nation was the Basic Sanitation Law of July 1919 (Zasadnicza ustawa sanitarna). Under this law, brothels were suppressed on 6 September 1922, while setting up a system of supervision of independent workers. A maximum of two workers were allowed in any house.

=== Portugal ===
From 1853 onward, municipal laws introduced the system of regulatory prostitution, with medical controls of prostitutes to control the spread of venereal disease and restriction of the movement of sex workers to separate them from other women and keep prostitution out of public sight.

From the 1920s the right wing dictatorship officially condemned prostitution due to its religious ideology, but in practical policy considered it necessary in order to protect non-prostitute women from sexual abuse, and upheld a strict control system with registration of sex workers and brothels. When the Portuguese women's movement organized and made international contact in the early 20th century, the Liga Portuguesa Abolicionista was founded in collaboration of the International Abolitionist Federation to campaign for an abolition of the regulatory prostitution system grew. The reform law of 1949 was introduce to gradually abolish the regulatory system, since it introduced stricter regulation of brothels and banned the registration of any new sex workers, which would eventually end with a ban of prostitution in 1963.

=== Romania ===
Between 1862 and 1930, Romania practiced the "French system" of regulatonism, in which prostitution was tolerated provided that it was practiced in an authorized brothel, by prostitute women who were registered and regularly subjected to examinations for sexual diseases. Prior to the unification of Romania, this system had been introduced in the Principalities in the 1850s. In 1930 the licenzed brothels were abolished in a reform influenced by American policy, but prostitution itself was not abolished and prostitute women were allowed to practice prostitution in their own homes. In 1943, the regulation system was temporarily reintroduced during the war, and legalized brothels reinstated. The legalized brothelse were closed by the communist regime in the late 1940s, and prostitution itself became a criminal offense in 1957.

=== Russian Empire ===
The Regulation System was introduced in the Russian Empire on 6 October 1843, when a reform legalized prostitution provided that the prostitutes subjected to registration and regular controls for sexual diseases. The pass and identification of the registered prostitutes were replaced with a special identification card that identified them as prostitutes, known as the Yellow ticket.

The Regulation System was abolished when prostitution was banned in Russia after the Russian Revolution in 1917.

=== Spain ===
The regulation system was introduced in the reign of Isabel II (1843–1868), firstly in cities, the Disposiciones de Zaragoza (1845) and the Reglamento para la represión de los excesos de la prostitución en Madrid (1847), followed by the 1848 Penal Code.

The abolitionist debate reached Spain in 1877 and resulted in a debate among mainly men that ended in favor of the regulation system because of medical arguments. In 1883, a deputy from the International Abolitionist Federation visited Spain to encourage the foundation of a Spanish section, but an organized Spanish abolitionist movement did not form until the foundation of the Sociedad Espanola del Abolicionismo [Spanish Society of Abolitionism] in Madrid by the doctors Hernandez-Sapelayo and César Juarros in 1922. However, in Spain abolition of regulationism was foremost promoted by the leftist and socialist political parties.

During the Second Republic (1931–36), prostitution was prohibited in 1935. When the Dictatorship (1939–75) was established, this law was repealed (1941). Spain became officially abolitionist on 18 June 1962, when the 1949 United Nations (UN) Convention for the Suppression of the Traffic in Persons and of the Exploitation of the Prostitution of Others was ratified by Spain, and the Decree 168 of 24 January 1963 modified the Penal Code (Código Penal) according to the convention.

=== Sweden ===
The regulation system was introduced in Sweden in on a municipal level. In 1838, the municipal authorities of Stockholm attempted to control the spread of sexual diseases by copying the "French System", and issued permits to two brothels in the capital, London and Stadt Hamburg, who were allowed to operate on condition that its sex workers were to be subjected to regular health checks. The experiment was however met with great impopularity in Sweden, were brothels had never been common, and both brothels were attacked by protestors and closed down by 1841. Registered brothels were not to become a reality in Sweden, where prostitutes normally worked independently.

In 1847 the city of Stockholm mandated all women working as prostitutes to be subjected to regular health checks for sexual diseases, and in 1859 the regulation system was formally introduced in the city, mandating all prostitute women to be registered by the police, undergo regular health checks and be placed in a lock hospital if sick. This was not a national law but a city law, but other several other cities followed Stockholm, and Sweden's second city of Gothenburg introduced the regulation in 1865.

In 1878 the opposition to the system formed the Svenska Federationen, which campaigned for the abolition of the system. The abolitionists called the system abusive to women and an illustration of a hypocritical sexual double standard. The issue was also raised during the 1880s Sedlighetsdebatten, a social debate criticizing the sexual double standards of the time.

In 1903 a state committee was formed and tasked by the Parliament to investigate an alternative method to prevent sexual disease; in 1910, the committee presented their conclusion, and in 1918 the regulation system was finally abolished by the Lex Veneris law.

=== Switzerland ===
Prostitution in Switzerland was banned from the Protestant reformation in the 16th century until the Revue pénale suisse of 1889, when a regulation system of authorized brothels were formally tolerated in some of the cities, such as Bern, Zurich and Geneva, in order to prevent the spred of sexual diseases.

Switzerland was managed by local laws and the regulation system was used in specific cities for different time periods, several of which had introduced the system before it was recognized as a fact in 1889. The French regulation system of maisons de tolérance was introduced in Geneva in the early 19th century, in the 1840s in Zurich, and in 1873 in Lugano.

In the 1880s, the international campaign by Josephine Butler influenced a Swiss campaign by Christian moralists against the regulation system in the Swiss cities, and the system was abolished in Lugano in 1886, in Zurich in 1897 and in Lausanne in 1899; Bern followed in 1900. Between 1925 and 1942, prostitution was banned in Switzerland.

=== Syria ===
Under the French Mandate (1923−1946), there was a system of legal and regulated prostitution. At the beginning of the Mandate 742 prostitutes were registered, but it is thought the actual number was much higher.

=== Tunisia ===
Prostitution was also connected to slavery in Tunisia. The Islamic Law formally prohibited prostitution. However, since the principle of concubinage in Islam in Islamic Law allowed a man to have sexual intercourse with his female slave, prostitution in the Islamic world was commonly practiced by a pimp selling his female slave on the slave market to a client, who was then allowed to have sex with her as her new owner; the client would then cancel his purchase and return the slave to her pimp on the pretext of discontent, which was a legal and accepted method for prostitution in the Islamic world. Slavery was nominally abolished in 1846.

Due to the destitute state of former female slaves and the lack of professions for women in Tunisian society, many former female slaves turned to prostitution after manumission; and several decades later, many prostitutes were of slave descent. The majority of slaves being Black, Blackness came to be associated with hypersexuality and Black prostitutes in high demand.

Tunisia became a French protectorate in 1881. In 1883 the La Marsa Convention made French law applicable in Tunisia. At that time brothels and licensed prostitution were legal in France and therefore also in Tunisia. The first maison de tolérance (brothel) appeared in Tunis in 1882. In 1889, a regularity system was introduced, and biweekly medical examinations for prostitutes were made mandatory to try to stop the spread of syphilis.

In 1977, the Tunisian Ministry of the Interior amended the 1942 decree to reflect the social and legislative developments the country had undergone. The system is by 2025 still used in Tunisia.

=== Vietnam ===
During the colonial period, female prostitution and other forms of sex work were not banned but instead heavily regulated by French authorities. The regulations focused heavily on encounters between the colonizing and the colonized (i.e., European men and Vietnamese women), leaving other kinds of sexual encounters and other forms of sex work, including ones involving native men or European women, unregulated. Even then, there was plenty of clandestine or "black market" sex work that took place outside of the regulation system in the colonial period. This situation is akin to that of the pre-colonial period, when sex work was regulated, albeit more loosely, and clandestine sex work also took place outside of the Đại Việt regulation system.
