= Sara Simonsdotter =

Swedish brothel owner

Sara Simonsdotter, called Tjocka Sara (Fat Sara) (floruit 1619), was a Swedish brothel owner and procurer in 17th-century Stockholm. Her brothel had clientele among the royal court and became the centre of a scandal when it was revealed in 1618.

On 4 November 1618, a married woman, Margareta Henriksdotter, was arrested in Stockholm for prostitution. Among her clients were people in high positions, such as Adam Richard de la Chapelle, a captain in the royal guard. Her arrest led to the discovery of a brothel at the ill-reputed street Kindstugatan, as well as the arrest of Simonsdotter and her employees.

The brothel, which also functioned as a place to sell stolen goods, was managed by Sara Simonsdotter, while the town executioner, Master Håkan, acted as a pimp. Her prostitutes worked at the brothel but also visited clients in their homes and at other locations. Among her employees were several women who were not career prostitutes but rather married women who earned money without the knowledge of their spouses. The mistress of John, Duke of Östergötland was also seen there, though it was unknown in what capacity. The clients were often deprived of their clothing to prevent them from leaving before payment. Among the clients of her brothel were the Dutch ambassador and a courtier. While in prison, several of the women escaped in a prison break with a group of male prisoners, assisted by three soldiers, who helped them dig a tunnel under the wall.

Several of the former prostitutes seem to have been banished from town, a sentence carried out by Master Håkan, who does not seem to have been punished for his part in the affair. The clients were all fined, with a higher fine for the married clients than for the unmarried. Sara Simsondotter herself was sentenced to time in the pillory and to be whipped, a sentence which was carried out on 19 May 1619. She was afterward deported to her home parish Kimito in Finland, with the warning that she was to be executed if she ever returned.

== See also ==
- Anna Carlström
- Lovisa von Plat
