= Ladies National Association for the Repeal of the Contagious Diseases Acts =

The Ladies National Association for the Repeal of the Contagious Diseases Acts (often simply the Ladies National Association or the LNA) was established in 1869 by Elizabeth Wolstenholme and Josephine Butler in response to the Contagious Diseases Act 1864 that had been passed by the British Parliament. The act legalised prostitution and put the women involved under police and medical control. Not only was "sin" made official but poor women were badly treated. No other campaign groups dealing with the repeal of the Contagious Diseases Acts were as successful or held as much significance for women as the Ladies National Association. However, the LNA was not only concerned with the CD Acts; they were involved in other important social and political issues as well. They had the unanimous support of a royal commission in 1871, and by years of lobbying convinced Parliament to suspend the acts in 1883 and repeal them in 1886, thus ending legalised prostitution.

== Background ==
Parliament in the 1860s in the Contagious Diseases Acts ("CD") adopted the French system of licensed prostitution. The "regulationist policy" was to isolate, segregate, and control prostitution. The main goal was to protect working men, soldiers and sailors near ports and army bases from catching sexually transmitted infections, then known as venereal disease. The Ladies National Association was established in 1869 in response to the Contagious Diseases Act. Mary Priestman was the secretary and her sister Margaret Tanner was the secretary.

Women were not allowed to join the original official repeal group, the National Association for the Repeal of the Contagious Diseases Act. By 1871 the LNA had fifty-seven branches and 811 subscribing members, and as part of their effort for the campaign had published more than 520 pamphlets regarding the issue. A sympathetic MP commented to Butler:

Your manifesto has shaken us very badly in the House of Commons: a leading man in the House remarked to me, "We know how to manage any other opposition in the House or in the country, but this is very awkward for us, this revolt of women".

This comment illustrates how unique the movement was for the time. The Ladies National Association was the first politically focused campaign to be organised and led entirely by women, and in that way its members were pioneers for the rights of women. They were also one of the first such movements to be successful: the Contagious Diseases Acts were repealed in 1886.

== Repeal of the Contagious Diseases Acts ==
The Contagious Diseases Prevention Act 1864 was a law passed by Parliament in 1864. It was replaced by Acts of 1866 and 1869 giving even more powers to the police, and covering additional districts. It caused demand not only for extension of the acts to the rest of the country, but also for the repeal of the acts. LNA defended prostitutes, saying that they were the victims of social injustice, not criminal miscreants.

On 1 January 1870 the LNA published an article named "Women's Protest" in the Daily News; this article gave a detailed explanation of what exactly the Ladies National Association felt was unjust and unlawful about these acts:

2nd – because as far as women are concerned, they remove every guarantee of personal security which the law has established and held sacred, and put their reputation, their freedom, and their persons absolutely in the power of the police

4th – Because it is unjust to punish the sex who are the victims of a vice, and leave unpunished the sex who are the main cause, both of the vice and its dreaded consequences; and we consider that liability to arrest, forced medical treatment, and (where this is resisted) imprisonment with hard labour, to which these acts subject women, are the punishment of the most degrading kind.

Many influential women of the time associated themselves with this article, such as Florence Nightingale, Harriet Martineau, Mary Carpenter and many figures known in the literary and philosophical world. This article printed in the Daily News points out exactly what angered the LNA: the double standards of men, the fact that only women (even though men were also responsible for the spread of venereal disease) were subjected to humiliating medical examinations, that if they were found to be infected they would be contained in lock hospitals for treatment, and that if women refused to comply with the police they could face imprisonment regardless of any possible financial, economic, social and emotional impact on the woman or her family.

Butler toured Britain in 1870, travelling 3,700 miles to attend 99 meetings in the course of the year. She focused her attention on working-class family men, the majority of whom were outraged at the description Butler gave of the examination women were forced to undergo; she called the process surgical or steel rape.

The LNA faced confrontation not only from their rival group the Association for Promoting the Extension of the Contagious Diseases Acts who were campaigning for the extension of the contagious diseases acts, but by society in general. Many people were appalled by her frank manner in describing sexual matters and police brutality; it drew a lot of negative attention from newspaper editors and columnists, many of whom felt it was inappropriate for a woman to behave in such manner. An example of the condemnation can be seen by an article written by Dr. Preston on 24 June:

I will pass over to Mrs. Josephine Butler’s address in public before men. . . because I believe that a very large majority of our sex. . . can only characterize it as the height of indecency to say the least. But it is my opinion that women are ignorant of the subject – but not Mrs. Josephine Butler and company – they know nothing about it. . . certainly if such women as Mrs. Butler continue to go about addressing public meetings – they may ultimately do so but as present I venture to say that they are ignorant and long may they remain so. I don’t like to see women discuss the matter at all. No men, whoever they may be, admire women who openly show that they know as much on disgusting subjects as they do themselves, much less so those who are so indelicate to discuss them in public.

However, her actions made her a heroine among other writers, particularly suffragist pamphleteers who admired her work and continuous effort for the repeal of the acts.

== International Efforts ==
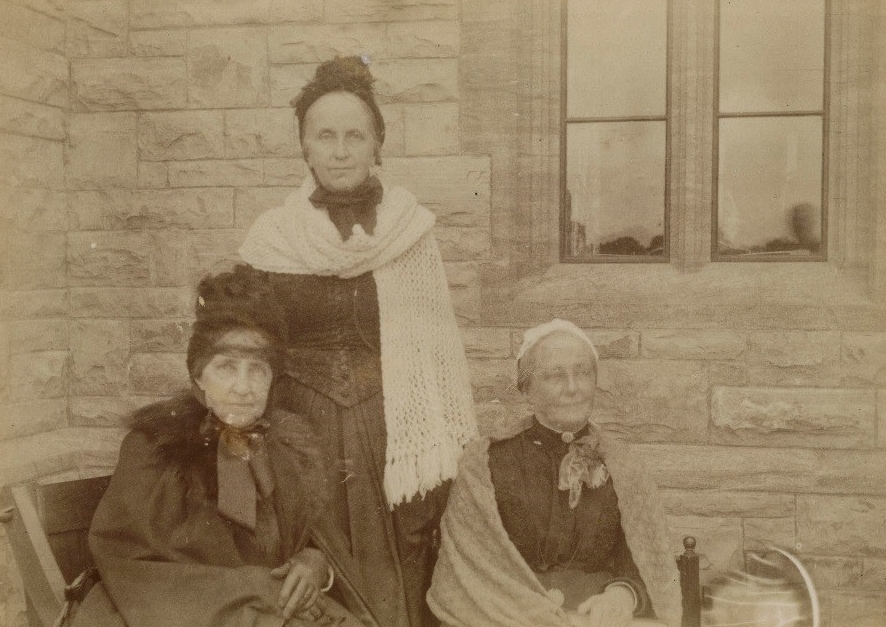
LNA activists: Anna Maria, Margaret Tanner (Treasurer) and Mary Priestman (secretary)

Butler and the rest of the Ladies National Association not only concentrated their efforts within Britain. There was similar legislation in various European countries, where the Regulation System was present in many countries, and similar provisions were enacted in India under the British Raj in 1897. The LNA took these legislations just as seriously as the acts in Britain and actively started campaigning for their repeal as well. Butler spent many years traveling between countries trying to rally support for her cause as well as holding numerous meetings in Britain.

In the 1880s, the LNA was involved in the White slave trade affair, combatting the sex trafficking of girls to the Brussels brothels, and Mary Steward of the LNA accompanied the abolitionist Quaker Alfred Dyer and Quaker George Gillet and to Brussels to investigate, assisted by the Belgian priest Leonard Anet and the Belgian lawyer Alexis Splingard, contributing to exposing the affair.

In May 1886, Butler wrote to the Priestman sisters about turning the LNA into an organisation for the colonies because the Contagious Diseases Acts were still in effect there, though they had been repealed at home. In May 1887 Butler told Sentinel readers that

our poor Indian sisters claim our sympathy even more than our own country women who were subjected to the C.D. Acts, for not only are they women oppressed by men, but they are the women of a conquered race oppressed by their conquerors. Their hope of deliverance must seem to them so very far off."

== Other Campaigns ==
Not only did the LNA concern themselves with the Contagious Diseases Acts, they also contributed to other women's rights campaigns of the time. For example, the LNA and some of its individual members were involved throughout the suffrage movement and their campaign for the women's vote.

== See also ==
- Swedish Federation
- Finska Federationen
- Foreningen imod Lovbeskyttelse for Usædelighed
- Liga Portuguesa Abolicionista

== Bibliography ==
- Burton, Antoinette M. (1994). Burdens of history: British feminists, Indian women, and imperial culture, 1865-1915. University of North Carolina. ISBN 9780807821619.
- Butler, Josephine Elizabeth Grey (1896). Personal Reminiscences of a Great Crusade. London: Horace Marshall & Son. ISBN 9781297401725.
- Mathers, Helen (2014). Patron Saint of Prostitutes: Josephine Butler and the Victorian Sex Scandal. Stroud, Gloucestershire: The History Press. ISBN 978-0-7524-9209-4.
- Sigsworth, E. M.; Wyke, T.J (2013). "A Study of Victorian Prostitution and Venereal Disease". In Vicinus, Martha (ed.). Suffer and Be Still Women in the Victorian Age. Routledge. ISBN 9780415836470.
- Walkowitz, Judith R. (1982). Prostitution and Victorian Society: Women, Class, and the State. Cambridge University Press. ISBN 9780521270649.
- Walkowitz, Judith R. (1992). City of Dreadful Delight: Narratives of Sexual Danger in Late-Victorian London. Virago Press. ISBN 9781853815171.
- Williamson, Joseph (1977). Josephine Butler: The Forgotten Saint. Leighton Buzzard: Faith Press. ISBN 978-0-7164-0485-9.
