= Vitória Pais Freire de Andrade =

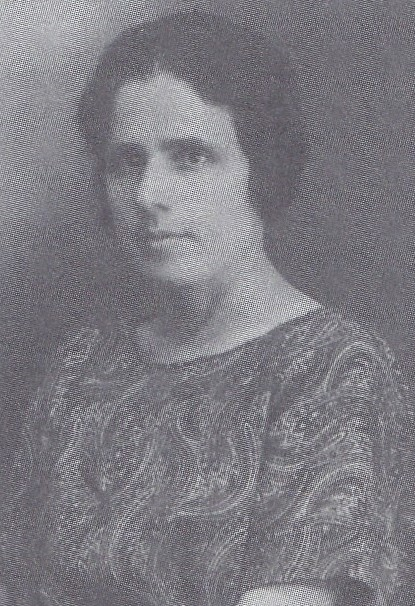
- Born: 1883; Ponte de Sor, Portugal
- Died: 1930 (aged 46–47); Lisbon, Portugal
- Other names: Vitória Pais Freire de Andrade Madeira; Vitória Pais
- Occupation: Teacher
- Years active: 20
- Known for: Roles in the National Council of Portuguese Women; campaigning against bullfighting
- Notable work: A acção dissolvente das touradas

Vitória Pais Freire de Andrade (1883 – 1930) was an active Portuguese feminist who played an important role in the Conselho Nacional das Mulheres Portuguesas (National Council of Portuguese Women - CNMP) in the 1920s. She is also known for her campaigning against bullfighting in Portugal.

== Early life ==
Vitória Pais Freire de Andrade Madeira was born on 20 January 1883, in Ponte de Sor in the Portalegre District of Portugal. She was the daughter of José Albertino Freire de Andrade, a primary school teacher, and of Arsenia Maria Mineira. In 1903, at the age of 20 and already married, to Manuel Joaquim Madeira, a trader from Portalegre, she entered the Normal School of Portalegre, having already started teaching in several primary schools near her home.

== Feminism ==
At an early age, Freire de Andrade, who rarely used her husband's surname and was often called simply, Vitória Pais, began to demonstrate support for feminist causes, joining the Liga das Mulheres Republicanas (Republican League of Portuguese Women - LRMP), where she collaborated on the publication of the Liga's magazine, A Mulher e a Criança (The Mother and Child), which was published from April 1909 to May 1911 and later on the newspaper, A Madrugada (The Dawn), which was published by the Liga between 1911 and 1918. In 1912, she was also actively involved in a campaign to forbid the sale of tobacco and alcohol to minors. During the same period, she joined the Association of Teachers of Portugal and helped to encourage other teachers to join. She was also a member of the Association of Feminist Propaganda (APF), and responsible for publishing its newspaper, A Semeadora, from 1915.

Like many other activists, Freire de Andrade became a Freemason, in 1916. During World War I, she moved with her husband to the Portuguese capital of Lisbon, where she enrolled in the Nursing Course organized by the Portuguese Women's Crusade (CMP), with training by Sofia Quintino. After passing the exam, she provided help to wounded soldiers who had returned to Lisbon. In the early 1920s, she joined the Conselho Nacional das Mulheres Portuguesas (National Council of Portuguese Women - CNMP). She campaigned against prostitution and for the upgrading of education available to girls. She was President of the General Assembly of the Council in 1923 and 1925 and the council's Treasurer in 1926, as well as playing an active role in several of the commissions (working groups) set up by the council. She was on the organizing committee of the CNMP's First Feminist and Education Congress, which was held in 1924 to celebrate its tenth anniversary, and made a presentation to the Congress on the "Influence of public spectacles in education".

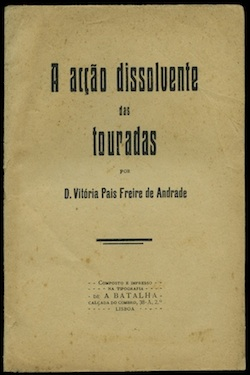
Publication against bullfighting

== Opposition to bullfighting ==
Focusing not only on feminism, Freire de Andrade also fought in defence of animals, advocating the ending of bullfighting in Portugal, publishing a paper entitled A acção dissolvente das touradas (Action to end bullfights) in 1925, where she showed special concern about the exposure of children to the violence of bullfights. She also joined, in the 1920s, the editorial board of the magazine Educação Social. During that same period, she attended some courses at the Faculty of Arts of the University of Lisbon, and enrolled at the Lisbon Normal School, where she became president of the Students’ Association. She represented the CNMP on the organizing committee for the Semana da Criança (Children's Week), first organized in May 1925 by the Teachers'’ Association.

Freire de Andrade died on 7 December 1930, at her home in Lisbon. In an obituary, Deolinda Lopes Vieira recalled that she had been an "enthusiastic advocate for a modern, scientific and dogma-free education", having a "lucid spirit and open to all ideas of progress and freedom."
