= Sven Adolf Hedlund =

Swedish newspaper publisher and politician

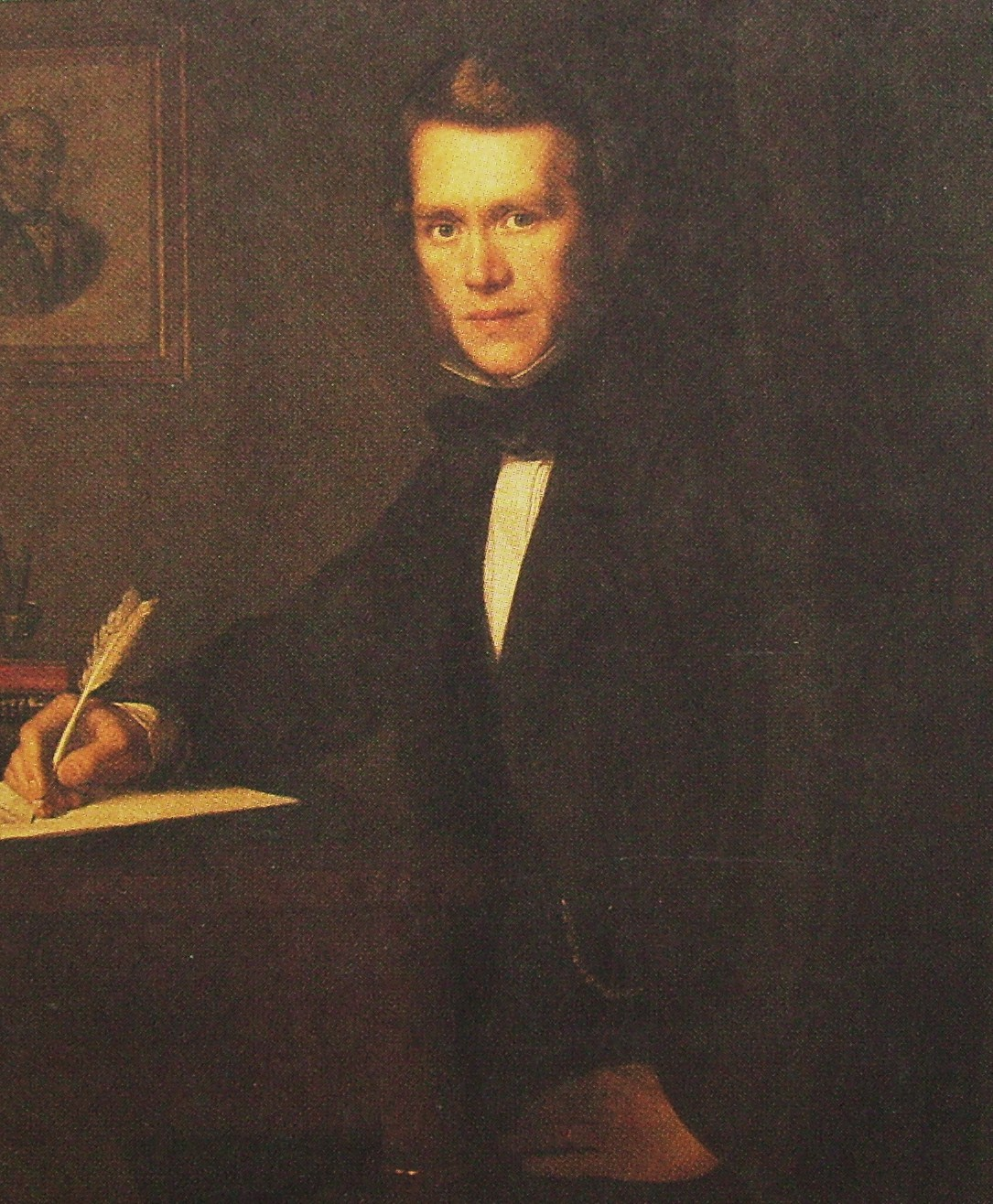
Sven Adolf Hedlund

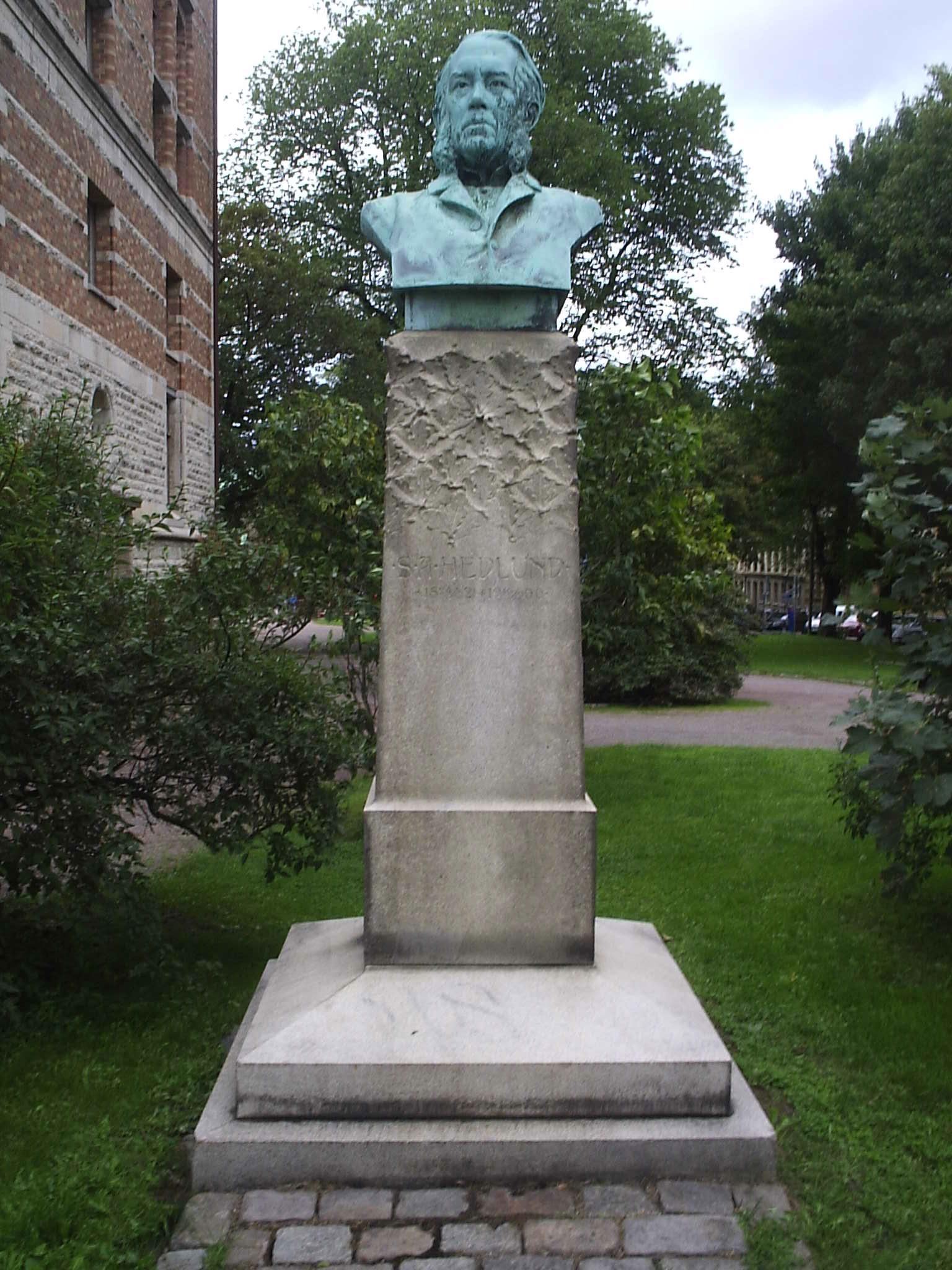
Bust of Sven Adolf Hedlund University of Gothenburg Library

Sven Adolf Hedlund (24 February 1821 – 16 September 1900), also known as S. A. Hedlund, was a Swedish newspaper publisher and politician. He was editor-in-chief of Göteborgs Handels- och sjöfartstidning and served as a Member of the Parliament of Sweden.

== Biography ==
Sven Adolf Hedlund was born on the island of Eldgarn, now in Ekerö Municipality at Mälaren, Stockholm County, Sweden, He was the son of the farmer Carl Adolf Hedlund and his wife Regina (née Björner). He earned a Bachelor of Arts degree in 1845 from Uppsala University.

In 1847 he was employed at the Swedish Ministry of Education and at the Swedish National Library in Stockholm. In the same year he also became a contributor for the publications Hermoder and Dagligt Allehanda. In 1849 he became managing editor of Örebro Tidning. In 1851 he joined the editorial staff of Aftonbladet. In 1852 he became managing editor of Göteborgs Handels- och Sjöfartstidning, a position he held for the rest of his life. As managing editor of one of leading Swedish newspapers, he became a major figure in the Swedish press.

Hedlund was elected as a Member of Parliament, representing Gothenburg Municipality in the lower house from 1867 to 1869 and from 1879 to 1883. He later represented Gothenburg and Bohus County in the upper house from 1875 to 1876, and Kristianstad County from 1886 to 1889.

During his first period in the parliament Hedlund opposed the agrarian Lantmanna Party, which put him in opposition to the liberal government of Prime Minister Louis De Geer. Although he later decided to side with the party he never became a devoted party member. Both as a publisher and politician, Hedlund was a prominent proponent of liberal reforms. He was a strong proponent of political liberties such as freedom of speech, freedom of religion and free trade. He also supported the Swedish representative reform of 1866, in which the old Estates Assembly was replaced with a bicameral parliament.

Hedlund was also active as a local politician and served in the Gothenburg Municipal Council for over thirty years. As such he contributed to the reforms and establishment of many local institutions, particularly in the educational system. He was a force behind the founding of Gothenburg Museum in 1861 and a proponent behind the establishment of the University of Gothenburg (Göteborgs högskola) in 1887.

== Personal life ==
Hedlund became engaged to Christina Maria Rudenschöld (1832-1905) and married her in 1854. They were the parents of five children. In 1860, Hedlund became a member of the Royal Society of Sciences and Letters in Gothenburg.

After suffering apoplectic stroke in 1889, Hedlund retired from his publishing works and public duties. He died in his home in Gothenburg in 1900. His funerary urn is located in the Viktor Rydberg Mausoleum at Östra kyrkogården in Gothenburg.
