= Nordic sexual morality debate =

Debate about sexual morality in the 1880s

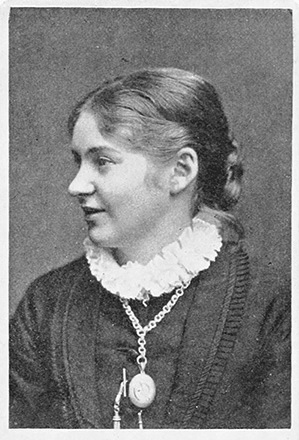
Mathilda Malling, known as Stella Kleve, in 1902. Her book Pyrhussegrar critiqued the sexual double standard.

The Nordic sexual morality debate (Danish: sædelighedsfejden, Swedish: sedlighetsdebatten, Norwegian: sedelighetsdebatten, literally morality feud) was the name for a cultural movement and public debate in Scandinavia taking place in the 1880s, in which sexuality and sexual morals, particularly the contemporary sexual double standard, were discussed in newspapers, magazines, books and theatrical plays.

== Background topic of the debate ==
The topic was criticism of the contemporary sexual double standards prevalent in the 19th century, in which it was socially acceptable for men to have premarital sexual experience, while women were expected to be virgins. Connected to this was the contemporary view on prostitution, which was sanctioned as a "necessary evil" because of this double standard, since men were expected to have sexual experience prior to marriage, in parallel to the fact that extramarital sex was socially banned for unmarried women. This was an issue that was raised by anti-prostitution organizations, such as the Svenska Federationen in Sweden, Finska Federationen in Finland, and Foreningen imod Lovbeskyttelse for Usædelighed in Denmark. These organizations all opposed the Regulation system, that allowed for prostitution in exchange for registration and forced health checks for female prostitutes, but not their male clients. This system was seen as a illustration of sexual double standard.

== Views ==
The debate was divided into two sides:

=== Moderate view ===
The moderate side, of which Bjørnstjerne Bjørnson was the most known representative, wished to solve this double standard by demanding that men also be virgins on their wedding night, just as women were. He believed that free love did not allow for the development of positive traits such as self-restraint and a focus on virtue. This was the more accepted view.

=== Radical view ===
The more radical side, of which Edvard Brandes and Georg Brandes were the most known representatives, demanded that women be free to enjoy a sexual life prior to marriage, as men were. This was a very controversial view in the 19th century.

== Cultural works associated with the 1880s debate ==
Getting Married by August Strindberg and the legal court case that surrounded it was one of the perhaps most known incidents during the debate.

It also caused a debate within the literary world as to whether literature should address these questions at all. Other well-known works in the debate are Henrik Ibsen's play A Doll's House (Et Dukkehjem), the novel Money (Pengar) by Viktoria Benedictsson, and the novel Pyrhussegrar by Stella Kleve.

== See also ==
- Modern Breakthrough
- Sexual liberation

== Sources ==
- Franka Gebert, Den stora nordiska sedlighetsdebatten, Riksteatern, 2008. PDF.
- Nationalencyklopedin: "Sedlighetsdebatten" (subscription required)
