= Hurum (surname) =

Hurum is a surname. Notable people with the surname include:

- Alf Hurum (1882–1972), Norwegian composer and painter
- Hans Jørgen Hurum (1906–2001), Norwegian music critic and non-fiction writer
- Helge Hurum (born 1936), Norwegian jazz musician, composer, arranger and musical director
- Per Hurum (1910–1989), Norwegian sculptor
