= Prostitution in Norway =

Prostitution in Norway is illegal and a criminal act when sexual acts are purchased, but not when sold. The Norwegian law prohibiting the buying of sexual acts came into effect on 1 January 2009, following the passing of new legislation by the Norwegian parliament in November 2008. Soliciting and advertising "sexual services" is also illegal under the Norwegian Criminal Code section 378 and section 202(3).

== History ==
=== Early era ===
In early times, proscription of prostitution fell under more general laws on fornication and adultery, particularly after the Reformation. Around this time, sexual acts started to be moved from civil law (largely with fines) to criminal law. For instance, in one part of Mediaeval law, the Frostathing Law, it is stated, "If a woman lies with a man whom she is not allowed to possess, she owes a fine of three marks, just as he does with whom she lies". Regulation of sexuality in the High Middle Ages was largely a function of the Church, for whom only heterosexual sexual relations within marriage were acceptable. Despite this, prostitution was not considered amongst the most serious sexual crimes, but was frequently associated with other nuisances such as gambling, drinking, and causing a disturbance.

=== Nineteenth century ===
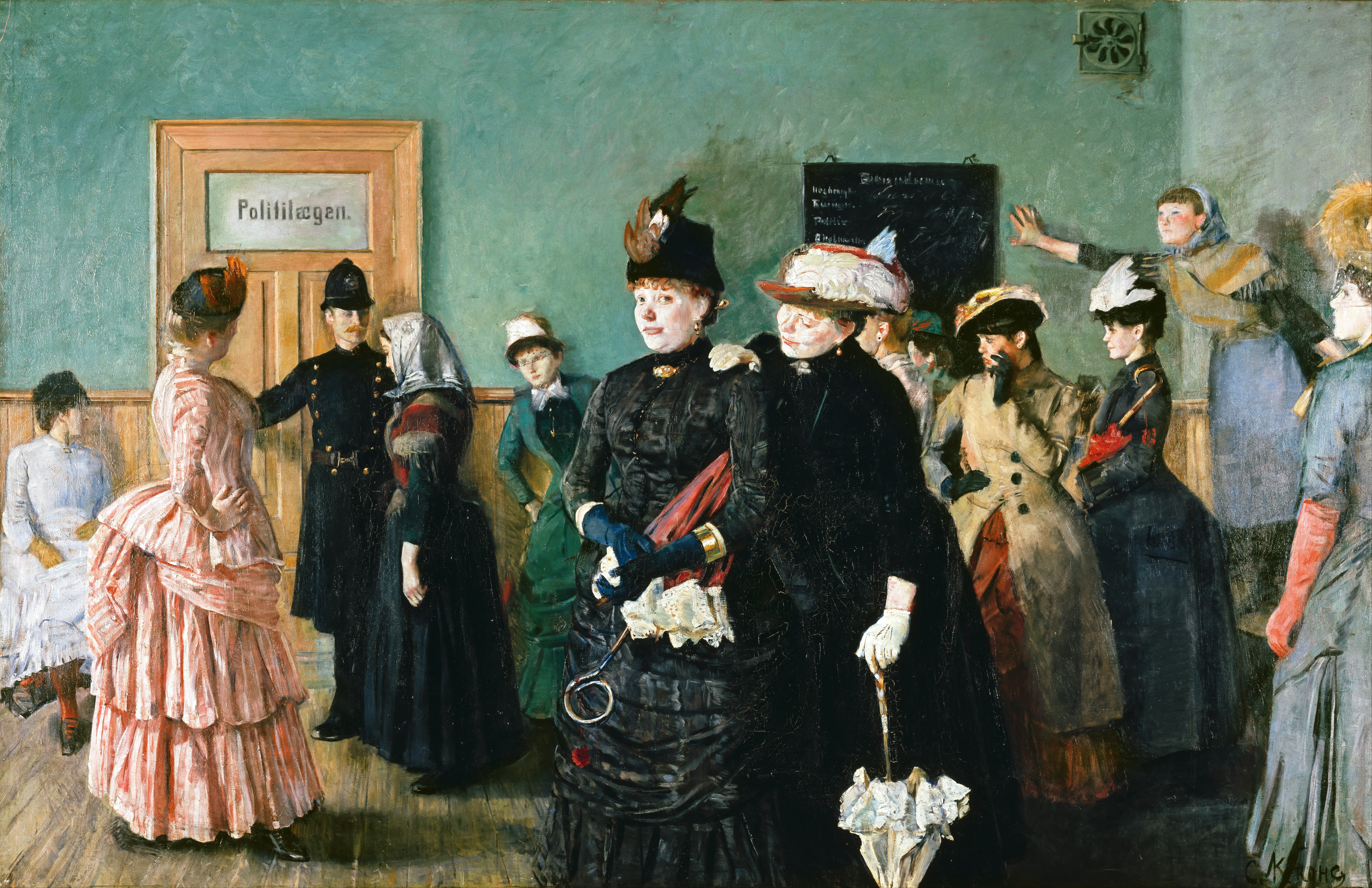
Albertine at the Police Doctor's Waiting Room, by Christian Krohg, 1886–1887

Prostitution was criminalised in Norway with the introduction of the new Criminal Code (Norske Lov) in 1842, but was made legal again when the Penal Code (Straffeloven) was revised in 1902, when the prohibition of both the sale and purchase of sex was lifted. However, even during that time, it was actually tolerated and regulated in practice, in the larger cities such as Oslo, Bergen, and Trondheim. While prostitution was defined as an immoral vice, it was street prostitution that was especially frowned upon, being visible. It was also considered important to distinguish between "decent" and "indecent" women. The regulation of prostitution in Europe (Regulationism) was closely tied to the concept that prostitution was a source of venereal disease, requiring medical supervision. This form of regulation first appeared in Bergen, then the largest Norwegian municipality, in 1816, in (what is now known as) Oslo in 1840, and Trondheim in 1844. Regulation was at least on the surface contrary to the Penal Code which had made fornication and hence prostitution a criminal offence in 1842. In practice the latter law was considered only to apply to males.

The media, the church, and social commentators started to express concerns about prostitution which was labelled as The Great Social Evil. Various institutions stated a desire to rescue 'fallen women', and help them exit their trade and 're-enter society', training them for positions such as domestic servants.

In the mid-nineteenth century, there was a growth of organised society, in which religious and philanthropic organisations developed, many of which had a predominance of women members. Amongst these were "societies for the defense of moral standards", concerned inter alia with prostitution and the government's failure to deal with it.

Brothels were eventually prohibited in Norway in 1887 as part of a pan-European moral reform campaign of Abolitionism that replaced Regulationism and was supposed to end prostitution. The change in the Penal Code in 1902 did not, however, mean that prostitution was more tolerated by society. The exchange of sex in one's own home was now legal, but loitering and procurement was not, and women seen selling sex in public were directed to "rehabilitation" programs.

=== Modern era ===
A Pan-Scandinavian conference on prostitution was held in Lillehammer in 1993. Sex workers participated, and the emphasis was on harm reduction. Liv Jessen from Pro-Sentret compared this to the punitive approach of the radical "Women's Front" (Kvinnefronten), a feminist activist group. The debate on what to do was to continue for another 30 years. Kvinnenfronten had been founded in 1972, and was to work for a change in the law over all of that time.

== Legal framework ==
The criminal code deals with organised crime (Section 60a), third parties (tredjeparts), and procurers, such as pimps (hallik, halliker (pl.)) or madams (S 202), purchase of sexual "services" (S 202a), purchase under 18 (S 203), and human trafficking (menneskehandel) (S 224).

=== Norwegian General Civil Penal Code (Straffeloven) ===
Section 60a
"If a criminal act has been committed as part of the activity of an organised criminal group, the maximum penalty laid down in the penal provision shall be increased to double its prescribed limit, but not by more than five years' imprisonment.

An organised criminal group is here defined as an organised group of three or more persons whose main purpose is to commit an act that is punishable by imprisonment for a term of not less than three years, or whose activity largely consists of committing such acts. An increase of the maximum penalty pursuant to the present provision shall be applicable in relation to statutory provisions that give legal effect to the penalty limit, unless it is otherwise provided."

Section 202
"Anyone who a) promotes the engagement of other persons in prostitution, or b) lets premises on the understanding that such premises shall be used for prostitution or is grossly negligent in this respect

shall be liable to fines or to imprisonment for a term not exceeding five years.

Any person who in a public announcement unambiguously offers, arranges or asks for prostitution shall be liable to fines or to imprisonment for a term not exceeding six months.

In this provision, prostitution means that a person engages in sexual activity or commits a sexual act with another person in return for payment."

Section 202a
"Any person who a) procures sexual intercourse or any other sexual act, for himself/herself or for another person, in return for payment or agreement to provide payment, b) procures sexual intercourse or any other sexual act in return for another person paying or agreeing to pay, or c) in the manner described in a) or b) above induces someone to carry out acts that are equivalent to sexual intercourse with himself/herself

shall be liable to a fine or up to 6 months' imprisonment or both.

If the sexual intercourse or act has been particularly humiliating in its nature, but it is not punishable under any other law, the punishment is imprisonment for a term of up to 1 year."

Section 203
"Any person who, in return for payment, procures sexual intercourse or any other sexual act from a person under the age of 18, shall be liable to a fine or up to 2 years’ imprisonment. Being mistaken about someone's age does not affect criminal liability, unless diligent good faith has been shown."

Section 224
"Any person who by force, threats, abuse of another person's vulnerability or other improper conduct exploits another person for the purpose of a) prostitution or other sexual purposes, b) forced labour or forced services, including begging, c) military service in a foreign country, or d) removal of any of the said person's organs, or who induces another person to allow himself or herself to be used for such purposes, shall be guilty of human trafficking, and shall be liable to imprisonment for a term not exceeding five years.

Any person who a) makes arrangements for such exploitation or inducement as is mentioned in the first paragraph by procuring, transporting or receiving the person concerned, b) in any other way aids and abets such exploitation or inducement, or c) provides payment or any other advantage in order to obtain consent to such exploitation from any person who is in a position of authority over the aggrieved party, or who receives such payment or other advantage shall be liable to the same penalty.

Any person who commits an act referred to in the first or second paragraph against a person who is under the age of 18 shall be liable to a penalty independently of any use of force or threats, abuse of a person’s vulnerability, or other improper conduct. Being mistaken about someone’s age does not affect criminal liability, unless diligent good faith has been shown.

Gross human trafficking is punishable by imprisonment for a term not exceeding ten years. In deciding whether the offence is gross, particular importance shall be attached to whether the person exposed to the act was under the age of 18, whether gross violence or coercion was used or whether the act led to considerable gain."

=== Other acts ===
The Planning and Building Act
Specifies requirements for premises where commercial activities take place, used to close massage parlours occupying premises that do not meet the requirements for commercial activities.

Tax and VAT
All income is taxable, including income from prostitution, but implementation varies. Some people have been made to pay tax on their estimated earnings from prostitution, while some have registered as self-employed, to benefit from the rights that taxpayers have. Most services are liable to VAT.

Welfare
Prostitution is not considered legal work in Norway. Those entitled to social welfare benefits may claim economical support from NAV when not employed and indigent.

Immigration Act
It is for foreigners to work as prostitutes in Norway, because prostitution is not considered legal work. Section 27 states that foreigners can be deported for breaches of the peace.

Police Act
Section 7 (Public order and peace) allows the police to stop breaches of the peace or intervene when there is reason to fear such a breach.

Child Welfare Act
Protects and gives rights to children under the age of 18. If a child is in the company of sex workers, this may lead to intervention under the act. All government employees have a duty to report to the child welfare authorities if they see a child who may be suffering from neglect.

Communicable Diseases Control Act
Entitles residents to preventive care, diagnosis and treatment for such diseases. It does not allow collective restrictions to be imposed on sex workers.

== Prostitution in Norway in the 21st century ==
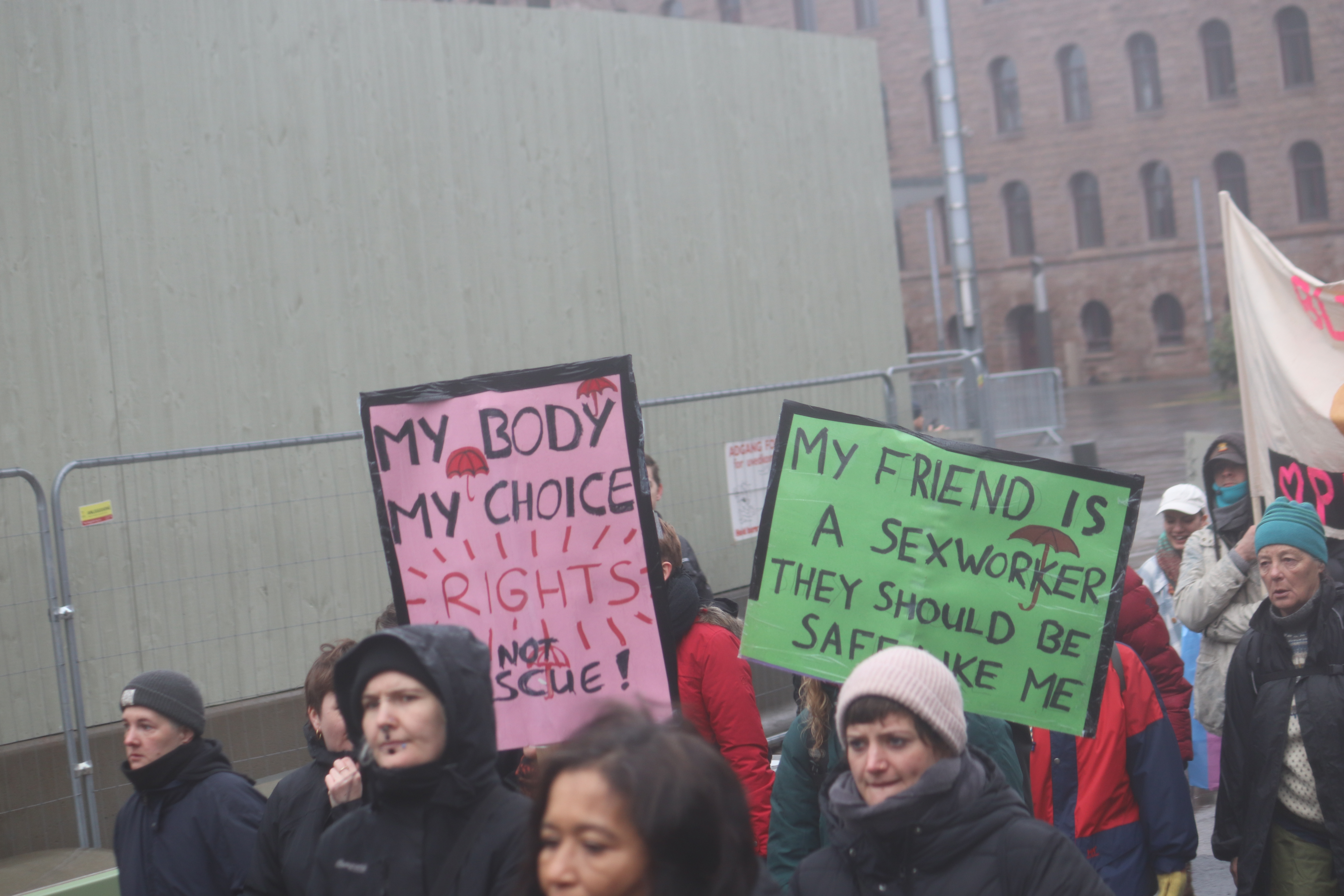
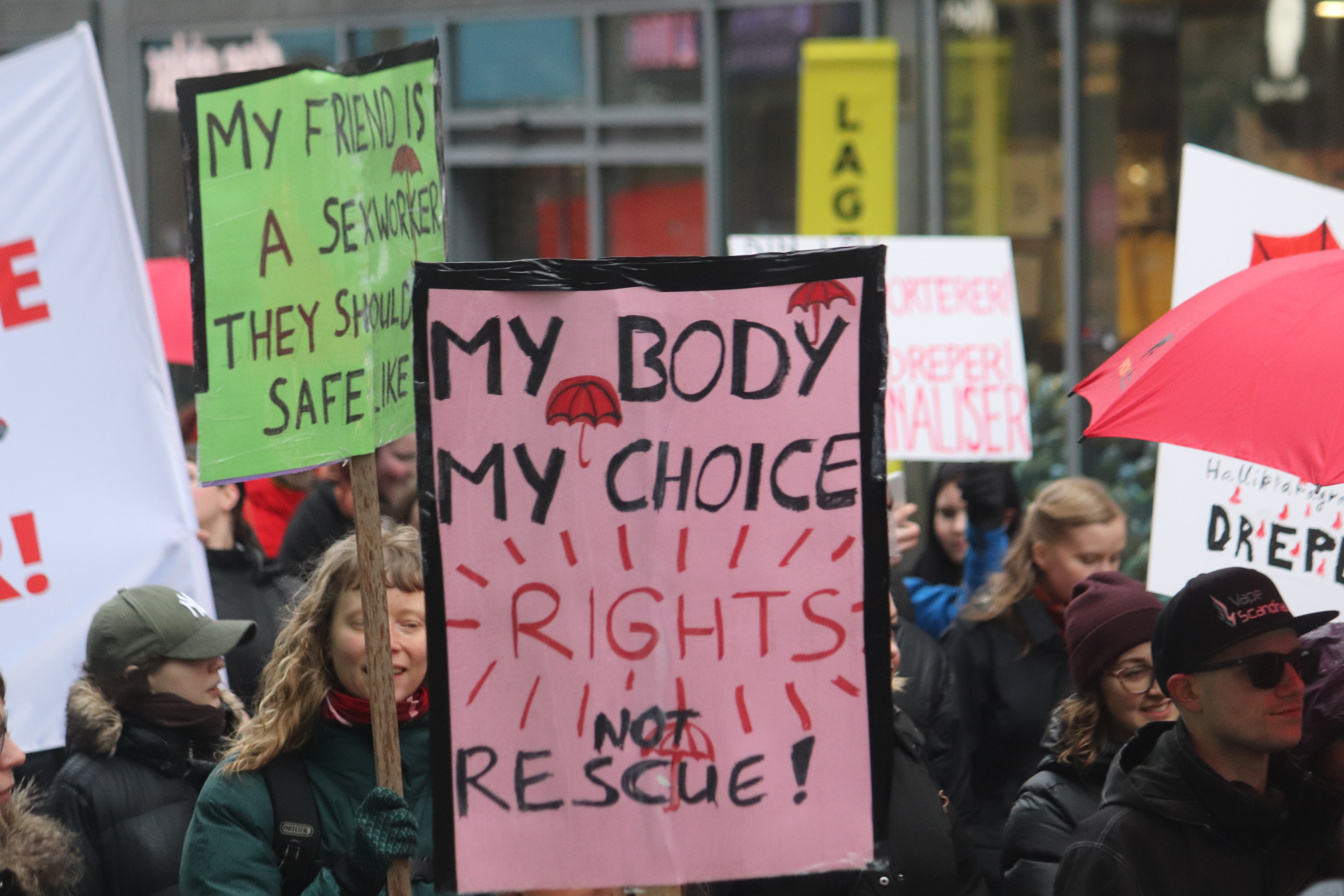
People calling for sex workers' rights on Women's Day 2020 in Oslo

In 2013, it was estimated there were 3,000 sex workers (prostituert, prostituerte (pl.)) working in Norway (population 5 million). Earnings from sex trade are estimated at 390 million kroner (£39m., $US63m., €48m.).

Norwegian prostitutes make a clear distinction between the term "prostitute" and "sex worker", seeing "prostitution" as a derogatory word (nedlatende ord). They also describe themselves as gledespike (literally, fille de joie), or hjelpepleier (health worker). As in most countries, prostitution takes on a number of different forms, including street prostitution (Gateprostitusjon) and indoor prostitution in brothels (bordell, bordeller (pl.)). Technically, both street work and brothel operations (bordellvirksomhet) are legal, even though purchase of those "services" is not, but as with other countries, technological change has resulted in a shift to offering "services" from street solicitation to mobile phones and the internet. While brothels are technically legal in that there is no explicit law banning them (de jure), the sex purchase ban prevents them operating overtly (de facto). As a form of protest, it was suggested that some sex workers might operate free brothels that circumvent the ban, to make this point. Later, it was stated that this was an exercise designed primarily to stimulate debate on the issue.

The current law banning purchase creates an administrative anomaly, since any money earned is illegal, yet is taxable. Recent legislative proposals have included a ban on advertising. Some sex workers have complained about the lack of government consultation with them. In July 2014, the Nadheim City Mission has reported that street prostitution levels in Norway have returned to those prior to the introduction of the law in 2009.

== Sex purchase ban ==
=== First consideration ===
The possibility of criminalising the purchase of sex was discussed in an official report in 1997; however, neither the Justice Department (Justis- og politidepartementet) nor the Storting (Parliament) were in favour of taking this step. The Department did, however, promise to re-look at the situation in two years. Norway then criminalised the purchase of sex from people under the age of 18 in 2000 (Law 76, 11 August; Penal Code art. §203).

=== Working group report 2004 ===
Although Sweden had banned the purchase of sex in 1999, opinions remained divided in Norway. In 2003, as part of its Plan of Action to Combat Trafficking in Women and Children , the Justice Ministry investigated the situation in both the Netherlands (which had recently legalised brothels) and Sweden to better inform the debate, and concluded that neither approach would be appropriate at that point. The working group for this report was chaired by Professor Ulf Stridbeck, of Oslo University's law school.

With regard's to Sweden's law, the group found that reliable data was unavailable, the law was difficult to enforce, and had had little impact (p. 23). The difference between the two countries they saw was the different way they defined prostitution, and hence approached it (p. 45). They were particularly concerned about the unintended effects of the Swedish approach (p. 52).

=== Changing policy due to immigration ===
The debate which finally led to the introduction of the sex purchase ban concerned the effects of the arrival of women from Africa, typically Nigerian, on the streets of Norway. It was argued that human trafficking was fuelled by a demand for sex and that therefore a ban was necessary, and whether solicitation was offensive.

=== Current law (Sexkjøpsloven) ===
In November 2008, the Storting passed legislation which criminalised purchasing sex (sexkjøploven). This became Section 202a of the Norwegian Penal Code.

Section 202a

Any person who

(a) engages in or aids and abets another person to engage in sexual activity or commit a sexual act on making or agreeing payment,
(b) engages in sexual activity or a sexual act on such payment being agreed or made by another person, or
(c) in the manner described in (a) or (b) causes someone to carry out with herself or himself acts corresponding to sexual activity,

shall be liable to fines or to imprisonment for a term not exceeding six months or to both.

If the sexual activity or sexual act is carried out in a particularly offensive manner and no penalty may be imposed pursuant to other provisions, the penalty shall be imprisonment for a term not exceeding one year

The ban extends to Norwegians outside of Norway (extra territorial law).

=== Effect of sex purchase ban ===
Despite an initial drop in the visibility of street prostitution, later reports suggested it had returned to its previous levels. This created great difficulties for Norwegian street workers. A 2012 report on violence against sex workers created considerable interest in the media and a questioning of the law's effects. There has been considerable criticism of the law and its effects. It has proved difficult to evaluate the law, due to the problems of isolating laws from other social factors. For instance, the police have targeted the sellers as much as the purchasers, including evicting them from their homes, so-called Operasjon Husløs, and the law has been enforced patchily from region to region. Other reports suggest that despite some initial decline in street prostitution when the new law was introduced, the number of people selling sex is now greater than ever. Norwegians were also interested in a report released in July 2010 in Sweden, since it suggested a large increase in prostitution in neighbouring Nordic countries, once the Swedish law came into effect. It has also been suggested that the law has led to an unfair discrimination against immigrant women. An evaluation of the law was published in August 2014. (see Evaluation)

=== Evaluation (Evaluering) 2014 ===
In 2013, prior to the elections, the Justice Ministry announced plans to evaluate the law, with applications to contract closing at the end of August, being awarded to Vista Analyse. However, researchers have criticised this because neither the budget nor the scope seem likely to provide useful answers. The evaluation was not expected to add much new to what was already known.

==== Findings ====
The report was released on 11 August 2014. It stated that the law had met its mandate, and that the street market had been reduced, and probably also the indoor market, but that this was more difficult to estimate:

Main findings.
The ban on purchasing sexual services has reduced demand for sex and thus contribute to reduce the extent of prostitution in Norway. The enforcement of the law, in combination with the laws against trafficking and pimping, makes Norway a less attractive country for prostitution based trafficking than what would have been the case if the law had not been adopted. Furthermore, the economic conditions for prostitution in Norway are reduced following the implementation of the law. These effects are in line with the intentions of the law and are thus not considered as unintended side effects. This report does not find any evidence of more violence against prostitutes after the ban on buying sex entered into force.

==== Response ====
Critics argued that while one could show trends in prostitution, it was simplistic to argue that they were a direct result of regulatory change, given the complex social phenomenon and the many forces acting on it. Vidar Brein-Karlsen (FrP), the Justice Secretary, has promised a thorough parliamentary inquiry (stortingsmelding). The conclusions conflict with other studies, and the definition of "success" has been a subject of debate. The report also states that it has become much more difficult to be a sex worker in Norway. As with the corresponding Swedish evaluation (performed at ten years), the analysis appeared to be gender blind.

== Politics of prostitution ==
The 2008 sex purchase ban was passed by the centre-left red-green coalition government. At the time of the passage of the purchase law, it was opposed by the centre-right opposition parties in the Storting, including the Conservatives (Høyre, H), the Progress Party (Fremskrittspartiet, FrP), and the Liberals (Venstre, V). The bill passed 44 to 28, with the Labour Party (Arbeiderpartiet, A/Ap), Socialist Left (Sosialistisk Venstreparti, SV), Centre (Senterpartiet, Sp), and Christian Democrats (Kristelig Folkeparti, KrF) voting in favour, and the Conservatives, Progress Party, and Liberals voting against.

The opposition parties continued to express their objections, according to Conservative MP Bent Høie and Anniken Hauglie, a fellow Conservative and Commissioner for Social Services in Oslo. Following revelations that selling sex was as prevalent as ever, and that reporters posing as clients were easily able to negotiate transactions, Conservative MP André Oktay Dahl, deputy chairman of the Standing Committee on Justice (Justiskomiteen), called for a repeal of the law, as did his fellow Progress Party member Ase Michaelsen.

=== 2013 elections ===
The change of government in the September 2013 election, which created a Conservative (48 seats) led coalition with the Progress Party (29 seats), created an opportunity for the laws to be revisited, and the Liberals (9 seats) pressed for reform. Høie has now become the Minister of Health and Care Services.

Amongst those continuing to support the law are the Christian Democrats (10 seats), who wish to see the law strengthened. They and the Liberals hold the balance of power in supporting the minority Conservative coalition government. Opposition parties supporting the law include the Labour Party, which holds the greatest number of seats (55), and the Socialist Left (7 seats). Critics of the law include Sveinung Rotevatn (V) and Conservative leader Trond Helleland, as well as the Green (De Grønne, MDG) (1 seat). Marthe Hammer (SV), leader of her party's women's movement, sees the law as having symbolic value, sending a message that buying sex is unacceptable. However, even the KrF agree the effects of the law should be evaluated. Support is particularly strong amongst the youth wings of the parties. The twelve-member Justice Committee is currently chaired by Hadia Tajik (A), a strong supporter of the law, with Anders Bjørnsen Werp (H) and Kjell Ingolf Ropstad (KrF) as deputies. Jan Arild Ellingsen represents Progress on the committee, and is an outspoken critic, as is Ropstad. Werp and Justice Minister Anders Anundsen (FrP), saying only that they will review the evaluation. News from the Nadheim City Mission in July 2014, that the levels of prostitution in Norway had returned to those before the introduction of the law, reignited the debate, with Rotevatn stating that there was a sufficient majority in parliament to rescind the law, and that, unless the evaluation produced startingly positive results, this should now proceed.

In November 2013, the Mayor of Oslo, Stian Berger Røsland, stated that selling sex was now so prevalent in Oslo that the government should ban the sale, as well as purchase, of sex. By January 2014, all parties had created platforms around prostitution policy.

The law is supported by many women's organisations, such as the radical feminist Kvinnefronten. Despite political opposition, a January 2014 survey estimated the law having 65% support, but at least one newspaper editorial has called for repeal.

=== 2014 evaluation ===
Following release of the report in August 2014, there was little evidence of any shift in political positions. While the Ap and SV celebrated, and the KrF warned the government not to change the law, the FrP stated that it changed nothing, while the H want a thorough discussion of this and other studies. The issue has now moved into the area of public and political debate; one of the arguments being whether this is merely a matter of whether morality should be legislated, or whether it is about the protection of the vulnerable. Others, especially the social services, dispute the validity of the numbers used, while Kvinnefronten welcomed the news. A critical analysis by researchers suggests that the process has not advanced knowledge, and that the result is inconclusive.

== Advocacy and support ==
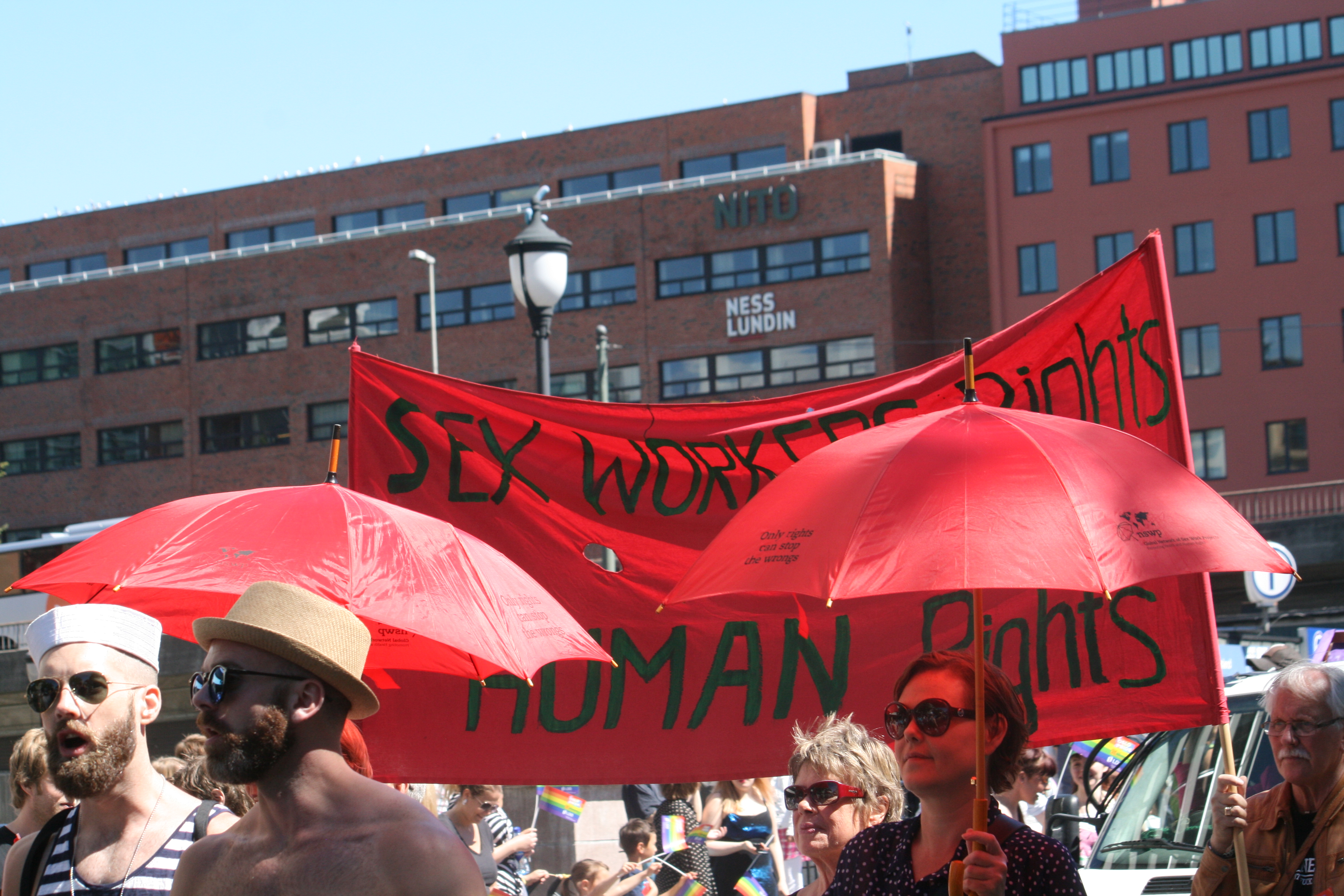
A banner calling for Sex workers' rights at Oslo Pride in 2015

PION (Prostitutes Interest Organisation in Norway) provides support and advocacy for those involved in prostitution in Norway. Other organisations include Nadheim City Mission, a church-based group, and ROSA, an organisation dealing with victims of human trafficking.

Pro Sentret is a health and social service centre for sex workers, and a national coordination centre for prostitution issues. It was set up by Oslo city, and co-funded by the government, with some private donations. It provides health care, social services, legal assistance, and counselling to sex workers of all genders. It has both a drop-in centre and outreach services. Nationally, it carries out research and education on prostitution, and provides a resource on national and international developments in prostitution. In December 2013, Oslo City Council substantially reduced funding to Pro Sentret.

== Culture ==
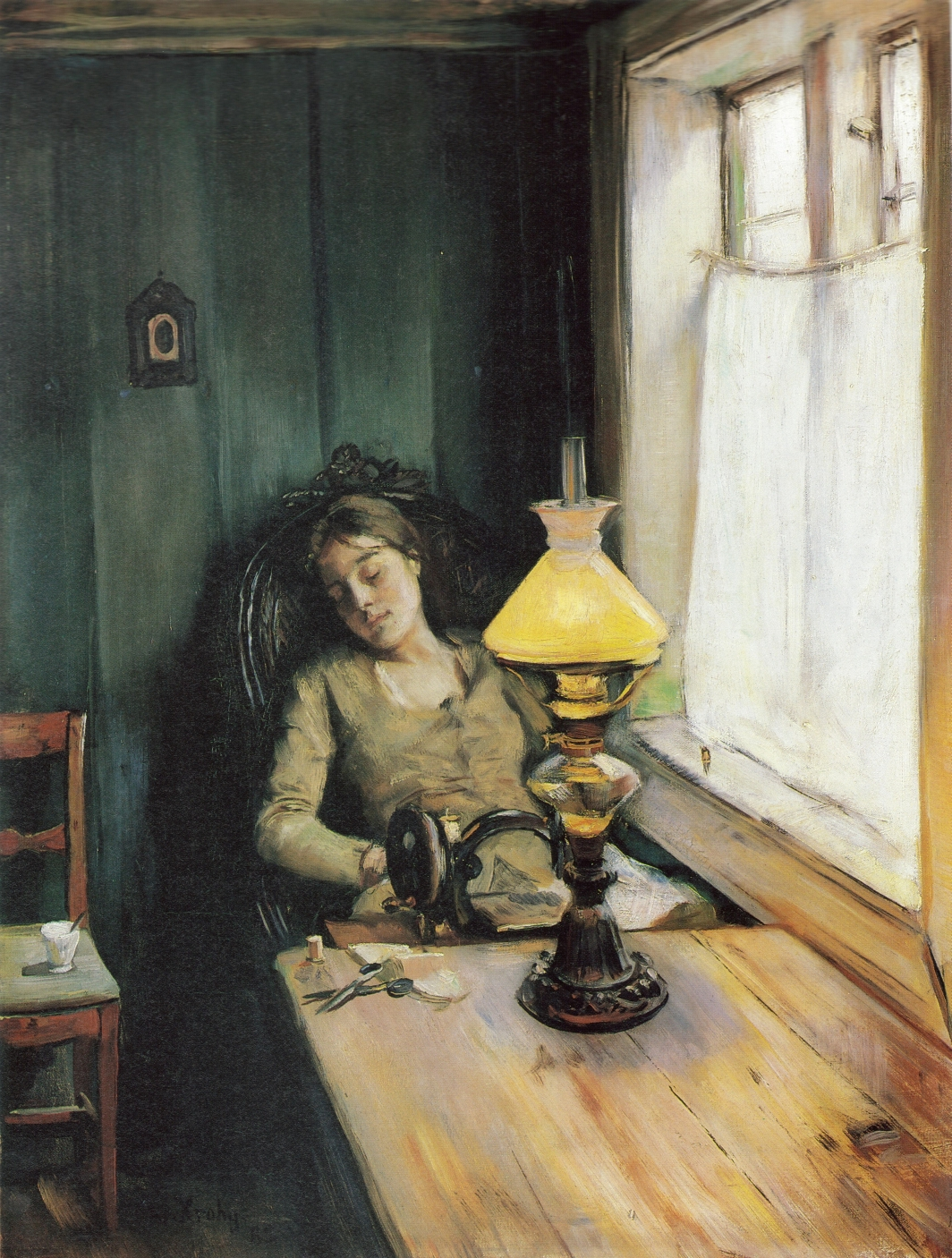
Christian Krohg: Trett (English: "Tired") 1885 from the Albertine series

In 1886, Christian Krohg wrote a novel titled Albertine (see illustration above) about a seamstress of that name living in what was then Christiana (Oslo) forced into prostitution by poverty and abuse. Although the book was confiscated, and Krogh was fined, the ensuing debate expedited the abolition of prostitution in Norway. Krohg also executed several paintings on the Albertine theme. Despite this, prostitution was a frequent theme in nineteenth century literature.

A Norwegian architect has designed a brothel, as a symbolic gesture.

== Sex trafficking ==
Norway is a destination and, to a lesser extent, transit and source country for women and girls subjected to sex trafficking. Trafficking victims identified in Norway primarily originate from Eastern Europe and Africa, particularly Bulgaria, Lithuania, Nigeria, and Romania, as well as victims from Pakistan and the Philippines.

The United States Department of State Office to Monitor and Combat Trafficking in Persons ranks Norway as a 'Tier 1' country.

== See also ==
- Parliament of Norway
- Politics of Norway
- List of Norwegian ministries
- Cabinet of Norway
- List of political parties in Norway
- Norwegian Code

== Bibliography ==
- Anne-Marit Gotaas, Brita Gulli, Kari Melby and Aina Schiøtz (eds.), Det kriminelle kjønn: om barnefødsel i dølgsmål, abort og prostitusjon, Oslo, Pax, 1980
- Women's role in cultural life in Norway CC.89/WS/26; CC/CSP/CP/06. UNESCO 1989
- What explains attitudes toward prostitution? Niklas Jakobsson and Andreas Kotsadam. Department of Economics, University of Gothenburg 2009
- Bjørndahl, Ulla (2009) Kjøp og salg av seksuelle tjenester blant unge i Oslo. En sammenstilling av den kunnskapen som finnes om arenaer der ungdom selger og kjøper seksuelle tjenester. Pro Sentret, Oslo
- Do Laws Affect Attitudes? An assessment of the Norwegian prostitution law using longitudinal data. Niklas Jakobsson and Andreas Kotsadam. Department of Economics, University of Gothenburg 2010
- Henriksen, Petter, ed. (2014). "Prostitusjon". Store norske leksikon (in Norwegian). Oslo: Kunnskapsforlaget.
- Menneskerettigheter i Norge: Norsk lov setter sexarbeidere i fare (in Norwegian). 18 May 2016. Amnesty International.
- Amnesty mener norsk lov setter sexarbeidere i fare (in Norwegian). 26 May 2016. Verdens Gang.
- Sexkjøpsloven og sexarbeideres menneskerettigheter (in Norwegian). Amnesty International.

=== History ===
- May-Len Skilbrei. The Rise and Fall of the Norwegian Massage Parlours: Changes in the Norwegian Prostitution Setting in the 1990s. Feminist Review No. 67, Sex Work Reassessed (Spring, 2001), pp. 63-77
- Laurence Marcellus Larson (trans.) The Earliest Norwegian Laws: Being the Gulathing Law and the Frostathing Law. The Lawbook Exchange, Ltd., 2011 ISBN 9781584779254
- Anne Irene Riisøy. Sexuality, Law and legal Practice and the Reformation in Norway (Sex, Rett Og Reformasjon). BRILL, 2009. ISBN 9789004173644
- Historical Bergen: Brothels in Bergen
- Prostitution: Entry in 1st edition of Aschehougs Encyclopedia (1906-1913).

=== Nordic policies ===
- May-Len Skilbrei. Prostitution Policy in the Nordic Region. Ashgate 2013 ISBN 978-1-4094-4426-8
- May-Len Skilbrei and Charlotta Holmström. The ‘Nordic model’ of prostitution law is a myth. The Conversation 16 December 2013
- Skilbrei, May-Len & Charlotta Holmström (2013): Prostitution Policy in the Nordic Region. Ambiguous Sympathies, Farnham: Ashgate.

=== Migrant studies ===
- From Russia with Love? Newspaper Coverage of Cross-Border Prostitution in Northern Norway, 1990-2001. Dag Stenvoll. The European Journal of Women’s Studies. Vol. 9(2): 143-162
- Jana Sverdljuk. Contradicting the 'Prostitution Stigma': Narratives of Russian migrant women living in Norway, in Suvi Keskinen (ed.), Complying with Colonialism: Gender, Race and Ethnicity in the Nordic Region. Ashgate 2009. ISBN 9781409491569
- A. Brunovskis; G. Tyldum. Crossing borders: an empirical study of transnational prostitution and trafficking in human beings. Trafficking of women to Norway. Eldis 2004
- African Dreams on European Streets: Nigerian Women in Prostitution in Norway. (Afrikanske drømmer på europeiske gater:Nigerianske kvinner i prostitusjon i Norge) May-Len Skilbrei, Marianne Tveit and Anette Brunovskis. Fafo-report 525 (summary (in English)) 2006

Full report (in Norwegian)

- Skilbrei, May-Len (2012): “Moving Beyond Assumptions? The Framing of Anti-trafficking Efforts in Norway”, in Ragnhild Sollund (ed.): Transnational Migration, Gender and Rights, Emerald Insight Publishing.

=== Radical feminism (Kvinnenfronten) ===
- Agnete Strøm. A glimpse of 30 years of struggle against prostitution by the women’s liberation movement in Norway. Kvinnenfronten 2011
- Agnete Strøm. "The construction of the consumers in a Nordic setting 1980 - 2010 and the "deconstruction" of the consumers after the law that criminalise the buying of a sexual act were passed in Sweden in 1999, and in Norway and in Island, both 2009." III Latin American Congress on Human Trafficking, 16-18 July 2013

=== Sexually transmitted diseases ===
- Ida Blom. Fighting Venereal Diseases: Scandinavian Legislation c.1800 to c.1950. Med Hist. 2006 1 April; 50(2): 209-234.
- Ida Blom. Medicine and morality - legislation on venereal diseases in Denmark and Norway c. 1900-1994. Michael Quarterly 2010;7:321-330
- Thomas D. Eliot. Norway Conquers Venereal Diseases. Br J Vener Dis. 1955 March; 31(1): 2-8
- H. C. Gjessing. Venereal Diseases Past and Present in Norway with Special Reference to Oslo. Br J Vener Dis. 1956 June; 32(2): 86-90.
