= Asbjørg Borgfelt =

Norwegian sculptor (1900–1976)

Asbjørg Betty Borgfelt
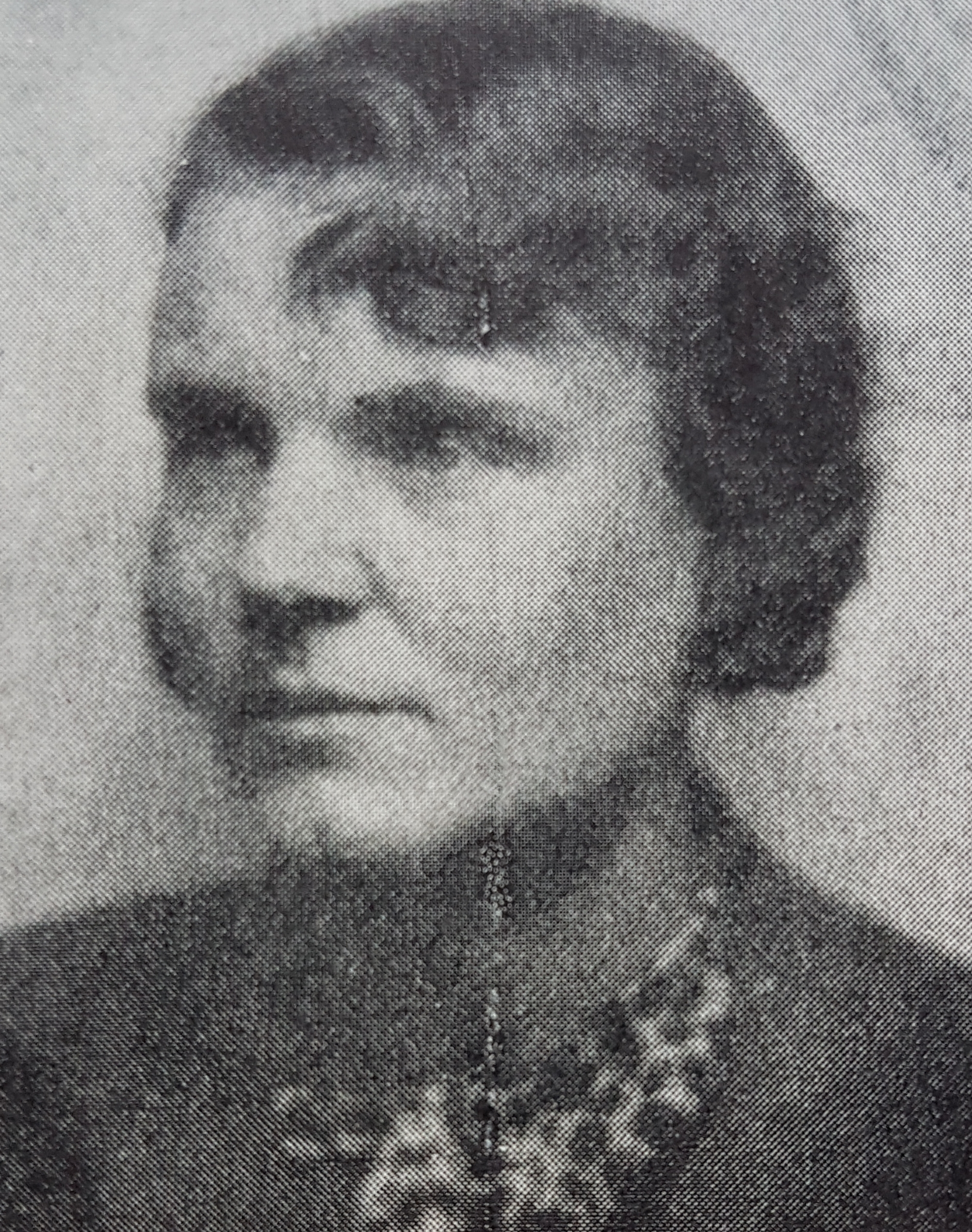
- Born: 31 October 1900; Kristiania, Norway
- Died: 5 June 1976 (aged 75); Oslo
- Known for: Sculpture
- Spouse: Per Hurum (m. 1937)

Asbjørg Borgfelt (31 October 1900 – 5 June 1976) was a Norwegian sculptor.

== Personal life ==
Borgfelt was born on 31 October 1900 in Kristiania (now Oslo), Norway. She was the daughter of Samuel Borgfeldt (1872-1936) and Magnhild Telma Sæther (1876-1941). In 1937 she married sculptor Per Hurum (1910–1989).

== Career ==
Borgfeldt first studied art in Kristiania at the Norwegian National Academy of Craft and Art Industry (Statens Håndverks- og Kunstindustriskole) with Wilhelm Rasmussen (1879–1965). Then she studied in Copenhagen at the Royal Danish Academy of Fine Arts under Einar Utzon-Frank (1888-1955). She was awarded the Henrichsens legat; Mohrs legat (1937), Klaveness' stipend (1964) and Oslo bys stipend (1971). She made several study trips in Denmark, Germany, France and Italy.

She won 1st prize in several competitions including the fountain Bjørnefontene at Majorstua in Oslo (1924–25), Oksefontenen at Torshov in Oslo (1926), the Christian Krohg monument (together with Per Hurum) in Oslo (1950) and for Årets kull at the Bergen Teacher Training College (which was unveiled in 1977 after the artist's death).

Borgfeldt died in Oslo on 5 June 1976, at the age of 75.
