= Gunnar Stubseid =

Norwegian folk musician (1948–2024)

- Born: 23 January 1948; Bygland Municipality, Norway
- Died: June 2024 (aged 76)
- Education: Bergen Teacher Training College; University of Bergen
- Occupations: Educator, folk musician, writer
- Employer: Ole Bull Academy
- Awards: Spellemannprisen (1979)

Gunnar Stubseid (23 January 1948 – June 2024) was a Norwegian educator, ethnologist, folk musician, writer and magazine editor.

== Background ==
Born in Bygland Municipality on 23 January 1948, Stubseid was educated at the Bergen Teacher Training College, and as ethnologist from the University of Bergen.

Stubseid died in June 2024, at the age of 76.

== Musical career ==
Playing the Hardanger fiddle, Stubseid played with the musical group Slinkombas, along with Kirsten Bråten Berg, Hallvard T. Bjørgum and Tellef Kvifte. The group published two albums, one of which was awarded the Spellemannprisen in 1979. He published the album Gorrlaus in 2008.

He edited the magazine Spelemannsbladet from 1978 to 1988. His books include Tippe Tippe Tue (1980), Ungkar og spelemann, and Frå spelemannslære til akademi. He also co-wrote Sjønna på Elbursfjell, and wrote a biography of folk musician Sigbjørn Bernhoft Osa in 2003. From 2003 to 2011 he was rector at the Ole Bull Academy.
