= Albertine (Krohg novel) =

1886 novel by Christian Krohg

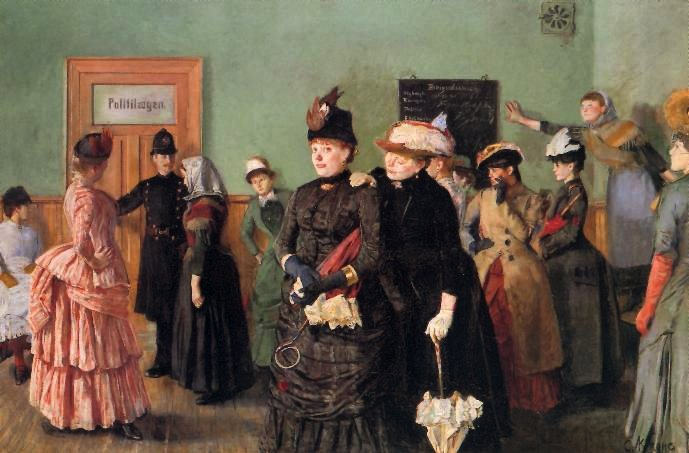
- Albertine in the Police Doctor's Waiting-Room
- Author: Christian Krohg
- Language: Norwegian
- Genre: novel
- Published: 1886
- Publication place: Norway

Albertine is a novel written in 1886 by Norwegian painter and writer Christian Krohg.

The novel is set in Norway's capital, Christiania, and deals with the life of the unmarried seamstress Albertine, who is eventually forced into prostitution due to the social system of the time. In the novel, Krohg criticized the double standards of society, which stigmatized women who were victims of prostitution, while accepting the regulation of prostitution.

The book was confiscated shortly after its publication. In 1888 the Supreme Court of Norway upheld the confiscation, and Krohg was sentenced to pay a fine of 100 kr. Krohg also made several paintings based on the "Albertine" motif, including Trett in 1885 and Albertine i politilægens venteværelse in 1887.

== Plot ==
Albertine is a poor seamstress, living in the eastern part of Christiania. She is being seduced by a "Winther", a police officer, who eventually rapes her while she is unconscious. Later she experiences a humiliating visit to the police doctor's office. She finally ends up as a prostitute, operating in the Vika district of the city.

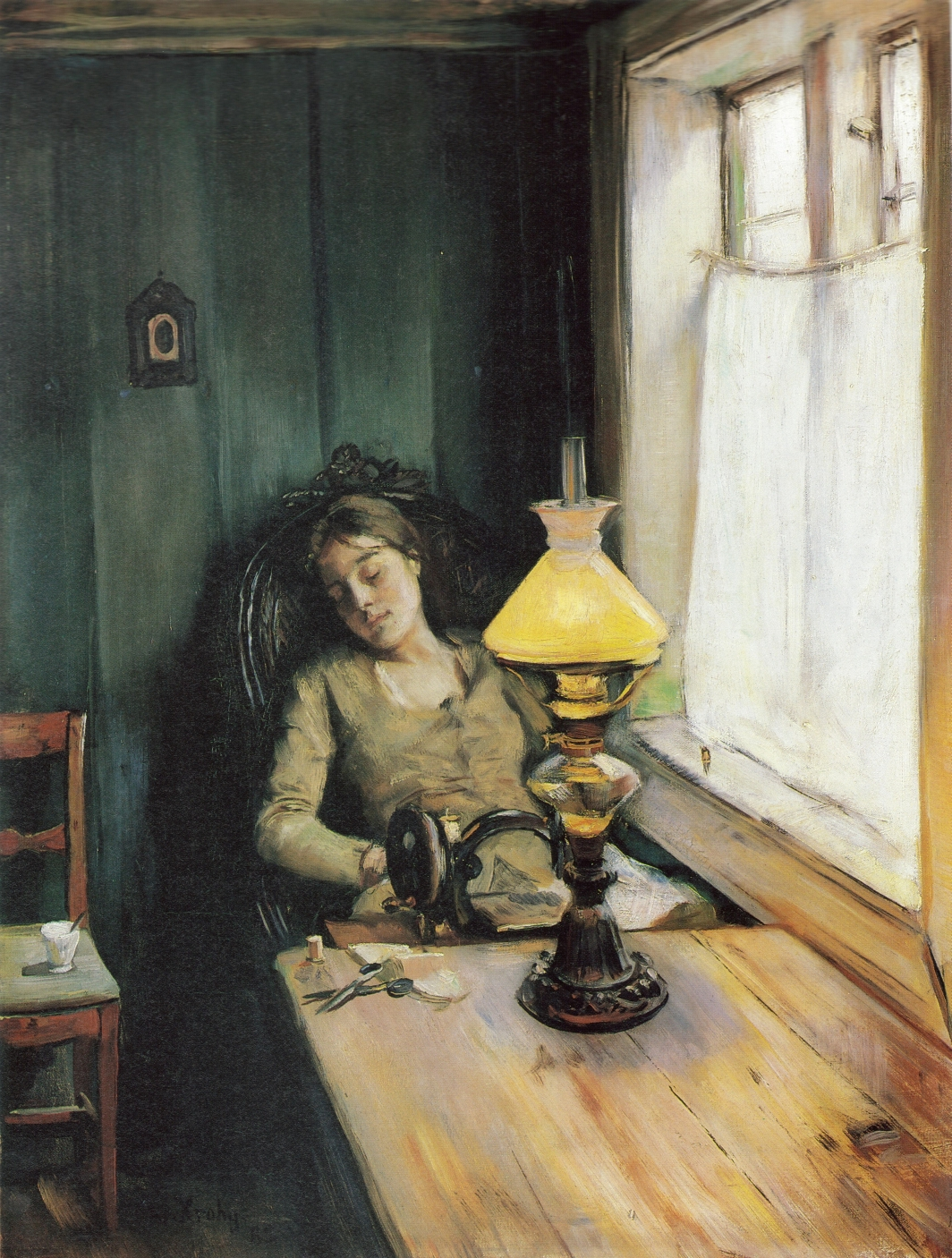
Trett (English: Tired) from 1885

== Confiscation, trial and reactions ==
The book was published on 20 December 1886, and the next day it was confiscated by the police, following orders from the Minister of Justice. A fierce newspaper feud developed, but the confiscation was upheld by the court, both the City Court and the Supreme Court. A demonstration held outside Prime Minister Johan Sverdrup's (1884–1889) office in January 1887 gathered 5,000 protesters, largely workers and students. The Prime Minister defended his fellow Minister's actions and the confiscation, but expressed the view that he would exterminate the problems described in the novel, and within a few years public prostitution was made illegal in the Norwegian capital.

== Impact ==
The debate following the publishing and confiscation of Albertine expedited the abolition of public prostitution in Norway. It has since become a classic work for Norwegian feminists, who were already active in the struggle against legal sex buying and for votes for women.
