= Christian Krohg =

Norwegian painter (1852–1925)

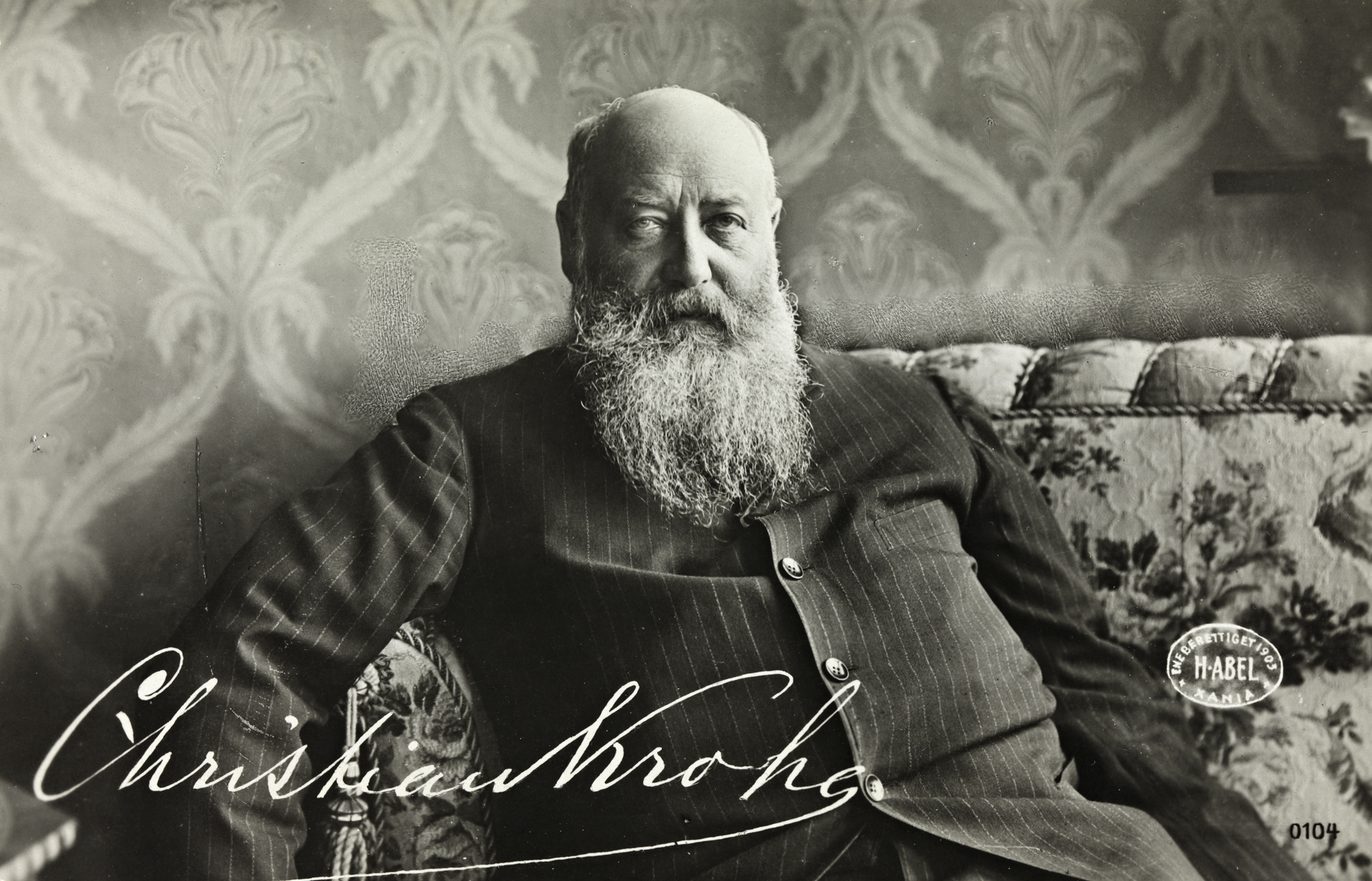
- Krohg, c. 1903
- Born: 13 August 1852; Vestre Aker, Norway
- Died: 16 October 1925 (aged 73); Oslo, Norway
- Education: University of Christiana
- Known for: naturalist painter
- Movement: Naturalism
- Spouse: Oda Krohg (m. 1888)
- Children: 2, including Per

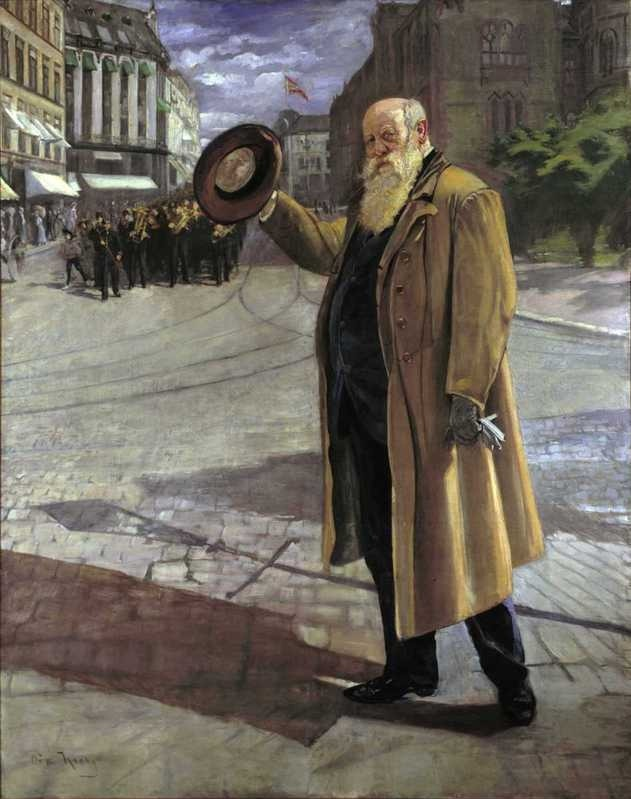
Portrait of Christian Krohg Oda Krohg (c. 1903)

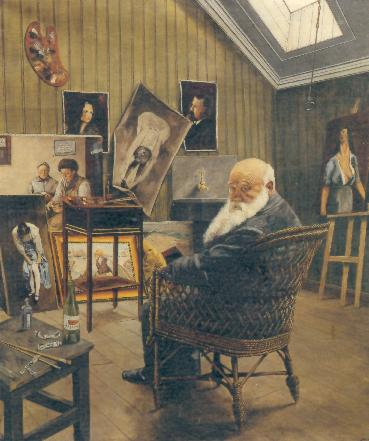
Self-portrait (1917)

Christian Krohg (13 August 1852 – 16 October 1925) was a Norwegian naturalist painter, illustrator, author and journalist. Krohg was inspired by the realism art movement and often chose motifs from everyday life. He was the director and served as the first professor at the Norwegian Academy of Arts from 1909 to 1925.

== Biography ==
Christian Krohg was born at Vestre Aker (now Oslo), Norway. He was one of five children born to Georg Anton Krohg (1817–1873) and Sophie Amalia Holst (1822–1861). He was a grandson of Christian Krohg (1777–1828) who had served as a government minister. His father was a civil servant, journalist and author. His mother died when he was only 8 years old, and his father's sister took over responsibility for the household and the upbringing of the children. From 1861, he attended Hartvig Nissen School.

His father had asked him to pursue a legal career. Krohg studied law at the University of Oslo (then Christiania) graduating cand.jur. in 1873, the same year in which his father died. During 1869–70, he had also studied at the art school of Johan Fredrik Eckersberg at Lille Grensen in Christiania. He was additionally educated in Germany, first at the Baden School of Art in Karlsruhe under Hans Gude in 1874. He also trained under Karl Gussow from 1875. He followed with study at the Königliche Akademie in Berlin from 1875 to 1878.

He was awarded the Schäffer's legacy (1876–77) and received a government travel allowance during 1877–78 and in 1881. In 1879, on the encouragement of artist Frits Thaulow, he visited the Skagen artists colony. He returned to Skagen in 1882–1884 and 1888. Through his periodic future residence at Skagen, he would influence other artists including Anna and Michael Ancher and provided early support to Edvard Munch.

Krohg worked in Paris from 1881 to 1882. Inspired by the ideas of the realists he chose motifs primarily from everyday life – often its darker or socially inferior sides. Prostitution is the subject of his painting Albertine i politilægens venteværelse, and Krohg also wrote a novel about the depicted scene. The novel, Albertine, caused a scandal when first published, and it was confiscated by the police.

Krohg's style made him a leading figure in the transition from romanticism to naturalism.

Krohg was the founding and editor-in-chief of the Kristiania Bohemian journal, Impressionisten from 1886 until 1890. He then became a journalist for the Oslo newspaper Verdens Gang from 1890 to 1910. Christian Krohg was also associated with Politiken 1893–1894.

He taught at Académie Colarossi in Paris from 1902 until 1909. Later he became a professor-director at the Norwegian Academy of Arts (Statens Kunstakademi) from 1909 until 1925.

There are notable collections of art by Christian Krohg in the National Museum of Art, Architecture and Design in Oslo and at Skagens Museum in Denmark.

== Awards and honors ==
Christian Krohg received numerous national and international awards during his career. In 1889, he was made a Knight in the French Legion of Honour and entered in the Belgian Order of Leopold in 1894. He served as Norwegian Commissioner at the Exposition Internationale d'Anvers at Antwerp in 1894 and held membership in the Societe Nouvelle de Peintres et de Sculpteurs from 1900. Krohg was made a Knight 1st Class in the Order of St. Olav in 1900 and received the Command Cross in 1910.

== Personal life ==
He was married to artist Oda Lasson (1860–1935). In 1885, their daughter Nana (1885–1974) was born and in 1889 their son muralist Per Lasson Krohg (1889–1965). In 1888, Oda obtained a divorce from her first husband Jørgen Engelhardt; they were married in that same year. In 1897, his wife took their son Per and moved to Paris with dramatist Gunnar Heiberg. They were later reconciled. In 1914, Christian Krohg established residence near Frogner Park where he died in 1925. Oda Krohg died in 1935. Both were buried at Vår Frelsers gravlund in Oslo.

A bronze statue of Krohg by sculptors Per Hurum and Asbjørg Borgfelt was erected at the crossing of Lille Grensen-Karl Johans gate in Oslo in 1960.

== Gallery ==
=== Portraits ===
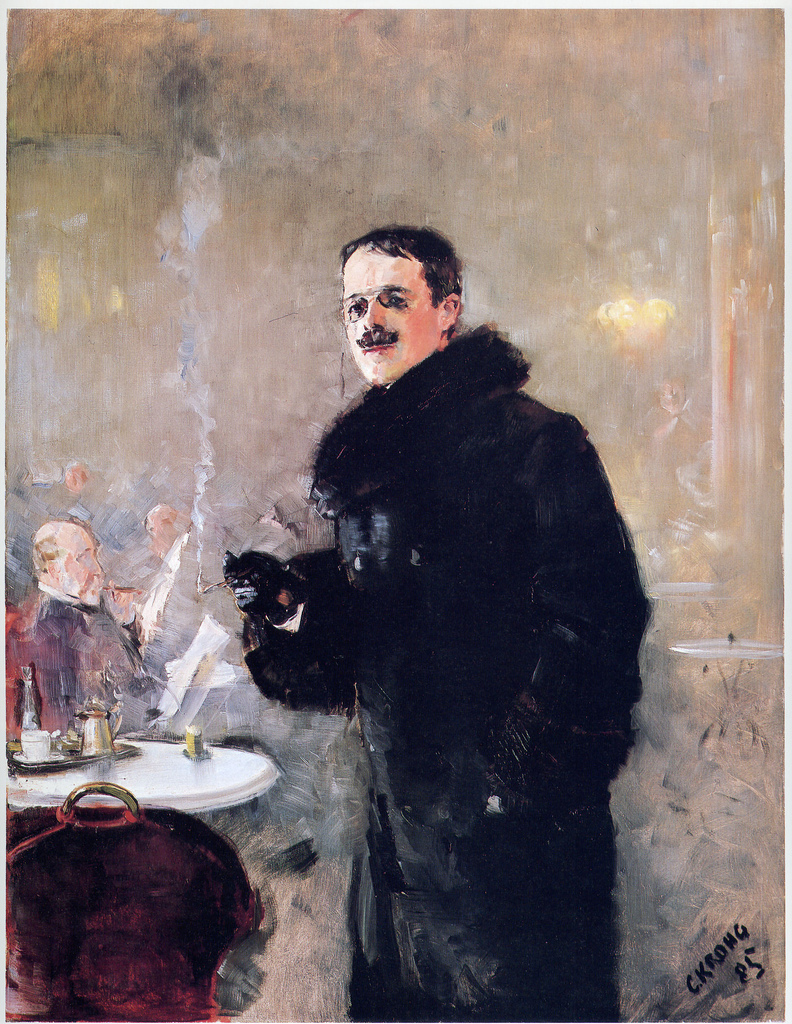
Portrait of the Painter Gerhard Munthe

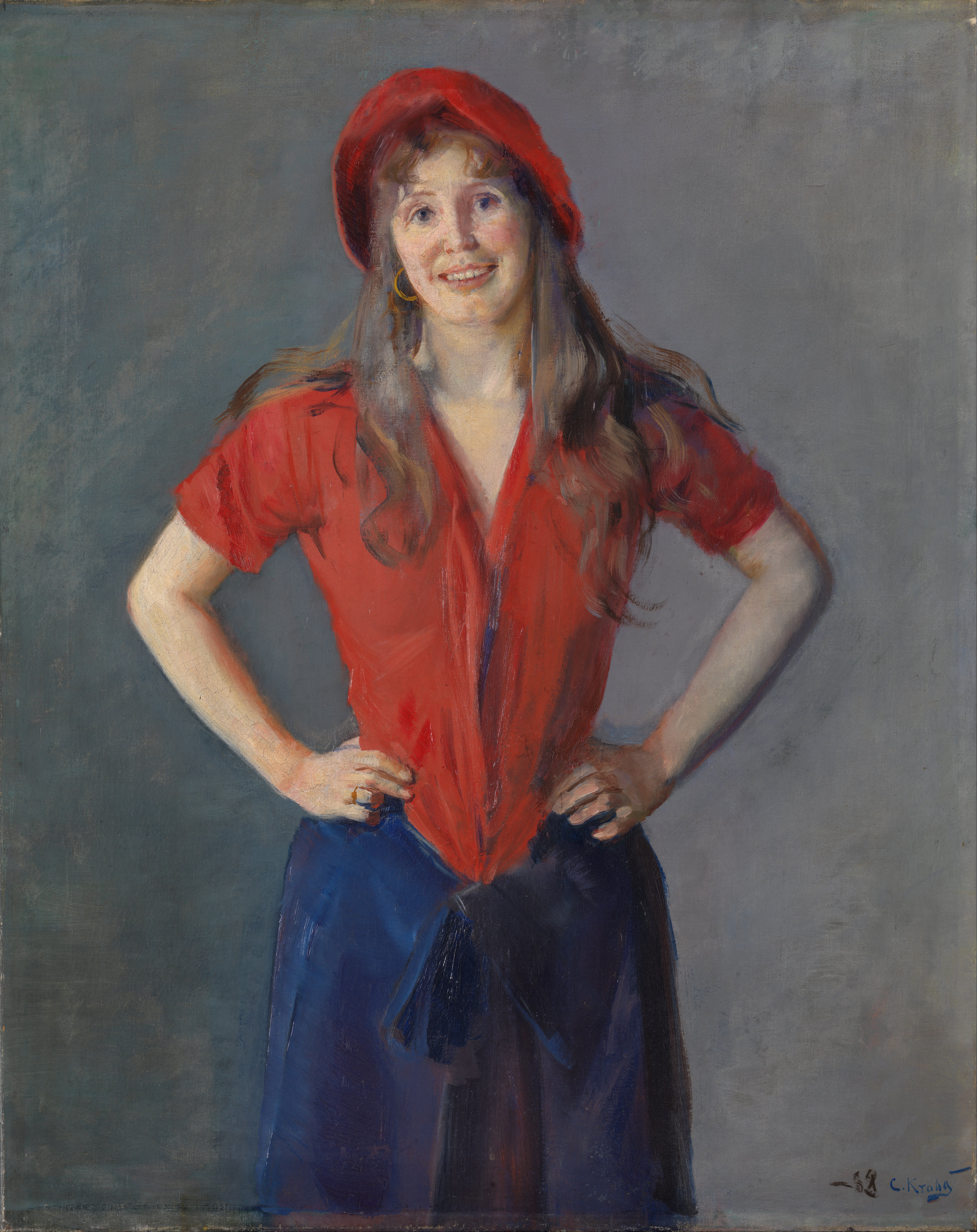
Oda Krohg (Portrait of Oda Krohg. 1888)

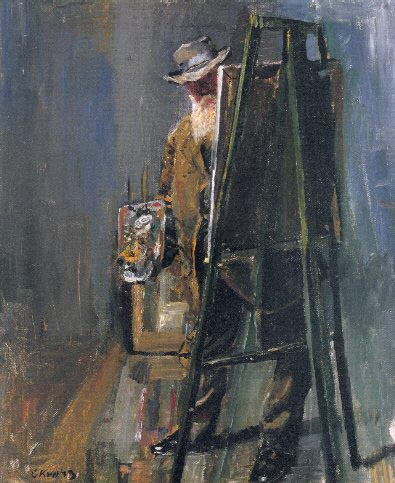
Selvportrett med staffeli (Self-portrait with easel. 1912)

=== Social realism ===
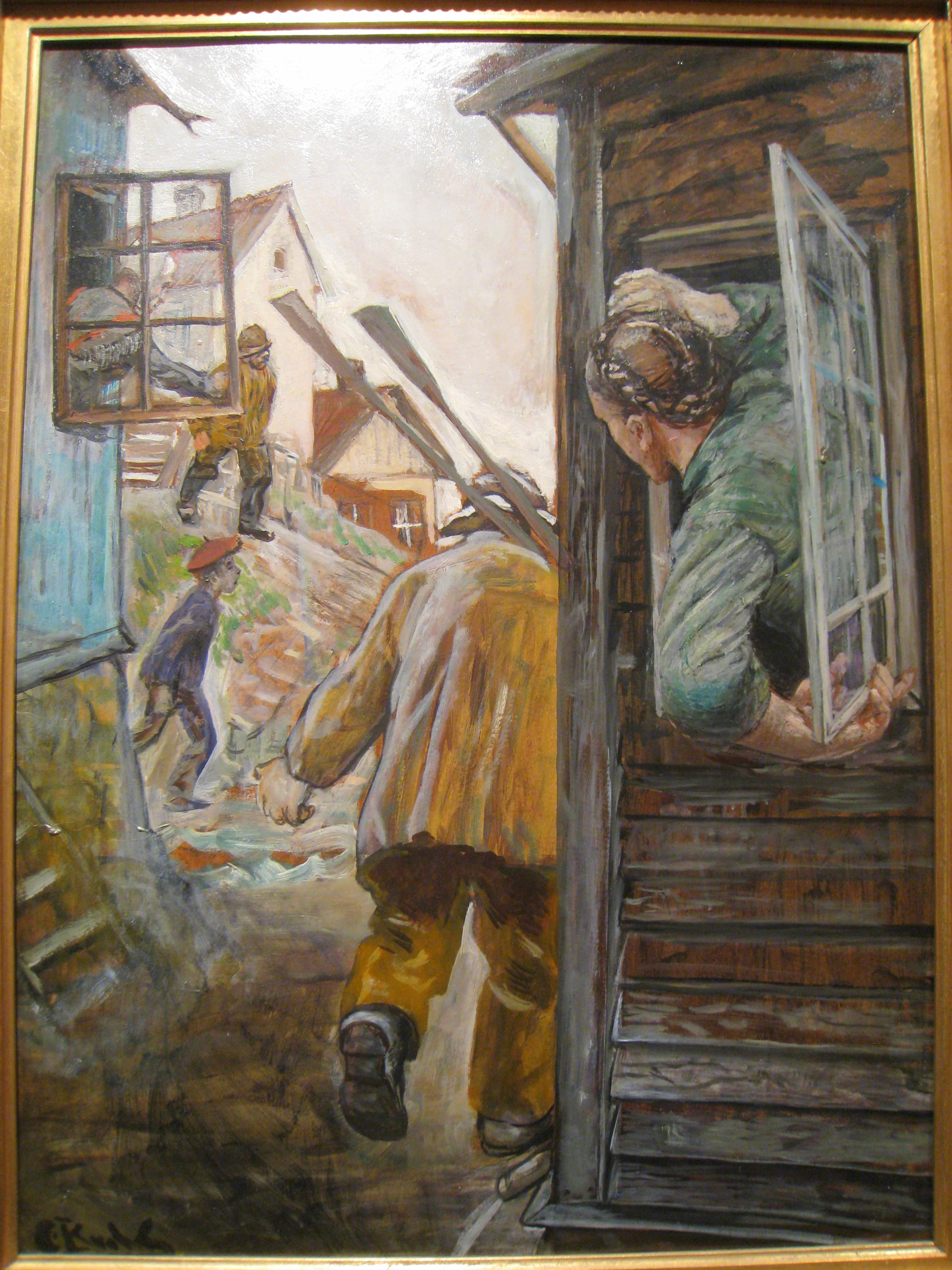
Silda Kommer (The herring are in)

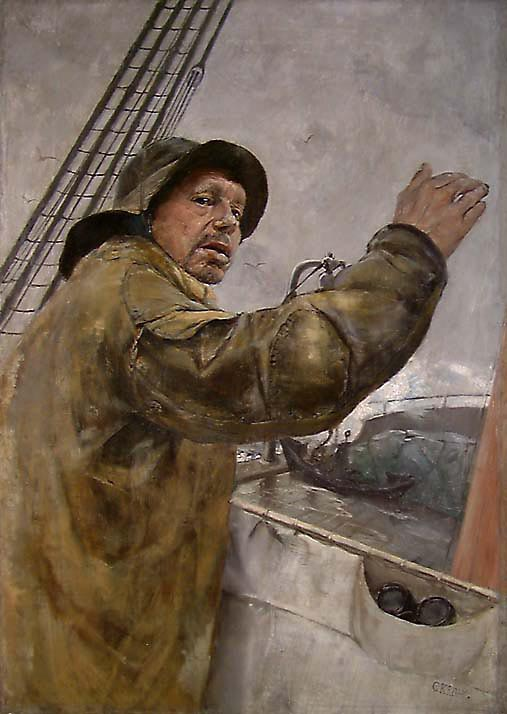
Babord litt (Port side, 1879)

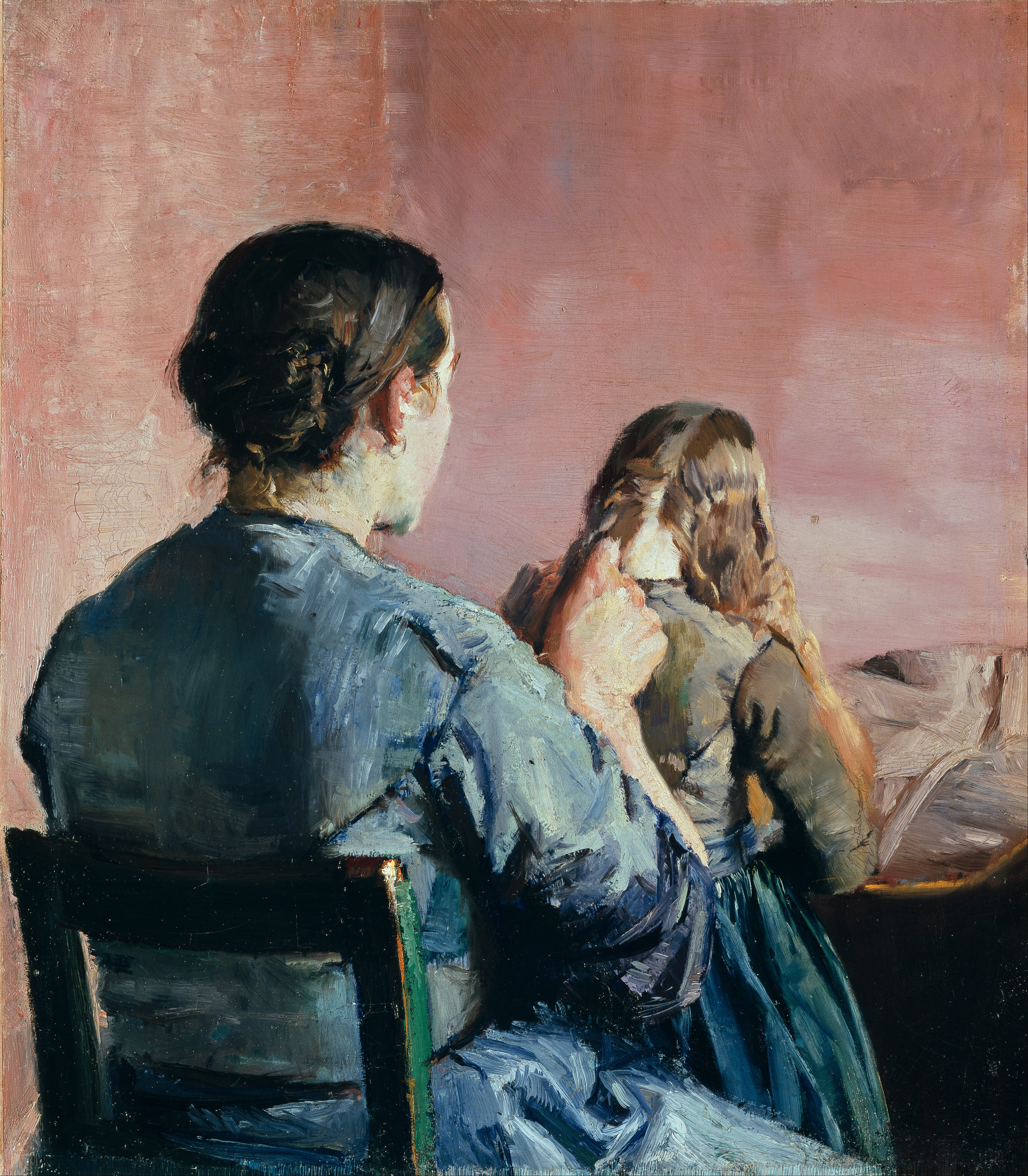
Håret flettes (The hair is being braided, 1882)

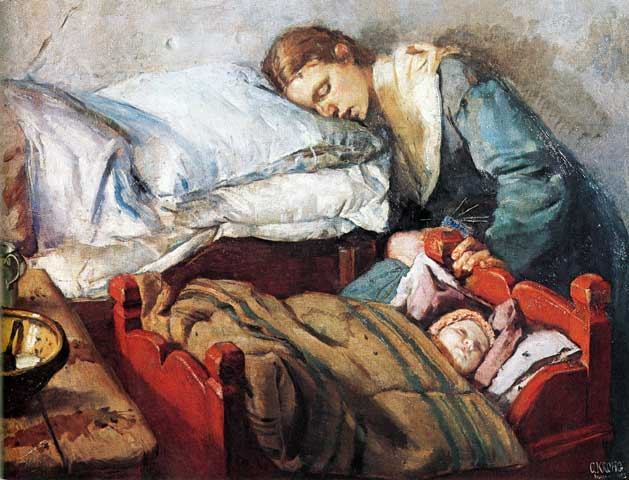
Sovende mor med barn (Sleeping mother with child, 1883)

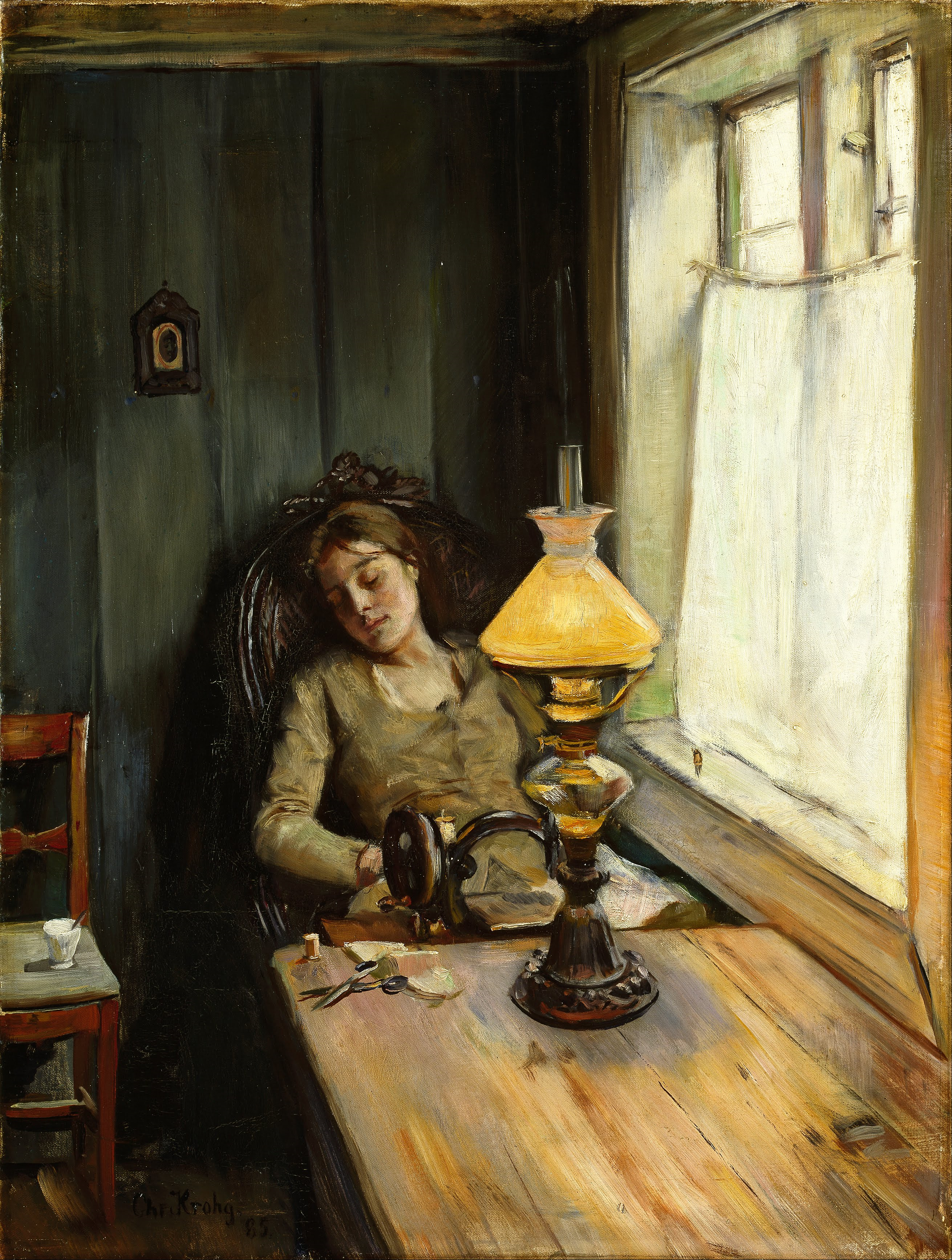
Trett (Tired, 1885)

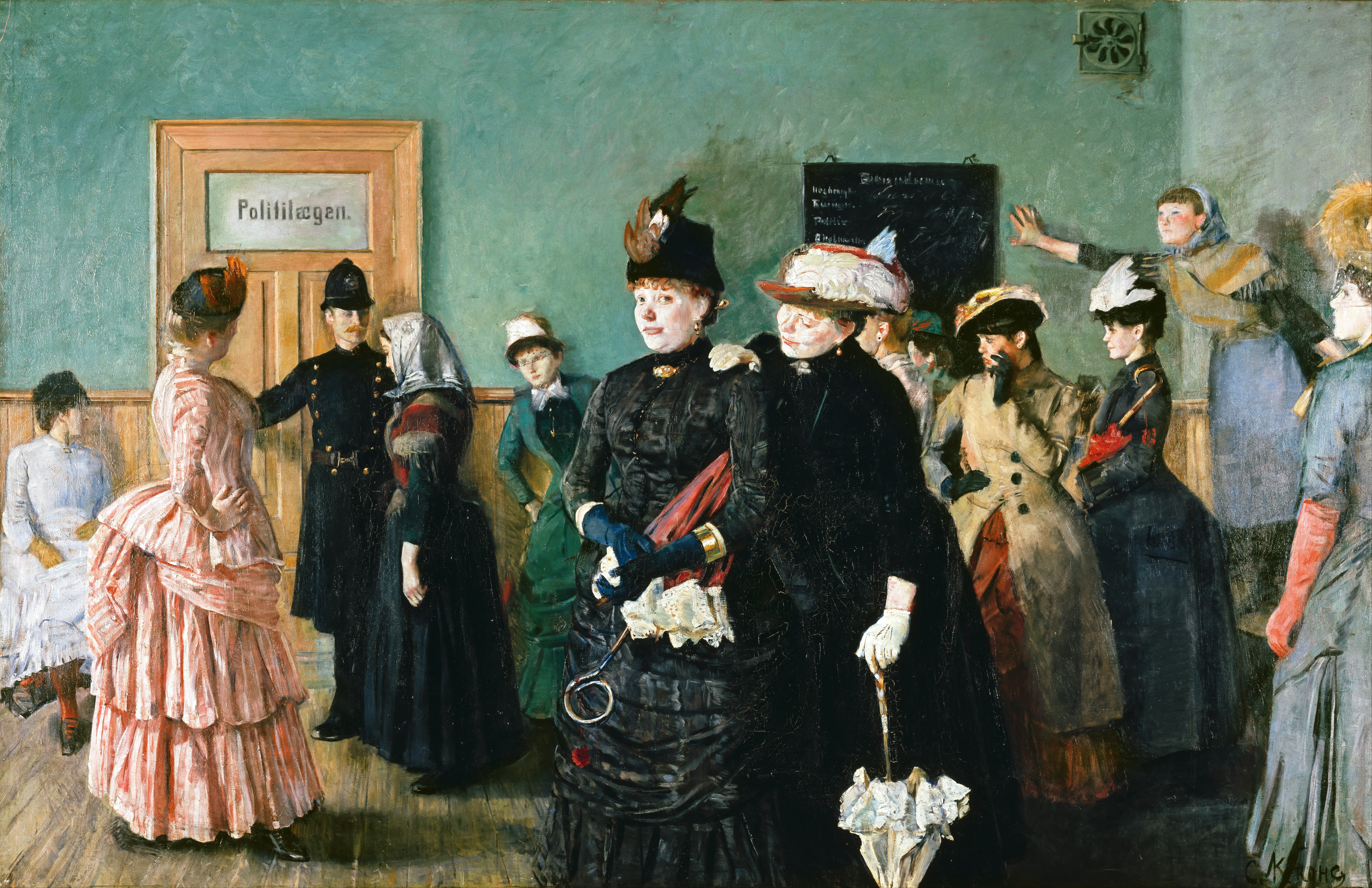
Albertine i politilægens venteværelse (Albertine at the Police Doctor's Waiting Room, 1885–87)

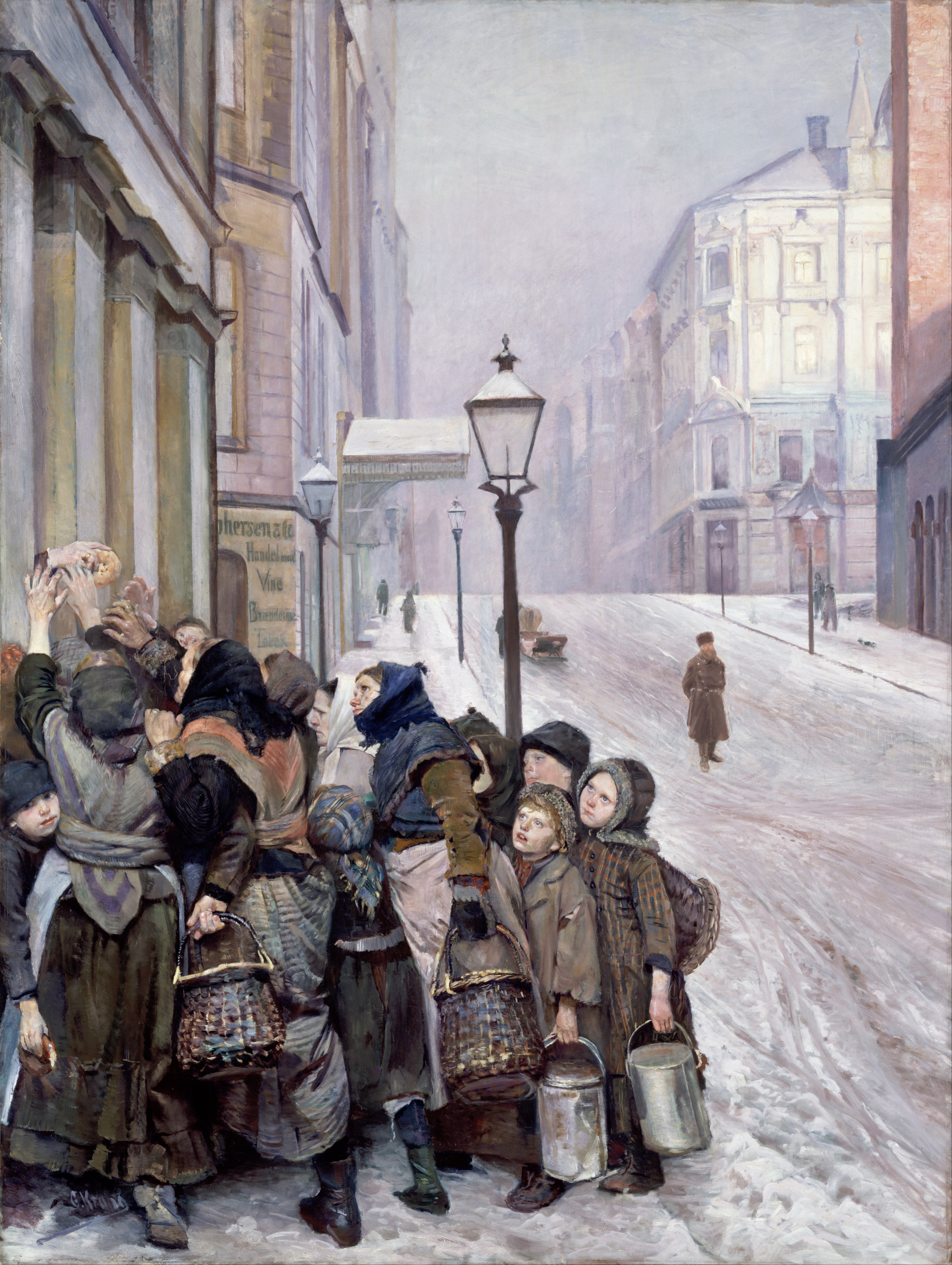
Kampen for tilværelsen (Struggle for existence, c. 1888–89)

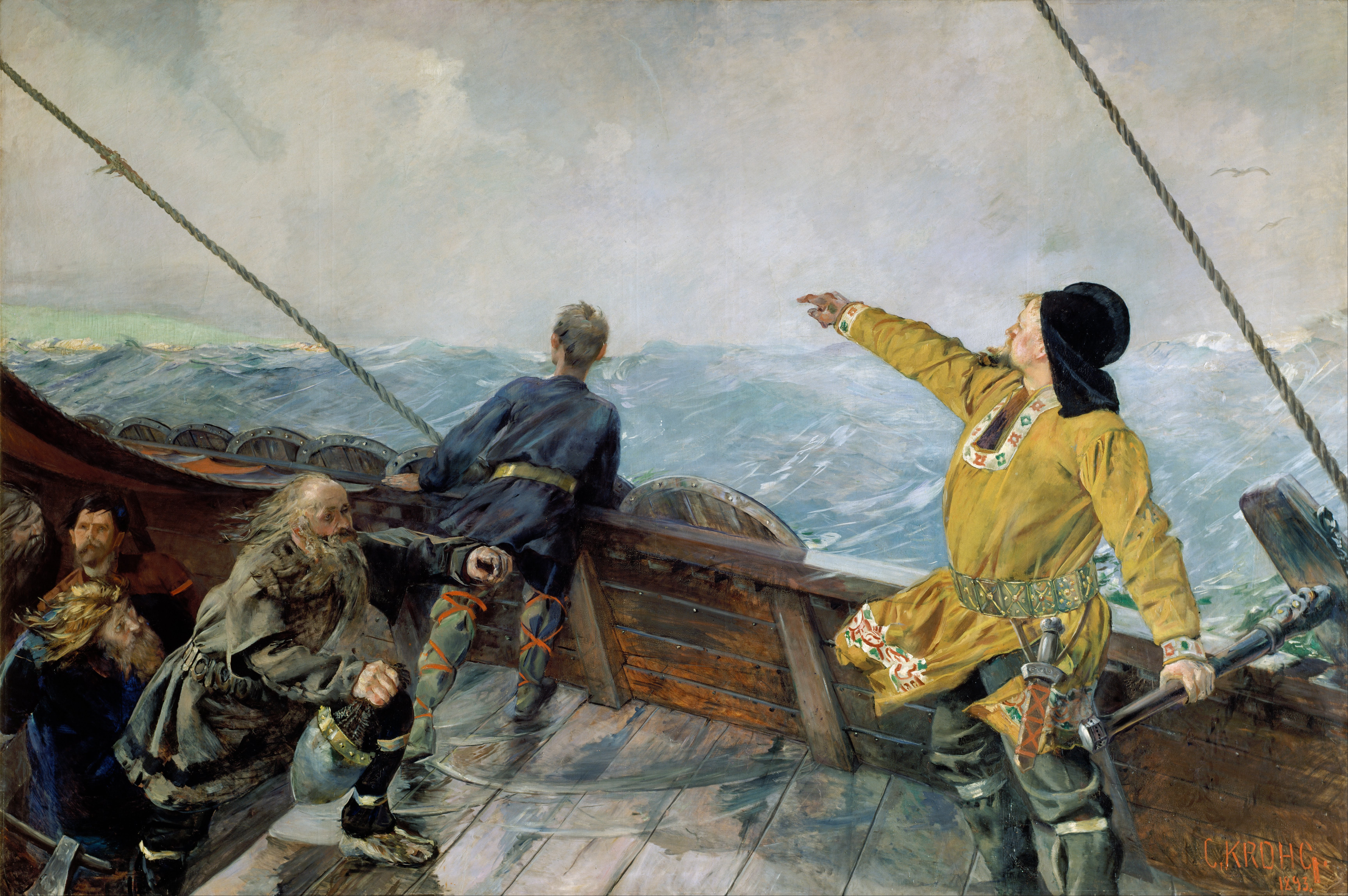
Leiv Eriksson oppdager Amerika (Leiv Eirikson discovering America, 1893)

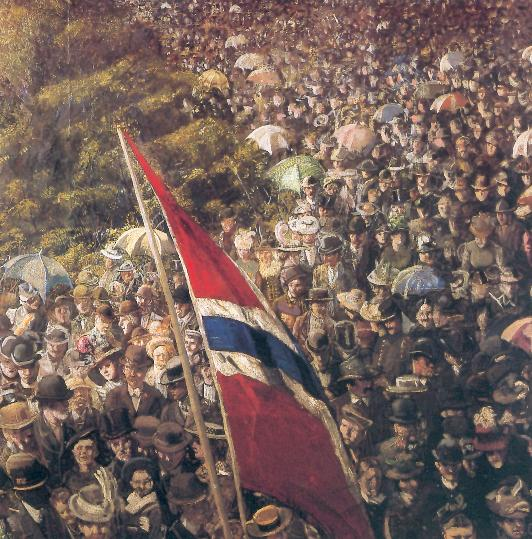
17 mai 1893 (May 17, 1893)

== Other sources ==
- Thue, Oscar (1997) Christian Krohg (Oaslo: Aschehoug) ISBN 978-8203221033
- Thue, Oscar (1971) Christian Krohgs portretter (Oslo: Gyldendal) ISBN 978-8205002401
- Bryne, Arvid (2009) Christian Krohg. Journalisten (Oslo: Unipub Forlag)ISBN 978-8274774452
