= Impressionisten =

Impressionisten ('The Impressionist') was a Norwegian periodical, published by people belonging to the Bohemianist group in Kristiania.

Impressionisten was first published in December 1886. The first editor-in-chief was Christian Krohg, and the most prolific contributor was Hans Jæger, although the latter was imprisoned during parts of the existence of the periodical. However, after a fresh start, the issues eventually became few and far between. The eighth issue came in February 1889, and contained the infamous Nine Bohemianist Commandments. The ninth and last issue was released in 1890.
