= Albertine in the Police Doctor's Waiting-Room =

Painting by Christian Krohg

- Albertine i politilægens venteværelse (Norwegian)
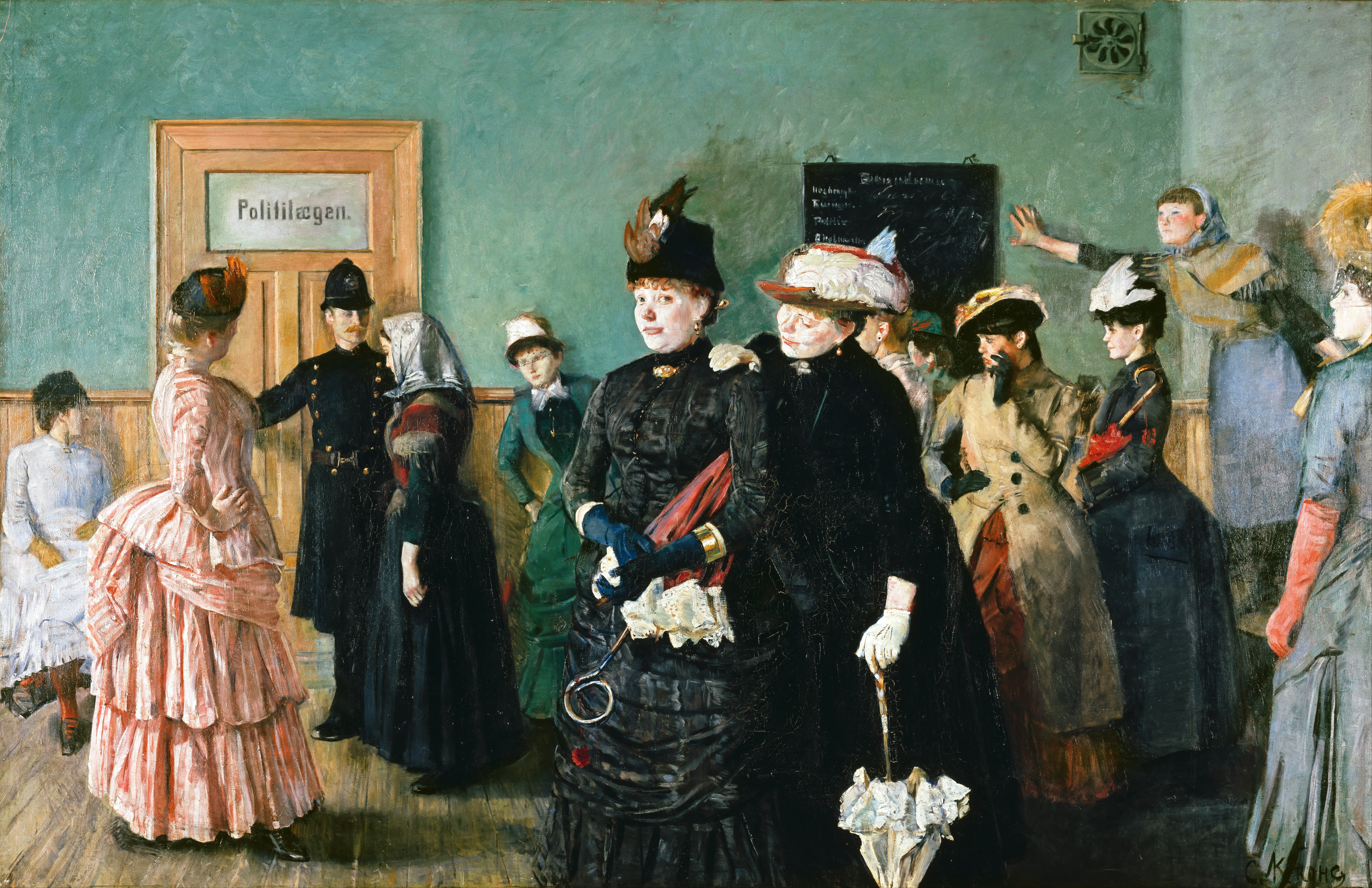
- Artist: Christian Krohg
- Year: 1887
- Medium: Oil on canvas
- Dimensions: 211 cm × 326 cm (83 in × 128 in)
- Location: National Museum of Art, Architecture and Design, Oslo

Albertine in the Police Doctor's Waiting-Room (Norwegian: Albertine i politilægens venteværelse) is a naturalist painting by the Norwegian artist Christian Krohg, from 1887, showing the scene in a medical waiting-room.

Albertine in the Police Doctor's Waiting-Room is regarded as Krohg's principal work as a social painter. The painting touched upon the taboo subject of sexual life, and led to a heated debate among his contemporaries. The format of the painting is unusually large, the figures in it being portrayed at full scale. The painting is held in the National Museum of Art, Architecture and Design, formerly the National Gallery, in Oslo.

== The painting ==
The painting depicts a scene in a police doctor's waiting-room. "Albertine" is the next person who will enter the examination room. She is dressed in a simple costume, in contrast to the other women in the room, who are dolled up in colorful dresses, typical of the prostitutes of the period.

== Ownership history ==
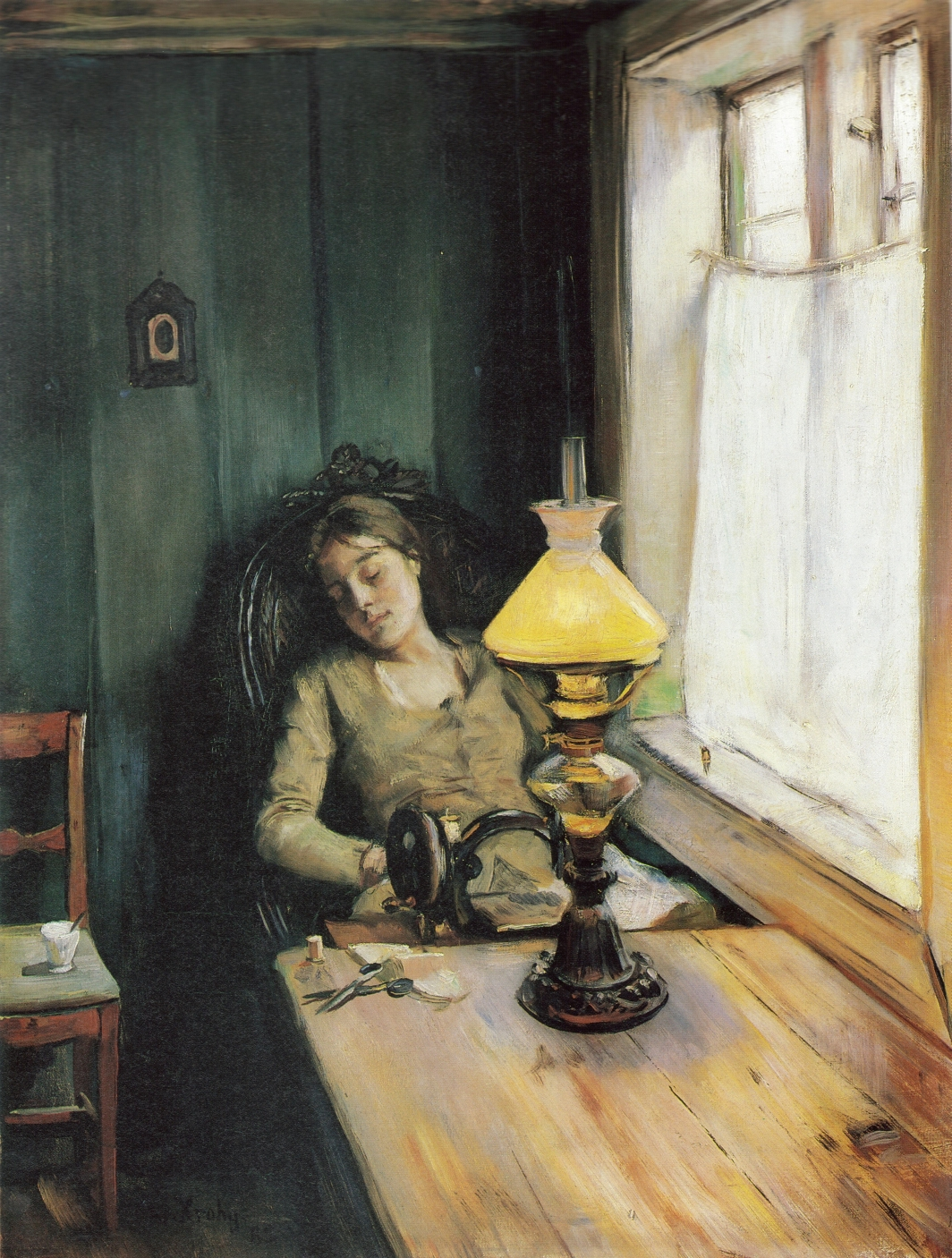
Trett (English: Tired) from 1885

The painting was placed in a "hut" (Norwegian holiday home built in wood, often rather large) for nearly twenty years, until it was eventually sold. In 1907 the buyer resold the painting to the National Gallery of Norway.

== Related works ==
Krohg had created several earlier paintings based on the fate of the unmarried seamstress "Albertine", who is eventually forced into prostitution by the social system of the time. Other related paintings are Daggry from 1880 (at Statens Museum for Kunst in Copenhagen), Sypiken from 1881 (at Göteborgs Konstmuseum), and Trett from 1885 (at the National Gallery in Oslo). He explored the same subject in his novel Albertine, written in 1886. The debate following the publishing and confiscation of the novel expedited the abolition of public prostitution in Norway.
