= Ulf Stridbeck =

Ulf Johan Stridbeck (born 5 December 1949) is a professor at the Department of Public Law in the Faculty of Law at the University of Oslo. His main areas are criminal law, criminal procedure and forensic psychology. In addition to being a lawyer he is also a sociologist. Originally from Sweden he received much of his academic training from the University of Gothenburg and Lund University.

In 2003, as part of its Plan of Action to Combat Trafficking in Women and Children the Justice Ministry investigated the situation in both the Netherlands (which had recently legalised brothels) and Sweden to better inform the debate, and concluded that neither approach would be appropriate at that point. The working group for this report was chaired by Professor Ulf Stridbeck.

== Bibliography ==
- Ulf Stridbeck and Alf Petter Høgberg: Hvitvasking (Money Laundering). Universitetsforlaget 2008 (ISBN 9788215010083)
- Ulf Stridbeck and Knut Erik Sæther: Gjenopptakelse av straffesaker (Resumption of Criminal Cases). Universitetsforlaget 2004. (ISBN 82-15-00561-6)
