= Per Hurum =

Norwegian sculptor

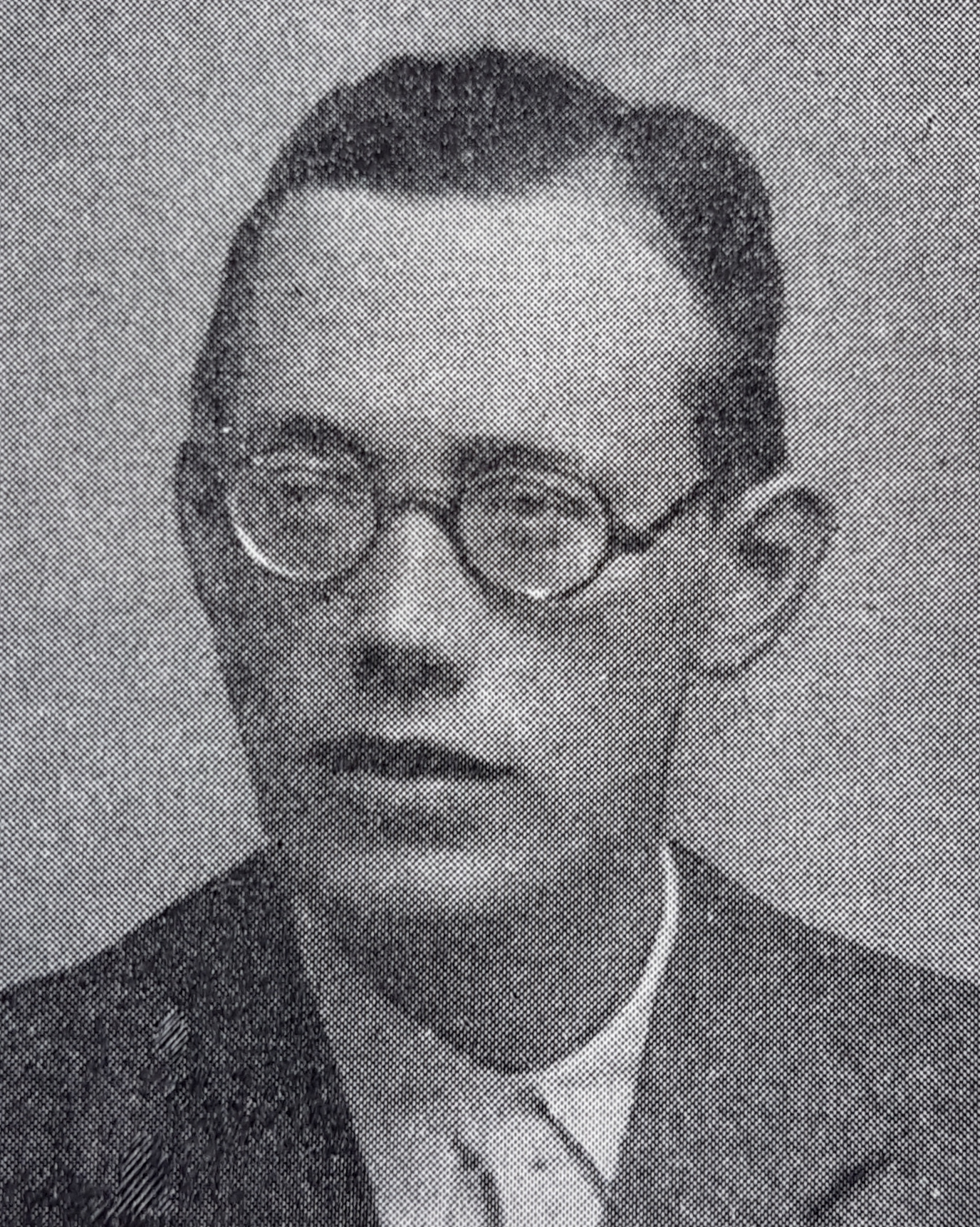
- Born: 2 June 1910; Kristiania, Norway
- Died: 5 December 1989 (aged 79)
- Known for: Sculpture
- Spouse: Asbjørg Borgfelt (m. 1937)
- Relatives: Hans Jørgen Hurum (brother)

Per Hurum (2 June 1910 – 5 December 1989) was a Norwegian sculptor.

== Biography ==
Hurum was born in Kristiania (now Oslo), Norway. He was the son of Hans Hurum (1869–1934) and Anna Ording (1876–1956). His brother was music critic Hans Jørgen Hurum (1906–2001). He graduated artium and first attended trade school. He was a student in the paint class at the Norwegian National Academy of Craft and Art Industry 1929–1930. He followed with one year studying drawing at Ateneum in Helsinki. He became a student of Halfdan Strøm 1931–32 and of Wilhelm Rasmussen 1932–1934.

He was awarded the Conrad Mohr's legacy (1938) and A.C. Houens fond (1946–47). He conducted a number of study trips including to Copenhagen (1935; 1947–48), Paris (1937) and Stockholm (1947–48). He also conducted trips to Germany, Italy, England and Greece.

He won first prize for the completion of several public works including Arbeidermonumentet at Youngstorget in Oslo (1937, prize divided by four other sculptors), decoration of Rådhusplassen in Oslo (1939, together with E. Lie), krigsmonumentet at Fredrikstad (1947) and the Christian Krohg Monument (1950–1960, together with Asbjørg Borgfelt). One of his most recognized works is the two piece grouping Mor og barn (bronze, 1939–1944) which was completed with Asbjørg Borgfelt at the City Hall Square in Oslo.

He received a State Art Salary from 1957 and was awarded the King's Medal of Merit (Kongens fortjenstmedalje) in gold.

== Personal life ==
In 1937 he married sculptor Asbjørg Borgfelt.
