= Helge Hurum =

Norwegian musician

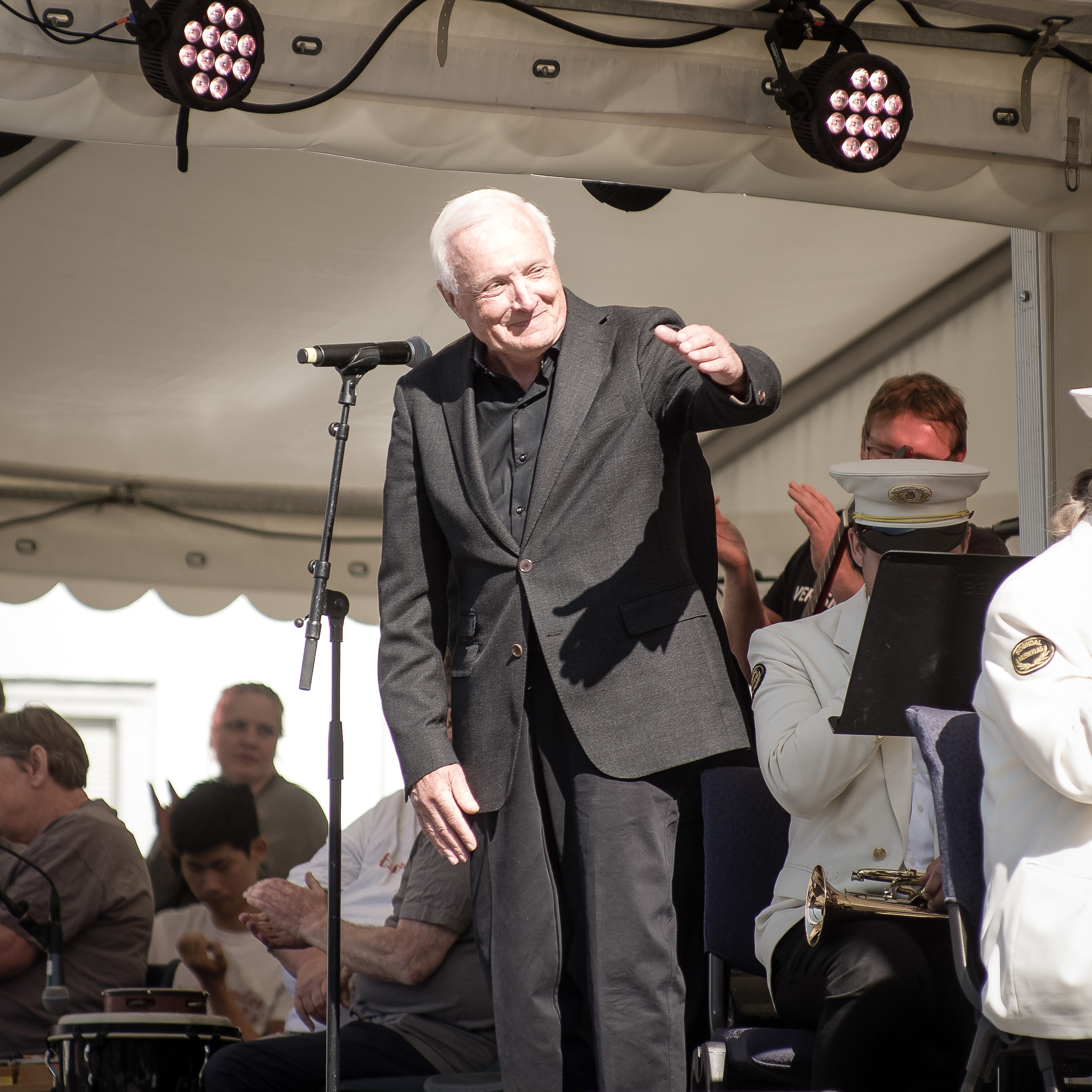
Helge Hurum in 2017

Helge Hurum (born 1 August 1936) is a Norwegian jazz musician, composer, arranger and musical director. Hurum has led several of Norway's key big bands, including the Oslo University Big Band (1969–74), Norway's Radio Big Band (1979–90), his own Helge Hurum Storband (1965–70), the EBU Big Band (1973), the Chateau Neuf Big Band and, in later years, the Oslo Big Band.

== Career ==
Hurum studied at the Norwegian Academy of Music, and has practiced as an autodidact contemporary composer with his works being performed by orchestras such as the Oslo Philharmonic Orchestra (Concentus ad Libitum, 1979) and a number of marching bands. Hurum's works Fata Morgana (1984) and Canto for Solo Piccolo and String Quartet (1985) were bestowed with NOPA Work of the Year Awards. His works Vind fer Vide and Blåsere i høyfjellet received EBU first prizes, while his Peer Gynt Suite was performed at the opening ceremony for the 1994 Winter Olympic Games in Lillehammer. Hurum's list of works also includes a number of chamber music pieces for woodwinds and brass.

Hurum has contributed to a number of outings and released two solo albums, Opus (1982) and Fata Morgana (1987). He has also performed his own compositions with his ensembles at the Molde and Kongsberg Jazz festivals, as well as at the 1971 Montreux Jazz Festival with Clark Terry. In 1973, Hurum led the EBU Big Band, performing his commissioned work This Time Oslo.

In addition to a substantial number of compositions for jazz ensembles, Hurum has composed a number of major works. In 1976, he composed Tre akter for marching band, a test piece for the Norwegian Marching Band Championships. Hurum's jazz mass Hear Thou Our Prayr was commissioned by O.R Antonsen at the Toneheim Folk High School and premiered by UK vocal outfit Swingle Singers in 1978. Concentus ad libitum for jazz quintet and symphony orchestra, premiered by the Oslo Philharmonic Orchestra and Jan Garbarek in 1979 is also viewed as one of Hurum's key works.

== Production ==
=== Selected works ===
- Sulitjelma fantasi (2005)
- Festiva (2001)
- Herkomst : Skisser fra Biscopsrud (1999)
- Balholm (1996)
- Jazz på Svartaberg (1996)
- Skiflyvermarsj : Vikersund (1995)
- Frudalssleppet (1994)
- Hedemarkstoner (1994)
- Brass Scener (1989)
- Norske Motiver (1988)
- Our Day of Praise is Done (1986)
- Canto : Solo for piccolo & string quartet (1985)
- Capriccio & Canzone (1984)
- Concita (1984)
- Fata Morgana (1984)
- Intermezzo Date (1983)
- Ballade for Solo E♭ Alto Saxophone and Band (1983)
- Fata morgana (1983)
- Mosaikk : Suite for klarinettkor (1983)
- Norske bilder (1981)
- Eventus : II. Sonus (1981)
- Eventus : III. Sulitjelma fantasi (1981)
- Concentus ad libitum (1979)
- Fluxo (1978)
- Hear Thou our Prayr' (1978)
- Klarinettkontraster (1976)
- Divertimento : Klarinettkvartett (1975)

=== Discography ===
- Jan Berger, Ego Trip (2009)
- Helge Hurum, Spectre – The Unreleased Works (2007)
- HM Kongens Gardes Musikkorps, HM Kongens Garde - 150th Anniversary - Vol. 1 k (2006)
- Stellar Voyage - Rare Rock Grooves & Fusion From Norway (2004)
- HM Kongens Gardes Musikkorps, Rhythm, Precision and Elegance (2002)
- Bodil Niska, First Song (2000)
- Odd R. Antonsen Symphonic Band, Vikingskipet - Hamar Olympic Hall (1995)
- Lysejordet Skoles Musikkorps, 15 År med Lysejordet Skoles Musikkorps (1993)
- OPUS 82, Vind fer vide (1992)
- Åsnes Hornmusikk (1991)
- Oslo Concert Band, Marches and Light Music from Norway (1989)
- Helge Hurum, Fata Morgana/Intim Impromptu (1987)
- Magni Wentzel, Sofies Plass (1983)
- HM Kongens Gardes Musikkorps, In Concert (1979)
