= Bergen Teacher Training College =

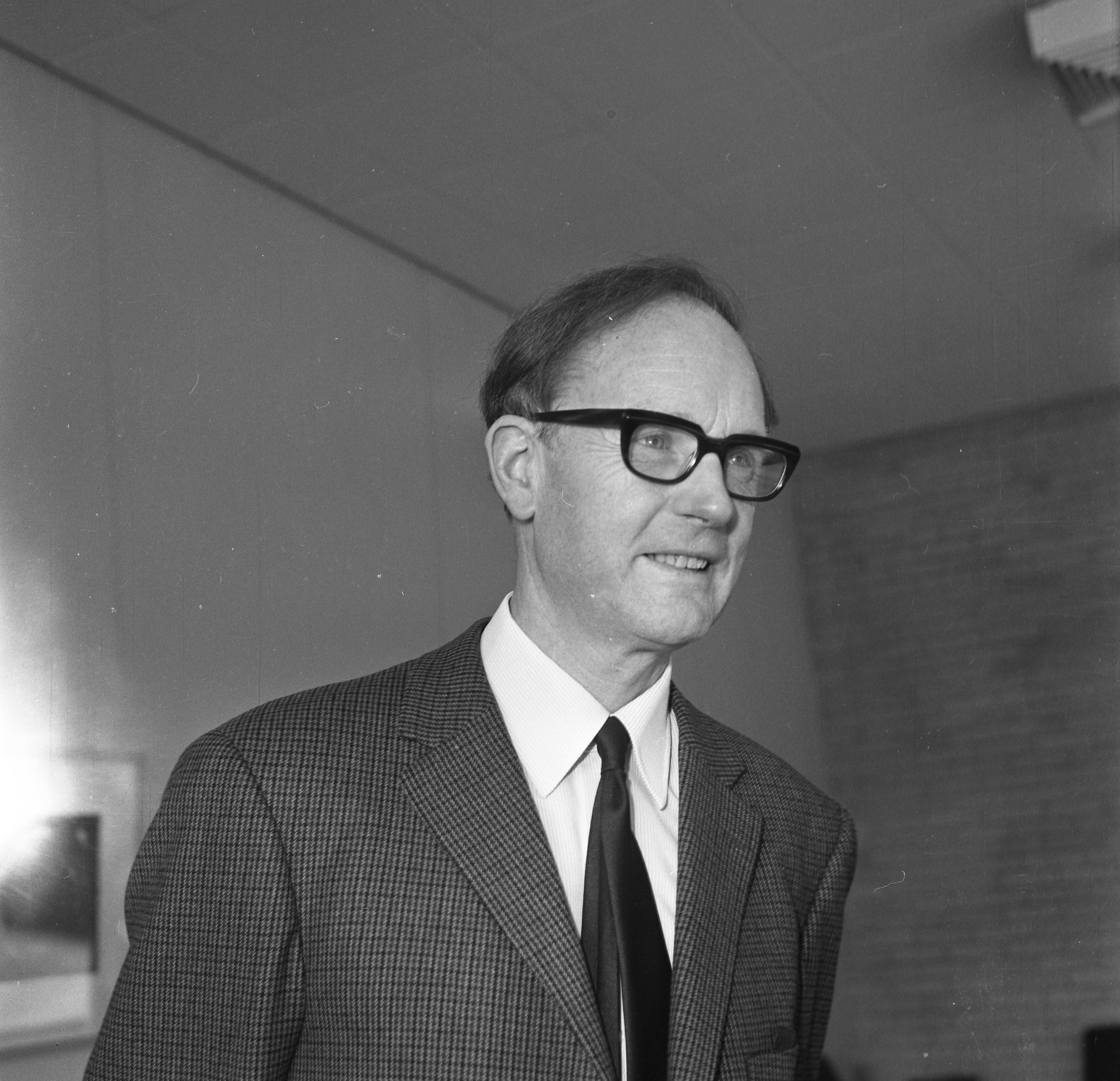
Ivar Benum, the first chancellor of Bergen Teacher Training College.

Bergen Teacher Training College (Norwegian: Bergen lærerhøgskole) was a tertiary education institution for training teachers in Bergen, Norway.

The school was established in 1953 under the name Statens lærerskoleklasser i Bergen (Bergen State Teacher Training School). The school was renamed Bergen offentlige lærerskole (Bergen Public Teacher Training School) in 1962. In 1965, the school acquired its own premises in Landås. The school was again renamed Bergen lærerskole (Bergen Teacher Training School) in 1967. Bergen Preschool Teacher School (Barnevernsskolen i Bergen), which was established in 1948, became part of the school in 1972, and the following year the State Home Economics Teacher Training College (Statens lærerskole i heimkunnskap), which had been established in 1950, was also incorporated into the school. In 1981, the school was once again renamed and became Bergen lærerhøgskole. In 1994, the school was incorporated into Bergen University College.

The pianist Ivar Benum served as the college's first chancellor, and he contributed to the institution developing its music program.
