= Hans Jørgen Hurum =

Norwegian music critic

Hans Jørgen Hurum (20 May 1906 – 13 May 2001) was a Norwegian music critic and non-fiction writer. He graduated as cand.jur. in 1929. He was a music critic for the newspaper Norges Handels- og Sjøfartstidende from 1932 to 1939, and for Aftenposten from 1946 to 1982.

== Selected works ==
- Franske døgn. 1942.
- Musikken under okkupasjonen. 1946.
- I Mozarts verden. 1955.
- I Edvard Griegs verden. 1959.
- Jeg tviler. 1994.
