= Prostitution in Morocco =

Although prostitution in Morocco has been illegal since the 1970s it still exists. In 2015 the Moroccan Health Ministry estimated there were 50,000 prostitutes in Morocco, the majority in the Marrakech area. Prostitutes tend to be Moroccan women from lower socioeconomic backgrounds as well as migrants from sub-Saharan Africa, many of whom are victims of human trafficking UNAIDS estimated the figure at 75,000 in 2016.

Many children are vulnerable as adoption laws in Morocco are very rigid and difficult. Morocco's increasing reputation for attracting foreign pedophiles made it sign various international treaties to deal with the problem. Male prostitution exists but is stigmatised. Health services for Moroccan sex workers include OPALS, an organisation promoting treatments for HIV/AIDS.

Traditionally, women's roles in North African society have been rigidly defined, particularly so with increasing Islamification. Yet the economic and social realities often provide few alternatives to many Moroccan women, and the area has increasingly been seen as permissive to prostitution.

== French colonial rule ==
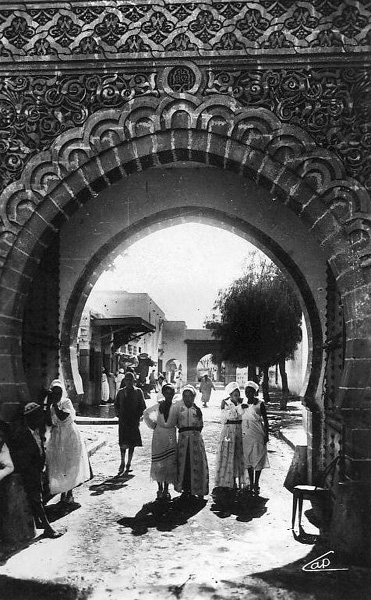
Entrance to the Bousbir in Casablanca early 20th century

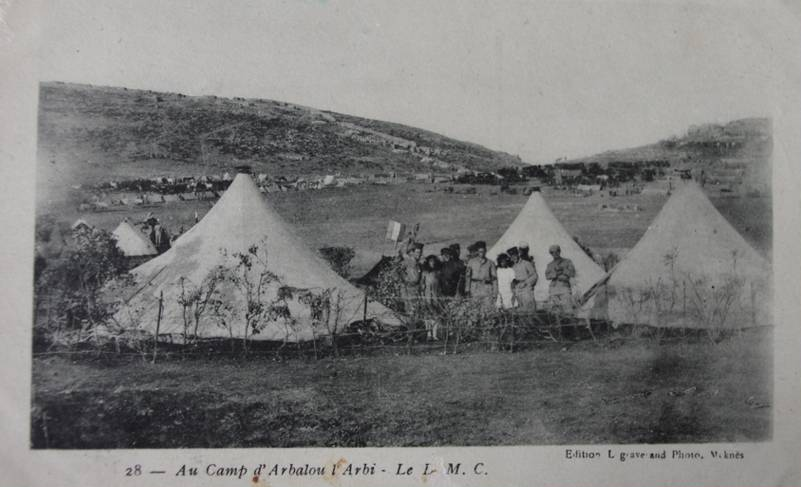
A BMC in Morocco in the 1920s

Historically, prostitution was connected to slavery in Morocco. The Islamic Law formally prohibited prostitution. However, since the principle of concubinage in Islam in Islamic Law allowed a man to have sexual intercourse with his female slave, prostitution in the Islamic world was commonly practiced by a pimp selling his female slave on the slave market to a client, who was then allowed to have sex with her as her new owner; the client would then cancel his purchase and return the slave to her pimp on the pretext of discontent, which was a legal and accepted method for prostitution in the Islamic world.

Many authors such as Christelle Taraud have attributed the increase in prostitution during the French colonial period to the abolition of slavery in Morocco. The colonial French authorities pursued an anti slavery policy, and between the second quarter of the 20th century and the 1950s, the slaves in Morocco where gradually manumitted. In this time period, most slaves in Morocco where female house slaves, who were commonly used as domestic servants and sexually exploited in accordance with concubinage in Islam, and many destitute former female slaves, are claimed to have turned to prostitution to survive after manumission.

During French colonial rule (1912–1956) prostitution was regulated. The authorities were concerned about the spread of STIs, particularly syphilis, amongst the troops stationed in the colony. "Quartiers réservés" (red-light districts) were set up in several cities, where prostitution was permitted, notably in Bousbir in Casablanca.

Within these quartiers réservés, prostitutes had to be registered and have mandatory regular health checks. They had to carry their registration card with them at all times and travel outside the quarter was only allowed by permit.

Outside these quarters, maisons de tolérance (brothels) were set up for the use of Europeans. The prostitutes in these maisons were subject to the same regulation.

Some prostitutes worked outside the quartiers réservés. There was frequent police action against these clandestines and they were forced to take a medical test. Those, who were healthy received a warning. If they had a sexually transmitted infection, they were taken to a hospital. On release from the hospital, they were taken to the quartiers réservés. Women who received three warnings were forcibly taken to the quartiers réservés.

Where troops were stationed away from the cities, bordels militaires de campagne (mobile brothels) were set up for the soldiers.

== Much Loved ==
Much Loved is a 2015 French–Moroccan film about the prostitution scene in Marrakesh. The film tells about the lives of four prostitutes and shows their exploitation by pimps and the corruption of the police.

The film was banned in Morocco for its "contempt for moral values and the Moroccan woman". The leading actress, Loubna Abidar, received death threats and in November 2015, she was violently attacked in Casablanca and left the country for France soon after. Religious authorities condemned the film for portraying a negative image of Morocco, with its supporting of extramarital sex and sympathy for homosexuals.

== Chikhat ==
Chikhat (Arabic شيخة shīkha) is a Moroccan term for singers, musicians, dancers and prostitutes

Traditionally female entertainers were also prostitutes. Often they were part of a traveling show. In modern times performers of the Chikhat dance are generally not prostitutes, but wedding dancers.

== Sex trafficking ==
Morocco is a source, destination, and transit country for women and children subjected to sex trafficking. According to a November 2015 study conducted by the Moroccan government, with support by an international organization, children are exploited in sex trafficking. The 2015 study also found that some Moroccan women are forced into prostitution in Morocco by members of their families or other intermediaries.

Some female undocumented migrants, primarily from Sub-Saharan Africa and a small but growing number from South Asia, are coerced into prostitution. Criminal networks operating in Oujda on the Algerian border and in the northern coastal town of Nador force undocumented migrant women into prostitution. Some female migrants, particularly Nigerians, who transit through Oujda are forced into prostitution once they reach Europe. International organizations, local NGOs, and migrants report unaccompanied children and women from Cote d’Ivoire, Democratic Republic of the Congo, Nigeria, and Cameroon are highly vulnerable to sex trafficking in Morocco. Some reports suggest Cameroonian and Nigerian networks force women into prostitution by threatening the victims and their families; the victims are typically the same nationality as the traffickers.

Moroccan women and children are exploited in sex trafficking, primarily in Europe and the Middle East. Moroccan women forced into prostitution abroad experience restrictions on movement, threats, and emotional and physical abuse.

The United States Department of State Office to Monitor and Combat Trafficking in Persons ranks Morocco as a 'Tier 2' country.

== See also ==
- Bordel militaire de campagne
- Health in Morocco
