= House of Photography of Marrakesh =

Photography museum in Marrakesh, Morocco

The House of Photography of Marrakesh, also known by its French name Maison de la Photographie, is located in the historic medina of Marrakesh, Morocco. It opened in April 2009, with a collection of photographs spanning from the 1870s to the 1950s.

== History ==
The House of Photography opened in a renovated funduq (an inn for merchants and travellers). This cultural venue was established by Patrick Manac’h and Hamid Mergani as a place where old photographs taken in Morocco could be shown to the public. The museum opened in 2009.

== The collection ==
Although it started with a collection of a few thousand, the House of Photography now has a collection of around 10,000 documents and photographs, covering the period 1870–1960. It highlights the origins of photography in Morocco, with works by the early photographers who worked there, including George Washington Wilson, A. Cavilla and Marcelin Flandrin.

The collection includes rare views of Morocco, through pictures of the archaeological site of Volubilis (photographs by Henri de La Martinière), Moroccan landscapes (photographs by J. Belin), and important architectural complexes and casbahs. Portraits are given prominence, including those by H. Regnault (1870), Adolf de Meyer (Camera Work), and J. Robichez.

The collection of the House of Photography represents various historical and cultural aspects of Morocco, such as Berber culture, which is portrayed in photographs and the first colour documentary film in Morocco by Daniel Chicault, from 1957 on the Berber tribes of the High Atlas.

The collection also comprises a large series of (photographic plates) taken by anonymous photographers and travellers on their Grand Tour of Morocco.

== Activities ==
The House of Photography holds exhibitions of photos from its collection on different themes, which change every six months. It is also a research centre offering teachers and students information on the history and heritage of Morocco, as well as an educational venue open to schools.
