= Bordel militaire de campagne =

French military brothels

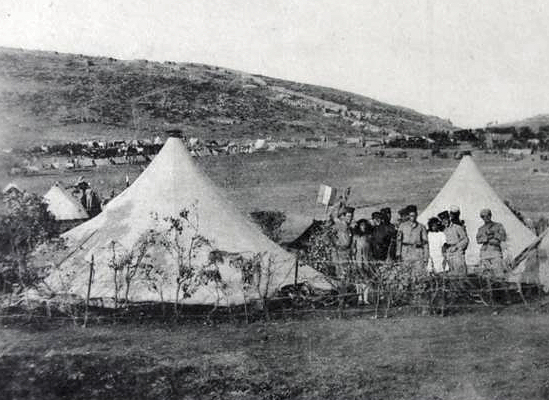
A BMC in Morocco in the 1920s

Bordels militaires de campagne ("military field brothels", abbreviated BMC) were mobile brothels used during World War I, World War II and the First Indochina War to supply prostitution services to French soldiers fighting in areas where brothels were unusual, such as at the front line or in isolated garrisons. The BMCs were significant drivers towards the creation of prostitution regulations within the French army.

These mobile brothels were, in some cases, officially organised by the army. They consisted of large trailer trucks in which up to ten women would work. The first references to these BMCs were in World War I, and they are noted particularly in the Indochina War and the Algerian War.

Subsequently, only the Foreign Legion still used them and closed the last BMC on French soil, in French Guiana, in 1995. The BMC in Djibouti was still operating until 2003.

== History ==
It is said that the provision of brothels to soldiers was started during the Third Crusade by Philip II of France. According to tradition he was so shocked by the extent of sodomy and rapes committed by the Crusaders that he arranged for a full boat of "girls of joy" to be sent from France. The first BMCs probably appeared during the period of military control of Algeria (1830–1870), following its conquest by the French army. The BMCs remained limited to the army in Africa until the First World War.

They then arrived in France, where Indigenous units from the colonies arrived. The military command did not want Indigenous soldiers to have sex with local women for racist and classist reasons, but also to prevent the troops from getting infected by venereal diseases, such as syphilis, which was not curable at the time (penicillin was only available from 1944). Despite this, four years of war saw the infection of 400,000 men.

Initially, no official designation was given to the BMCs. The acronym first appeared in the 1920s with the regulation of signs in the French army, and from then on, BMCs were mentioned in military documents.

Military officials actively provided prostitutes for their troops. The "association des maitres et maitresses d'hôtels meublés de France et des colonies" played an almost official co-ordinating role. It was governed by a law of 1 July 1901, located at 73 rue de Nazareth, Paris. The prostitutes were volunteers.

The military brothels multiplied during the interwar period, as almost every town with a garrison or a regiment had a BMC. During the colonial wars, the organisation and attendance of BMC was public knowledge and encouraged by the army, especially in Indochina and Algeria ("the candy box"). In France, brothels were prohibited by "Loi Marthe Richard" in 1946. However, in 1947, the Ministry of the Armed Forces authorised the continued use of BMCs for North African units while stationed in Metropolitan France, the prostitutes for these BMCs coming from Algeria.

BMCs were generally mobile and temporary and should be distinguished from "reserved areas" close to permanent garrisons, such as Bousbir de Casablanca.

French literature has several times mentioned the "Buffalo Park", a BMC in Saigon. In the Indochina War, the French used women from the Ouled Naïl tribe of the highlands of Algeria. BMCs were known to have a significant role in the spread of sexually transmitted diseases and were an avenue of attack by female Viet Minh sympathizers. There was a vast BMC in Saigon known as "the park of the buffaloes", and in January 1954, a BMC containing Vietnamese and Algerian prostitutes was flown to Dien Bien Phu. Here, the prostitutes became nursing assistants for the French garrison during the siege, However, they were sent for re-education by the Viet Minh after the garrison fell.

== Closure ==
The last BMC in France, that of the Foreign Legion 2nd Foreign Parachute Regiment in Calvi, Corsica was closed in 1978. The last BMC on French territory, that of the Legion in Kourou, French Guiana closed in 1995, following a complaint by a Brazilian pimp for unfair competition. Outside of the French territories, the Foreign Legion still had a BMC in the Republic of Djibouti until 2003.

== In film ==
- In the film RAS (1973), directed by Yves Boisset, about the war in Algeria, a sequence shows the arrival of a BMC and its use by the soldiers.
- Stéphane Benhamou's 2013 documentary film, Putains de guerre, contains many sequences and testimonials on BMC, especially in Indochina.

== See also ==
- Special Comfort Facility Association - Japanese brothels, post-World War II
- Western princess - prostitutes in South Korea, post World War II
- The Bousbir - a dedicated brothel district of Casablanca, built to service French colonial soldiers

== Bibliography ==
- Benoît, Christian (2013). de Taillac, Pierre (ed.). Le soldat et la putain [The Soldier and the Whore]. Taillac. ISBN 9782364450219. ASIN 2364450217.
