= Slavery in Morocco =

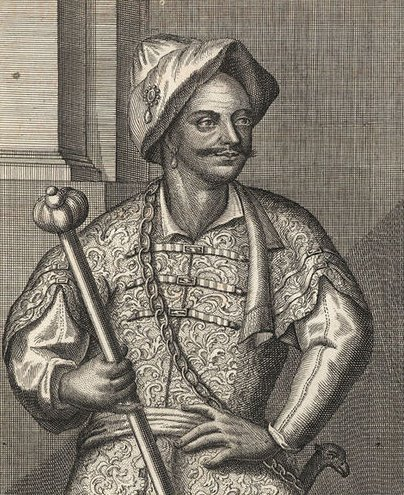
Ismail Ibn Sharif, known to have an unusually large harem of slave concubines as well as a slave army.

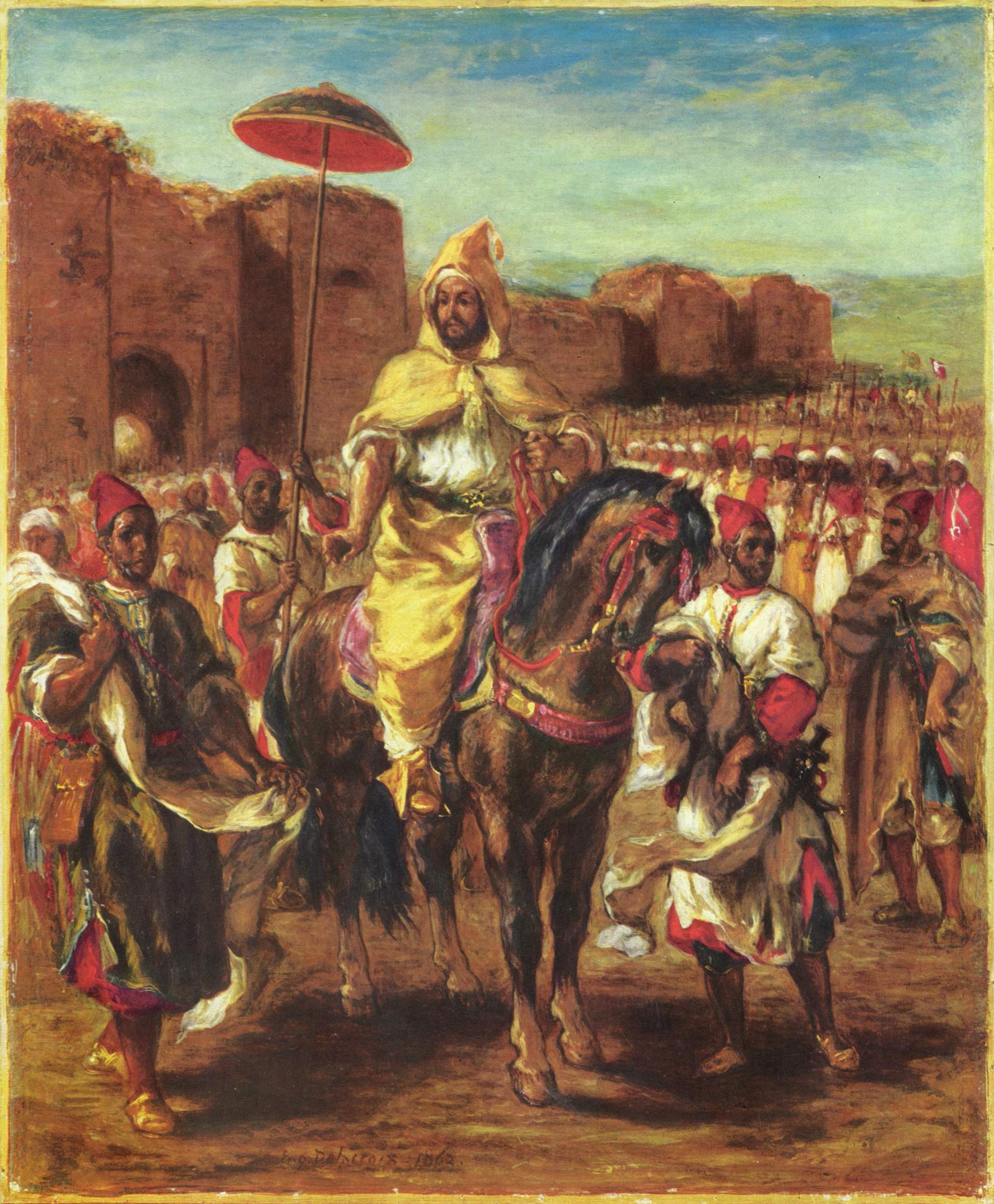
Eugène Ferdinand Victor Delacroix 044

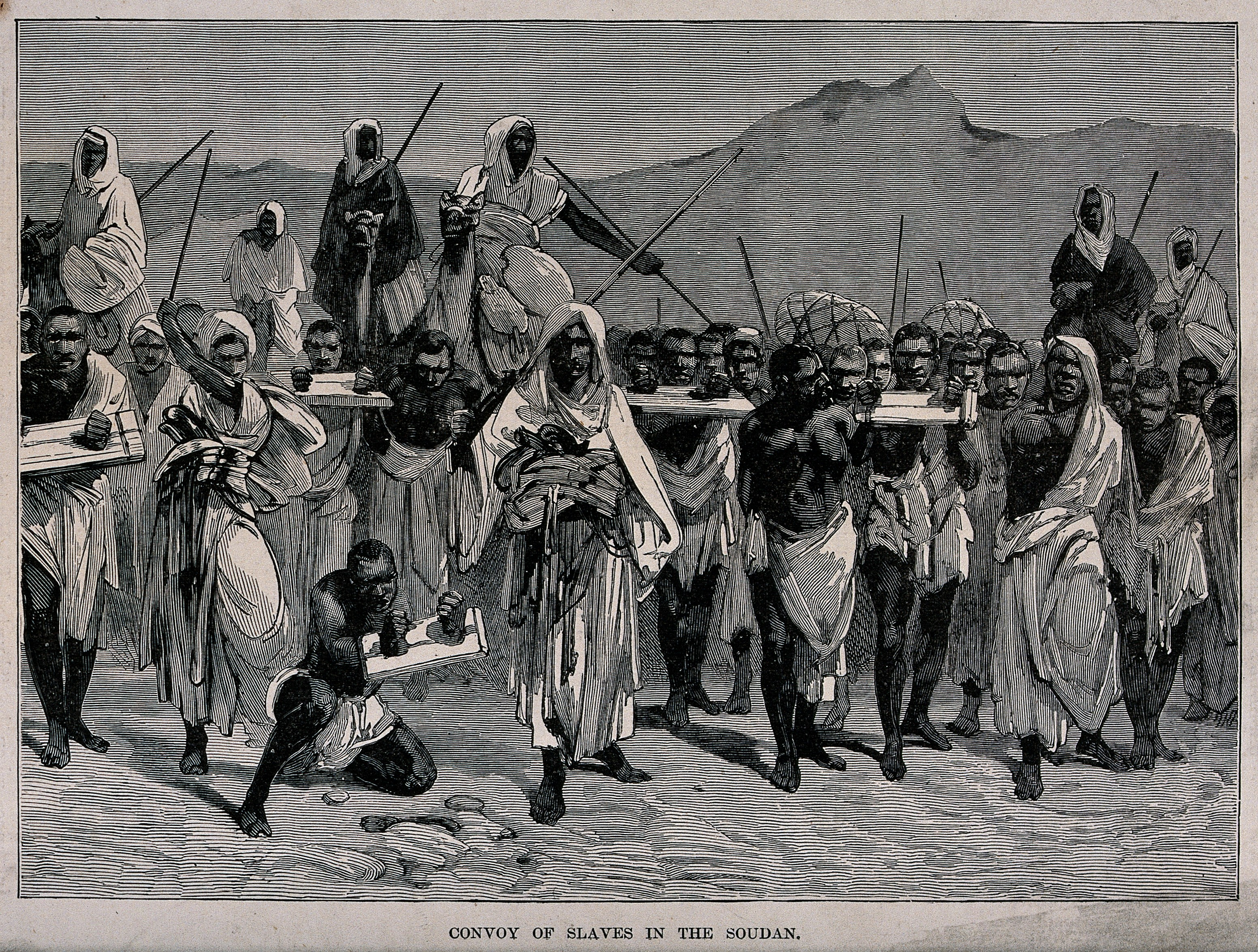
A depiction of slaves being transported across the Sahara desert

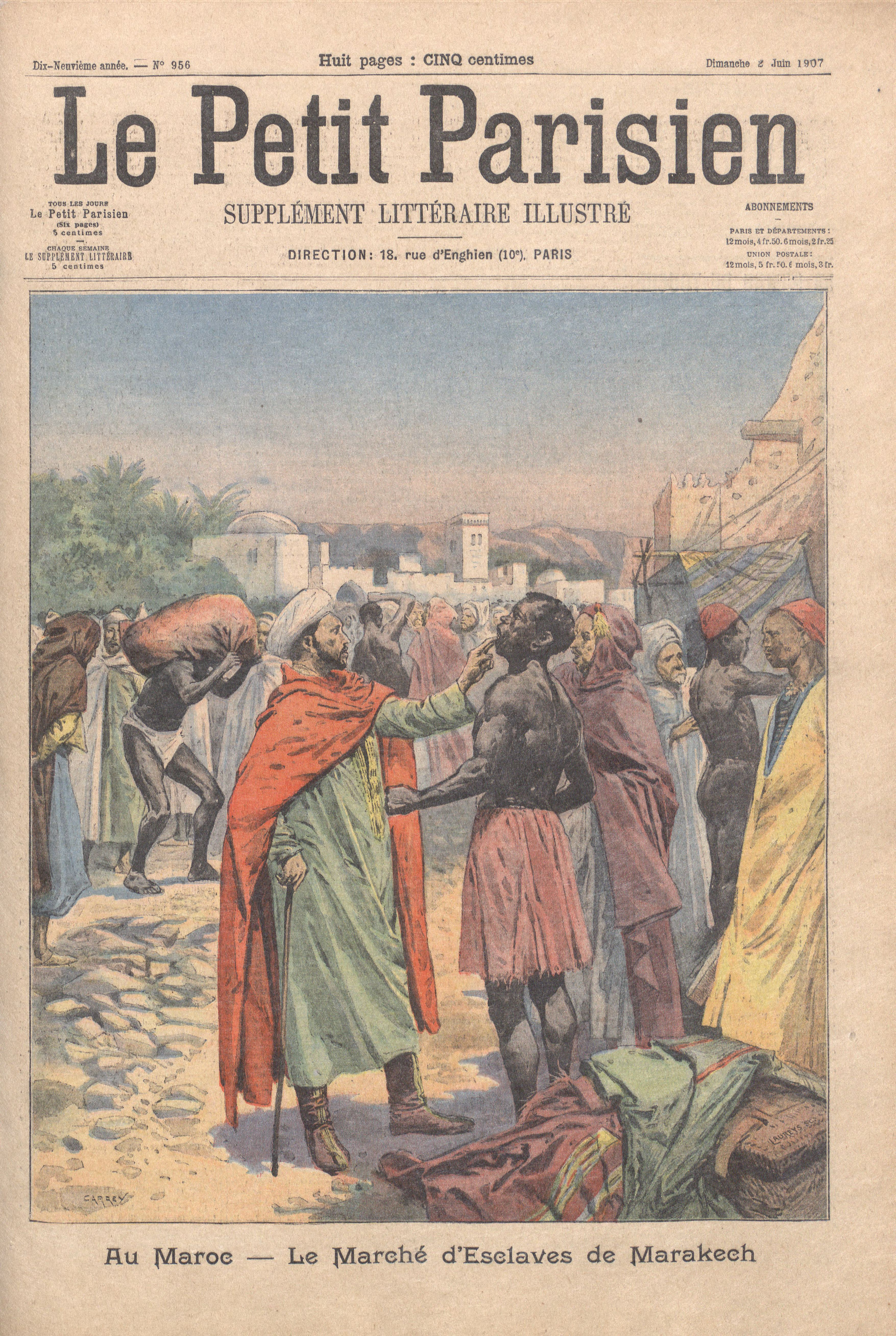
The Slave Market of Marrakesh as depicted on the cover of Le Petit Parisien of June 2, 1907.

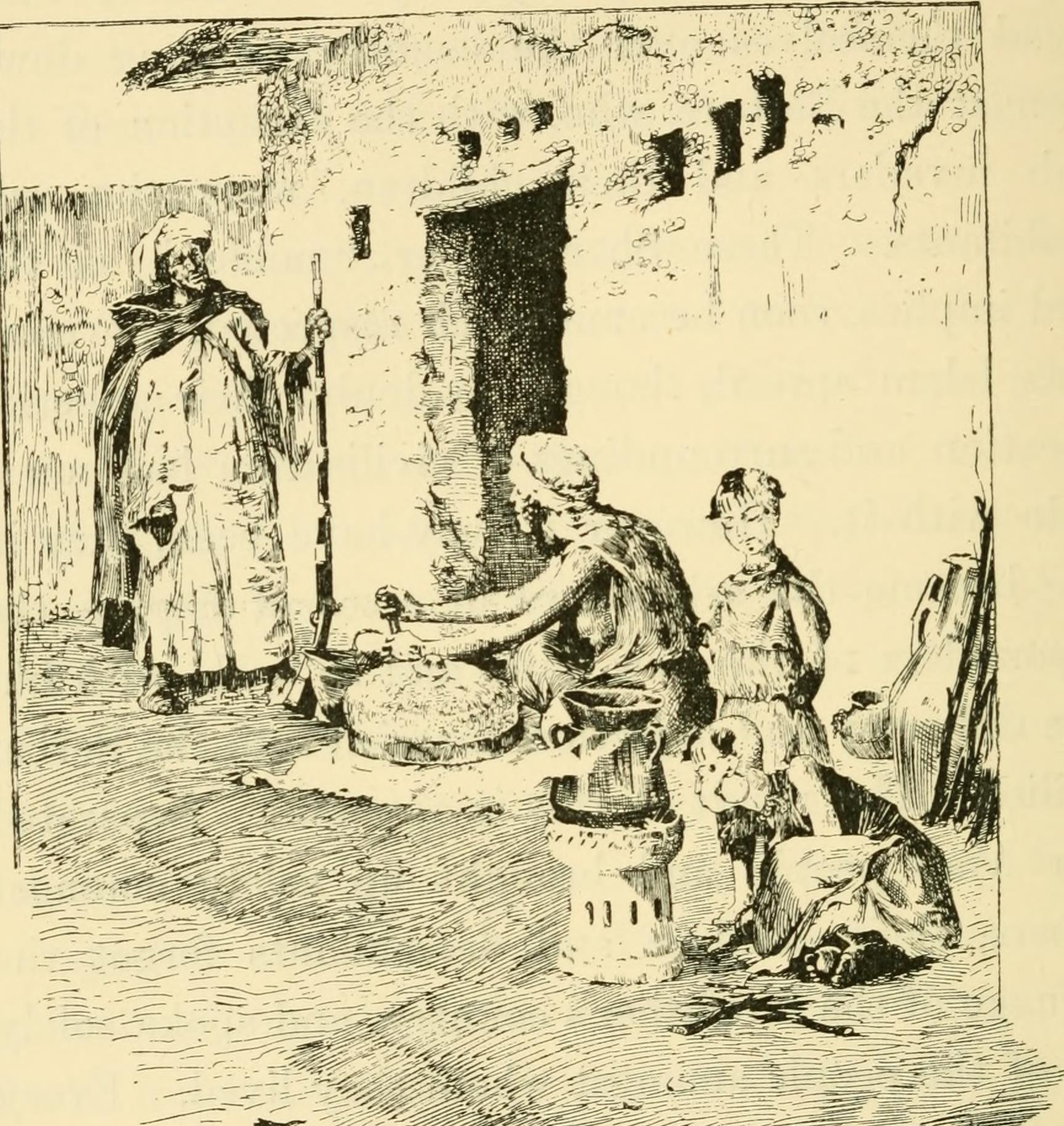
Tafilet; the narrative of a journey of exploration in the Atlas mountains and the oases of the north-west Sahara (1895) (14596234198)

Slavery existed in Morocco since antiquity until the 20th century. Morocco was a center of the Trans-Saharan slave trade route of enslaved sub-Saharan Africans until the 20th century, as well as a center of the Barbary slave trade of Europeans captured by the Barbary pirates until the 19th century. The open slave trade was finally suppressed in Morocco in the 1920s. The Haratin and the Gnawa have been referred to as descendants of formerly enslaved Black peoples.

== Slave trade ==
=== African slave trade ===
From the 7th century, during the Middle Ages, until the early 20th century, Morocco was a center of the Trans-Saharan slave trade of enslaved Black Africans along the route from Timbuktu to the slave markets in Marrakesh, from which they were transported to the rest of Morocco and throughout the entire Mediterranean world.

In accordance with the Islamic law that Muslims were free to enslave non-Muslims, African tribes who converted to Islam captured non-Muslim people and exported them along the trade route along the coast north toward Morocco.

During the Almoravid dynasty (1040–1147) the trade route exported weapons and textiles from Spain in the north to Senegal south of the Sahara, in exchange for gold, ivory, salt and slaves from the non-Islamic areas south of Senegal to coastal Morocco, the wider Mediterranean Maghreb (Morocco, Algeria, Tunisia), al-Andalus (present-day Spain and Portugal), and the Mediterranean world (North Africa, West Asia, and South Europe).

As a spoil of war after defeating the Sahel's Songhai Empire, Moroccan Sultan Isma‘il ibn Sharif was sent thousands of sub-Saharan slaves from Timbuktu each year, from which he then added to his massive army of enslaved Black African and Haratin slave-soldiers (named the Black Guard or Abid al-Bukhari). Under the Arabs and Berbers, the Black enslaved men were converted to Islam and were forcibly recruited into the Moroccan army by Ismail Ibn Sharif (Sultan of Morocco from 1672 to 1727) to consolidate power.

The trans-Saharan slave route from Timbuktu mainly went to Marrakesh, Morocco, which was known as an epicenter of the Mediterranean market of African slaves from the 7th century onward (for more than 1,000 years), until the 20th century when Morocco became a French protectorate.

In the 19th century, between 3,500 and 4,000 African slaves were trafficked to Morocco via the trans-Saharan slave trade each year; by the 1880s, they were about 500 enslaved peoples trafficked yearly.

Many concubines in Morocco were sub-Saharan Black, as they were more easily acquired in the local markets due to the trans-Saharan slave trade's continuous yearly supply.

=== European slave trade ===
From the 16th to the 18th centuries, Ottoman North Africa and the Sultanate of Morocco were centers of the Barbary slave trade. Barbary corsairs raided European ships and coastal cities along the Mediterranean Maghreb and throughout the rest of the Mediterranean world. Along with Algiers and other provinces of Ottoman North Africa, Morocco was also a center for the slave trade. Sometimes these slave raids or razzias went beyond the Mediterranean, and such even area to the north as Ireland were raided. American shipping in the Mediterranean was also targeted. From the 7th and 15th centuries, the majority of slaves traded throughout the Mediterranean region were predominantly of African and European origins. In the 15th century, Ethiopians sold slaves from western borderland areas (usually just outside the realm of the Emperor of Ethiopia) or Ennarea.

From the 16th century until the early 19th century, Morocco was also a center of the Barbary slave trade of Europeans captured by Barbary corsairs on the Atlantic and Mediterranean.

Barbary corsairs and crews from the quasi-independent North African Ottoman provinces of Algiers, Tunis, Tripoli, and the independent Sultanate of Morocco under the Alaouite dynasty (the Barbary Coast) were the scourges of the Mediterranean world. Capturing merchant ships and enslaving or ransoming their crews provided the rulers of these nations with wealth and naval power. For centuries, the Trinitarian Order (Order of "Mathurins") had operated from France with the special mission of collecting and disbursing funds for the relief and ransom of prisoners of Mediterranean corsairs.

According to Robert Davis, between 1-1.25 million Europeans were captured and sold as slaves between the 16th and 19th centuries.

== Function ==
=== Female slavery ===
Female slaves were primarily used as either domestic servants, or as concubines (sex slaves), often a combination of the two. Female house slaves were frequently sexually exploited and often used as an initiation of men in to sex. The sex slave-concubines of rich urban men who had given birth to the son of their enslaver were counted as the most privileged, since they became an Umm al-walad and became free upon the death of their enslaver; the concubine of a Bedouin mainly lived the same life as the rest of the tribal members and the women of the family. Female domestic slaves lived hard lives and reproduction among slaves was low; it was noted that the infant mortality was high among slaves, and that female slaves rarely lived until their forties; poorer slave owners often prostituted them.

According to the writings of the French diplomat Dominique Busnot, Sultan Moulay Ismail had at least 500 concubines and even more children. A total of 868 children (525 sons and 343 daughters) were recorded in 1703, with his seven-hundredth son being born shortly after his death in 1727, by which time he had more than 1,000 children. This is widely considered among the largest number of children of any human in history.

Many of his concubines are only fragmentary documented. As concubines, they were slave captives, sometimes from Europe. One of them, an Irishwoman by the name Mrs. Shaw, was brought to his harem after having been enslaved and was converted to Islam when the Sultan wished to have intercourse with her, but was manumitted and married off to a Spanish convert when the Sultan grew tired of her; the Spanish convert being very poor, she was described by contemporary witnesses as reduced to beggary. Other slave concubines became favorites and as such were allowed some influence, such as an Englishwoman called Lalla Balqis. Another favorite was a Spanish captive renamed Al-Darah, mother to Moulay Ismail's once favorite son that he himself educated: Moulay Mohammed al-Alim; and to Moulay Sharif. Around 1702, Al-Darah tragically died strangled by Moulay Ismail whom Lalla Aisha had made believe she had betrayed him. It is widely believed that part of the motive for her disgrace was that she pushed him to kill a co-concubine and her son to elevate the chances of her own son of becoming the monarch.

=== Male slavery ===
Male slaves were used as laborers, eunuchs, or soldiers. The conditions of slavery could be very hard, and male slaves were made to work in hard labor in heavy construction, in quarries, and as galley slaves, rowing the galleys, including the galleys of the Barbary corsairs themselves.

Choosing slaves to undergo the grooming process was highly selective in the Moroccan empire. There are many attributes and skills slaves can possess to win the favour and trust of their masters. When examining master/slave relationships we are able to understand that slaves with white skin were especially valued in Islamic societies. Mode of acquisition, as well as age when acquired heavily influenced slave value, as well as fostering trusting master-slave relationships. Many times, slaves acquired as adolescents or even young adults became trusted aides and confidants of their masters. Furthermore, acquiring a slave during adolescence typically leads to opportunities for education and training, as slaves acquired in their adolescent years were at an ideal age to begin military training. In Islamic societies, it was normal to begin this process at the age of ten, lasting until the age of fifteen, at which point these young men would be considered ready for military service. Slaves with specialised skills were highly valued in Islamic slave societies. Christian slaves were often required to speak and write in Arabic. Having slaves fluent in English and Arabic was a highly valued tool for diplomatic affairs. Bi-lingual slaves like Thomas Pellow used their translating ability for important matters of diplomacy. Pellow himself worked as a translator for the ambassador in Morocco.

The perhaps most famous slave military force was the Black Guard, also known as ‘Abīd al-Dīwān "slaves of the diwan", Jaysh al-‘Abīd "the slave army", and ‘Abid al-Sultan "the Sultan's slaves") were the corps of Black African slaves and Haratin slave-soldiers assembled by the 'Alawi sultan of Morocco, Isma‘il ibn Sharif (reigned 1672–1727). They were called the "Slaves of Bukhari" because Sultan Isma‘il emphasized the importance of the teachings of the famous imam Muhammad al-Bukhari, going so far as to give the leaders of the army copies of his book. This military corps, which was loyal only to the Sultan, was one of the pillars of Isma'il's power as he sought to establish a more stable and more absolute authority over Morocco. Over the course of the later 18th century and the 19th century their role in the military was progressively reduced and their political status varied between certain privileges and marginalization. Their descendants eventually resettled mostly in southern Morocco and present-day Mauritania. The Black Guard was dissolved in 1912.

Slave laborers were also used on the building construction of the Kasbah of Moulay Ismail.

== Abolition ==
Abolition came gradual for different categories of slaves.

=== Abolition of the Barbary slave trade ===
The slave trade of Europeans ended after the Barbary wars in the early 19th century.

On 11 October 1784, Moroccan pirates seized the American brigantine Betsey. The Spanish government negotiated the freedom of the captured ship and crew; however, Spain advised the United States to offer tribute to prevent further attacks against merchant ships. The United States Minister to France, Thomas Jefferson, decided to send envoys to Morocco and Algeria to try to purchase treaties and the freedom of the captured sailors held by Algeria. Morocco was the first Barbary Coast State to sign a treaty with the United States, on 23 June 1786. This treaty formally ended all Moroccan piracy against American shipping interests. Specifically, the treaty's Article Six states that if any U.S. Americans captured by Moroccans or other Barbary Coast States docked at a Moroccan city, they would be set free and come under the protection of the Moroccan State.

Following the early 19th century's Barbary wars, Barbary slave trade from Morocco against the other foreign ships also diminished. After the Second Barbary War, Barbary piracy was eradicated.

=== Abolition of African slave trade and slavery ===
In 1923, nascent French protectorate authorities ended the trans-Saharan slave trade; however, slavery as such persisted well into the 20th century throughout much of the Mediterranean – from North Africa to West Asia.

The trans-Saharan slave trade of Africans continued after the Barbary slave trade of Europeans diminished. In 1842, Sultan Abd al-Rahman of Morocco stated that slavery was something "all sects and [all] nations have agreed from the time of the sons of Adam."

In 1883, Morocco was given an official suggestion by the British Foreign Office to ban slave trade; however, Morocco refused to introduce such a ban. In the late 19th century the Sultan of Morocco stated to Western diplomats that it was impossible to ban slavery because such a ban would be unenforceable. The British asked the Sultan to ensure that the slave trade in Morocco would at least be handled discreetly, away from the eyes of foreign witnesses.

In Morocco, there was no organized internal abolition movement. However, slavery in Morocco attracted attention of the foreign abolition movement. Both foreign diplomats and foreign abolitionists were active in Morocco. During the 1880s, Anti-Slavery International reported on the slavery in the Maghreb. Petitions were sent by British representatives to the Moroccan monarch, appealing for the abolition of slavery. On 31 January 1884, the representative of the Moroccan monarch, Muhammed Bargash, answered the British representative Sir J. Drummond Hay that it was impossible to abolish slavery (as it would be contrary to Islamic law); but, that the slaves where mainly used for light domestic work to serve Muslim women, who because of sex segregation could not leave their homes. Bargash reported that the slaves were content, well treated, and would not want to be free themselves:

"We have given our attention to all you say. Know, Oh friend, that we cannot add anything to the answer given by the by direction of the Sultan, except to declare to you that the abolition of slavery can not be effected, as that would amount to abolishing Sharia, and the people of this country, especially the Ulema, would never admit this. We can assure you that Slaves are not kept in order to make money by their labour, but only for domestic service, such as in the harems, to perform services, inside the house and without, which cannot be performed by the ladies of the harem on account of their being kept indoors as is customary in towns [...] if you care to collect information, and to provide this by inquiry, it will be evident to you how well slaves are treated, so well, indeed, that most of them, male and female is offered their freedom, refuse it, and prefer to remain slaves [...]

In 1884, the British and French governments banned their own citizens and employees in Morocco from owning slaves.

From 1912-1956, Morocco became a protectorate of France and Spain, which effectively ended the country's open slave trade. In 1923, French authorities officially banned the slave trade and closed the slave markets in Morocco. While the slave trade was banned, slavery as such was never banned. When Morocco's slave markets were closed and open slavery visually disappeared from the public eye, slavery was considered to be de facto abolished.

In practice, the slave trade continued illegally at least two decades post-1923 abolition. Slavery as such continued in private, mainly in the form of domestic servants. During the decades following 1923, slavery gradually diminished in Morocco as changing attitudes made it less common to acquire slaves, and more common to manumit already existing slaves. In the 1930s, France reported to the Advisory Committee of Experts on Slavery that slavery had been abolished in all French territories in continental Africa, including Morocco. Spain reported that they had abolished the slave trade in northern Morocco. Spanish authorities avoided mentioning the institution of slavery as such in their report. During the 1930s, house slaves were still used in private homes in Morocco. By 1952, the majority of the existing slaves in Morocco were reportedly kidnapped as children. Because this was viewed as against Islamic law, the speed of the manumissions increased. Until the 1950s, most Moroccan families manumitted their slaves, who were mostly female house slaves by this time period. Former female slaves (tata) often continued to work in their former owners' households or for other families in exchange for food and shelter; they worked as cooks or arata (ritual inviters), or sought refuge in charitable institutions. Some destitute former female slaves also turned to prostitution in order to survive.

Following Morocco's post-protectorate independence in 1956, slavery was said to be essentially confined to the household slaves of the royal harem. The traditional royal harem still existed during the reign of King Hassan II of Morocco (1961–1999): the Royal Harem included 40 concubines (who by Islamic law were by definition slaves), as well as an additional 40 concubines whom the king had inherited from his father. Additional concubines also worked as domestic servants, as well as male slaves performing such other positions as chauffeurs in the Royal Household. The slaves of the Royal Household were descended from enslaved ancestors who had been inherited within the household over generations. In 1999, Mohammed VI of Morocco dissolved these practices when he ascended to the throne.

== After abolition ==
The Haratin, or Black slave descendants, have historically been (and still commonly are) socially isolated in Maghreb countries, including Morocco. The Haratin live in segregated, Haratin-only ghettos. The Haratin converted to Islam under the Arabs and Berbers, and they are commonly perceived as an endogamous group of former slaves or descendants of enslaved Black peoples.

== Gallery ==
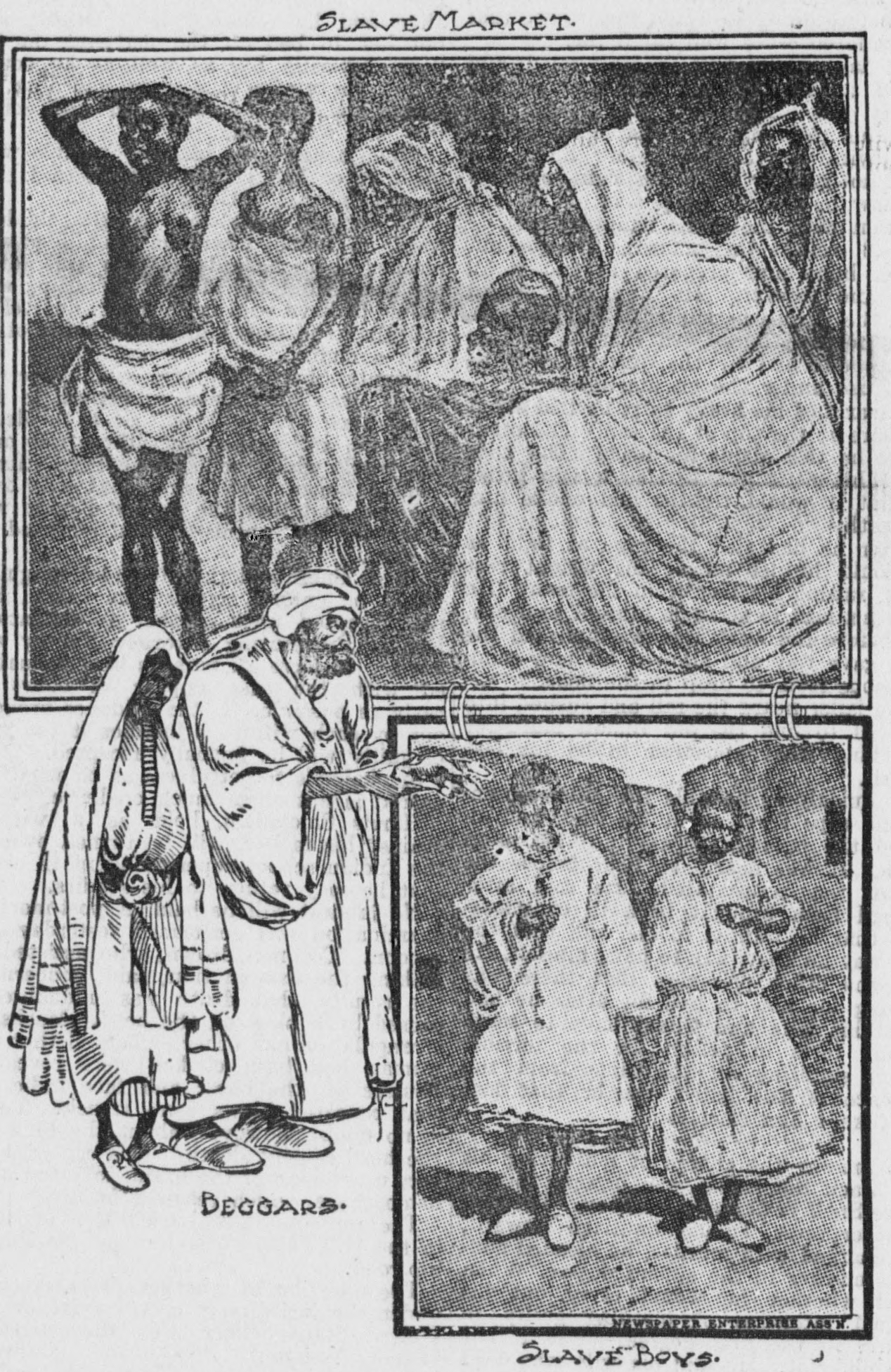
Moroccan slaves (1903 montage)

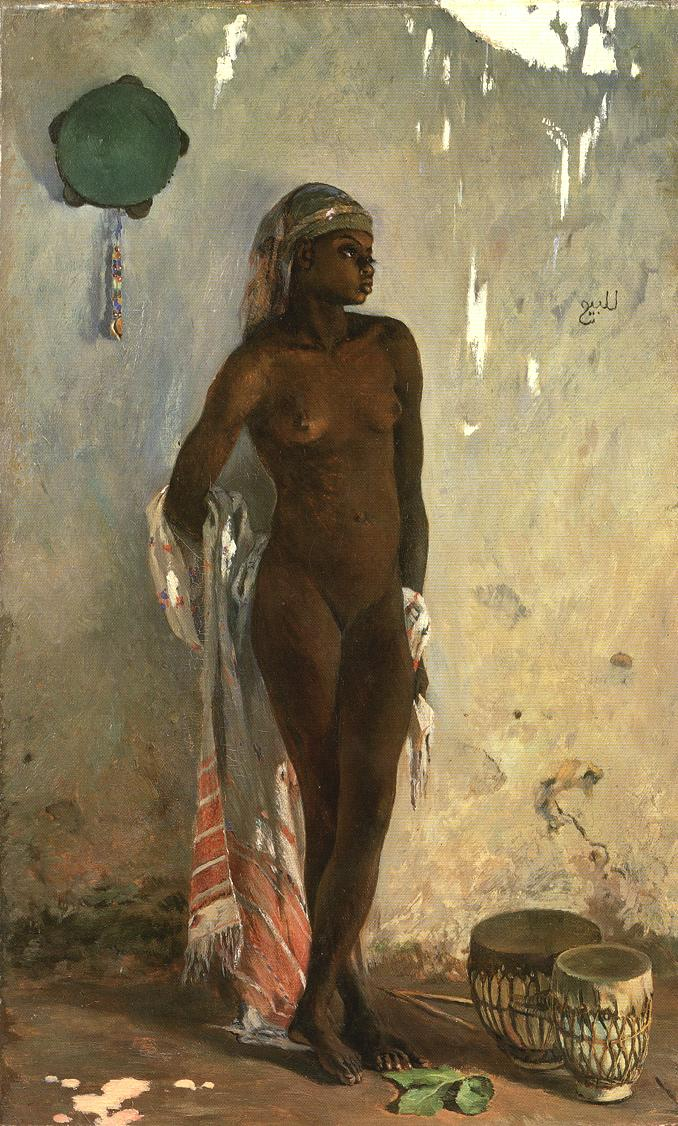
Frank Buchser Nackte Sklavin mit Tamburin 1880

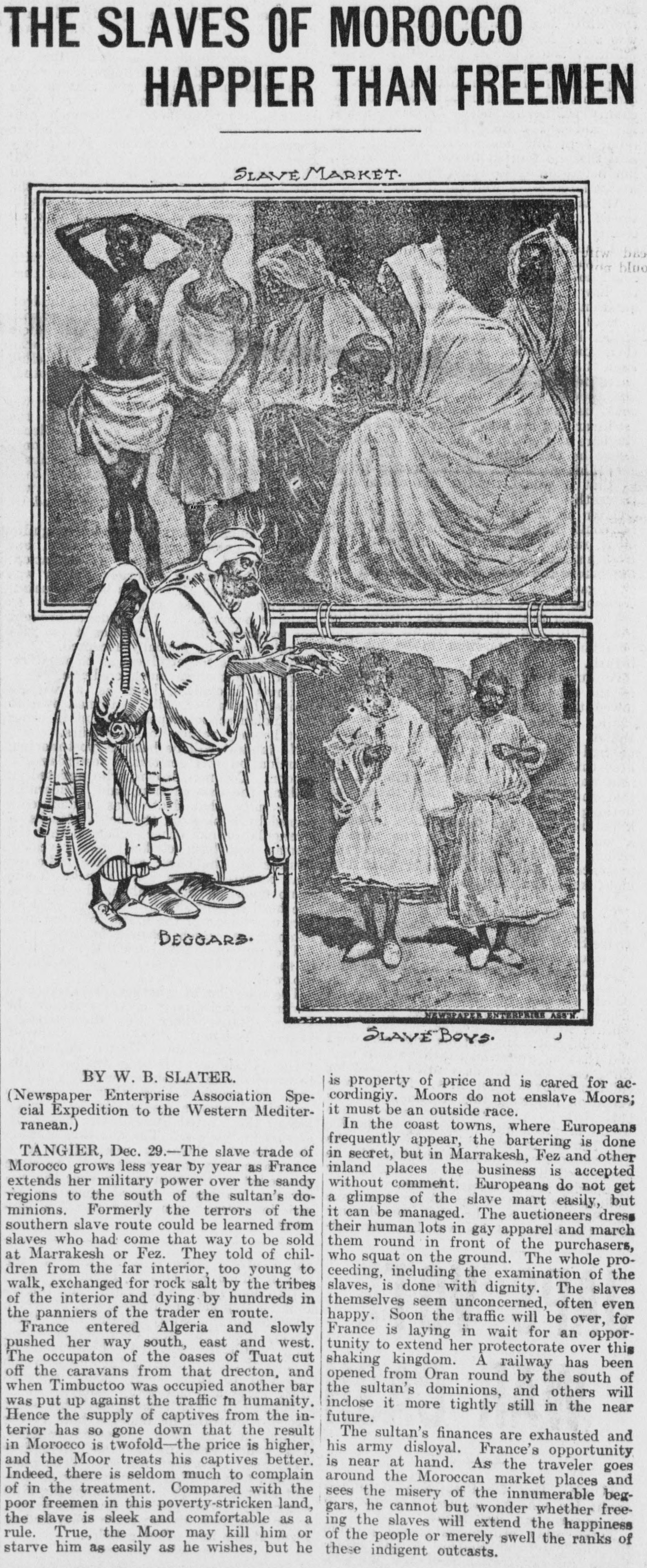
1903 article on slavery in Morocco

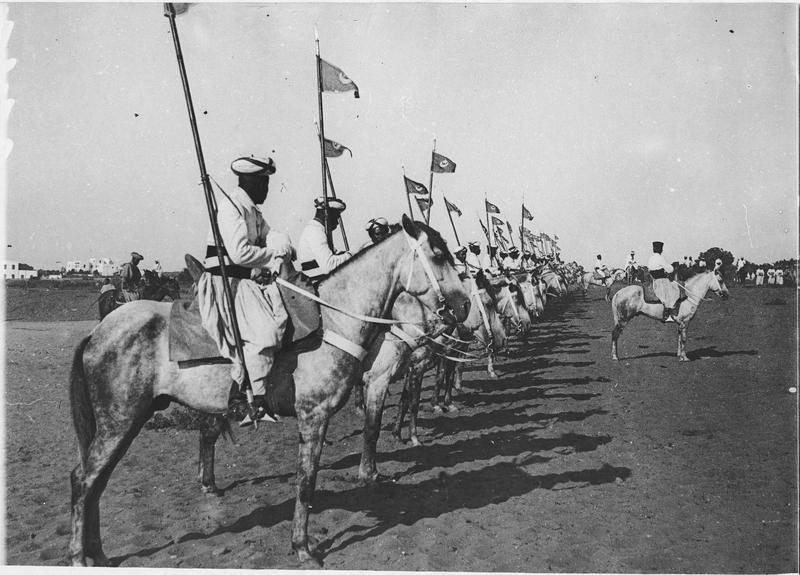
Chez le sultan, la Garde noire montée - Rabat - Médiathèque de l'architecture et du patrimoine - AP62T111423

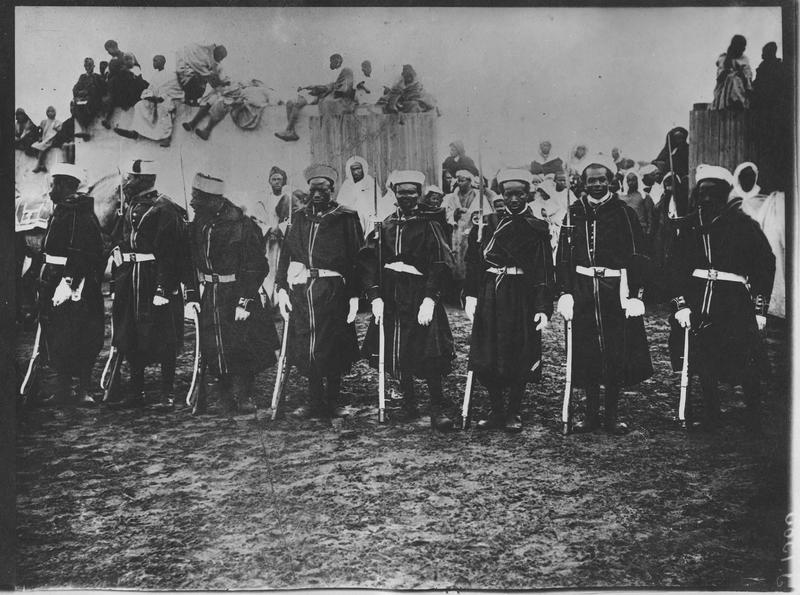
La Garde noire du sultan, et en arrière-plan les curieux - Rabat - Médiathèque de l'architecture et du patrimoine - AP62T169894

== See also ==
- History of slavery in the Muslim world
- History of concubinage in the Muslim world
- Slavery on the Barbary Coast
- Human trafficking in Morocco
- Moors Sundry Act of 1790
