= Marcelin Flandrin =

French photographer (1889–1957)

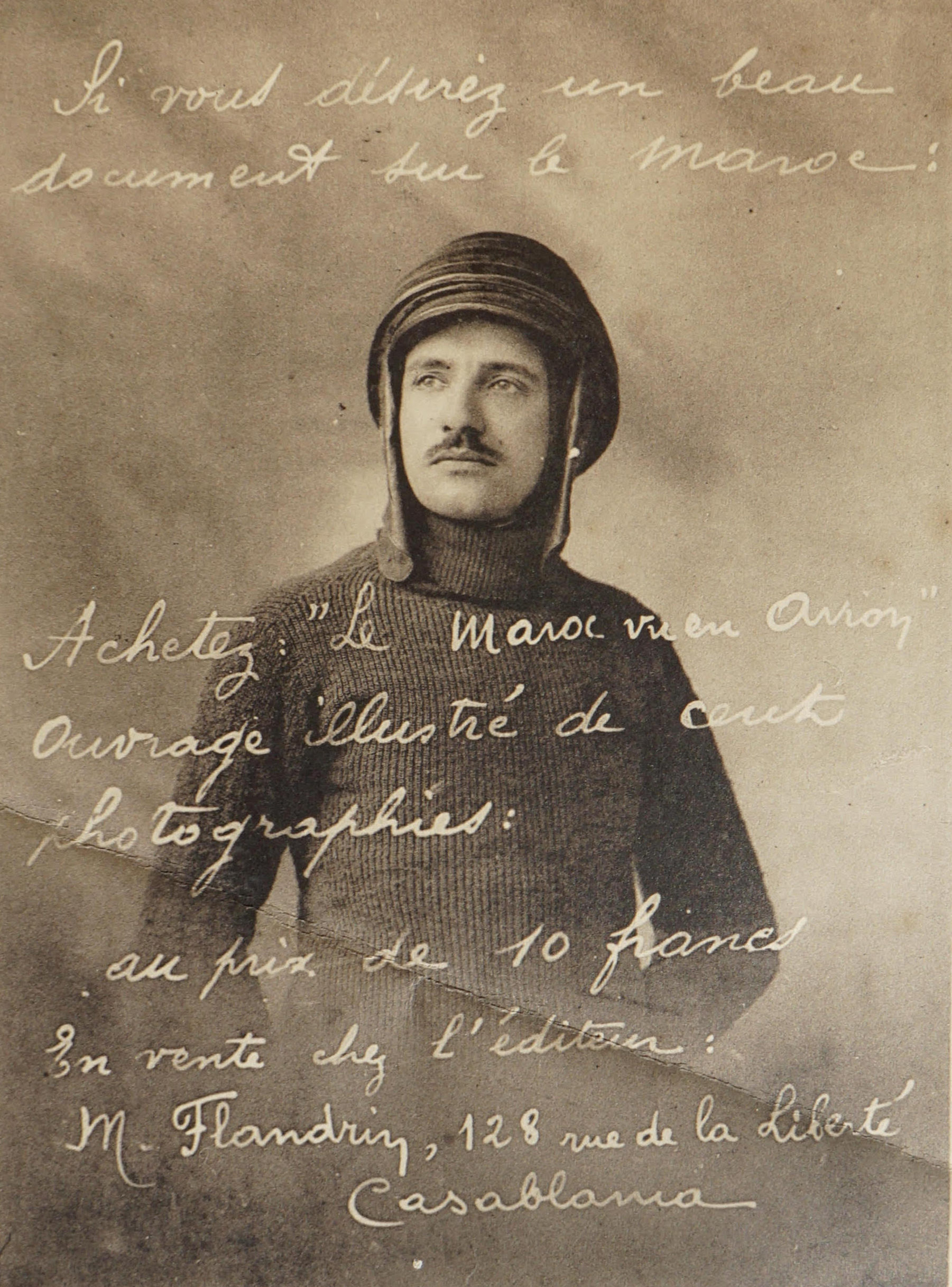
- Flandrin in 1920
- Born: 1889; Annaba, French Algeria
- Died: 1957 (aged 67–68); Casablanca, Morocco
- Occupation: Photographer
- Notable work: Casablanca, de 1889 à nos jours

Marcelin Flandrin (1889–1957) was a French military photographer.

== Biography ==
Marcelin Flandrin settled in Morocco in 1901, where he completed his military service as a volunteer in 1912. A photographer by profession, he served in the Service Photographique des Armées (fr), completing a series of reports during the Rif War. In World War I, he served in the French Air Force, finishing as an aerial observer sending aerial shots of battles.

He settled in Casablanca, capturing the city in transformation from 1921 to 1930, publishing a book entitled Casablanca de 1889 à nos jours in 1929. In 1921, he published aerial images of a flight from Casablanca to France in L'Illustration. In 1922, he illustrated the Morocco pavilion at the Exposition coloniale de Marseille. In 1924, his photos were published in "Nordafrica" next to those of Rudolf Lehnert. He covered the official visit of Sultan Yusef of Morocco to France in 1926. Marcelin Flandrin was also one of the most important publishers of postcards in Morocco.

He was also the first to do aerial photography in Morocco; he notably captured the last known photograph of a wild Barbary lion in the Atlas Mountains, taken on a flight from Casablanca to Dakar in 1925.

Marcelin Flandrin also created many nude orientalist postcards of Moroccan women in the Bousbir, or quartier réservé, a colonial brothel-city in Casablanca. Flandrin was influential in creating the stereotype of the "Arab African" prostitute: young, brown, exotic-looking (to the European eye), topless, and wearing robes or kaftans. Most of the photographs were carefully staged rather than being taken spontaneously.

== Publications ==
- Marcelin Flandrin, Joseph Georges Arsène Goulven, Casablanca rétro, Éditions Serar, 1988
- Marcelin Flandrin, Casablanca, de 1889 à nos jours, Éditions Serar, 1999.
