= Bousbir =

Bousbir بوسبير
- Red-light district
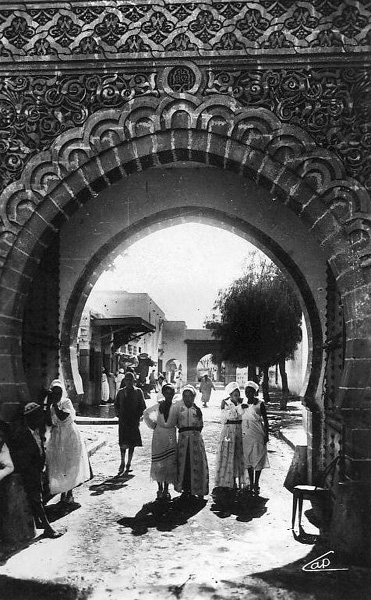
- Entrance to the Bousbir

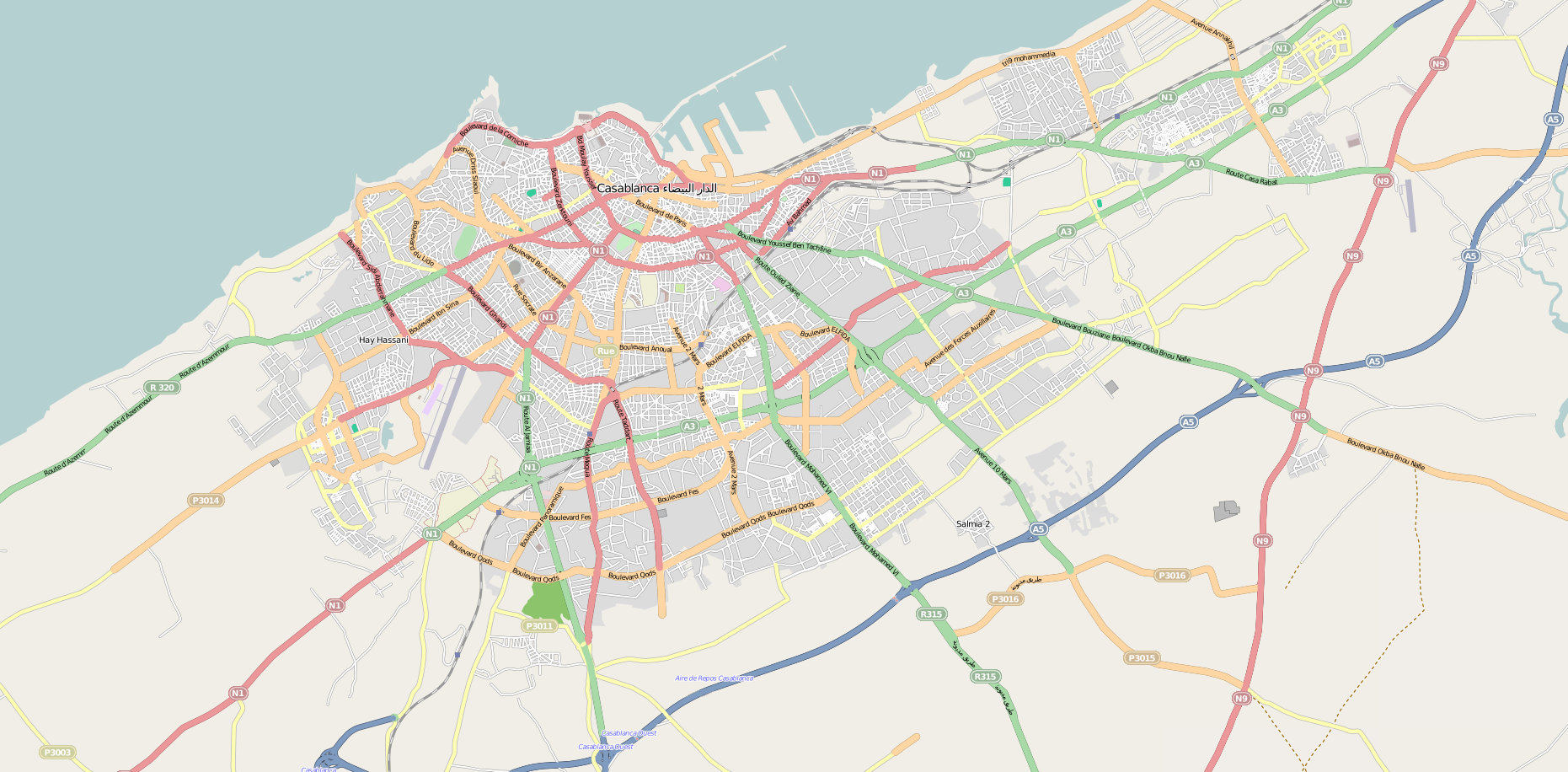
- Location in Casablanca Bousbir (Morocco)
- Coordinates: 33.57504°N 7.6027507°W
- Country: Morocco
- City: Casablanca
- Opened: 1924
- Closed: 1955

Dimensions
  - Length: 0.16 km (0.099 mi)
  - Width: 0.15 km (0.093 mi)

Bousbir (Moroccan Arabic: بوسبير, French: quartier réservé) was a walled-off brothel quarter in Casablanca, Morocco, established by Resident General Lyautey during the French protectorate.

== Origins ==
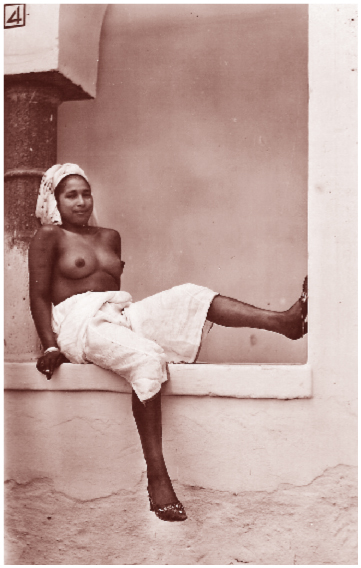
Typical postcard of an African prostitute

Following the Treaty of Fez in 1912, Morocco became a French protectorate.

The French authorities were concerned about the spread of STIs, particularly syphilis, amongst the troops stationed in the protectorate. They set up quartiers réservés (red light districts) and prostitution was highly regulated and only permitted within the quartiers.

== Relocation ==
Hubert Lyautey, the first Resident General of the protectorate, wished to rebuild and expand Casablanca. He engaged French architect Henri Prost to plan the new city.

Prost and his associates developed Casablanca's master plan from 1917 to 1922. Within this plan, Prost included a new quartier réservé away from the city centre. The area was to be run by a company named La Cressonière, who owned the land, financed the building and would collect rents from the occupants.

In 1924 the red light district moved to its new location.

== Etymology ==
Bousbir is the Moroccan pronunciation of the first name of Prosper Ferrieu, a French diplomat who owned the land the new quartier réservés was built on.

== Layout ==
The area was designed in a neo-moorish style by architect Edmond Brion to appeal to the orientalist taste of European visitors.

The area enclosed a rectangle 160 metres by 150 metres, surrounded by a high, windowless wall. There was a single public entrance. From the main entrance a wide street led to the main square (20 x 48 metres). Off the main street and square ran a labyrinth of alleys. Each of the alleys had a name that indicated the origins of the prostitutes such as Elfassiya Street, Doukkaliya Street, Lahriziya Street etc.

Bousbir included 175 residences, a cinema, a sauna, cabarets, restaurants, 8 cafés, numerous boutiques, a police station and barracks, a prison, and a dispensary.

== 1924–1955 ==
At any one time between 450 and 680 prostitutes lived and worked there. They sold their sexual service to between 1000 and 1,500 visitors daily. Some came to Bousbir of their own free will, but about a third were brought there after being arrested for illicit prostitution elsewhere in the city. Many were heavily indebted to the “madam” they worked for. The minimum age for the prostitutes was 12.

The prostitutes had regular mandatory health checks and were only allowed to leave once a week after gaining a permit from the police. Women and girls "working" in the area were subject to the inflexible authority of by French protectorate with almost no independence provided. They weren't given any salary, and only shared tips given by the customers.

Tourists did not just visit Bousbir to purchase sex. It was designed to provide an 'oriental experience' for European tourists. They could sample the Moroccan cuisine, see belly dances, striptease or pornographic shows, or just sit on a terrace and watch the women solicit clients while listening to oriental music.

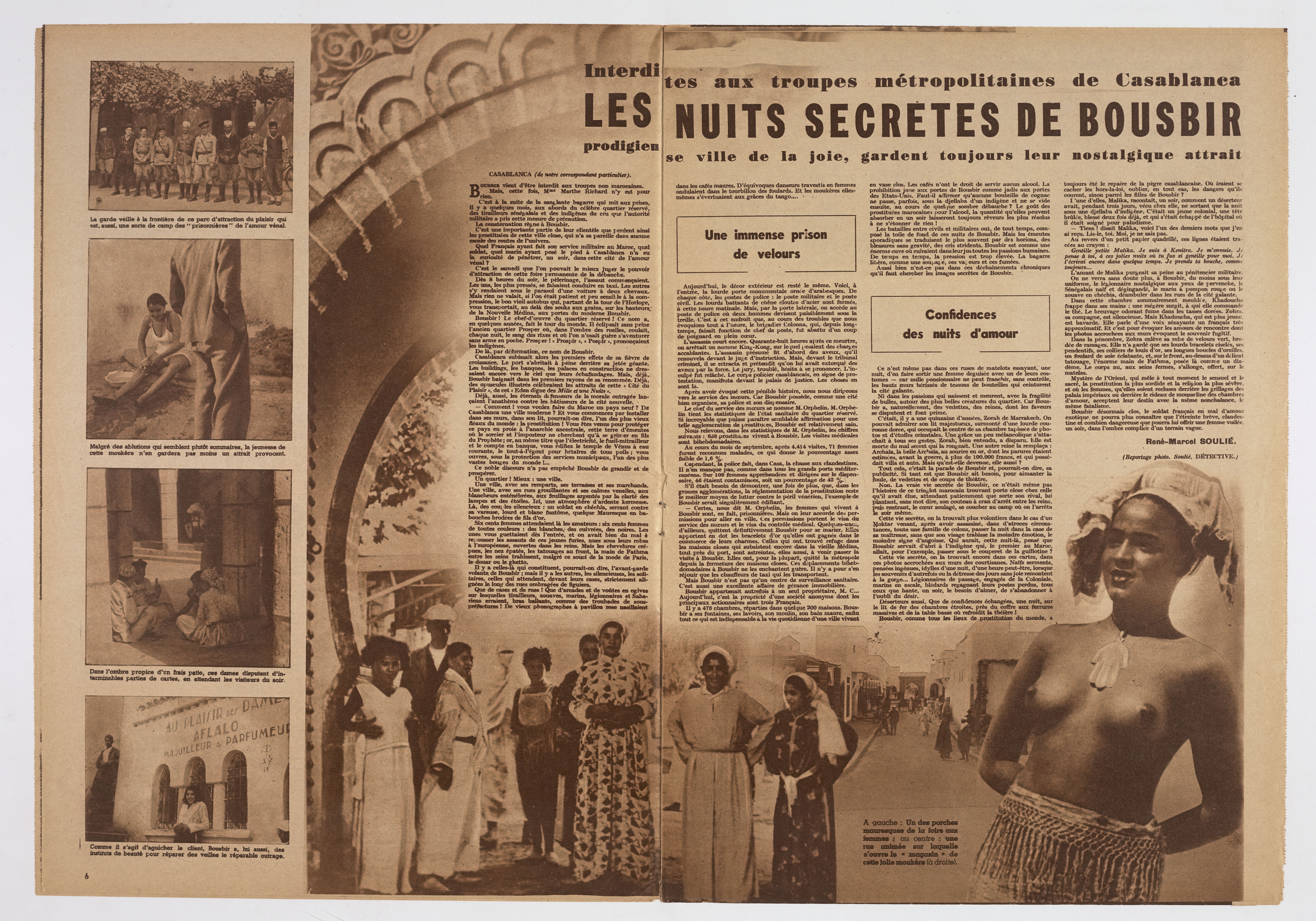
Bousbir in the French magazine Qui ? le magazine de l'énigme et de l'aventure November 6, 1947.

Picture postcards were available as souvenirs. Many were taken by French military photographer Marcelin Flandrin. He was influential in creating the stereotype of the "Arab African" prostitute: young, brown, exotic looking (to the European eye) topless and wearing robes or kaftans. Most of the photographs were carefully staged rather than being taken spontaneously.

Religious, feminist, socialist and anticolonialist factions put so much pressure on the colonial authorities that they closed the quartier réservé in April 1955.

== Bibliography ==
- Cohen, Jean-Louis; Eleb, Monique (2002). Casablanca: Colonial Myths and Architectural Ventures. Monacelli Press. ISBN 978-1-58093-087-1.
- García, Magaly Rodríguez; van Voss, Lex Heerma; Meerkerk, Elise Nederveen, eds. (2017). Selling Sex in the City: A Global History of Prostitution, 1600s-2000s. BRILL. doi:10.1163/9789004346253. ISBN 978-9004346246.
- Maginn, Paul J.; Steinmetz, Christine (10 October 2014). (Sub)Urban Sexscapes: Geographies and Regulation of the Sex Industry. Routledge. ISBN 978-1-135-00833-8.
