= List of universities in Mongolia =

== Public universities ==
- National University of Mongolia
- Mongolian University of Science and Technology
- Mongolian National University of Education
- Mongolian National University of Medical Sciences
- Mongolian University of Life Sciences
- University of Internal Affairs of Mongolia
- National Defense University
- Mongolian National University of Arts and Culture
- Khovd University
- Dornod University
- Mongolian Railway Institute
- National University of Commerce and Business
- Ulaanbaatar State University
- Institute of Labor and Social Relations
- Mongolian State Conservatory
- German-Mongolian Institute for Resources and Technology
- Buddhist University of Mongolia
- National Academy of Governance
- National Intelligence Academy

== Private universities ==
- Mongolian National University
- University of Finance and Economics
- Etugen University
- University of the Humanities
- Ikh Zasag International University
- Ulaanbaatar Erdem University
- Mandakh University
- Institute of Education, Culture and Law
- Global Leadership University
- International University of Ulaanbaatar
- Citi University
- Ach Medical University
- Orkhon University
- Otgontenger University
- Gazarchin Institute
- Mongolian University of Pharmaceutical Sciences
- National Technical University
- New Medical University
- Ider University
- Mon Altius Institute
- Shihihutug Law University
- The University of Construction and Design of Mongolia
- Zasagt Khan Institute
- Royal International University
- Mongolian National Institute of Physical Education
- Graduate University of Mongolia
- Margad Institute
- Darkhan Institute
- Huree University
- University of International Economics and Business
- National University of Economics
- Institute Of Engineering and Technology
- Soyol-Erdem Institute
- Tsetsee Goun Institute
- Mongolia International University
- Khangai Institute
- San University
- Urlakh Erdem Fashion design Institute
- Institute of Movie art
- Avarga Institute
- Eco-Asia Institute
- Tenger Institute
- Otoch Manramba University
- Gurvan Erdene Institute of Pedagogy
- Tushee Institute
- Institute of Technology
- Tsakhim Institute
- Institute of International Studies
- New Mongol Institute of Technology
- Seruuleg University
- Human Resources Management College
- New Civilization Institute
- Enerel Institute
- International University of China and Mongolia
- Institute of Sociology and Psychology
- Institute of Literature and Social Work
- Institute of Language and Civilization
- Chinggis Khaan Institute
- New Mongol College of Technology
- Gurvan Tamir College
- Zuun Khuree College
- Construction Technology College

== Branches of foreign higher educational institutions ==
- Ulan Bator Institute (branch) of Plekhanov Russian University of Economics
- Raffles International Institute of Ulaanbaatar
