= Chilkhaajavyn Avday =

Mongolian engineer and politician

Member of the MPRP Little Khural

Personal details
- Born: 1943 (age 82–83) Uvs Province, Mongolia
- Party: Mongolian People's Revolutionary Party
- Education: National University of Mongolia

Chilkhaajavyn Avday (Mongolian: Чилхаажавын Авдай; b. 1943) is a Mongolian engineer and politician. He is a member of the Mongolian Academy of Sciences.

== Awards ==
- People's Teacher (Mongolian: Ардын Багш) of Mongolia
- Honorary degree (Mongolian University of Science and Technology)
