= Gerel Ochir =

Mongolian geologist

- Гэрэл Очир
- Born: 17 July 1941 (age 85); Moscow, Soviet Union
- Education: Charles University; Irkutsk Institute of Geochemistry; Vinogradov Institute of Geochemistry
- Awards: Jan Masaryk Medal (2021)
- Scientific career
- Fields: Geology, petrology, geochemistry
- Workplaces: Mongolian University of Science and Technology
- Thesis: "Petrology and geochemistry of granite with crystal-bearing pegmatites of Eastern Mongolia." (1978)

Gerel Ochir (Mongolian: Гэрэл Очир; born 17 July 1941) is a Mongolian geologist. She specializes in petrology, geochemistry, and metallogeny. She has taught at the Mongolian University of Science and Technology for over 50 years and headed the Department of Geology for 30 years.

After earning bachelor's and master's degrees in geology, geochemistry, and petrology from Charles University in Prague, she received her PhD and ScD through the Siberian Branch of the Russian Academy of Sciences.

Ochir has served as vice president of the International Union of Geological Sciences and received the Jan Masaryk Medal in 2021.

== Early life and education ==
Gerel Ochir was born in Moscow on 17 July 1941. She gained an interest in geology at the age of 10 after her mother gave her a book on geology by Russian geochemist Alexander Fersman. She graduated from secondary school in Ulaanbaatar in 1958.

From 1959, Ochir attended Charles University in Prague. She earned a bachelor's degree in geology and petrography in 1964. She then spent a year with the Department of Geological Survey at the Central Geological Laboratory before she started teaching at the Mongolian State University (now Mongolian University of Science and Technology) in 1965. She later returned to Charles University, earning her RNDr. in geology and geochemistry in 1980. Ochir earned her PhD in petrology from the Irkutsk Institute of Geochemistry of the Siberian Branch of the Russian Academy of Sciences in 1978. Her thesis was on the "Petrology and geochemistry of granite with crystal-bearing pegmatites of Eastern Mongolia." Ochir earned her ScD in geochemistry, petrology, and metallogeny from the Vinogradov Institute of Geochemistry of the Russian Academy of Sciences in 1990.

== Career ==
Ochir has been a professor at the Mongolian University of Science and Technology since 1965. She held the positions of assistant professor, associate professor and professor, teaching courses in petrology and petrography. She served as the head of the university's Department of Geology and Mineralogy from 1978 to 2009. She has also served as Director of the university's Geoscience Center since 2001.

Ochir has carried out field and basic research work through joint expeditions of the Russian and Mongolian Academies of Sciences. She is the author of over 350 scientific publications and was the lead editor of the book Mineral Resources of Mongolia.

Ochir served as vice president of the International Union of Geological Sciences for four years. She is an adjunct professor at the Institute of Mineral Resources of the Chinese Academy of Geological Sciences and a foreign member of the Russian Academy of Natural Sciences.

Ochir is an Honoured Scientist of Mongolia. She was presented with the Jan Masaryk Medal by the Czech Ambassador in 2021.

== Personal life ==
Ochir married a chemist and has one daughter.

== Selected publications ==
- Dostal, Jaroslav; Kontak, Daniel J.; Gerel, Ochir; Gregory Shellnutt, J.; Fayek, Mostafa (1 November 2015). "Cretaceous ongonites (topaz-bearing albite-rich microleucogranites) from Ongon Khairkhan, Central Mongolia: Products of extreme magmatic fractionation and pervasive metasomatic fluid: rock interaction". Lithos. 236–237: 173–189. Bibcode:2015Litho.236..173D. doi:10.1016/j.lithos.2015.08.003.
- Linhoff, Benjamin S.; Bennett, Philip C.; Puntsag, Tamir; Gerel, Ochir (January 2011). "Geochemical evolution of uraniferous soda lakes in Eastern Mongolia". Environmental Earth Sciences. 62 (1): 171–183. Bibcode:2011EES....62..171L. doi:10.1007/s12665-010-0512-8. hdl:2152/43997. S2CID 130999982.
- Ochir, Gerel (June 1998). "Phanerozoic felsic magmatism and related mineralization in Mongolia (特集 モンゴル国の鉱物資源)". 地質調査所月報. 49 (6): 239–248.
- Ochir, Gerel; Munkhtsengel, Baatar; Seltmann, R; Kirwin, DJ (2005). "Erdenetiin Ovoo porphyry copper–molybdenum deposit in northern Mongolia". Geodynamics and Metallogeny of Mongolia with a Special Emphasis on Copper and Gold Deposits. CERCAMS, Natural History Museum, London. 85: 103.
