= Disability in Mongolia =

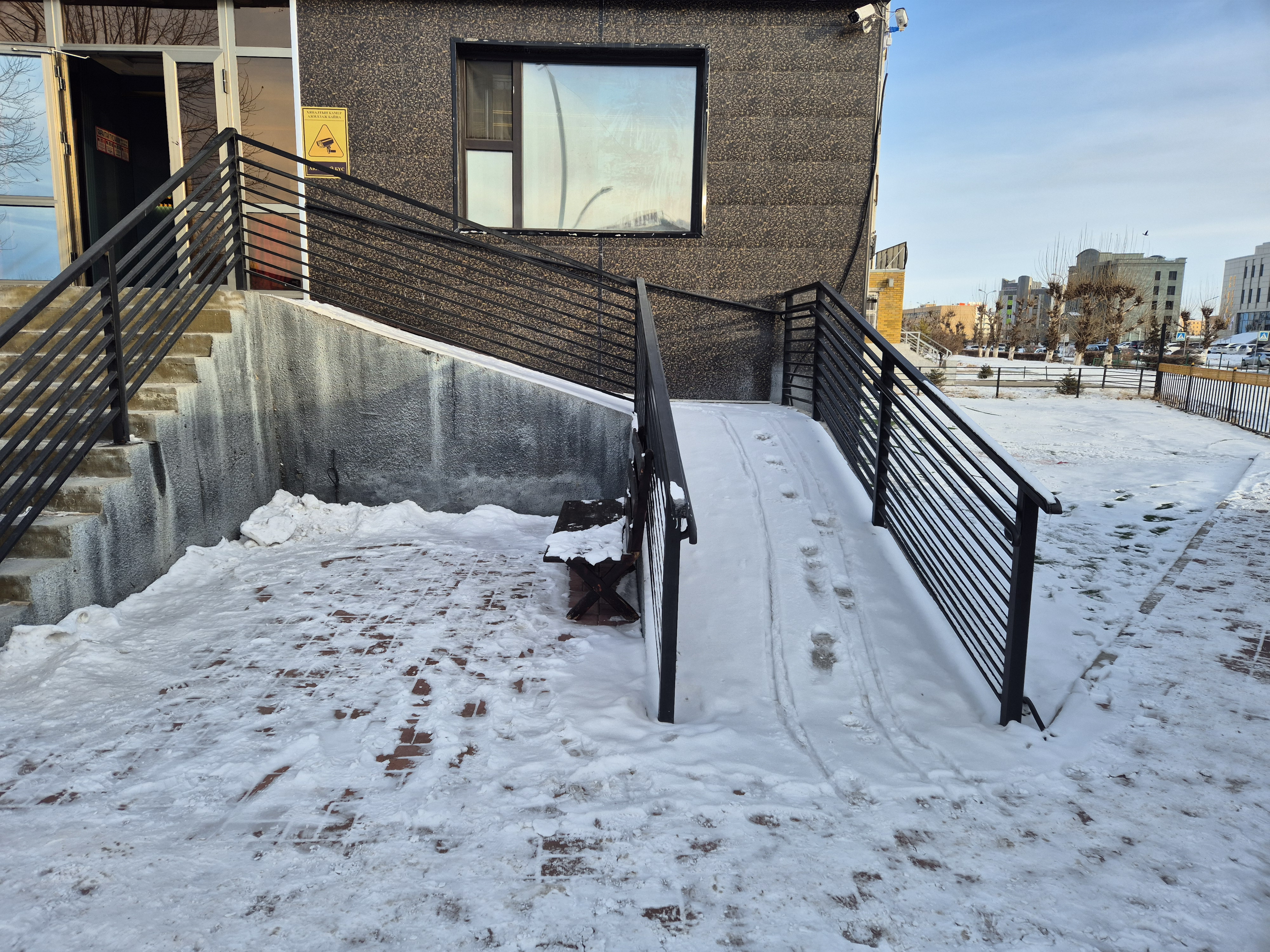
Wheelchair ramp in Darkhan, Darkhan-Uul

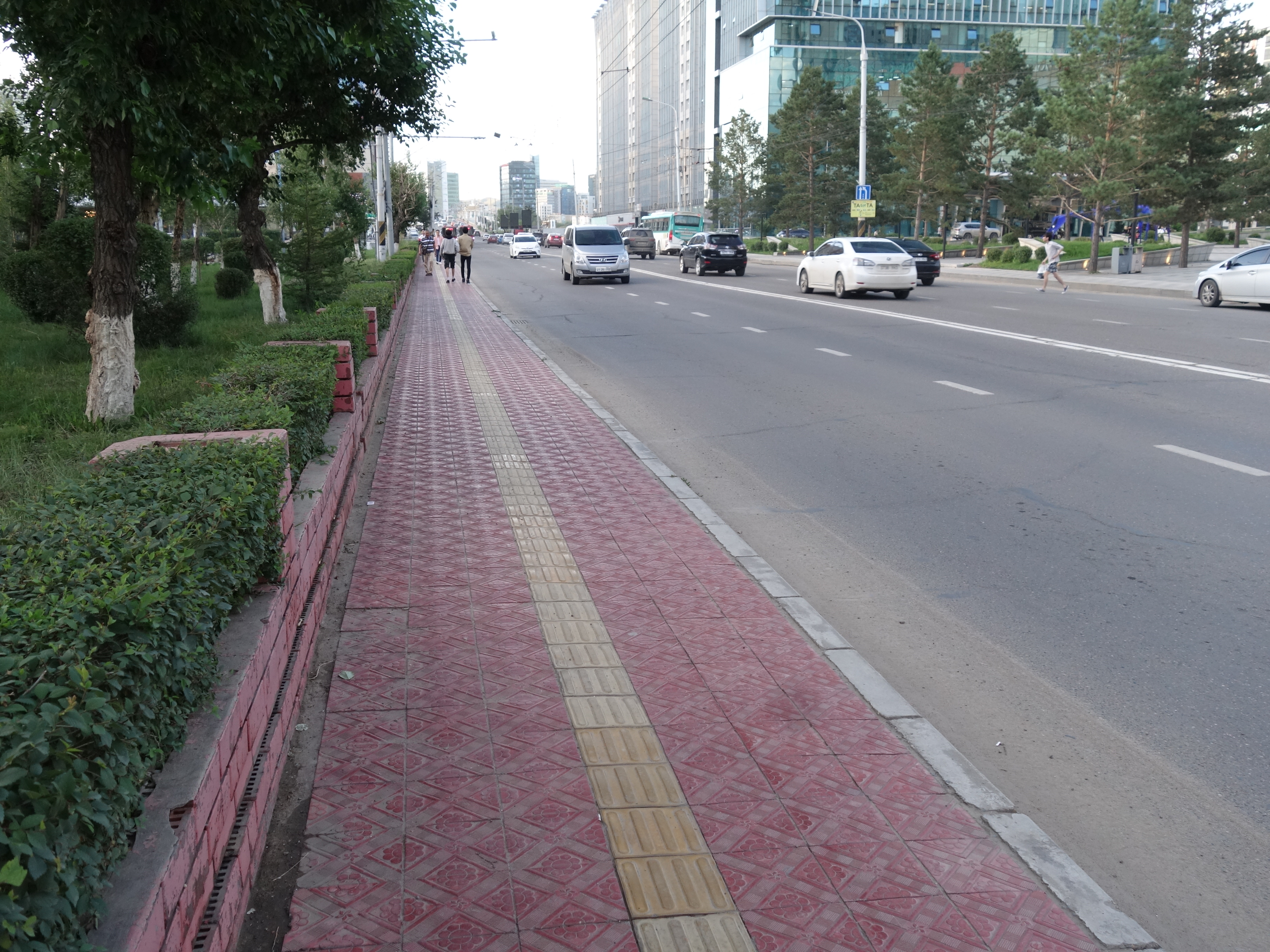
Tactile paving along Chinggis Avenue in Ulaanbaatar

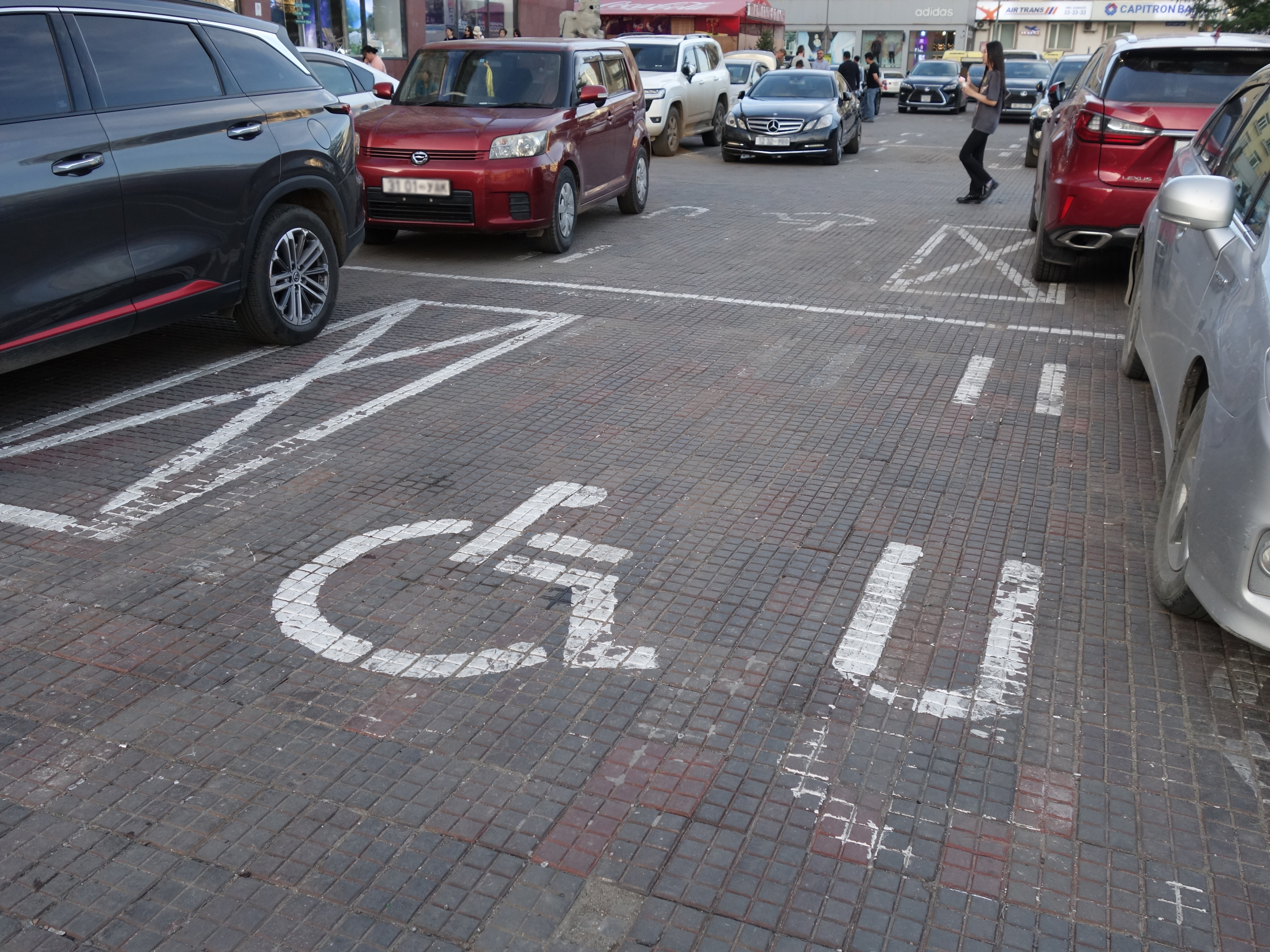
Parking for the disabled in Ulaanbaatar

Disability in Mongolia refers to the people with disabilities in Mongolia.

== History ==
The Law of Mongolia on Human Rights of Persons with Disabilities was enacted in 2016 by the State Great Khural. The national program for rights, participation and protection of persons with disabilities was approved by the government in 2017 and implemented afterwards.

A 2018 review by the World Health Organization found that, like many developing countries, people with disabilities have difficulty in exercising both political and civil rights, as well as accessing education and employment.

== Statistics ==
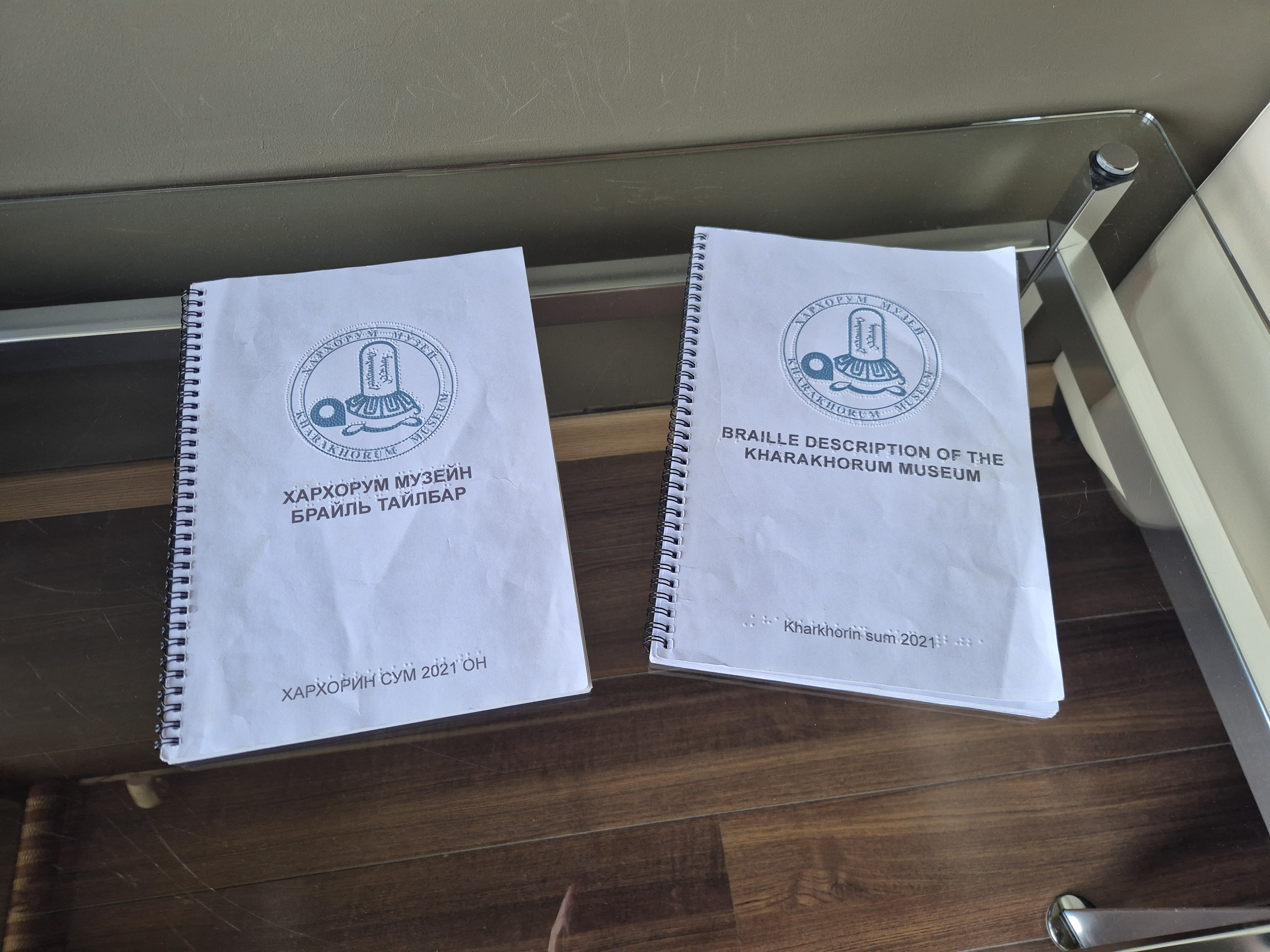
Description in braille for Kharakhorum Museum in Kharkhorin

As of 2024, there were 115,000 people with various degrees of disability in Mongolia. Types of disabilities in the country are mobility impairment (19.9%), mental disability (19.0%), vision impairment (10.6%), hearing impairment (8.2%), language impediment (4.0%), various combination (7.5%) and others (30.4%). About 11% of them are children.

=== By area ===
In 2019 in Govisümber Province, there were 742 people with disability, accounting for 4% of the province's residence. In Dornogovi Province, there were 2,642 people with disability, accounting for 3.7% of the province's residence.

== Education ==
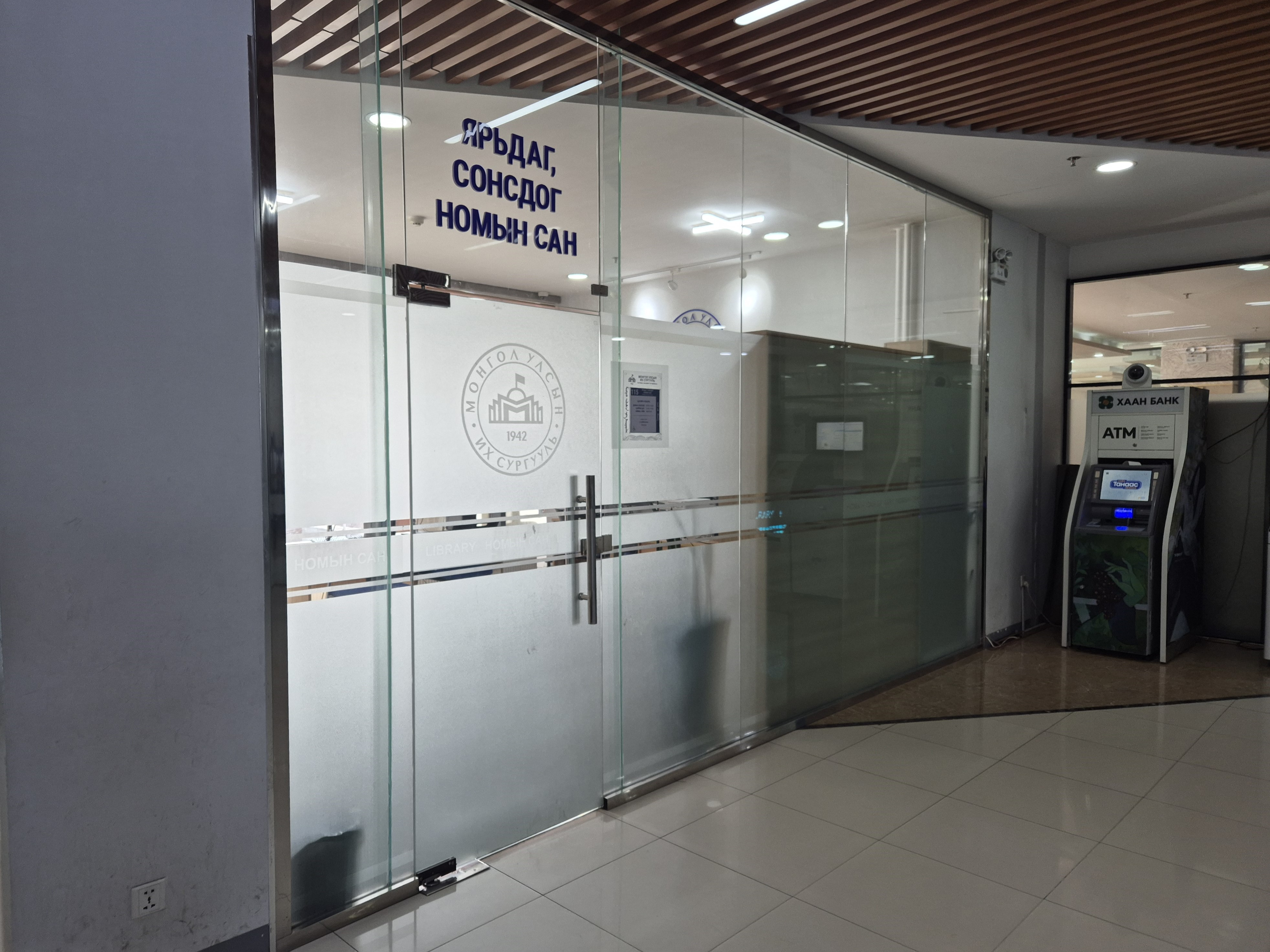
Speaking and Listening Library of National University of Mongolia Library

In 2023, the National University of Mongolia launched a library with audiobooks for their students with disabilities. The library is reserved exclusively for those people.

== Centers for disabled people ==
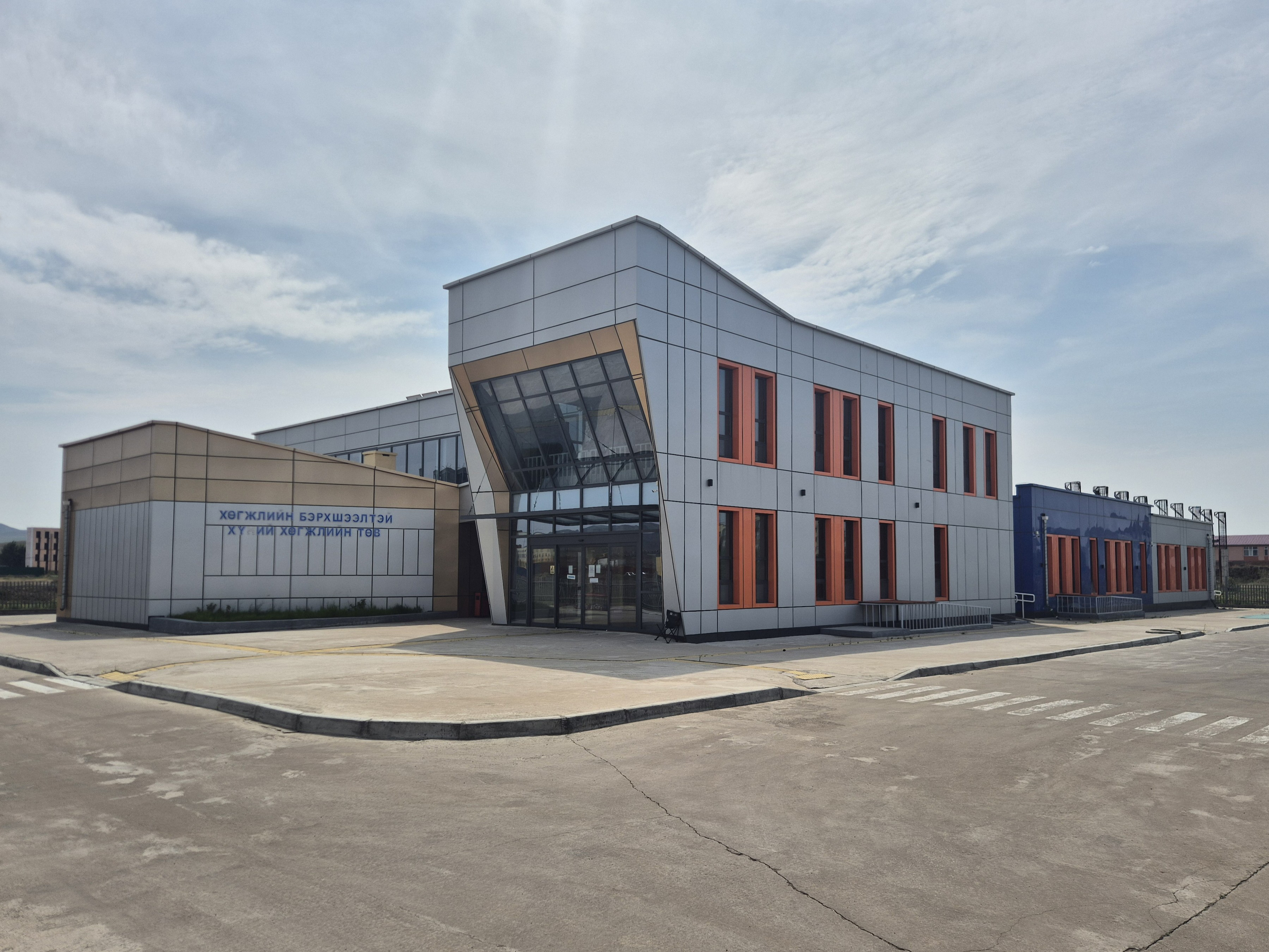
Center for the Development of People with Disabilities in Darkhan, Darkhan-Uul

- Development Center for Children with Disabilities, Ulaanbaatar
- Center for the Development of People with Disabilities, Darkhan

== See also ==
- Mongolia at the Paralympics
