= Baasangiin Erdenebayar =

Mongolian international footballer

Personal information
- Full name: Baasangiin Erdenebayar; Баасангийн Эрдэнэбаяр
- Place of birth: Mongolia
- Position: Defender

Team information
- Current team: Ulaanbaatar University

Senior career*
Years	Team	Apps	(Gls)
2011–	Ulaanbaatar University		

International career
2011–	Mongolia	2	(0)
- * Club domestic league appearances and goals

Baasangiin Erdenebayar (Mongolian: Баасангийн Эрдэнэбаяр) is a Mongolian international footballer. He made his first appearance for the Mongolia national football team in 2011.
