= Orgoi Sergelen =

Mongolian surgeon (born 1958)

Sergelen Orgoi
- Born: Ulaanbaatar, Mongolia
- Education: Mongolian National University of Medical Sciences
- Occupation: Surgeon

Sergelen Orgoi is a Mongolian surgeon best known for developing low cost liver transplantation and laparoscopic surgery in Mongolia. She is an honorary fellow of the American College of Surgeons (ACS). She is a professor of surgery and the head of Surgery Department at the Mongolian National University of Medical Sciences, and vice president of the Mongolian Surgical Association.

== Education ==
Sergelen earned a Bachelor of Medicine (BM) in 1982, a Master of Clinical Medicine (MM) in 1983, a Doctor of Medicine (MD) in 1997, and a Doctor of Philosophy (PhD) in 2002 from the Mongolian National University of Medical Sciences (MNUMS). She completed medical fellowships in developed countries such as South Korea, Switzerland, USA, and Finland.

== Career ==
Sergelen taught surgery at the Mongolian National University of Medical Sciences from 1982 to 2002. In 2002, she became the head of the Surgery Department there, and she holds this position to present date.

== Developing low-cost liver transplantation in Mongolia ==
In 2011, Sergelen and her team of surgeons did the first successful liver transplantation in Mongolia at the First Central Hospital of Mongolia. Her team had done test surgeries on 26 pigs for three years. Since then, her team has done 47 liver transplantations in Mongolia. Recognizing that liver cancer is the most prevalent and economically disastrous cancer in Mongolia, Sergelen led the development of low-cost liver transplants in Mongolia. Now liver transplants cost MNT 10-15 million (around US$3–5 thousand). She proposed that Mongolian state health budget cover all liver transplantations. Now the state budget covers 75 percent of all liver transplantations in Mongolia.

== Awards ==
In 2017, Sergelen was honored by the American College of Surgeons with the Honorary Fellowship award for her commitment to treating the people of her country Mongolia. The American College of Surgeons praised that

Sergelen has contributed to modern surgical care in Mongolia. She has worked to make surgery more accessible, despite challenges such as geography, political and financial constraints, and a large nomadic population. She has led projects to improve health care in Mongolia and has provided examples for other low and middle-income countries.”
