= Bolor-Erdene Khaltar =

Mongolian author and journalist

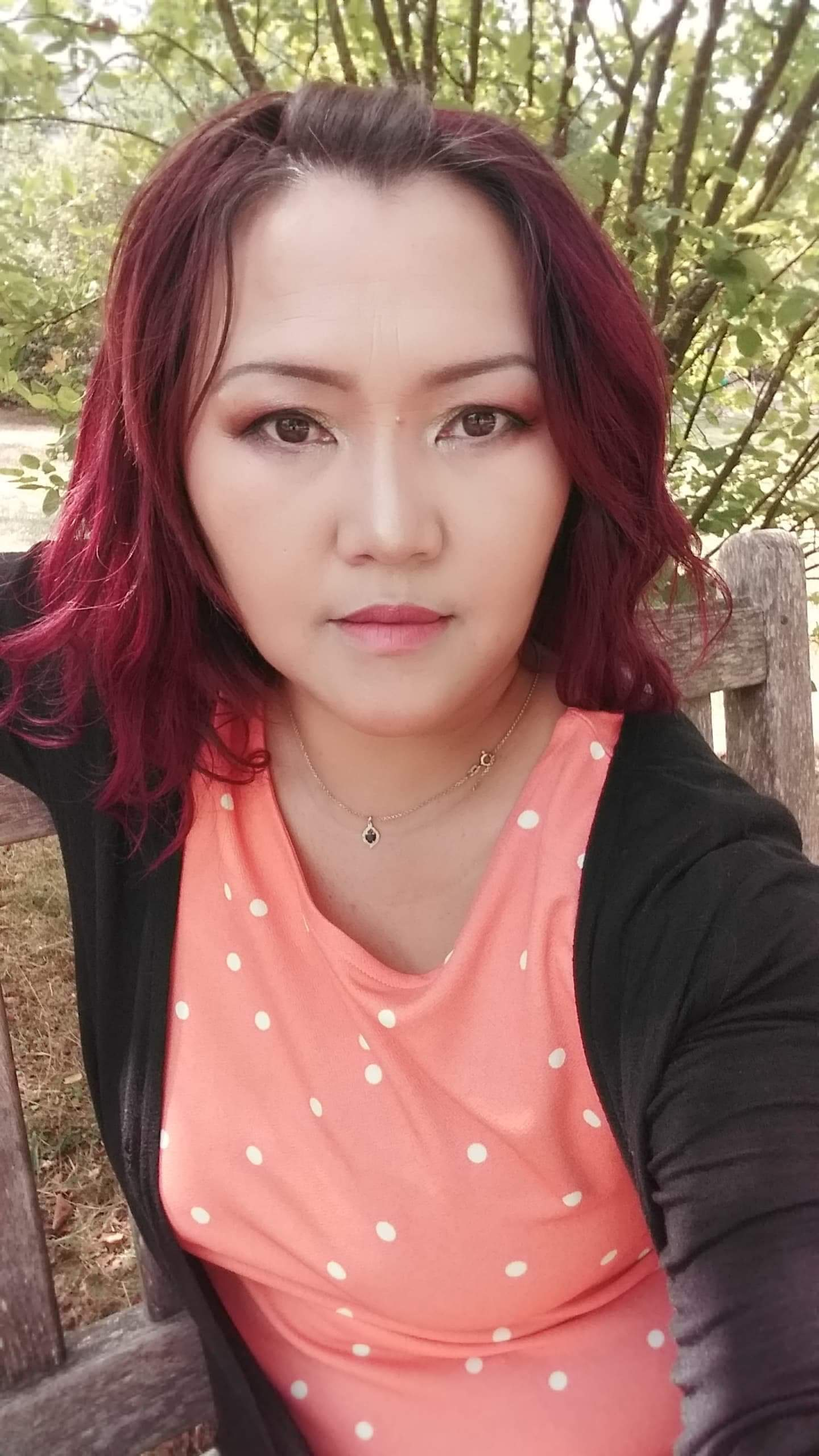
- Born: 15 August 1975 (age 51); Ulaanbaatar
- Education: National University of Mongolia

Bolor-Erdene Khaltar (born 15 August 1975, in Ulaanbaatar, Mongolia) is a Mongolian author and journalist. She studied at the National University of Mongolia during 1995 and graduated from the journalism department of the College of Literature in 2000.

After graduation, she started working at newspapers such as "Public Law", "Today", "The Word", "News of the Century" and the agency. She is a freelance journalist and writer.

She received the top literary prize of Mongolia "The Golden Feather" in 2009, with her book entitled You and me (psychological stories) and was then awarded for her book Khishigt for children in 2011. In 2019, her novella for youth Khishigt was published in France with the revised title Khishigt Mongol.

== Works ==
=== Story books ===
1. The naked night (2002)
2. Made in heart (2004)
3. The paradise prisoners (2007)
4. You and me (2009), (2013)
5. Bolor stories (2020)

=== Works for children ===
1. The Mongolian old stories 1-10 (2008)
2. The wise queens story (2011) story
3. Two Temuujin /2011/ story
4. Red man /2011/ story
5. Mother's story

=== Novellas ===
1. I love you - 2 (2009)
2. Bad man (2010)
3. Twenty years later (2010)
4. Khishigt (2011), (2012), (2013), (2018) documentary novella.
5. “Bolor novellas” (2013)

=== Romans ===
1. The running woman (2019)
1. "I’ll Love You Until the Fairytale Ends" (2023)

=== Screenplays ===
1. I love you-2 (2009)
2. Mi-15 (2010)
3. The color of Sun (2012)
4. The living partner (2014)

=== Letters ===
1. The letter to my daughter's future love
2. The letter to my son's future love

=== Lyrics ===
1. Do not cry girl; singer Ariunaa T.
2. I love you mom; drama song, singer Ariunaa T.
3. Stranger lady; film song, singer Ariunaa T.
4. The last song of swan; film song, singer Ariunaa T.
5. The love color; singer Ariunaa T.
6. Love to be loved; singer Sarantuya B.
7. I love that man; drama song, Evolution production.
8. The park couple; drama song, singer Tselmuun Ch.
9. You did not leave me; singer Tuul D.
10. I changed; Gala band.
11. Mi-15; film song, singer Iderjavhlan P.
12. Loving times; singer Bayartsetseg B.
13. At the cross; singer Bayartsetseg B.
14. Thought; singer Bayartsetseg B.
15. Anna Karenina; drama song, singer Maraljingoo
16. Draw me; singer Bayartsetseg B.
