= Munkhbileg Enebish =

- Энэбишийн Мѳнхбилэг
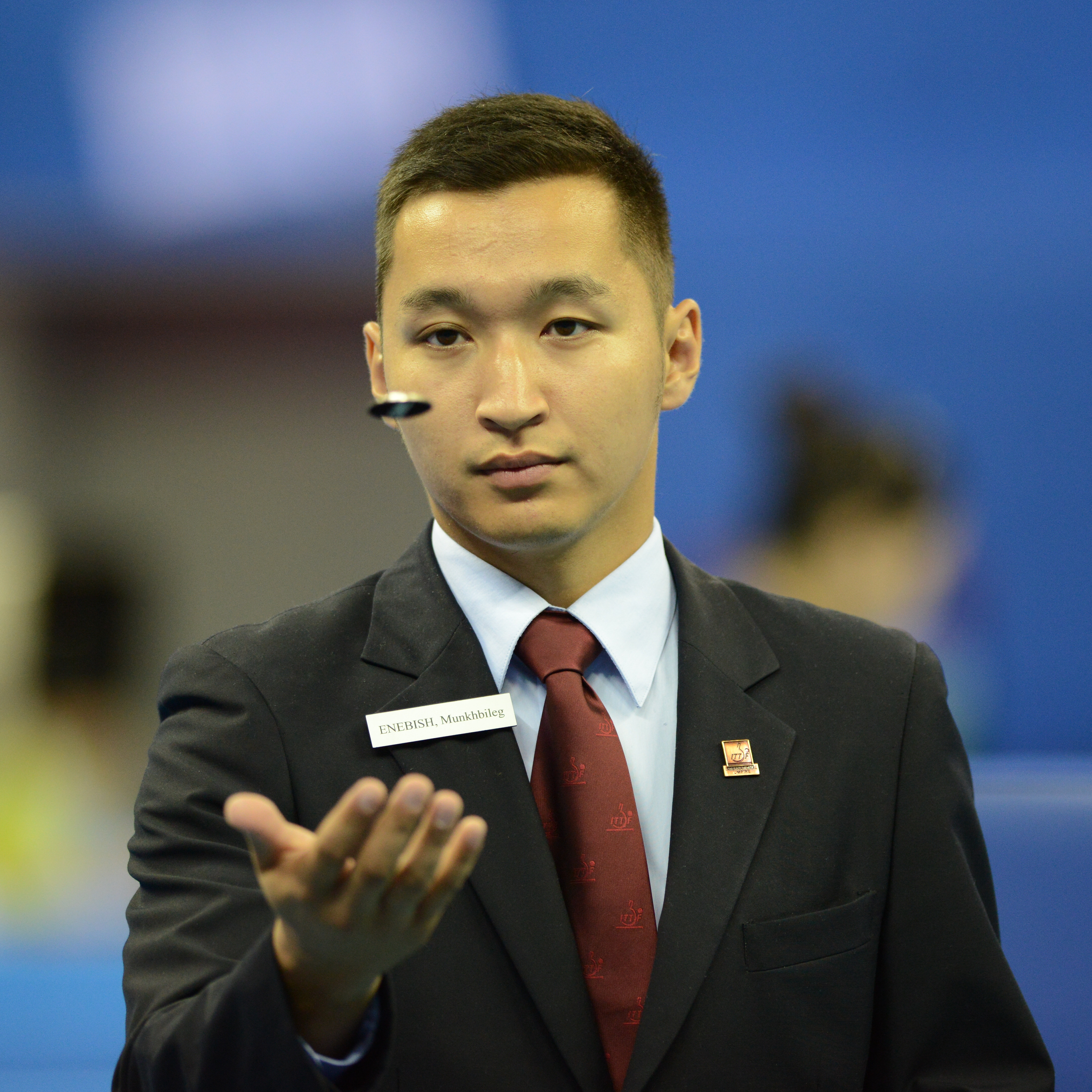
- During Gold medal match of Men's Singles in Nanjing 2014 Youth Olympic Games
- Born: October 3, 1988 (age 37); Ulaanbaatar, Mongolia
- Education: MBA International Business, LUISS Business School Bachelor of Science in Physics, National University of Mongolia
- Awards: Forbes Mongolia 30 Under 30 List /2015/ Best referee of Mongolia /2010/

Munkhbileg Enebish (born 3 October 1988) is the first Mongolian International Umpire in Table Tennis. Munkhbileg officiated in number of international events including Singapore 2010 Youth Olympic Games as well as Nanjing 2014 Youth Olympic Games. He attended National University of Mongolia for BS degree and LUISS Business School of Italy for MBA International Business.

== Personal life ==
Munkhbileg Enebish was raised in Ulaanbaatar, Mongolia, but pursued USA to attend Albany High School in California. After completing high school, he returned to his home country continue his study in School of Physics and Electronics of National University of Mongolia. Munkhbileg started his work career in Institute of Physics and Technology of Mongolian Academy of Science right after his graduation. After working for one year, Munkhbileg decided to begin his own business and moved to Abu Dhabi, UAE, where he lived with his family for 2 years.

Munkhbileg Enebish received scholarship to study in LUISS Business School of Italy, and after completing two-year study in Rome, he received MBA International Business degree.

== Work ==
From 2017 to 2018, Munkhbileg worked as a World Bank Consultant of Renewable Energy project in Mongolia.

In summer of 2018, he was appointed as Director General of Physical activity and Sports Policy Department of Ministry of Education, Culture, Science and Sports of Mongolia. Munkhbileg Enebish started playing table tennis in 1999.

== Table Tennis ==
He became one of the first International Umpires from Mongolia in 2010.

He was elected as Full Member of Technical and Umpires Committee of Asian Table Tennis Union.

Since 2022, he was appointed as Competition Manager of Asian Table Tennis Union events.
