= Batchimeg Migeddorj =

Mongolian diplomat and politician (1973–2020)

Batchimeg Migeddorj (January 26, 1973 – October 17, 2020; Mongolian: Мигэддоржийн Батчимэг) was a Mongolian diplomat and politician. A foreign affairs expert, from 2009 to 2012 she served as a national security advisor to the Mongolian president, and from 2012 to 2016 she was an elected member of parliament.

== Biography ==
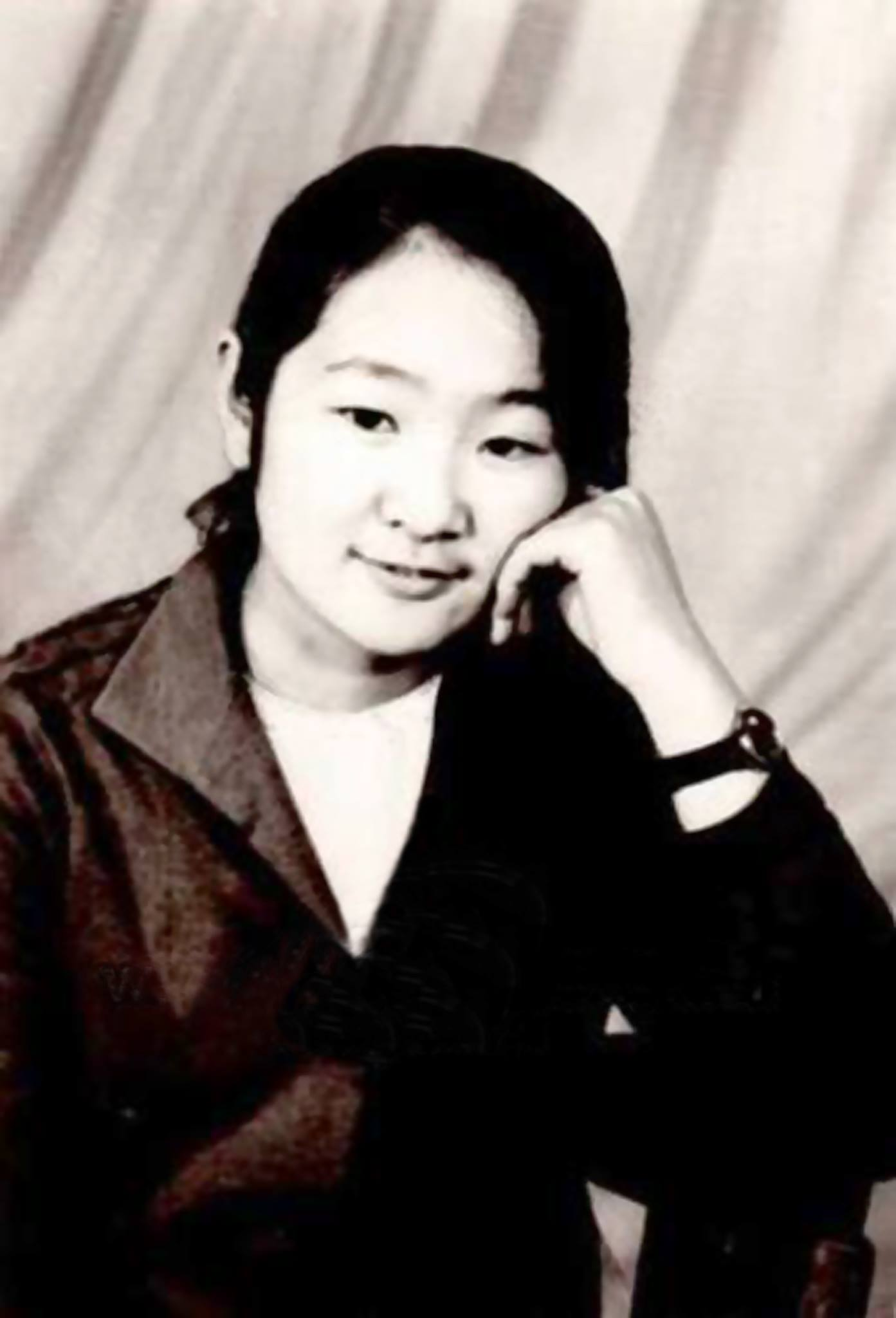
Batchimeg Migeddorj during her secondary school years.

Batchimeg Migeddorj was born in 1973 in Taragt, a district in Mongolia's Övörkhangai province. Her father was an engineer, and her mother was a teacher.

After completing secondary school in the provincial capital of Arvaikheer in 1990, she briefly attended the University of the Humanities before transferring to the Beijing Language and Culture University, where she graduated in 1995. In 1999, she obtained a master's degree in political science from Mongolia's National Defense University. She also later pursued Ph.D. studies at National Taiwan University.

Batchimeg spent a decade from 1995 to 2005 as a senior researcher at the Institute for Strategic Studies of Mongolia. Her research focused on China and other major powers' relations in Northeast Asia, as well as U.S. relations with countries in the region. In 2005, she left the Institute for Strategic Studies to serve as Mongolia's trade and economic representative in Taipei, a role she held until 2008. She returned to the Institute as a consultant from 2008 to 2009.

In 2009, Batchimeg was named a national security policy advisor to Mongolian President Tsakhiagiin Elbegdorj. She served the president in this capacity until 2012. During her tenure as a national security advisor, in 2010, the Asia Society selected her as a member of its Asia 21 fellowship program.

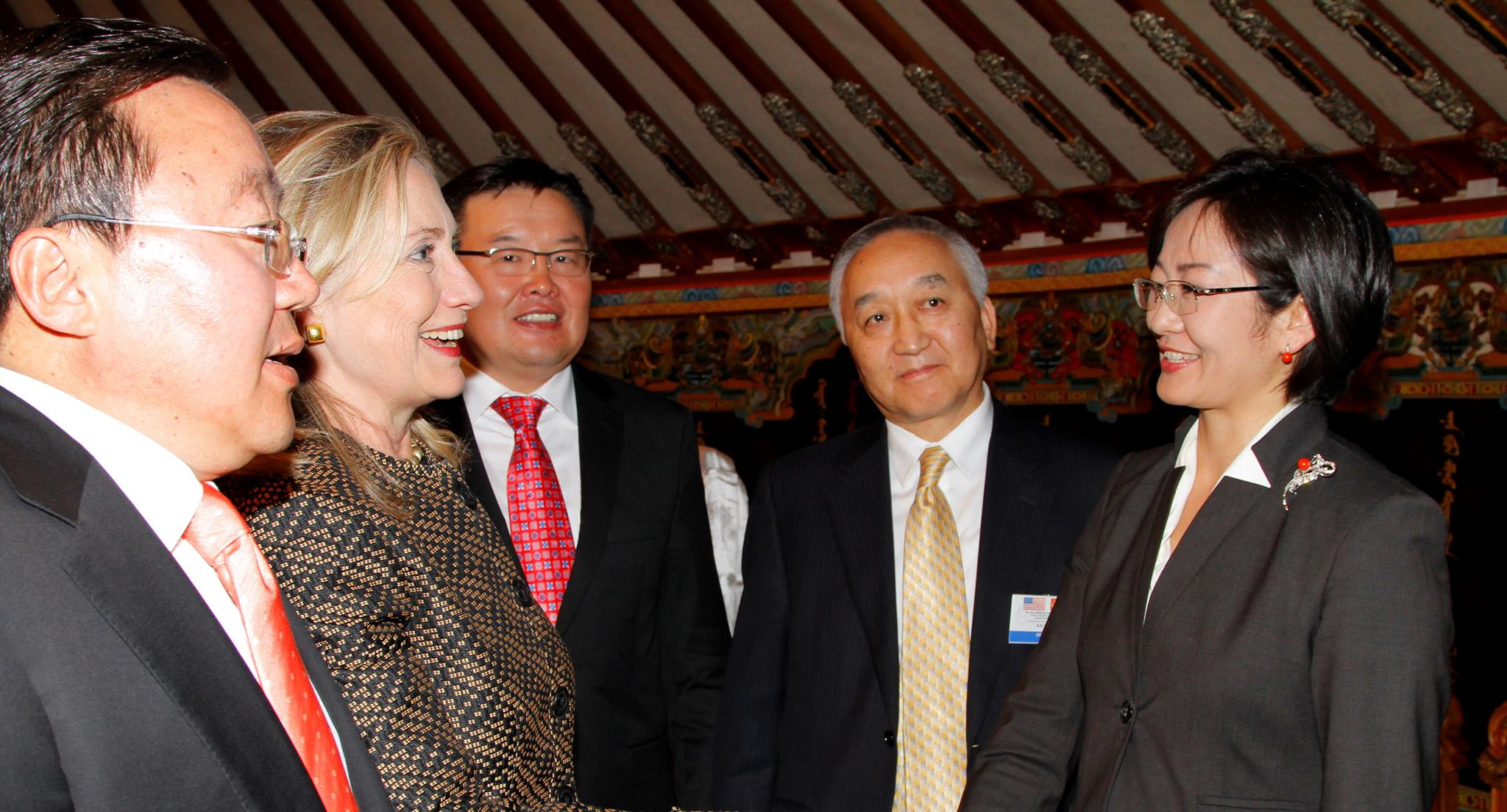
Batchimeg and then-U.S. Secretary of State Hillary Clinton during the latter's visit to Mongolia in 2012.

Then, in the 2012 Mongolian legislative election, she was elected a member of the Mongolian parliament, becoming one of nine women serving in the body as of March 2013. She had run in the election as a member of the Democratic Party, and she served on the party's National Consultative Committee.

While in office, Batchimeg focused on foreign and defense policy, as well as such issues as child care, traffic safety, and the Mongolian language. She was also active in efforts to reform the Constitution of Mongolia, continuing her involvement after losing her seat in the 2016 Mongolian legislative election, until the amendments were adopted in 2019.

During her career, she also founded the Ulaanbaatar Center for Policy Research and a publishing house, Aurug Publishing.

Batchimeg died in 2020 after a long illness.
