= Tserenbaltavyn Sarantuyaa =

Mongolian social scientist, lawyer and writer

- Цэрэнбалтавын Сарантуяа
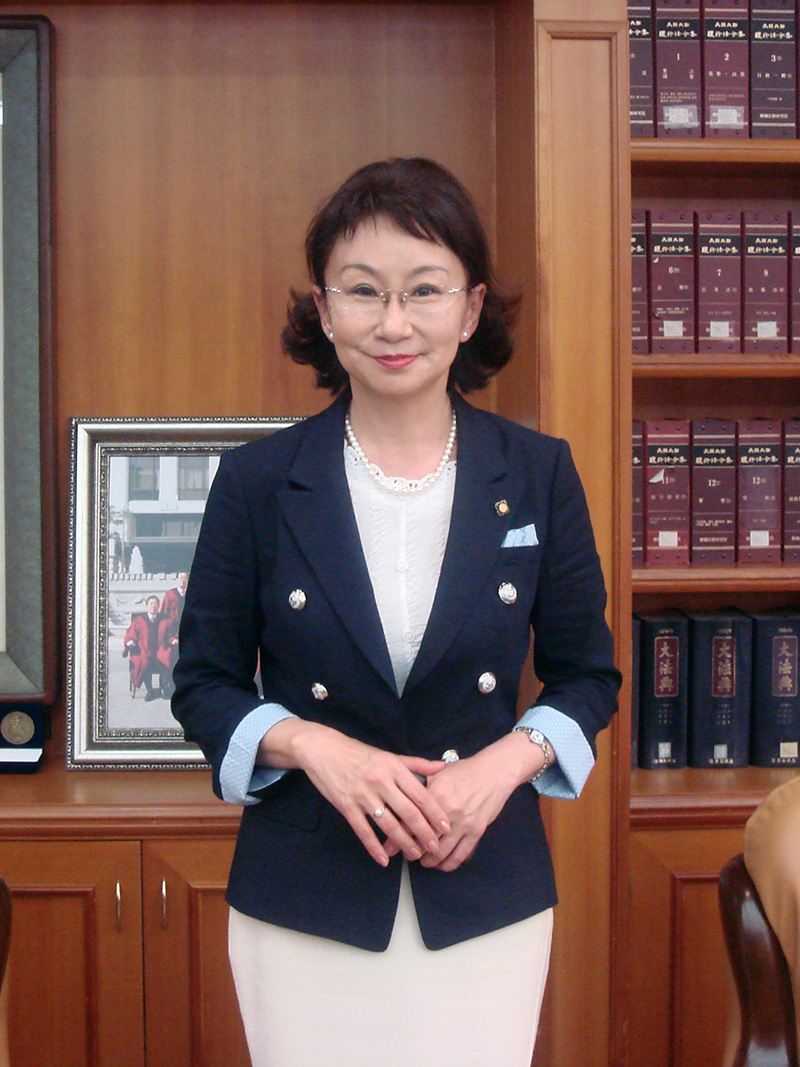
- Sarantuya Tserenbaltav on an official visit in Korea in 2012
- Born: 1959 (age 66–67); Ulaanbaatar
- Awards: Order of Merit of the Federal Republic of Germany

Academic background
- Education: Voronezh State University (law degree); Martin Luther University Halle-Wittenberg (PhD)

Academic work
- Institutions: National University of Mongolia

Tserenbaltavyn Sarantuyaa (Mongolian: Цэрэнбалтавын Сарантуяа; born 1959) is a Mongolian social scientist, lawyer, writer and an expert of Constitutional law. She received the Order of Merit of the Federal Republic of Germany in 2013.

== Biography ==
Born in the Mongolian capital Ulaanbaatar in 1959, Sarantuyaa received her degree in law from the Russian Voronezh State University in 1981. She went to Germany to do her doctorate from Martin Luther University of Halle-Wittenberg (1987). The same year she became a professor of law at the Legal Institute of National University of Mongolia with specialisation in Constitutional law and Constitutional procedure.

Since 1992, Sarantuyaa has been a project manager for the Mongolian branch of Hanns Seidel Foundation. From 1998 to 2001, she acted as an arbitrator for the Mongolian Chamber of Commerce. She was appointed a member of the Constitutional Commission of Mongolia in June 2001 and after receiving an extension in November 2007 served in that capacity till 2013. In recognition of her work in the field of law, she was awarded the Order of Merit of the Federal Republic of Germany in April 2013.
