= Center for the Development of People with Disabilities =

Center for disabled people in Darkhan, Darkhan-Uul, Mongolia

- Хөгжлийн Бэрхшээлтэй Хүний Хөгжлийн Төв
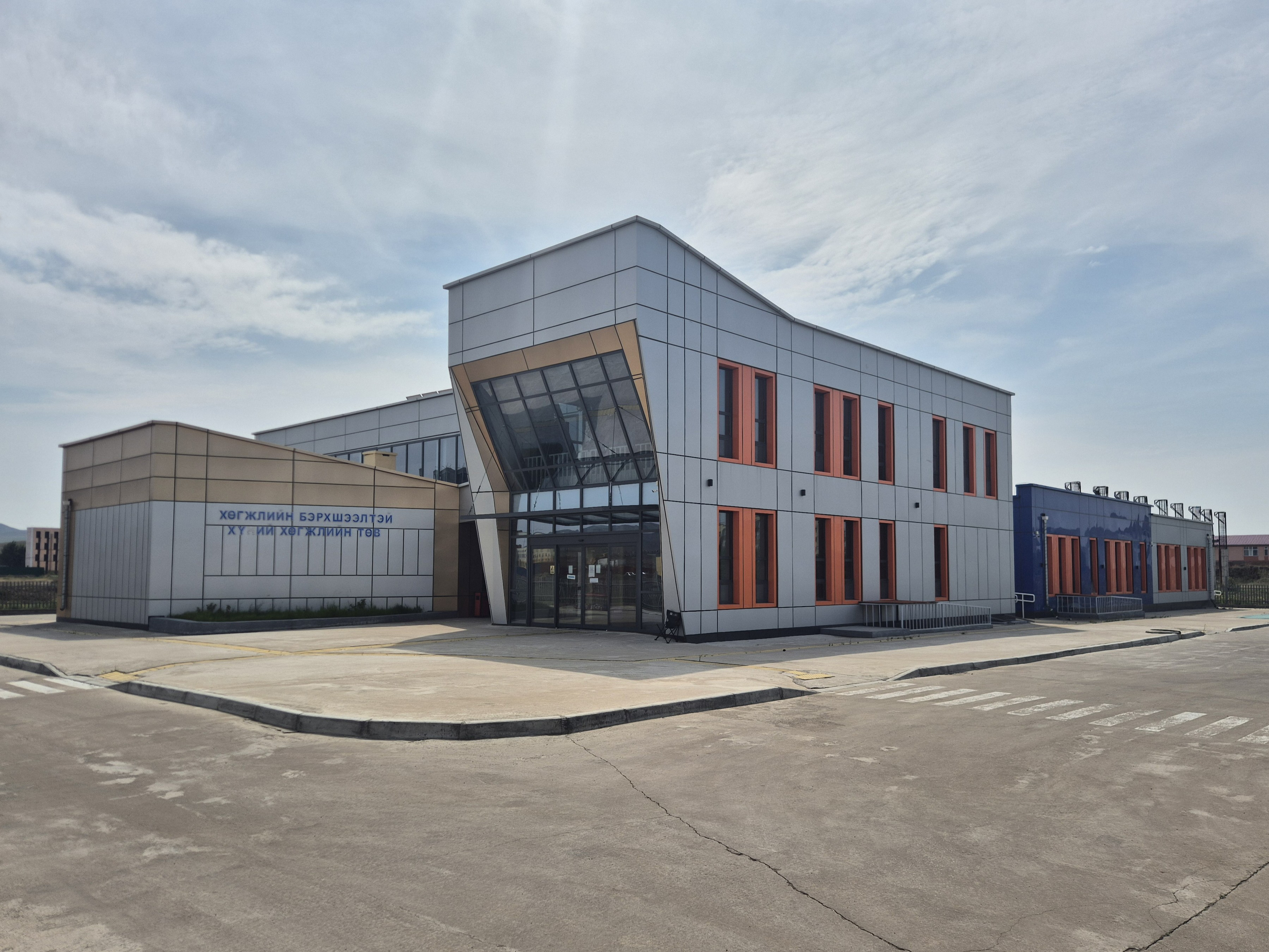

General information
- Type: center for disabled people
- Location: Darkhan, Mongolia
- Coordinates: 49°27′58.8″N 105°58′24.2″E
- Opened: January 2024
- Inaugurated: 14 September 2023

The Center for the Development of People with Disabilities (Mongolian: Хөгжлийн Бэрхшээлтэй Хүний Хөгжлийн Төв) is a center for people with disabilities in Darkhan, Darkhan-Uul Province, Mongolia.

== History ==
The center was officially inaugurated during a ceremony held on 14 September 2023 attended by Prime Minister Luvsannamsrain Oyun-Erdene. It was then fully opened in January 2024.

== Activities ==
The center provides various services for the disabled people, such as physical therapy, speech therapy, occupational therapy and various other psychological supports.

== Finance ==
The center was financed by US$25 million loan from the Asian Development Bank and US$2 million grant from Japan Fund for Prosperous and Resilient Asia and the Pacific.

== See also ==
- Disability in Mongolia
