= Mongolian National University (established 1998) =

Private university in Ulaanbaatar, Mongolia

- Монгол Үндэсний Их Сургууль; Mongol Ündesnii Ikh Surguuli
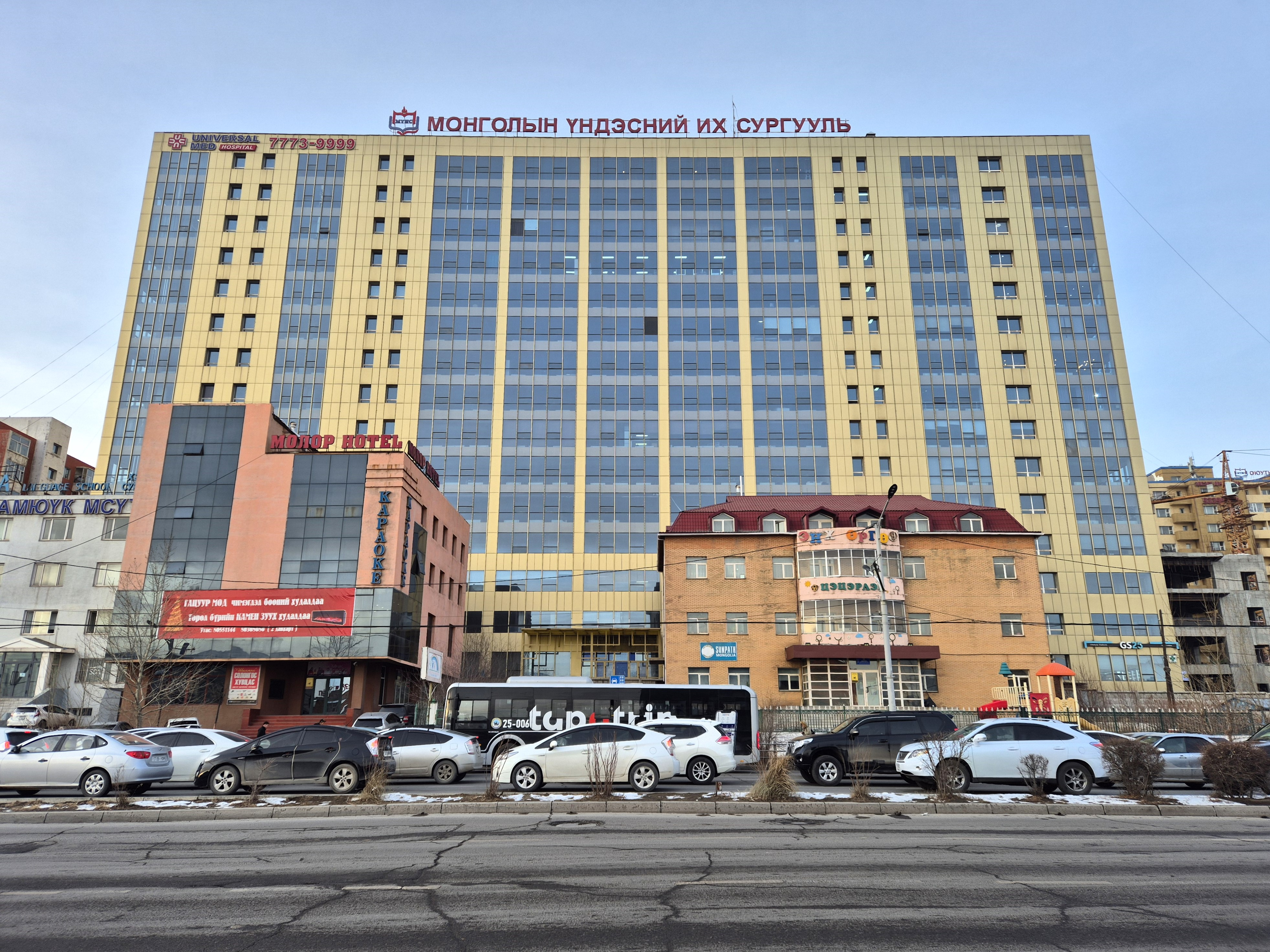
- Motto: Шинэ эриний төгс удирдагчидыг бид бэлдэнэ Shine erinii tögs udirdagchidyg bid beldene
- Type: Mongolian National University
- Established: 1998; 28 years ago
- President: L.Munkhbat
- Faculty: 589
- Location: Ulaanbaatar, Mongolia; 47.9232°N 106.9218°E
- Colors: Blue, Red & White
- Nickname: МHҮ (MNU)
- Website: mnun.edu.mn

The Mongolian National University (Mongolian: Монгол Үндэсний Их Сургууль) is a private university in Ulaanbaatar, Mongolia. Established in 1998 as Chandmani-Erdene College, it was renamed Mongolian National College in 2002, Mongolian National Institute in 2004, and Mongolian National University in 2012.

== Background ==
MNU has several campus locations in and outside Ulaanbaatar and operates cooperative, corporate and academic relationships with over 100 universities in over 26 different countries. This includes research institutions and various partners concerning student exchange programs, faculty exchange programs, joint research, and other co-sponsored academic activities. MNU serves as a leader among post -secondary institutions in Mongolia in that it trains its students to create and incubate their own startups.

Mongolian National University's academic curriculum gives current and prospective students a quality theory and practice in multiple languages (Mongolian, English, Korean, Chinese, Russian and other academic language options) in order for students to build towards solid life and workplace fluency.

== History ==
Established in 1998, the Mongolian National University (MNU) is the largest non-governmental university in Mongolia. MNU has multiple faculties, schools of learning and academic programs.

In 2019, over 14,000 undergraduate and graduate students from all Mongolian provinces chose MNU as their university. MNU has 50 different faculties, departments and schools. Students can select from the 100 undergraduate, graduate and postgraduate programs at the MNU. Over 8100 students have graduated from MNU. Over ninety percent of MNU graduates are employed. Primarily in the private sphere.

MNU has various cooperation agreements with university partners from South Korea, Russia, China, Japan, the United States, Taiwan, Norway, Italy, India and Canada. As a result, MNU offers numerous student exchange programs and faculty exchanges for lectures, academic studies and assorted research work.

== Criticism ==
Mongolian National University (MNU) and the National University of Mongolia (NUM) have sometimes been taken for the same university. NUM serves as a public or government university, whereas MNU is a private innovation university. Each university has its own unique geography and campus locales. The two universities have their own unique institutional visions, mission directions, programs and purposes.

== Trademark Dispute ==
Since 2012, the Mongolian National University (MNU) had been unlawfully using the name of the National University of Mongolia (NUM). The trademark dispute between NUM and MNU, which began in 2020, was resolved in favor of NUM in 2023. However, the issue regarding the universities' naming rights remained unsettled.

On February 4, 2025, the Supreme Court of Mongolia issued a final ruling, definitively resolving the dispute in favor of NUM. The court nullified the decisions of both the first-instance and appellate courts, dismissed MNU’s claims in their entirety, and upheld NUM’s complaint. As a result, the Mongolian National University is now prohibited from using names such as Mongolian National University, MUIS, MNU, and NUM.

The source: https://news.mn/r/2781389/

== Timeline ==
- 1998 Institution Founded
- 1999 School of Law founded
- 2000 School of Economics and Management founded
- 2004 School of Tourism Management founded
- 2005 School of International Relations founded
- 2007 School of Mathematics and Information Technology founded
- 2008 School of Mining and Construction Engineering founded
- 2010 Certified by the Global Quality Management Standard Organization
- 2011 Membership (ACBSP)
- 2013 School of Construction and Engineering founded
- 2013 School of International Management of Technology (IT) founded
- 2014 Certified by the “Grand Expo -2014” The Best University of the Year
- 2015 School of Medicine founded
- 2019 School of Nursing founded
- 2019 School of Aviation founded
- 2019 International Campus opened
- 2020 24/7 Research library (new) opened
- 2021 University Hospital Phase I laboratories opening
