= Development Center for Children with Disabilities =

Center for disabled children in Bayangol, Ulaanbaatar, Mongolia

- Хөгжлийн Бэрхшээлтэй Хүүхдийн Сэргээн Засах Хөгжлийн Төв
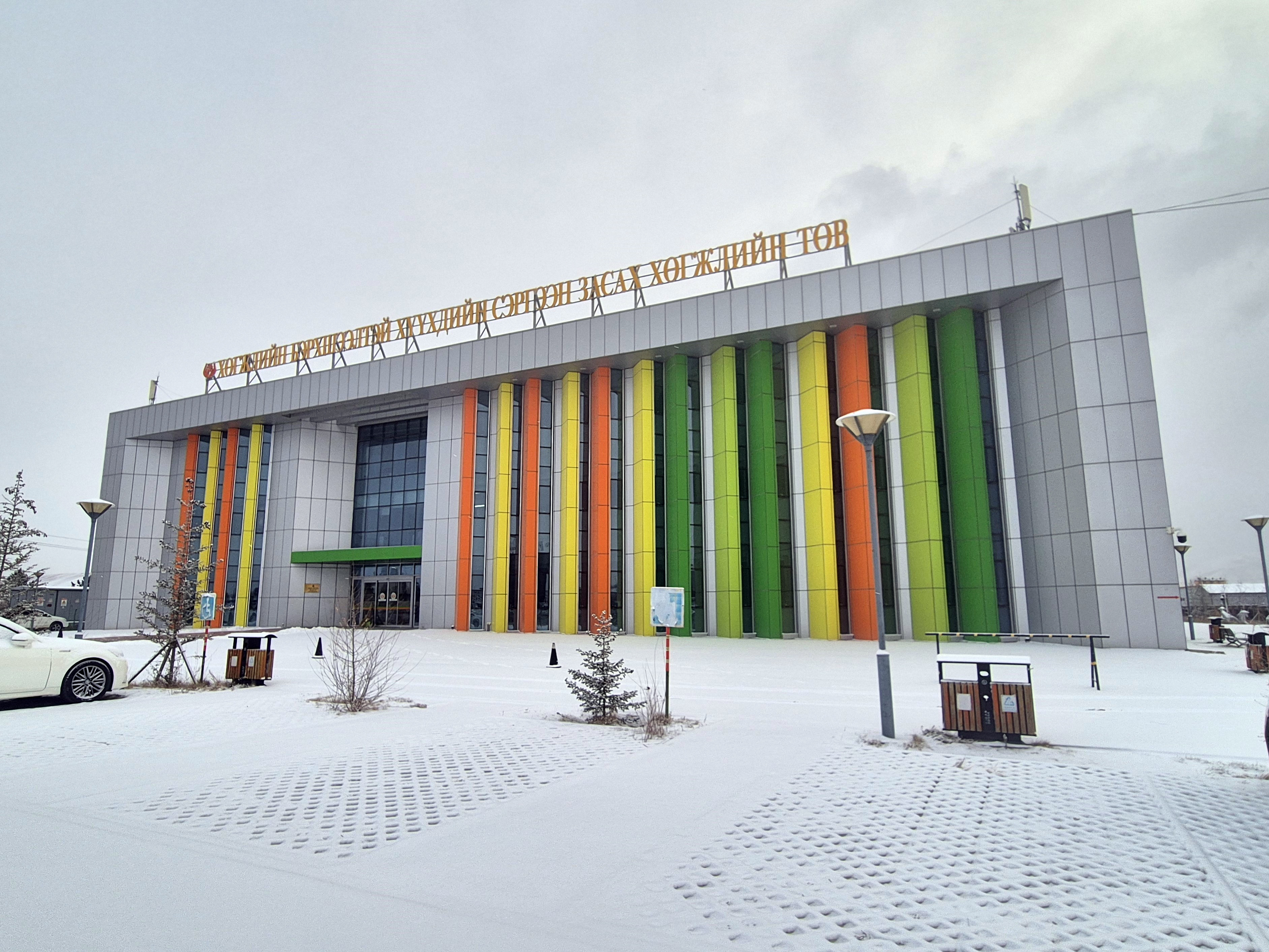
- Interactive map of the Development Center for Children with Disabilities area

General information
- Type: center for disabled children
- Location: Bayangol, Ulaanbaatar, Mongolia
- Coordinates: 47°52′59.4″N 106°47′12.9″E
- Groundbreaking: 8 September 2016
- Inaugurated: 24 January 2019

Technical details
- Floor count: 4
- Grounds: 1.5 hectares

Website
- Official website (in Mongolian)

The Development Center for Children with Disabilities (Mongolian: Хөгжлийн Бэрхшээлтэй Хүүхдийн Сэргээн Засах Хөгжлийн Төв) is a center for children with disabilities in Bayangol District, Ulaanbaatar, Mongolia.

== History ==
The construction for the center started on 8 September 2016. The center was handed over on 24 January 2019 in a ceremony attended by Chinese Ambassador Xing Haiming, Mongolian Chief of Staff Zandaakhüügiin Enkhbold and Mongolian Minister of Labor and Social Protection Sodnom Chinzorig. The center won best architecture award in 2019.

== Architecture ==
The center spans over an area of 1.5 hectares with three floors above the ground and one underground. It consists of 250 beds and can treat 250 outpatients daily.

== See also ==
- Disability in Mongolia
