= Tsetsegjargal Tseden =

- Цэцэгжаргал Цэдэн ᠴᠡᠴᠡᠭᠵᠢᠷᠭᠠᠯᠼᠡᠳᠡᠨ
- Education: National University of Mongolia
- Known for: Center for Gender Studies (founder)
- Scientific career
- Fields: Anthropology; Archaeology; Gender studies
- Institutions: National University of Mongolia; Cairo Demographic Center

Tsetsegjargal Tseden (Mongolian: Цэцэгжаргал Цэдэн; traditional script: ᠴᠡᠴᠡᠭᠵᠢᠷᠭᠠᠯ ᠼᠡᠳᠡᠨ) is an associate professor in the Department of Anthropology and Archaeology at the National University of Mongolia and a member of the Mongolian National Committee for UNESCO's Social Change Management Programme. She is known best for her research on gender issues in Mongolia.

== Career ==
Tsetsegjargal completed her BA at the National University of Mongolia in 1998. She went on to complete her MA and PhD degrees in 1999 and 2009, respectively. Whilst reading for her MA, she started teaching gender studies courses, which she continued on becoming associate professor.

In 2006, she founded the Center for Gender Studies, and since 2019 she has participated in the Mongolian National Committee for UNESCO's Social Change Management Programme.

== Honours ==
In 2016, Tsetsegjargal was honoured as a leading educator by the Ministry of Education, Culture and Science of Mongolia.

== Publications ==
- Tseden, Tsetsegjargal (2012). "Women's NGOs in Mongolia and their Role in Democratization". VNU Journal of Science: Social Sciences and Humanities. 28 (5E).
- Tseden, Tsetsegjargal (2014). "Marriage Migration of Mongolian Women to South Korea". Sociology Study. 4 (12): 1050–1059.
