= Tumen Dashtseveg =

Academic background
- Education: Moscow State University

Academic work
- Discipline: Anthropology
- Institutions: National University of Mongolia

Tumen Dashtseveg is the head of the Department of Anthropology & Archaeology, National University of Mongolia, Ulaanbaatar, Mongolia.

== Career ==
Tumen did her doctoral degree at Moscow State University in Anthropology. She specialises in paleoanthropology, human skeletal biology, paleodemography, paleopathology, racial variation and historical populations in Mongolia and North Asia.

== Bibliography ==
- Jack N. Fenner, Dashtseveg Tumen and Dorjpurev Khatanbaatar. 'Food fit for a Khan: stable isotope analysis of the elite Mongol Empire cemetery at Tavan Tolgoi, Mongolia,' Journal of Archaeological Science 46(2014): 231–244.
- 'Mongolian origins and cranio-morphometric variability,' in Pechenkina, K. and M. Oxenham, eds. Bioarchaeology of East Asia: movement, contact, health, pp. 85–109. Gainesville: University Press of Florida, 2013.
