= Togszhargalyn Gandi =

Mongolian diplomat and politician (born 1961)

- Төгсжаргалын Ганди
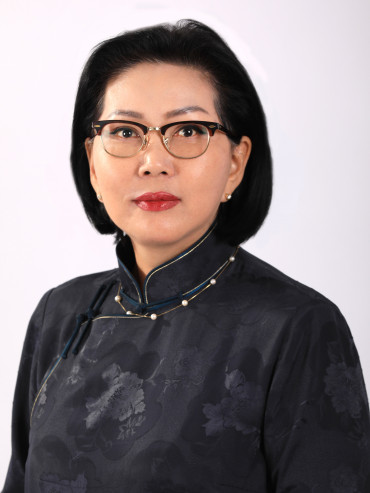
- Born: September 24, 1961 (age 64)
- Occupations: Politician, diplomat
- Political party: Mongolian People's Party

Togszhargalyn Gandi (Mongolian: Төгсжаргалын Ганди, romanized: Tögsjargalyn Gandi; born 24 September 1961) is a Mongolian diplomat and politician.

== Early life and career ==
Togszhargalyn Gandi was born on 24 September 1961 in Ulaanbaatar, Mongolia. In 1982, Gandi graduated from the National University of Mongolia majoring in Journalism. In 1986, she graduated from the Higher School of Economics. In 1991, she graduated from the School of Science of the Higher Party School. In 1992, she joined the United States Department of State's course on politics. In 1993, Gandi dedicated herself to political research in Germany. Between 1996 and 1997, she went to Thailand and India to carry out demographic research. Since 1982, she was a correspondent of the military newspaper Ulaan (Red Star) and the head editor of the youth newspapers of the Mongolian People's Party. Between 1990 and 1992, Gandi also served as a department head of Ardyn Erkh (People's Power).

== Political career ==
Between 1992 and 1996, she was elected to the State Great Khural as an independent candidate from Ulaanbaatar. She later joined the Mongolian People's Party and between 1996 to 2000 was elected to the State Great Khural in the 65th constituency (Bayangol). In 2000, she was elected to the State Great Khural in the 57th constituency (Bayanzürkh), presiding over the Standing Committee on Human Development and Social Policy. In May 1996, she joined the Mongolian People's Party's Little Khural. In 2004, she was elected to the State Great Khural in the 56th constituency (Bayanzürkh). From 2004 to 2006, she served as the Minister of Health. In June 2005, she joined the MPRP Leadership Council. In January 2006, Gandi was elected to the State Great Khural as the chair of the Standing Committee on Social Policy, Education, Culture and Science. Later in October 2007, she was chosen as the party secretary of the Mongolian People's Party. In September 2008, she was appointed the Minister of Family, Labor and Social Protection.
