= Association of Mongolian Surgeons =

Medical organization based in Mongolia

The Association of Mongolian Surgeons (AMS; Mongolian: Монголын мэс засалч эмч нарын холбоо) is a medical association established in 1990. In 2006 it had more than 300 members.

It organizes an annual scientific meeting where papers submitted by members are presented and discussed. It publishes an official journal Mongolian Surgery. It is a member of the International Federation of Surgical Colleges.

It was involved in the organisation of the World Health Organization workshop on Essential emergency surgical, procedures in resource-limited facilities in 2004.
