= Mongolian University of Life Sciences =

University in Ulaanbaatar, Mongolia

- Хөдөө Аж Ахуйн Их Сургууль ᠬᠥᠳᠡᠭᠡ ᠠᠵᠤ ᠠᠬᠤᠢ ‍ᠶᠢᠨ ᠶᠡᠬᠡ ᠰᠣᠷᠭᠠᠭᠣᠯᠢ
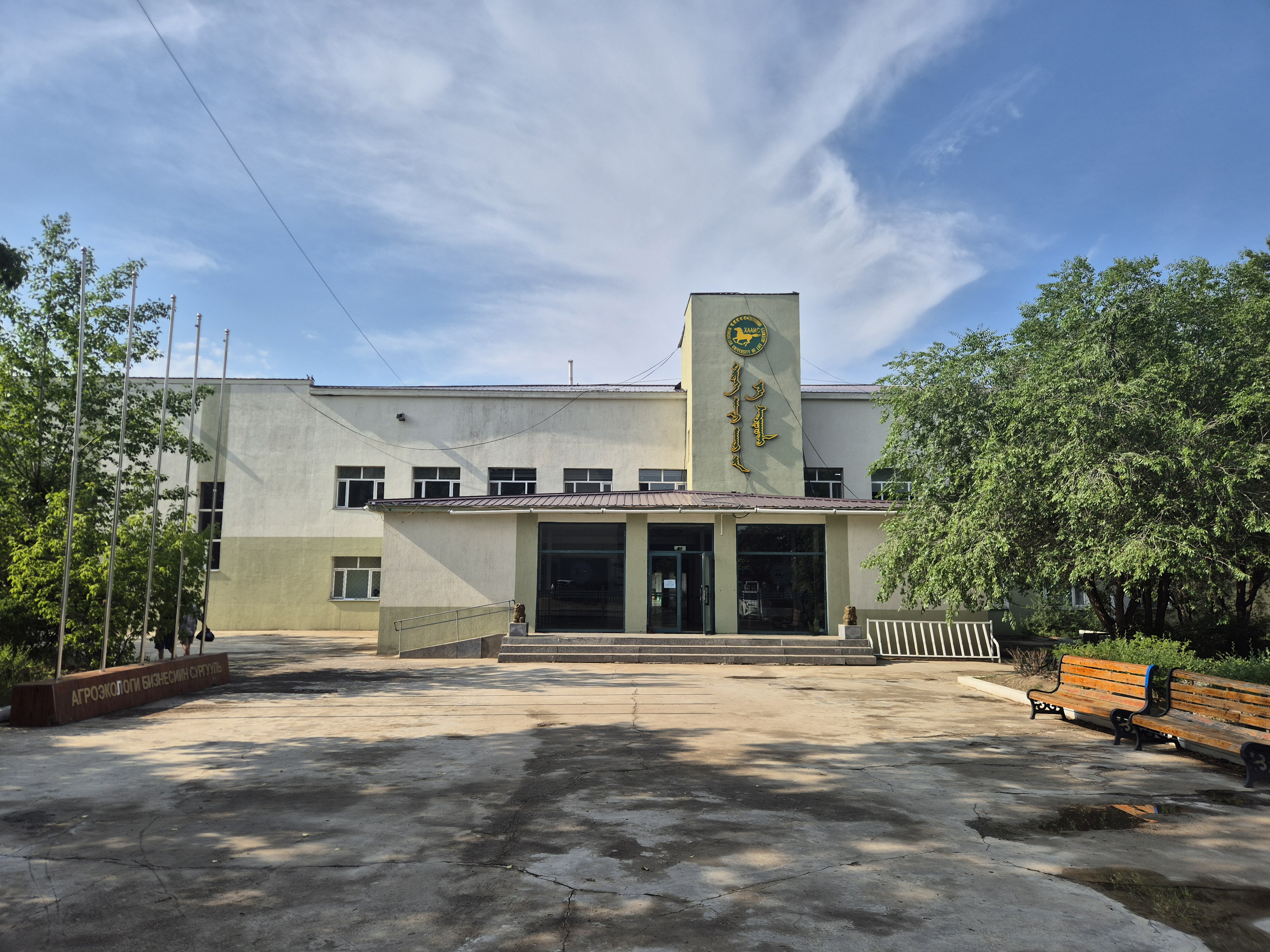
- Type: Public university
- Established: 1958; 68 years ago
- Affiliations: CMUC
- Rector: Baasansukh Badarch
- Academic staff: 405
- Undergraduates: 4,838
- Postgraduates: 3,454
- Doctoral students: 642
- Location: Ulaanbaatar, Mongolia; 47.8866°N 106.9093°E
- Campus: Ulaanbaatar (main) Darkhan, Darkhan-Uul Province
- Colors: Dark green
- Nickname: ХААИС (KhAAIS)
- Website: muls.edu.mn

The Mongolian University of Life Sciences (Mongolian: Хөдөө аж ахуйн их сургууль) (Note: Literally translates to University of Agriculture.) is a national university of Mongolia, with the main branch situated in the capital of Ulaanbaatar. It lies in the southern part of the city in the Khoroo 11 district on the southern side of the Tuul River, just to the northwest of the Zaisan Memorial and the American School of Ulan Bator.

It was formerly the veterinary faculty of the Mongolian State University and Higher School of Agriculture from 1958 but underwent structural reform in 1990 and 1993, with seven schools, four research institutes and three university branches in Orkhon Province, Dornod Province and Khovd Province since 2001. 7060 undergraduates and 1045 graduates were reported in 2008.
