= Ider University =

University in Sükhbaatar, Ulaanbaatar, Mongolia

Coordinates: 47°55′8.2″N 106°55′39.4″E

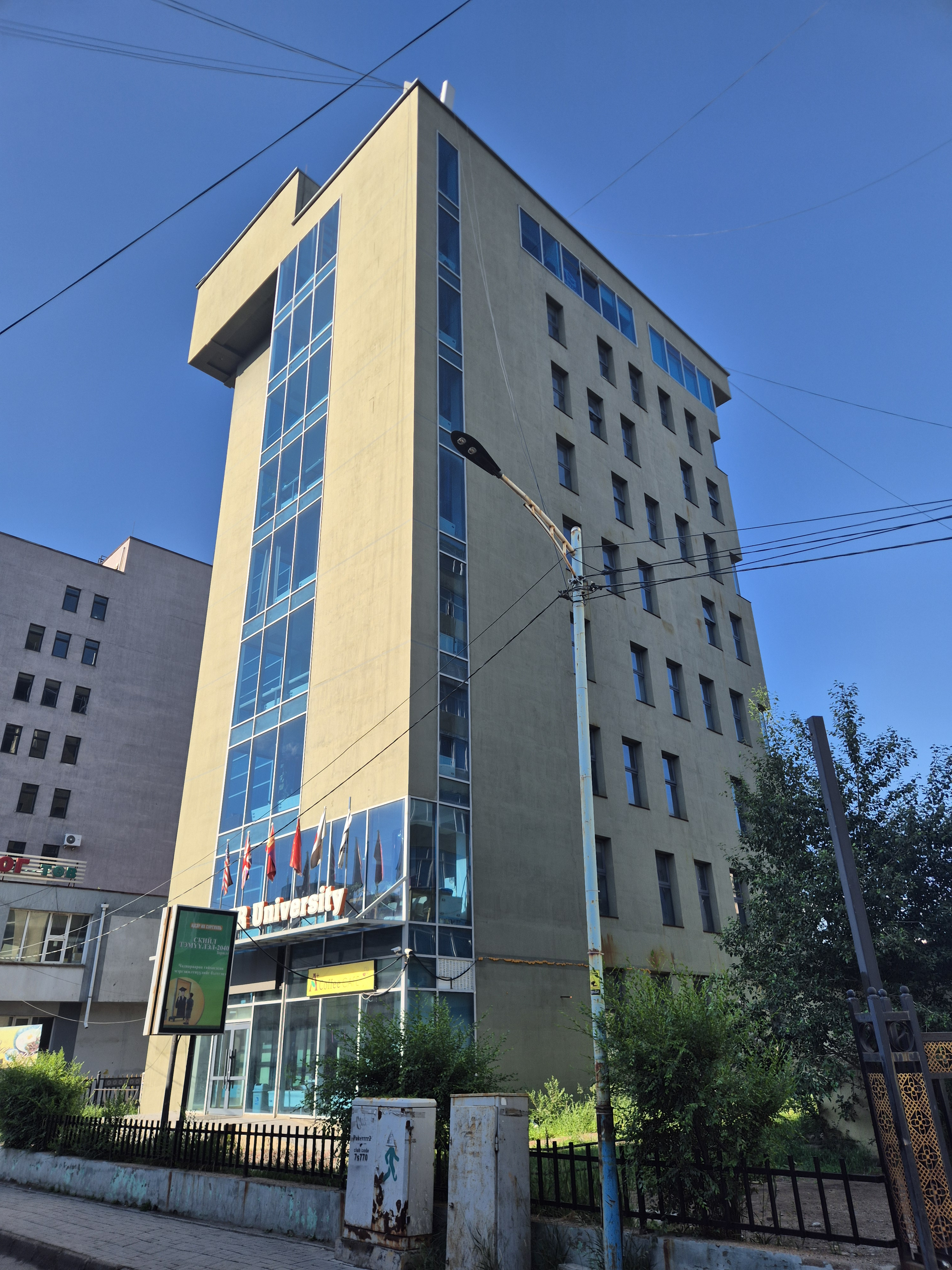
Ider University

Ider University (Mongolian: Идэр Их Сургууль) is a private institution of higher education in Sükhbaatar District, Ulaanbaatar, Mongolia.

Ider University was established in 1995 (31 years ago) and is one of the Top-10 rated Mongolian private universities. Ider is accredited by the Mongolian Ministry of Education at an Advanced Level and is also accredited by ACBSP, the Accreditation Council of Business Schools and Programs, USA (https://www.acbsp.org/default.aspx).

The school offers bachelor's and master's degrees in a number of fields, among which are English (including English teaching), Business Administration (marketing management specialization), Accounting, Sociology and Social Work, Mongolian Language and Journalism (teacher training and media specialists training), Food Production Technology and Hygiene Control, Computer Technical Engineering, Computer Software Engineering, and Tourism Management.

Ider University has online degree programs at the bachelors and masters levels. The online programs are offered completely in English. Bachelor's degrees include accounting, business administration, finance, international business and marketing. Ider also offers an MBA degree online with a specialization in leadership and management.

== Facilities ==
The campus is in downtown Ulaanbaatar. The total area of the institute is 2000 m^{2}, including a library, two computer labs, an aerobics room, a tennis room, a cafeteria, and chess and billiard rooms as well as classrooms and a dormitory adjacent to the institute. The main academic building has been newly renovated to include new student common areas, updated classrooms and state of the art technology.

== Accreditation ==
Ider is accredited by the Mongolian Ministry of Education at an Advanced Level. In 2014 Ider University received accreditation by ACBSP for its accounting and business programs.

== External relationships ==
Ider has international partnerships around the world including universities and higher education organizations. These partnerships include:

- LeTourneau University, USA
- Accreditation Council for Business Schools and Programs (ACBSP), USA
- Lincoln Memorial University, USA
- Association of Business Executives, London, England
- Brenau University, USA
- Chifeng University, China
- Kyonggi University, South Korea
- Open Society Institute (Soros Foundation), USA

=== American partnerships ===
Ider University has agreements with several universities in the United States for student exchange, faculty exchange, and curriculum development. In February, 2013, Ider signed an agreement with Lincoln Memorial University for student and faculty exchange. Ider has also signed partnerships with LeTourneau University and Brenau University for student and faculty exchange.
