= Consortium of Mongolian Universities and Colleges =

Consortium of higher-education institutions in Mongolia

Consortium of Mongolian Universities and Colleges (CMUC)
- Монголын их, дээд сургуулиудын консорциум (МИДСК)
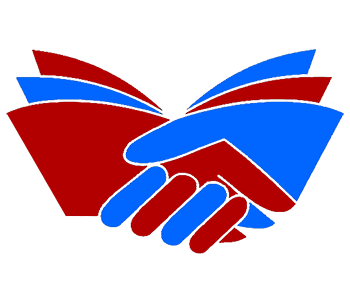
- Formation: 1995
- Type: Nonprofit organisation
- Headquarters: Ulaanbaatar
- Location: Mongolia
- Members: 53
- Website: ees.edu.mn

The Consortium of Mongolian Universities and Colleges (CMUC; Mongolian: Монголын их, дээд сургуулиудын консорциум) is a consortium of higher-education institutions in Mongolia. Established in 1995, it is a non-governmental organization dedicated to enhance cooperation, innovation and creativity in higher education development in Mongolia.

With the original members comprising most of Mongolia's state-run institutions, namely the Mongolian University of Science and Technology, Mongolian State University of Education, Mongolian National University of Medical Sciences, Mongolian State University of Agriculture, and the Mongolian State University of Arts and Culture, as of May 2020 it has 53 members.
