= Mongolian National University of Education =

University in Sükhbaatar, Ulaanbaatar, Mongolia

- Монгол Улсын Боловсролын Их Сургууль ᠮᠣᠩᠭᠣᠯ ᠤᠯᠤᠰ ‍ᠤᠨ ᠪᠣᠯᠪᠠᠰᠤᠷᠠᠯ ‍ᠤᠨ ᠶᠡᠬᠡ ᠰᠣᠷᠭᠠᠭᠣᠯᠢ
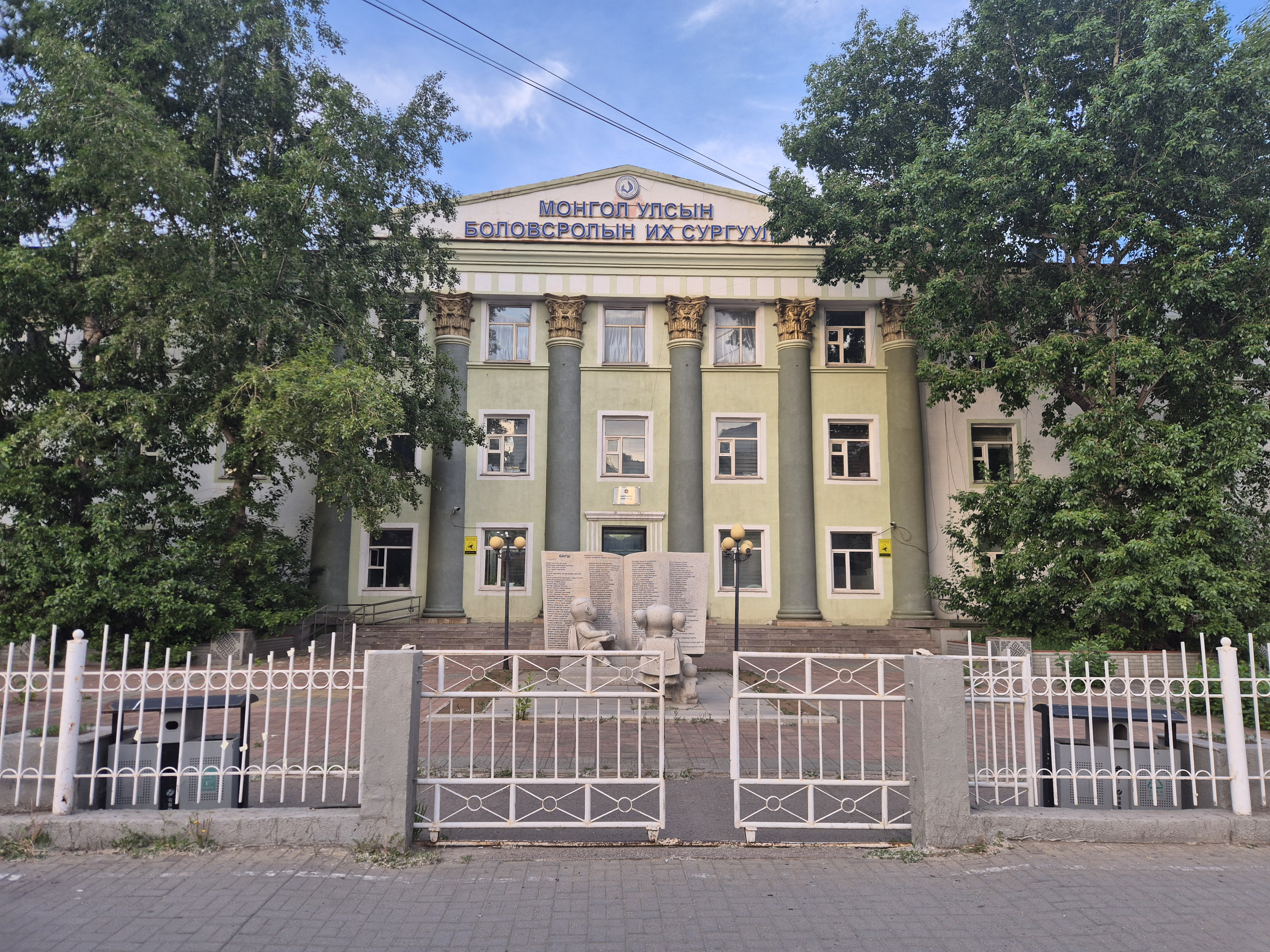
- Motto: Creative Teachers are the key to development.
- Type: Public university
- Established: 1951; 75 years ago
- Affiliations: CMUC
- President: Jamiyansurengiin Batbaatar
- Academic staff: 523
- Administrative staff: 383
- Students: 13,500
- Undergraduates: 11,590 (Spring 2020)
- Postgraduates: 1,386 (Spring 2020)
- Doctoral students: 169 (Spring 2020)
- Location: Sükhbaatar, Ulaanbaatar; 47.9183°N 106.9244°E
- Campus: Ulaanbaatar (main) Tsetserleg, Arkhangai
- Nickname: МУБИС (MUBIS)
- Website: www.msue.edu.mn

Mongolian National University of Education (MNUE; Mongolian: Монгол Улсын Боловсролын Их Сургууль) is a public university located in Sükhbaatar District, Ulaanbaatar, Mongolia. The university was established in 1951.

== History ==
Mongolian National University of Education was established in 1951 as a platform to prepare secondary education teachers. Currently the university has 12 branch education studies schools. The 1990 democratization of Mongolia is considered as a significant turning point in the history of the college.

== Structure ==
The university is accredited by Mongolian National Council for Education Accreditation and by ASIIN in 2018 and by ACQUIN 2021 and 2024. There are 9 schools, 42 departments, 11 research centers, and 35 labs. The university offers both undergraduate and postgraduate courses. The university has 13,500 students and 900 faculty and staff.

== International collaboration ==
The university is a member of the University of the Arctic. UArctic is an international cooperative network based in the Circumpolar Arctic region, consisting of more than 200 universities, colleges, and other organizations with an interest in promoting education and research in the Arctic region. ERASMUS with The Eugeniusz Geppert Academy of Art and Design in Wroclaw from 2024.

== Notable alumni ==
- Uchral Nyam-Osor
