= Mongolian National University of Medical Sciences =

Medical higher education institution in Sükhbaatar, Ulaanbaatar, Mongolia

Mongolian National University of Medical Science
- Анагаахын Шинжлэх Ухааны Үндэсний Их Сургууль ᠠᠨᠠᠭᠠᠬᠤ ᠶᠢᠨ ᠰᠢᠨᠵᠢᠯᠡᠬᠦ ᠤᠬᠠᠭᠠᠨ ᠤ ᠦᠨᠳᠦᠰᠦᠨ ᠦ ᠶᠡᠬᠡ ᠰᠣᠷᠭᠠᠭᠣᠯᠢ
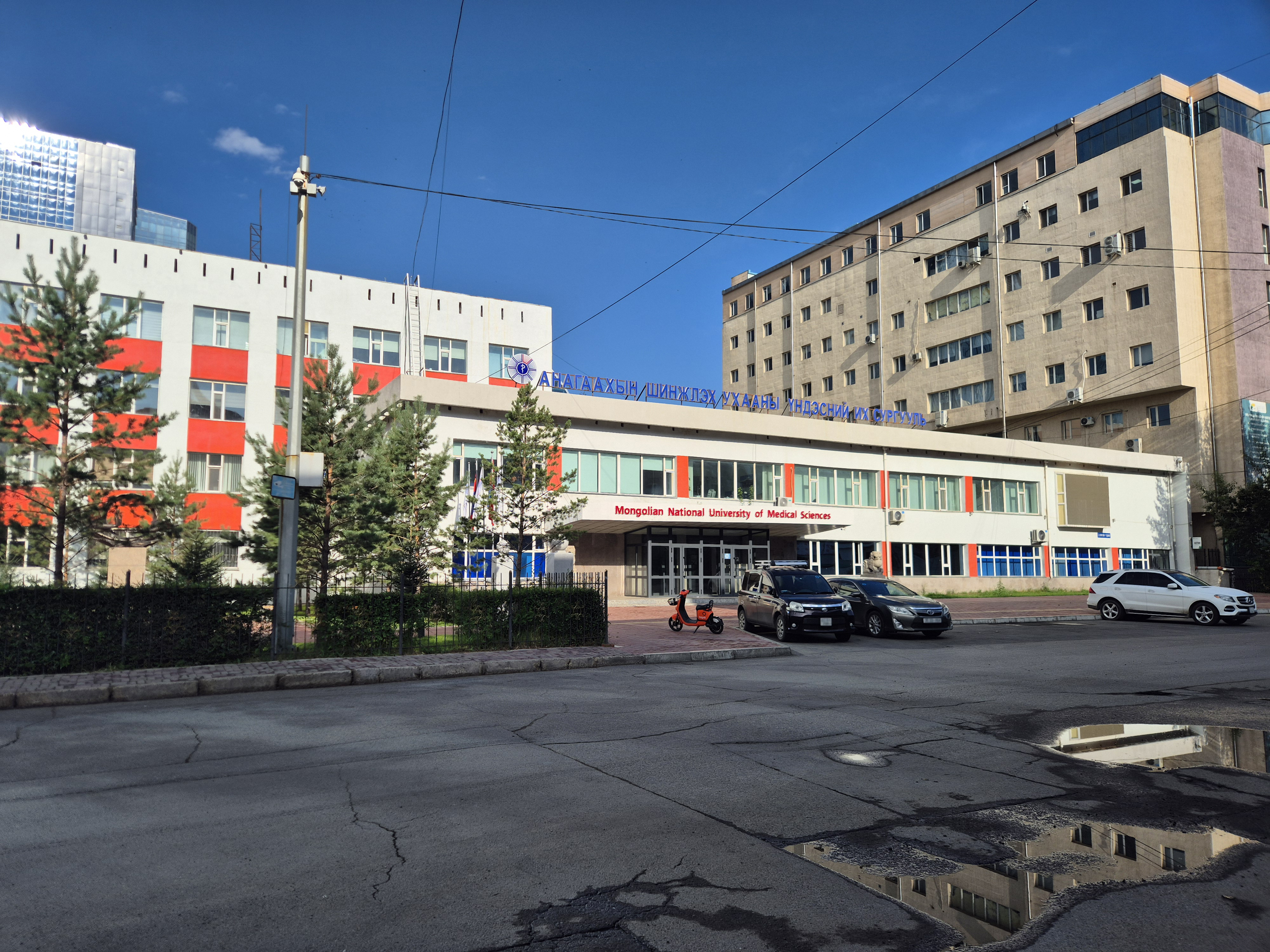
- Type: Public university
- Established: 1942; 84 years ago
- Affiliations: CMUC, IAU, CIEE, EAUN ASIIN
- Rector: Nyamdavaagiin Khürelbaatar
- Academic staff: ~1000
- Undergraduates: 8,505 (Spring 2020)
- Postgraduates: 987 (Spring 2020)
- Doctoral students: 53 (Spring 2020)
- Location: Sükhbaatar, Ulaanbaatar, Mongolia; 47.9231°N 106.9213°E
- Campus: Ulaanbaatar (main) Sainshand, Dornogovi Altai, Govi-Altai Darkhan, Darkhan-Uul
- Colors: Blue
- Nickname: АШУҮИС (MNUMS)
- Website: www.mnums.edu.mn

The Mongolian National University of Medical Sciences (Note: (Mongolian: Анагаахын Шинжлэх Ухааны Үндэсний Их Сургууль, formerly Health Sciences University of Mongolia)) is a public medical university located in Sükhbaatar, Ulaanbaatar, Mongolia. Established in 1942, it is the oldest medical school in the country. It has branch campuses in Darkhan-Uul, Sainshand, and Gobi-Altai. About 150 to 205 students graduate from the university each year.

Its school of Public Health has close links with Loma Linda University, which is sponsoring tobacco-control research there. It is affiliated with the International University of Health and Welfare in Narita where students can gain clinical experience.

== Notable alumni ==
- Orgoi Sergelen
