= Mongolian University of Science and Technology =

University in Ulaanbaatar, Mongolia

Coordinates: 48°32′19″N 107°32′39″E

- Шинжлэх ухаан, технологийн их сургуульᠰᠢᠨᠵᠢᠯᠡᠬᠦ ᠤᠬᠠᠭᠠᠨ᠂ ᠲᠧᠭᠨᠣᠯᠣᠭᠢ ‍ᠶᠢᠨ ᠶᠡᠬᠡ ᠰᠣᠷᠭᠠᠭᠣᠯᠢ
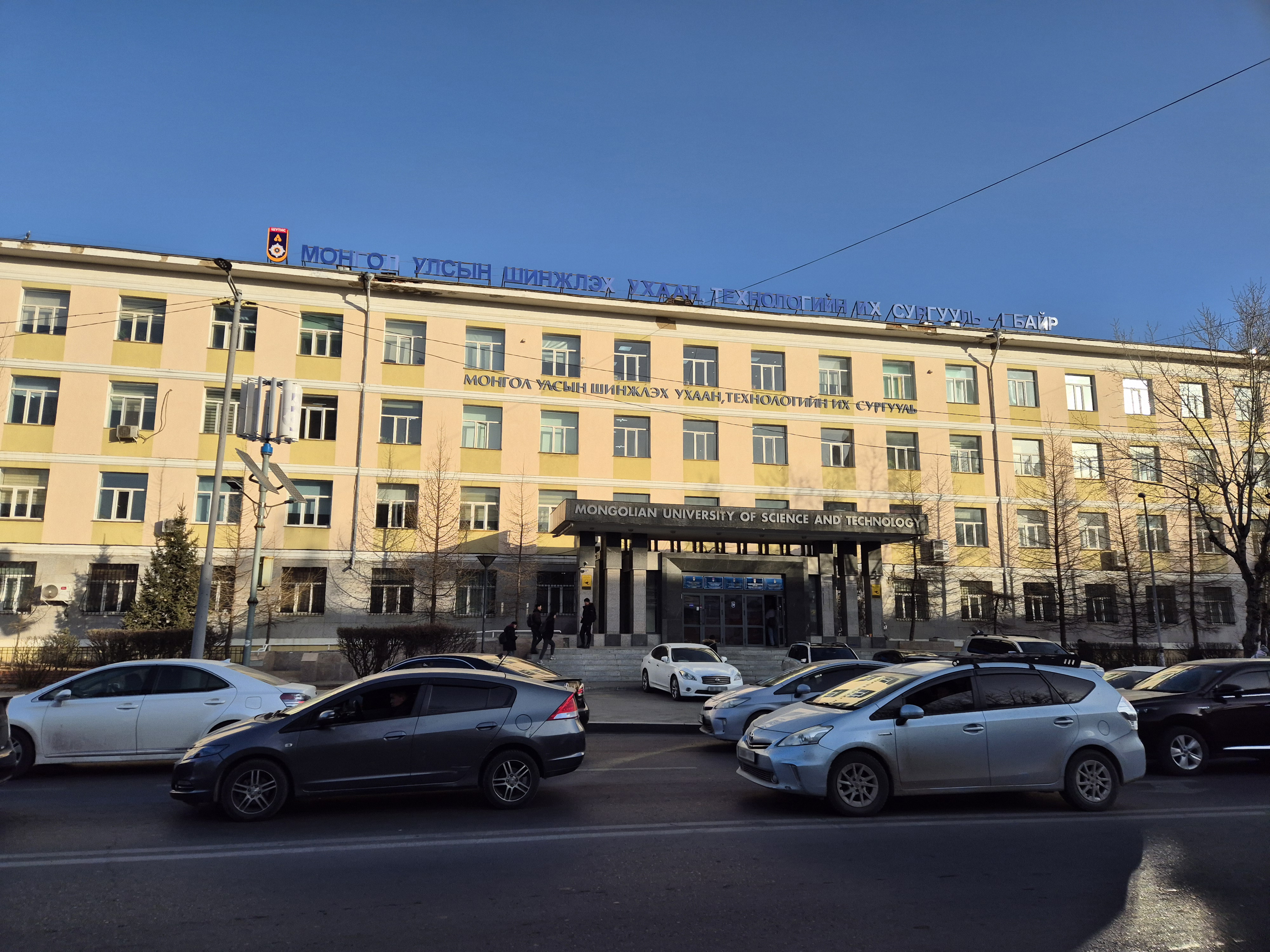
- Motto: Дэлхийд үнэлэгдэх оюуны үнэ цэнийг бүтээнэ!
- Motto in English: We will create world-class intellectual value!
- Type: Public university
- Established: 1959; 67 years ago
- Affiliations: CMUC
- President: Namnan Tumurpurev
- Academic staff: 1,050
- Undergraduates: 18.344 (Spring 2021)
- Postgraduates: 1743 (Spring 2021)
- Doctoral students: 214 (Spring 2021)
- Location: Ulaanbaatar, Mongolia
- Campus: Ulaanbaatar (main) Darkhan, Darkhan-Uul Erdenet, Orkhon
- Colors: Blue and yellow
- Nickname: ШУТИС (ShUTIS)
- Website: www.must.edu.mn

The Mongolian University of Science and Technology (MUST; Mongolian: Шинжлэх Ухаан, Технологийн Их Сургууль) was founded in 1959 as a part of the National University of Mongolia and started training the Industrial Economists and Construction Engineers. As a result of the formation of engineering and technical teaching staff, in 1969 the National University of Mongolia was affiliated the Polytechnic Institute with five schools such as: Civil Engineering, Power Engineering, Geology and Mining, Mechanical Engineering, and Engineering Economics had established with 13 departments. In 1982, by the decision of the Council of Ministers of the People's Republic of Mongolia (former name), the Polytechnic Institute was separated from the National University of Mongolia and reorganized into an independent university.

== Description ==
Consists of 11 affiliated schools, 1 graduate school, 1 college, affiliated high school and 4 research institutes and 46 research centres. Currently, over 20 thousand students enrolled in over 140 undergraduate and graduate degree programs, which contains 1040 faculty members, and over 3 staff and administration members.

The academic activities in the university abide by the list of academic fields made by the Ministry of Education, culture and science of Mongolia, and according to the training programs and curriculars designed for Doctoral Degree (Doctor of Philosophy – Ph.D.), Master's degree (Master of Arts – M.A., Master of Science – M.Sc., Master of Engineering –M.Eng., Master of Computer Science – M.CS., Master of Public Administration – M.PA, Master of Industrial Management – M.IM, Master of Information Technology –M.IT) and in Bachelor's degree (Bachelor of Arts – B.A., Bachelor of Science – B.Sc., Bachelor of Engineering – B.Eng., Bachelor of Computer Science – B.CS., Bachelor of Public Administration – B.PA, Bachelor of Business Administration – B.BA, Bachelor of Industrial Management – B.IM, Bachelor of Information Technology – B.IT).

The university organizes two forms of training for the undergraduate level as regular full-time training and in-service training. The university has academic links and exchange programs with more than 220 institutions from more than 21 countries in Europe, Asia and Pacific regions and North America. The university has become a member of number of international associations and organizations such as International Association of Universities (IAU), International Association for the Exchange Students for Teknikal Experience (IAESTE), Eurasia Pacific University Network (UNINET), ABET, ASIIN e.V, AVI, e.V etc.

== Affiliated Schools ==
- School of Civil Engineering and Architecture
- School of Business Administration and Humanities
- School of Geology and Mining Engineering
- School of Industrial Technology
- School of Information and Communication Technology
- School of Foreign Languages
- School of Applied Sciences
- School of Mechanical Engineering and Transportation
- School of Power Engineering
- School of Technology School in Darkhan
- Graduate School of Business

== Branches ==
- Darkhan
- Erdenet

== Memberships and Cooperation ==
It has cooperation agreements with more than 200 academic and research centers all over the world.

== Notable faculty ==
- Punsalmaagiin Ochirbat
- L.Dugerjav Sc
- Gerel Ochir, geologist
