= University of the Humanities =

University in Sükhbaatar, Ulaanbaatar, Mongolia

Coordinates: 47.9221°N 106.9191°E

- Хүмүүнлэгийн ухааны их сургууль
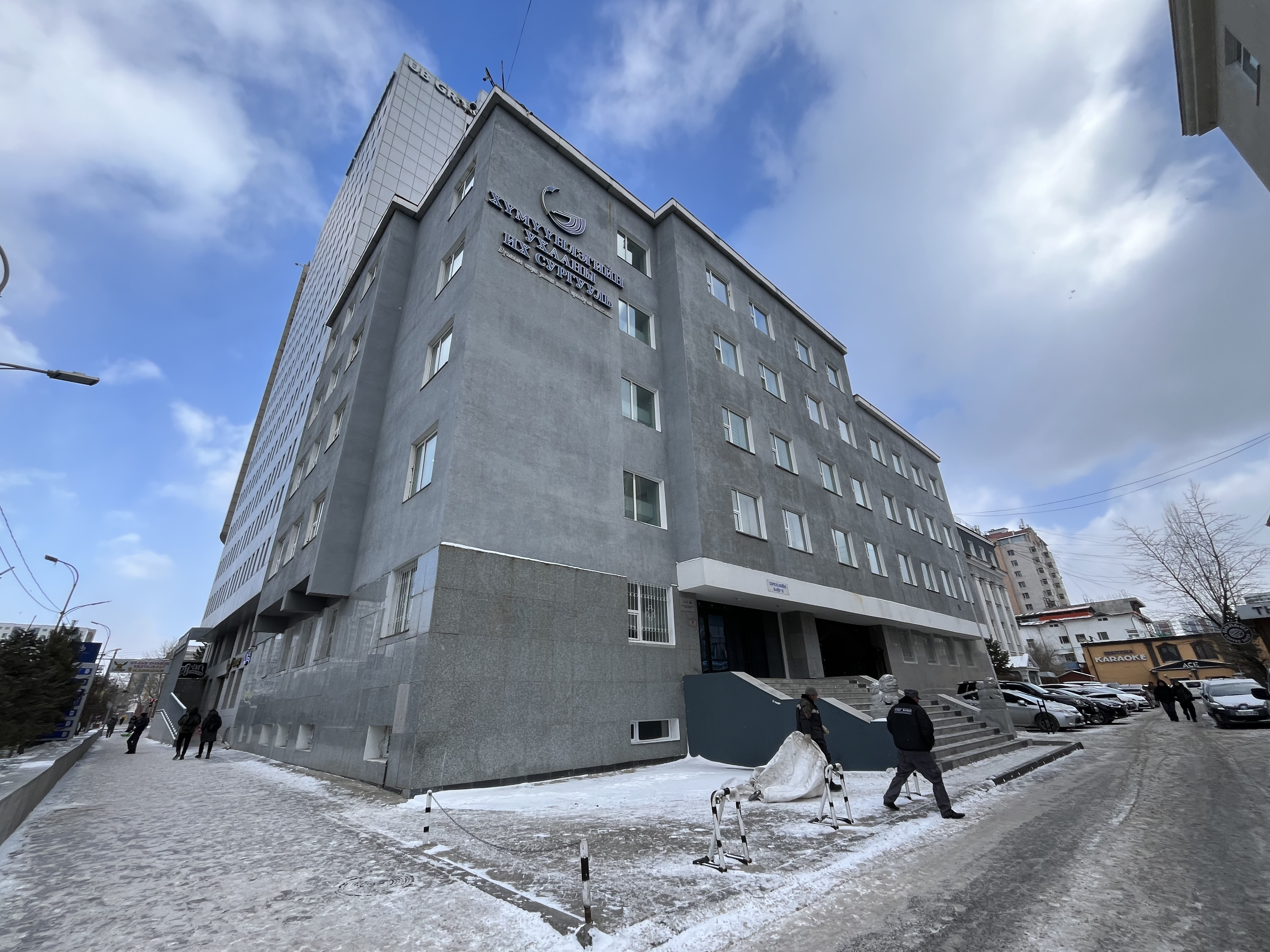
- Former name: Humanities University
- Established: 1992; 34 years ago
- Location: Sükhbaatar, Ulaanbaatar, Mongolia
- Website: https://humanities.mn/
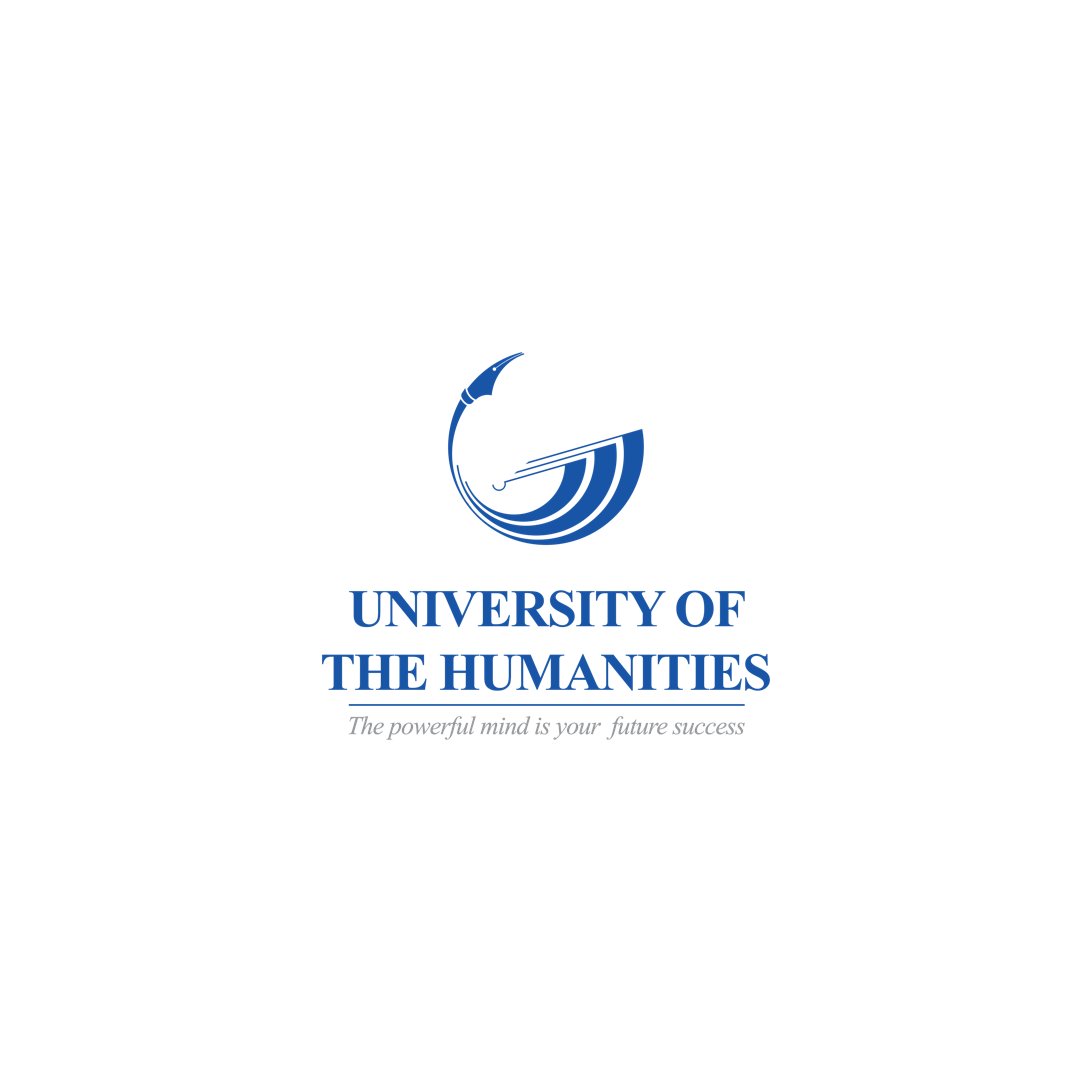

University of the Humanities (also known as Humanities University; Mongolian name: Хүмүүнлэгийн ухааны их сургууль) is a public university in Sükhbaatar District, Ulaanbaatar, Mongolia.

== History ==
The university was established in 1992 (34 years ago).

== Programs ==
The university offers undergraduate and graduate programs in fields including foreign languages, translation, education, journalism, computer science, and economics business.

== Accreditation ==
The university is accredited by the Mongolian National Council for Education Accreditation.

== Ranking ==
In 2014, it ranked fifteenth in Mongolia and 18367th in the world on the Webometrics Ranking of World Universities. It was ranked 7454th in the world in web rankings according to another source.
