= National University of Mongolia =

Public university in Mongolia

- Монгол Улсын Их Сургууль ᠮᠣᠩᠭᠣᠯ ᠣᠯᠣᠰ ‍ᠣᠨ ᠶᠡᠬᠡ ᠰᠣᠷᠭᠠᠭᠣᠯᠢ
- Motto: «Эрдмийн хэт цахиваас, хөгжлийн гал бадармой» (Erdmiin khet tsakhivaas, khögjliin gal badarmoi)
- Motto in English: The flame of progress flourishes from the forge of education
- Type: Public university
- Established: 5 October 1942; 84 years ago
- Affiliations: CMUC, UMAP
- Rector: Bayanjargalyn Ochirkhuyag (interim)
- Faculty: 797 (part-time 290, other 723)
- Undergraduates: 16,200
- Postgraduates: 3,625
- Doctoral students: 1,035
- Other students: 406 international students, 18 language preparatory students
- Location: Ulaanbaatar, Mongolia; 47.9231°N 106.9213°E
- Campus: Ulaanbaatar (main) Uliastai, Zavkhan Erdenet, Orkhon
- Colors: Blue
- Nickname: МУИС (MUIS)
- Website: www.num.edu.mn

The National University of Mongolia (NUM) (Note: Mongolian: Монгол Улсын Их Сургууль (МУИС), romanized: Mongol Ulsiin Ikh Surguuli (MUIS), Mongolian pronunciation: [mɔ́ɴɢɞɬ ʊɬsíɴ ix‿sʊrɢʊ́ɬʲ]) is a public university primarily located in Ulaanbaatar, Mongolia. Established in 1942, it is the oldest institution of higher education in Mongolia, and was originally named in honour of then-Prime Minister Khorloogiin Choibalsan as Choibalsan State University. It hosts 5 main faculties in Ulaanbaatar, two branches (in Uliastai, Zavkhan Province and Erdenet, Orkhon Province), and three academies of national importance (Mongol studies, economics, and sustainable development).

After the establishment of the Mongolian People's Republic and its first modern secondary school in 1921, it was deemed necessary to establish an academic institution at a higher level. In 1942, the government established the National University of Mongolia as Mongolia's first university, with the first students graduating in 1946. During socialism, the university served as a training center for the party elite. Education was paid for and strictly controlled by the state. After democratization, it gradually changed into a more modern university. In 1995, it started to offer bachelors, masters, and doctoral programs.

It holds a distinguished place in Mongolia's modern history, serving as both its first university as well as a parent to many of the country's premier universities. Many of the country's higher education institutions can trace their ancestry back to the National University of Mongolia's faculties and sub-institutes, including the University of Science and Technology, University of Life Sciences, University of Medical Sciences, and the University of the Humanities.

As of 2018, there were over 18,000 students enrolled in various programs, mostly taught in Mongolian.

== History ==
=== Founding ===
The origins of the National University of Mongolia date to the ruling party's 10th Congress, held from March to April 1940. According to the resolution passed on 5 April, there was a provision to "prepare for the establishment of an institution of higher learning", which would lay the groundwork for the NUM. As this resolution was one of the first that involved the participation of future leader Yumjaagiin Tsedenbal, a case has been made that the NUM's first proponent was the future leader.

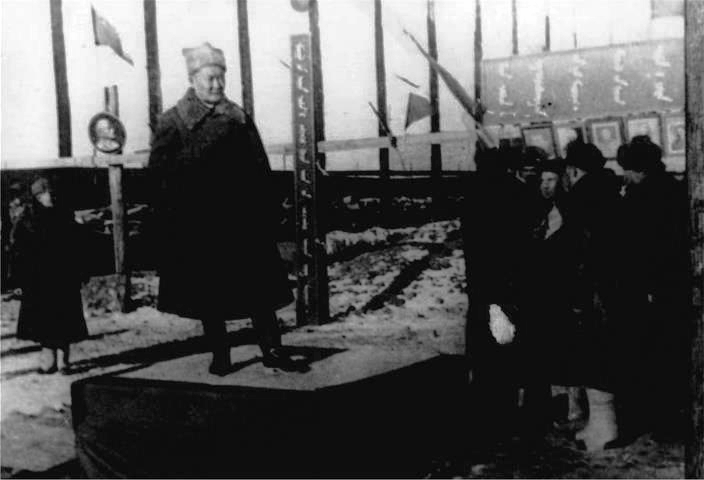
Founding of the National University of Mongolia, pictured is Khorloogiin Choibalsan

The university was established on October 5, 1942, as the first modern university in Mongolia. The faculties were initially Pedagogy, Medicine, and Veterinary Sciences. Part of its operation were supported by staff and materials provided by the Soviet Union, so much of the instruction was conducted in Russian.

93 students were selected for a preparatory course according to their knowledge of Russian, with 57 graduating from the course to enrol in the university. This initial course was mostly taught by teachers from the Soviet secondary school in Ulaanbaatar. In addition to these graduates, some teachers with Russian language skills were selected, with the first enrolment consisting of a total of 93 students. Among Mongolians, those with sufficient Russian language skills were mostly of the Buryat ethnic group, many of which were the children of those purged in the 1930s. 70-90 percent of these first students were Buryats, while a sizeable minority were USSR citizens.

=== Socialist period ===
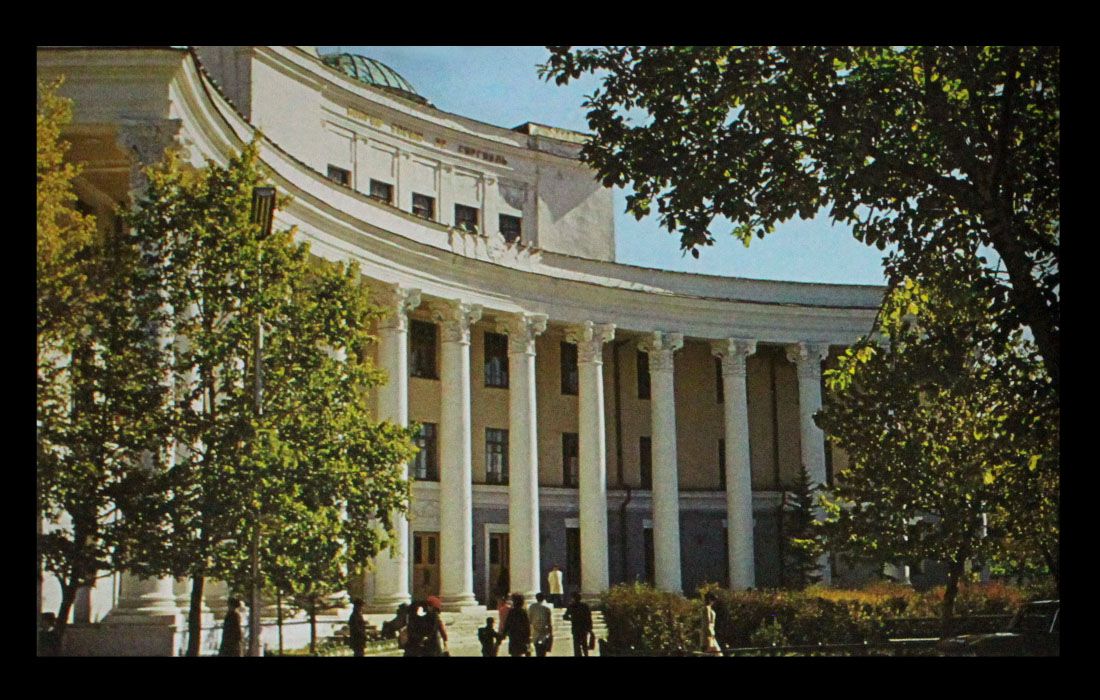
Main building in the 1970s

In 1943, the Faculty of Zootechnics was established at the National University of Mongolia.

The university held its first graduation ceremony in 1946, celebrating the achievements of 35 graduates.

Throughout the 1940s and 1950s, several faculties were formed to expand the academic offerings of the university. In 1947, the Faculty of Social Sciences was established, encompassing departments of history and economics. In 1949, the faculties of Veterinary Sciences and Zootechnics merged to create the Faculty of Agriculture. Additionally, the Faculties of Chemistry and Biology were established in 1951. That same year, the Faculty of Pedagogy became a separate Pedagogical Institute, now known as the Mongolian State University of Education. The university also introduced foreign language programs in 1956 and programs for performing arts in 1957.

As the university continued to grow, the Faculty of Agriculture became an independent institution called the Mongolian State University of Agriculture in 1958.

In the 1960s, the university expanded its academic disciplines further. Legal studies were introduced in 1960, followed by programs in Geology and Mechanical Engineering in 1961. The Faculty of Medicine also became a separate entity now known as the Mongolian National University of Medical Sciences in the same year.

The university added programs in Meteorology, Construction, and Energy Engineering in 1962. Additionally, the Nuclear Research Center was established in 1965, in collaboration with the Joint Institute for Nuclear Research in Dubna, USSR.

In 1969, the Polytechnical Institute was established as part of the National University of Mongolia, incorporating faculties of Civil Engineering, Power Engineering, Geology and Mining, Mechanical Engineering, and Engineering Economics. Eventually, this institute evolved into a separate institution in 1982, known as the Mongolian University of Science and Technology.

In 1979, the Russian language institute was founded at the university, and later in 1982, it became a separate institute, eventually transforming into the present-day University of the Humanities.

=== Modern era ===
The National University of Mongolia played a significant role in the Mongolian Revolution of 1990, serving as a gathering place for various secret groups advocating for democracy.

In 1994, 13 students were awarded master's degrees. Recognizing the importance of advanced studies, the Department of Postgraduate Affairs was established in 1997 to facilitate the growth of postgraduate programs.

In 1997, the Mathematical Institute was merged into the National University of Mongolia, enriching the university's academic offerings.

To ensure effective governance, a governing board was established in 1999, providing strategic direction and oversight for the university's operations.

In 2004, the Khovd branch of the National University of Mongolia became an independent institution known as Khovd University, allowing for more focused academic development in the region.

=== Restructurings ===
In 2010, Ulaanbaatar University and the Institute of Commerce and Business were merged into the National University of Mongolia, aiming to strengthen academic collaboration and interdisciplinary studies. However, both institutions later regained their independence, with Ulaanbaatar University becoming the Ulaanbaatar State University in 2015, and the Institute of Commerce and Business establishing itself as the University of Commerce and Business (Note: The original name in Mongolian is Худалдаа үйлдвэрлэл, which accurately translates to Commerce and Production) in 2017.

Starting from 2014, a comprehensive restructuring process was initiated at the National University of Mongolia. As a result, the university now operates with five main faculties, each specializing in distinct academic disciplines. These faculties are the Faculty of Business, the Faculty of International Relations and Public Administration, the Faculty of Law, the Faculty of Engineering and Applied Sciences, and the Faculty of Sciences.

== Administration ==
The National University of Mongolia is governed by an administrative structure that oversees its various faculties, branches, and affiliate institutions.

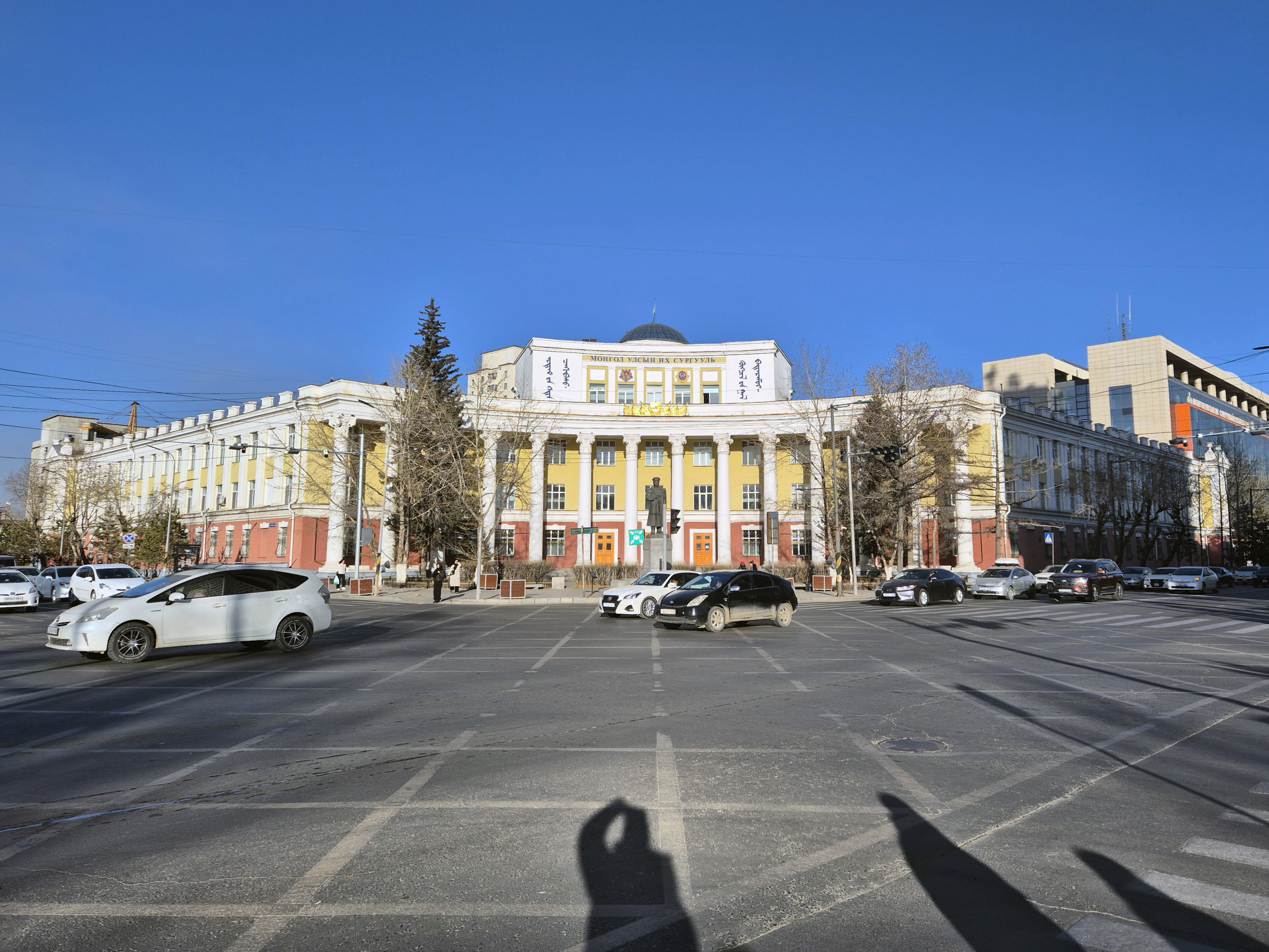
Main university building in Ulaanbaatar

=== Main faculties ===
- Business School
- School of Political Science, International Relations and Public Administration
- School of Law
- School of Technology and Engineering
- School of Information Technology and Electronics
- School of Arts and Sciences

=== Branches ===
- NUM-Orkhon School (based in Erdenet, Orkhon Province)
- NUM-Zavkhan School (based in Uliastai, Zavkhan Province)

=== Affiliate institutions ===
- Baigali-Ekh high school and Ecological Education Center - high school (lyceum) in Ulaanbaatar.

=== Rectors ===
Date	Name
1942-1944	Tünjiin Mashlai
1944-1953	Bazaryn Shirendev
1953-1957	Dondogiin Tsevegmid
1959-1967	Namsrain Sodnom
1967-1972	Dondogiin Tsevegmid
1972-1973	Jambyn Batmönkh
1982-1989	Osoryn Shagdarsüren
1989-1996	Daichaagiin Dorj
1996-2009	Tserensodnomyn Gantsog
2009-2010	Sürengiin Davaa
2013-2015	Artbazaryn Galtbayar
2015-2020	Yadmaagiin Tömörbaatar
2020–present	Bayanjargalyn Ochirkhuyag (interim)

== Academia ==
Admission to the National University of Mongolia (NUM) is primarily determined by the Mongolian General Entrance Examination scores. Prospective students are required to participate in this national examination, which assesses their knowledge and academic aptitude across various subjects.

== Ranking ==
The National University of Mongolia has achieved recognition for its academic contributions. According to the Tilburg University Economics Ranking, which assesses universities based on the Article Influence Score between 1990 and 2020, the university is ranked 831st globally and 120th in Asia.

== Notable people ==
=== Alumni ===
==== Politics ====
- Jambyn Batmönkh (economics) - last leader of the Mongolian People's Republic
- Radnaasümbereliin Gonchigdorj (mathematics) - Vice President of Mongolia and chairman of the State Great Khural
- Miyeegombyn Enkhbold (economics) - prime minister of Mongolia and chairman of the State Great Khural
- Norovyn Altankhuyag (physics & mathematics) - prime minister of Mongolia
- Danzangiin Lundeejantsan (law) - Chairman of the State Great Khural
- Zandaakhüügiin Enkhbold (law) - chairman of the State Great Khural
- Chimediin Saikhanbileg (law) - prime minister of Mongolia
- Ukhnaagiin Khürelsükh (law) - prime minister of Mongolia
- Togszhargalyn Gandi (journalism) - Mongolian People's Party member

=== Faculty ===
- Shagdarjavin Natsagdorj (historian, director of institute of history)
- Bazaryn Shirendev (historian, rector)
- Galsan Tschinag (writer)
- Tumen Dashtseveg (archaeology)
- Tsetsegjargal Tseden (archaeology)
- Altangerel Perle (paleontology)
- Tserenbaltavyn Sarantuyaa (law)

== Gallery ==
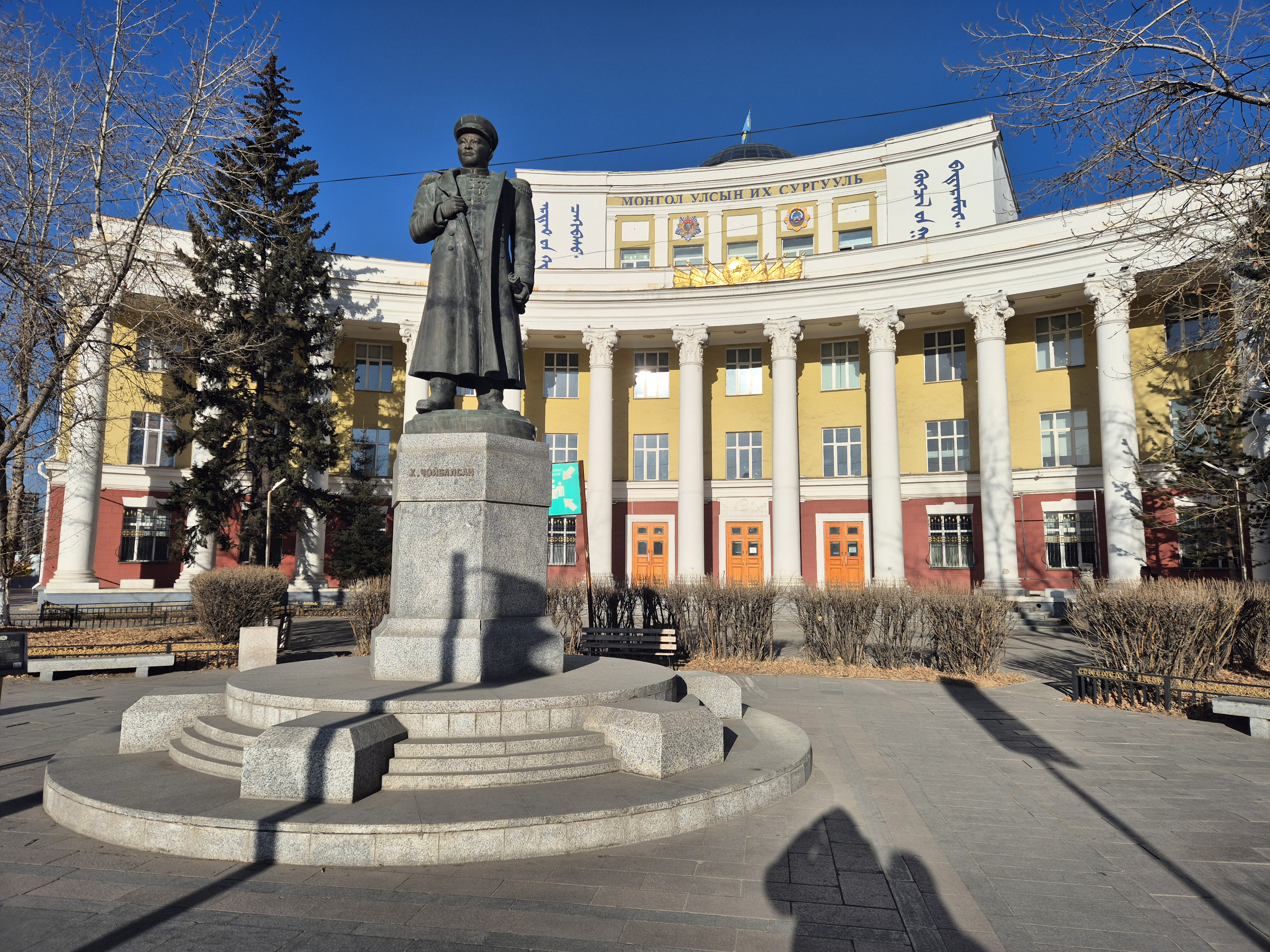
Main building, with statue of Khorloogiin Choibalsan

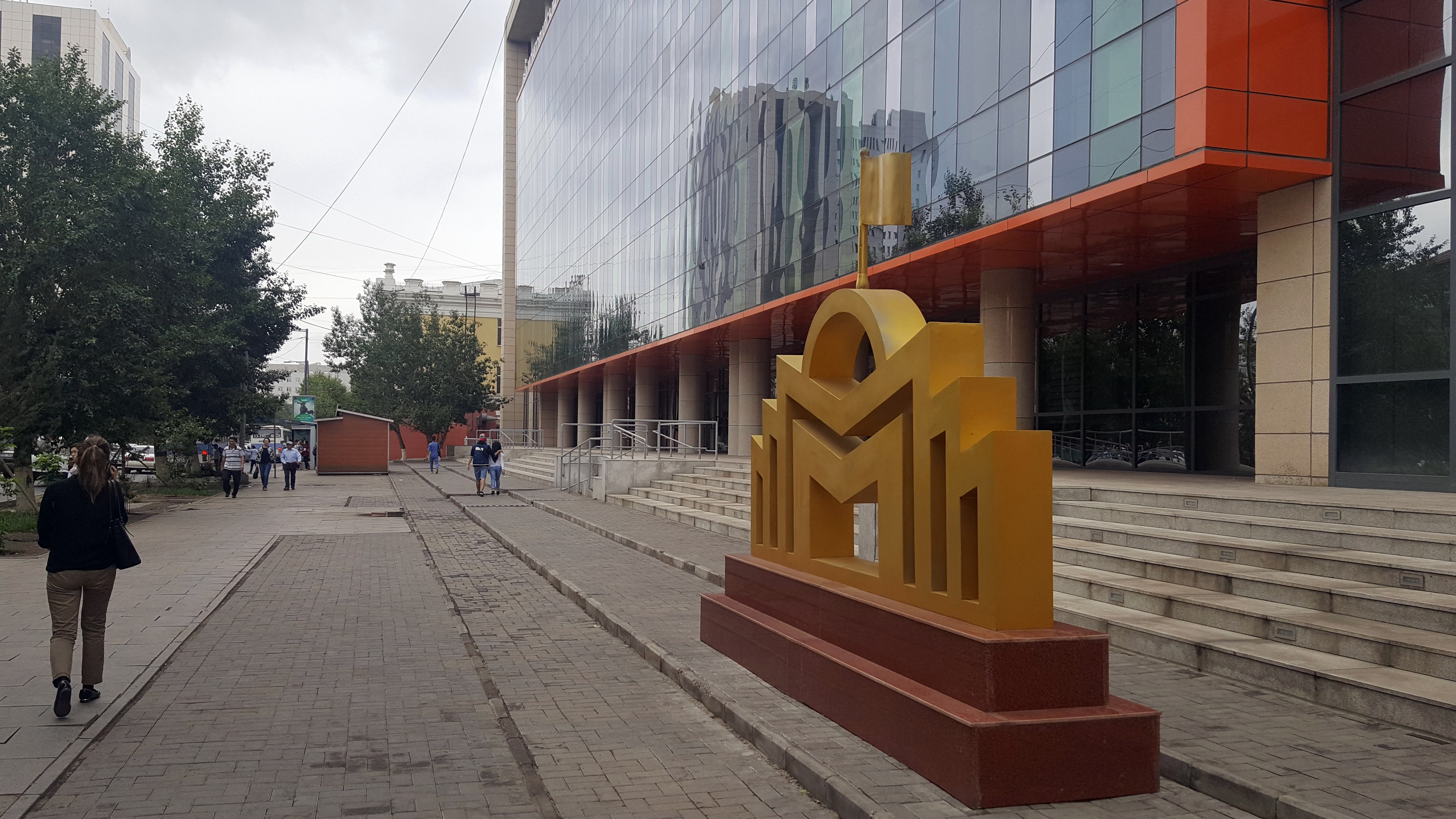
Library Building
