= Human trafficking in Mongolia =

In 2010 Mongolia was a source country, and to a much lesser extent, a destination for men, women, and children who were subjected to trafficking in persons, specifically forced prostitution and forced labor. Mongolian men, women, and children were found in these conditions in China, Macau, Malaysia, South Korea, and Hong Kong. Mongolian men and women were found in conditions of forced labor in Turkey, Kazakhstan, and the Czech Republic. Visa-free travel of Mongolians to Turkey resulted in a significant increase in the number of both labor and sex trafficking cases of Mongolian labor migrants in Turkey. There remained concerns about involuntary child labor in the Mongolian construction, mining, and industrial sectors, where children were vulnerable to injury and face severe health hazards. The problem of Mongolian women subjected to conditions of involuntary servitude after engaging in brokered marriages - mainly to South Korean men - continued. Trafficking within Mongolia often involved women and girls forced to work in saunas or massage parlors where they were subjected to forced prostitution. Anecdotal reports continued to indicate that South Korean and Japanese tourists engaged in child sex tourism in Mongolia.

During the year, the first ever documented case of Mongolia as a destination country involved two Filipina women who became victims of involuntary domestic servitude in the homes of wealthy Mongolian families after responding to online advertisements for work. Many victims originally sought employment through fraudulent newspaper or television advertisements, and traffickers continue to use technology like “TV Chat” to lure victims. Many victims are recruited by acquaintances, friends, and family, and victims often have their travel documents confiscated. Around 200 North Koreans are employed in Mongolia as contract laborers - a decrease from 250 in 2010, despite concerns that North Korean workers overseas do not appear to be free to leave their employment, have their freedom of movement and communication restricted, and receive an unknown fraction of the money paid to the North Korean government for their work.

The Government of Mongolia does not fully comply with the minimum standards for the elimination of trafficking; however, it is making significant efforts to do so. The government sustained partnerships with NGO's on anti-trafficking prevention measures. Nevertheless, the government did not demonstrate adequate efforts to proactively identify and protect victims of trafficking, leading to few victims coming forward to assist in the prosecution of their traffickers. The government's lack of adequate guidance on the use of the country's amended anti-trafficking article of law continues to cause courts to charge trafficking offenders under a lesser offense, resulting in shorter sentences. Corruption remains a key barrier to anti-trafficking progress.

The U.S. State Department's Office to Monitor and Combat Trafficking in Persons placed the country in "Tier 3" in 2021. In 2023 the country was placed at Tier 2.

In 2023, the Organised Crime Index noted that the country had limited support and health care for victims.

== Sex trafficking ==
Mongolian and foreign women and girls have been victims of sex trafficking in Mongolia. They have been raped and physically and psychologically harmed in brothels, homes, businesses, and other locations throughout the country, notably at the China-Mongolia border.

== Prosecution (2010) ==
The Mongolian government continued its efforts to enforce anti-trafficking laws during the reporting period. Mongolia prohibits all forms of human trafficking through Article 113 of Mongolia's Criminal Code, which was amended in 2007 and which prescribes penalties that are sufficiently stringent - up to 15 years' imprisonment - and commensurate with those penalties prescribed for other serious offenses, such as rape. In spite of significant legal and technical assistance from foreign donors, Mongolia's Supreme Court has interpreted the amended Article 113 in a way that has created ambiguities as to when prosecutors and judges should apply the law. This interpretation by the country's highest court, which notes that individuals who know they are being transported for sex work cannot be classified as trafficking victims under Article 113, is in violation of the 2000 UN TIP Protocol, which Mongolia has ratified. The Supreme Court's interpretation continues to confuse judicial officials, causing trafficking offenders to be prosecuted under the lesser offense of forced prostitution (Article 124). The government prosecuted 11 individuals in four trafficking cases under Article 113, and secured convictions of nine trafficking offenders, all of whom were sex trafficking offenders, compared with 11 convictions in the previous reporting period. The government has never prosecuted an offender of labor trafficking, and the Supreme Court's narrow interpretation of Article 113 serves as an impediment to the prosecution of labor trafficking cases in Mongolia. Those convicted under Article 113 received sentences of six to 15 years’ imprisonment. An additional five sex trafficking offenders were convicted under Article 124, two of whom were sentenced to one year's imprisonment; the remaining three have not yet been sentenced. In September 2009, due to the misclassification of a trafficking case that was prosecuted under Article 124 instead of Article 113, the government granted amnesty to a trafficker who was convicted of raping and forcing a girl into prostitution. As a result, the offender did not serve any time in prison. In October 2009, Mongolian courts ordered trafficking offenders to compensate five victims trafficked to Macau $3,000 each, in addition to significant imposed jail sentences; this decision is under appeal. According to Mongolian law, criminal cases are only initiated upon a victim's complaint, and victims are required to assist in the prosecution of their traffickers. This requirement, along with the lack of victim and witness protection mechanisms in Mongolia, causes many victims to refuse to report to police instances of trafficking out of fear of retribution from their traffickers, and restricts their ability to obtain restitution from courts. Corruption among law enforcement personnel remains a significant problem in Mongolia and a barrier to anti-trafficking progress, though the government has never investigated or taken disciplinary actions against law enforcement officers involved in trafficking-related corruption. In November 2009, police authorities of the border town Zamyn-Uud signed a memorandum of understanding with counterparts in the adjacent Chinese border town of Erlian covering cooperation against human trafficking.

== Protection (2010) ==
During the reporting period, the government referred 18 victims to an NGO shelter, run by the Mongolian Gender Equality Center. The NGO reported assisting these victims, and identifying and assisting an additional 61 victims not identified by the government, most of whom were referred from friends and family members of victims. The government did not demonstrate use of systematic procedures to proactively identify victims of trafficking among vulnerable groups, such as women detained for involvement in prostitution, or migrant laborers returning from abroad, and did not maintain statistics on the number of trafficking victims identified by authorities. The government did not provide specialized training to officials on victim identification. Victims were sometimes punished for unlawful acts committed as a direct result of their being trafficked, such as being prosecuted on prostitution charges. Officials did not refer trafficking victims to appropriate services. The government did not run any shelters for victims of trafficking, nor did it provide direct assistance to Mongolian trafficking victims repatriated from other countries or foreign victims of trafficking identified in Mongolia. The government provided $10,000 to the National Center Against Violence, which primarily sheltered domestic violence victims but also sometimes shelters trafficking victims. The government provided one NGO with $3,000 to counsel and assist children vulnerable to trafficking. Although the government encouraged victims to assist in the investigation and prosecution of trafficking offenders, Mongolian law continued to lack protection provisions for victims who served as prosecution witnesses, which put victims in great danger. The Mongolian government provided legal alternatives to the removal of foreign victims to countries where they may face retribution or hardship.

== Prevention (2010) ==
The Government of Mongolia continued modest trafficking prevention activities through partnerships with NGOs, international organizations, and foreign donors. Officials continued the distribution of NGO-sponsored passport and train ticket inserts on the dangers of trafficking and resources available for victims to some Mongolians traveling abroad. With NGO funding, the government cooperated on the production of public service announcements to raise public awareness about trafficking, and broadcast them on television channels. During the reporting period, Mongolia forged partnerships with Kazakhstan and the OSCE to host an international workshop on trafficking. The government did not take any measures during the reporting period to reduce the demand for commercial sex acts. Mongolian troops were briefed on the criminal nature of solicitation of prostitution, but did not receive training specific to human trafficking.

== Trafficking under Mongolian law ==
In 1996, amendments to the Criminal Code (1986) introduced the first provisions addressing trafficking-related offences in Mongolia. As a result, the first case of trafficking was successfully prosecuted, involving a Russian national trafficked two Mongolian girls, aged 18, and 19.

A revised criminal code including laws prohibiting trafficking came into effect in 2002, however articles remained vague and ill-defined. Under Article 113 (Sale and Purchase of Humans), the sale or purchase of human beings is punishable by a fine (51 to 250 times the minimum wage), obligatory labor for 300 to 500 hours, or by a prison sentence of up to 3 years.

1. Mongolia signed the Palermo Protocol in May 2008

2. In February 2008, Article 113 (Sale and Purchase of Humans) was revised;

3. In March 2008, the official Legal Interpretation of Article 113 (Sale and Purchase of Humans) of the Criminal Code of Mongolia was developed from the Supreme Court of Mongolia. This led to a significant improvement in the number of cases that resulted in prosecution.

== See also ==
- Human rights in Mongolia
- Humantrafficking.org entry on Mongolia
