= Women in Mongolia =

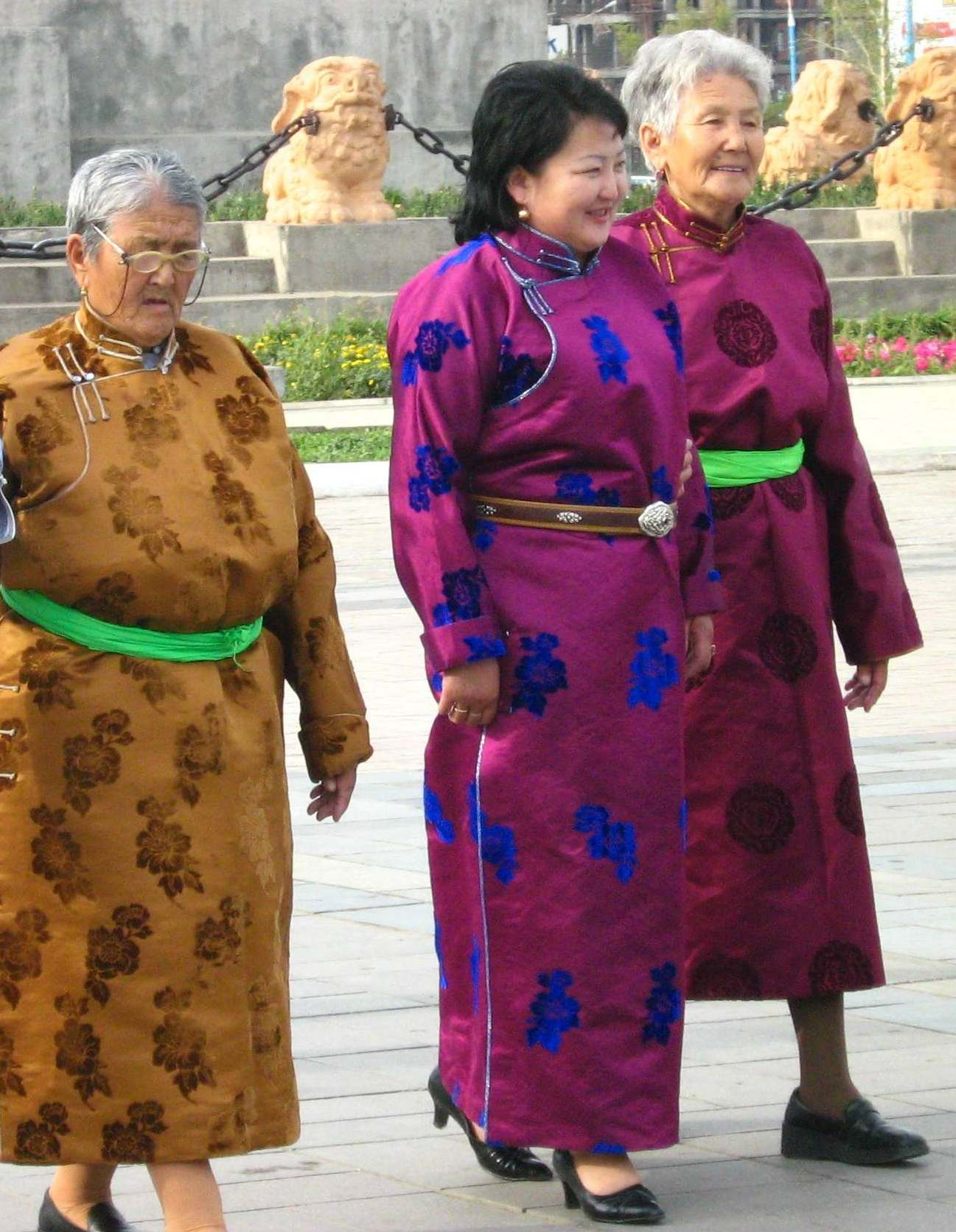
- Mongolian women

General statistics
- Maternal mortality (per 100,000): 45 (2017)
- Women in parliament: 25.4% (2024)
- Women over 25 with secondary education: 79.3% (2021)
- Women in labour force: 51.5% (2021)

Gender Inequality Index
- Value: 0.313 (2021)
- Rank: 76th out of 191

Global Gender Gap Index
- Value: 0.715 (2022)
- Rank: 70th out of 146

Mongolian women had a higher social status than women in many other East Asian societies, but were considered unable to herd cattle and possibly horses.

== Traditional status of Mongolian women ==
Mongolian women have historically enjoyed a somewhat higher status than women from other East Asian cultures. Women in Mongolia played vital roles in the family and economic life. Some more elite women had more opportunities than poor women, yet the demanding lifestyle required all women to work. Mongolian women were expected to manage do work in, and outside the home, including; caring for animals, manufacturing dairy products, shearing wool, and tanning hides. Through their household work, women in elite ranks of society were able to further their roles in order to gain substantial amounts of power. Those less fortunate were unable to benefit from their domestic work. When the Mongol empire collapsed, poor women in society were unable to get any sort of proper health care or any opportunity for education and leisure.

Nomadic women in Mongolia have typically been responsible for collecting buckets of water, cooking meals for the family, keeping livestock healthy, collecting wood for fires, nursing and raising children, making clothing, and generally keeping all domestic affairs in order.

History has proven that the perception of Mongolian women has revealed many contradictions. Many cultures that surround the Mongolian women are seen as subordinate to men; yet for Mongolian women today, they are dominated by noble womanhood. It is said that Mongolian women have traditionally had a higher degree of social positions and autonomy than women in Islamic societies, Medieval East Asian societies, South Asian, and Medieval European societies. For those women who were widowed or left because of husbands in the military, taking over their jobs was often a common practice. Although this took place in many Mongol societies, women were still considered subordinate to men. Women were also domestically restricted in what they were and were not allowed to take part in when their husbands were around. Firm actions of this subordination took place in daily activities such as women being only allowed to tend to sheep, yet men being responsible for horses- a lamb versus a stallion in generic historical terms.

== Mongolian People's Republic ==
Mongolian People's Republic is the period of Mongolian history which existed between 1924 and 1992 as a unitary sovereign socialist state in East Asia. It was ruled by the Mongolian People's Revolutionary Party and maintained close links with the Soviet Union throughout its history.

During this period, women in Mongolia obtained de jure equal rights. They had universal participation in all levels of education. In 1985, 63% of students in higher educational establishments were women along with 58% of the students in secondary schools. During the time frame, there were 51% women workers and 49% male.

Educated women began teaching and taking charge in the medicine department in 1979. These were both generally thought as the more female fields, and more than 60% of all doctors were female. Teaching was also predominantly a woman’s job with 67% of all teachers in general schools and 33% of teachers in higher educational schools. Despite having formal legal equality, as in other socialist states, women remained de facto subordinate to men. After democratisation in 1990, it was observed that women had become largely responsible for household management and childcare.

== Marriage ==
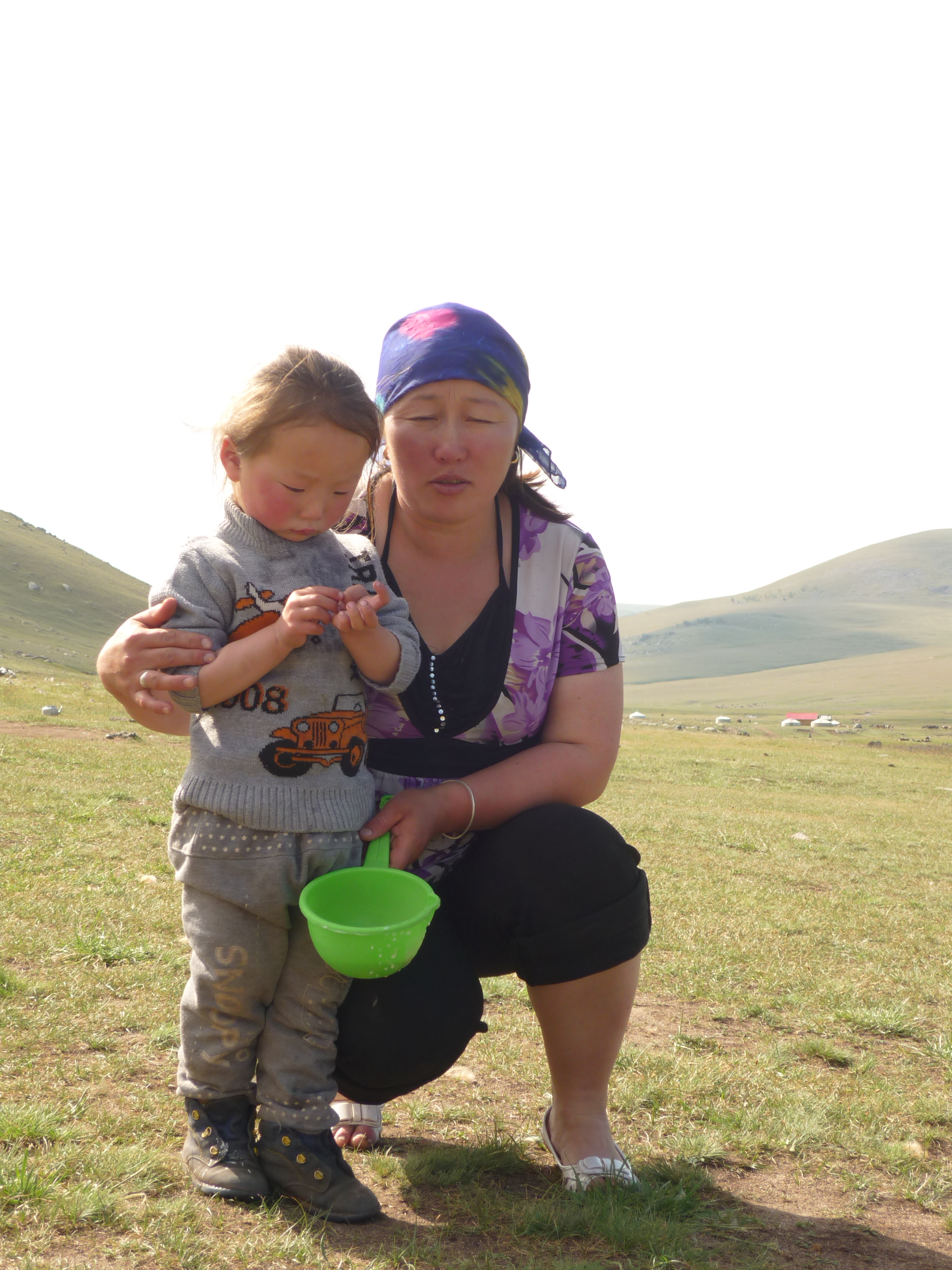
Mongolian woman with her child

Weddings in Mongolia are one of the most influential days of a man and woman's life together. Weddings are celebrated among extended family and friends. In the past, Mongolians were often engaged as young, around 13 to 14 years old. The bride and grooms' families make the first contact and propose a future partnership. In some historical accounts, the young groom would live with in-laws, in order to observe how the young bride and groom would get along with each. If, at this stage, the interaction between the two doesn't go well, the engagement can be broken off. When the future family proves to be a successful one, then the wedding would take place at the age of 18. In modern day, it is not common for earlier engagement. Mongolians normally don't have arranged marriages anymore. Monogamy is the only legal form of marriage. Dating is common, sex prior to marriage can be practiced. In herders family, a woman gets married, normally she is expected to go and live with the grooms' family or vice versa. Many marriages in Mongolia are organic and can be between friends or coworkers.

== Reproduction rights ==
Terms changed in 1921 when women were considered more of a value in economic growth for the population. A revolution began that year with determinations to bring women more into the public sphere. This was the first step in the effort of the state to promote population growth; a strong emphasis on women’s reproductive capacities.Women were pressured into having multiple children as part of their civic duties to the state.

== Politics ==
=== History of Women's Political Affiliation ===
The political alignment in Mongolia for women is the belief that women are discriminated against because they are women. Women also believe that they have little legitimacy when discussing political affairs with men. In the most traditional sense, in nomadic society, women were not allowed to partake in the formal political sphere as their decisions were limited to the household. The subordination from a man to a woman in Mongolia came to an end in 1921. This granted women citizen rights. The new constitution also gave equal rights to all citizens of Mongolia without focus of origin, sex, gender, or beliefs. In 1924, Mongolian women were able to vote and potentially be elected as President. The Women's Federation was also founded which was funded by the state itself allowing more women to become more active participants in the political system. Despite women's active participation in politics, there are few women at the top. Although many actions were taken, there is still much to be said for women in the political system and desire for the equality they would eventually like to have and deserve.

== Sex trafficking ==
Mongolian women and girls have been victims of sex trafficking in Mongolia. They have been raped and physically and psychologically harmed in brothels, homes, businesses, and other locations throughout the country, notably at the China–Mongolia border.

== See also ==
- Women in Asia
