= Bat-Erdeniin Zolboo =

Mongolian politician

- Бат-Эрдэнийн Золбоо
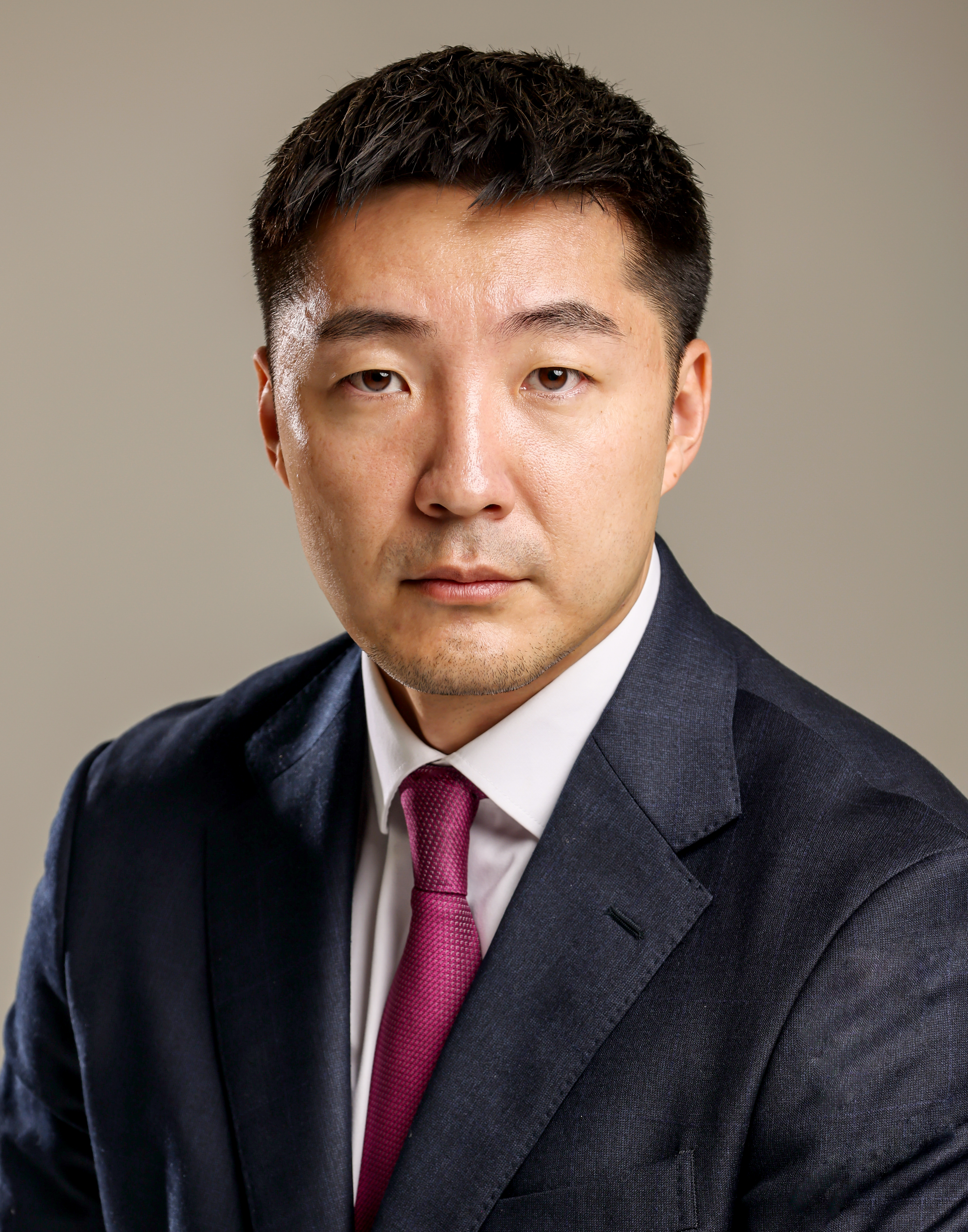

12th Chairman of Citizens' Representatives Khural of Songinokhairkan district
- Incumbent
- Assumed office 18 October 2024
- Preceded by: Dashdaraagiin Undarmaa
- Constituency: 17th, Songinokhairkhan District, Ulaanbaatar (2024-current); 13th, Songinokhairkhan District, Ulaanbaatar (2020-2024); 24th, Songinokhairkhan District, Ulaanbaatar (2016-2020)

Personal details
- Born: 18 October 1987 (age 39) Ulaanbaatar, Mongolian People's Republic
- Party: Mongolian People's Party
- Education: University of Finance and Economics; Mongolian National University School of Law

Bat-Erdeniin Zolboo (Mongolian: Бат-Эрдэнийн Золбоо, born 18 October 1987) is a Mongolian politician currently serving as the 12th Chairman of the Citizens' Representatives Khural (local governing council) of Songinokhairkhan district since October 2024. He was elected three times as a Representative of the Citizens' Representatives Khural of Songinokhairkan district.

As the Chairman, he oversees the sub-councils for Criminal Prevention and Disaster Risk Reduction within a district. Songinokhairkhan is the most densely populated district in Ulaanbaatar, the capital city of Mongolia, with over 360,000 residents, which constitutes 10% of Mongolia's total population and 30% of Ulaanbaatar city's population. The District Citizens' Representatives Khural is focused on land acquisition and housing projects aimed at reducing air and soil pollution under his leadership.

== Early life and education ==
Zolboo was born on 18 October 1987 in Ulaanbaatar, the capital of the Mongolian People's Republic and graduated the 23rd Secondary School in 2005.

He graduated University of Finance and Economics with a business administration Bachelor's degree in 2009, Mongolian National University's School of Law with a lawyer Bachelor's degree in 2020 and earned Master's degree in 2023.

== Political career ==
In 2016, He was elected as Representative of Citizens' Representatives Khural of Songinokhairkhan District, one of the 9 municipal districts of Ulaanbaatar. From 2016 to 2019, he served as the leader of the Citizens' Representatives Leaders' Khural in Songinokhairkhan District.

In the 2016, 2020, and 2024 local elections, he was elected as a representative of the Citizens’ Representatives Khural of Songinokhairkhan District.

During the 2020–2024 term, Zolboo actively worked to uphold the right of citizens—especially children—to study and grow in a healthy and safe environment. He led a citizen initiative to shut down several closely operating motels located near elementary schools in the Unur khoroolol (neighborhood in Songinokhairkhan district). These motels constantly sold alcohol and promoted prostitution, which eventually led to threats against nearby households and schoolchildren walking to and from school.

Zolboo requested a vote from the Citizens’ Representatives Khural, and as a result, a committee was established to shut down the motels and negotiate with their owners. These motels had been operating in the neighborhood for more than 20 years without proper authorization. Residents believed they were deeply connected to corruption and prostitution, and the area had become known as a street associated with Ulaanbaatar City’s red-light district.

After two years of sustained and active work, Zolboo’s committee achieved its goal, and the motels were finally shut down in June 2023.

In 2024 The Mongolian People's Party (MPP) won decisive victory in the local election, winning 43 seats out of 43 in the Citizens' Reprensetatives Khural of Songinokhairkhan district. On the first assembly of the Citizens' Reprensetatives Khural of Songinokhairkhan district Zolboo was nominated from MPP as a Chairman of the Khural. As a result he was elected as a Chairman with a 88.3% vote from assembly.
