= Prostitution in Tajikistan =

Prostitution in Tajikistan is legal, but related activities such as soliciting, procuring and brothel keeping are prohibited. Prostitution has increased within the country since the collapse of the Soviet Union. UNAIDS estimate there are 14,100 female sex workers in Tajikistan. Government official figures for 2015 were 1,777 prostitutes and 194 brothels. Prostitution occurs on the streets and in bars, restaurants, nightclubs and saunas, and HIV prevalence is 3.5% amongst sex workers.

Previously, as soliciting is an administrative offence, arrested prostitutes are given a nominal fine and released, while those procuring are prosecuted, potentially being punished by up to eight years in jail. In 2015, a new law was passed that doubled the fine for solicitation and added 15 days of home arrest to the punishment.

Being the poorest country to emerge from the Soviet Union, economic hardship is a primary reason women in the country enter prostitution.

Sex trafficking is a problem in the country.

== Sex tourism ==
Tajikistan is a sex tourism destination for Afghans. The more liberal regime in Tajikistan, the poverty of the country and a similar language make it attractive to Afghans, even if a Tajik visa may cost $500. Tajikistan has such a bad reputation in Afghanistan that men going to the country may tell their wives they are going to India.

== Sex trafficking ==
Tajikistan is a source and destination country for women and children subjected to sex trafficking. Women and children from Tajikistan are subjected to sex trafficking primarily in Turkey, UAE, and Russia, and also in Saudi Arabia, Kazakhstan, and Afghanistan, as well as within Tajikistan.

Women and minors are increasingly vulnerable to trafficking. In some cases, migrant laborers abandon their families, making women more vulnerable to trafficking as sole providers for their families. Some women who travelled to Syria or Iraq with promises of marriage were instead sold into sexual slavery. Tajik women and girls are transported to Afghanistan for the purpose of forced marriage, which can lead to sex trafficking. Tajik children are subjected to sex trafficking in Tajikistan and Afghanistan.

Article 130.1 of the 2003 criminal code, amended in 2004 and 2008, prohibits all forms of trafficking, including the use of force, fraud or coercion for the purpose of sexual exploitation and forced labour. The article prescribes penalties of five to 15 years imprisonment.

The United States Department of State Office to Monitor and Combat Trafficking in Persons ranks Tajikistan as a 'Tier 2 Watch List' country.

== 2014 crackdown ==
In June 2014, the Interior Minister, Ramazon Rahimov, expressed concerns about the growth of “immoral crimes,” and ordered a crackdown on prostitution. Brothels were to be raided and sex workers arrested and forcibly tested for HIV and other STIs. 505 sex workers were detained in the capital, Dushanbe, for the first few days, of these 450 had an STI according to a statement issued by the minister. 30 of the women were fined.

Sex workers reported that this led to rape, sexual humiliation and police officers demanding sex to release the sex workers from detention.

== See also ==
- Prostitution in the Soviet Union
