= Prostitution in Latvia =

Prostitution in Latvia is legal and regulated. The country is a destination for sex tourism.

Sex trafficking, child prostitution, and HIV are all problems in Latvia.

== Legal situation ==
Legally, the prostitution in Latvia is governed by the "Regulations Regarding Restriction of Prostitution" issued by the Cabinet of Ministers. A Restriction of Prostitution law to codify the Regulations is currently being developed.

Prostitutes must have reached age of majority, which is 18 in Latvia. A prostitute may not provide services while having herpes infection, dermatophytosis, pubic lice, gonococcal infection, chlamydia, scabies, leprosy or syphilis. A person who has HIV infection is banned from providing sexual services.

Although prostitution is regulated in Latvia, brothels and other forms of procuring are illegal. Persons are prohibited to join in groups in order to offer and provide sexual services for fee or to receive orders for sexual services. The managers of entertainment and recreational establishments must ensure that sexual services for fee are not offered, provided and received in their establishments.

According to the law "Any activity of the third person which promotes prostitution is prohibited" and "Persons are prohibited to join in groups in order to offer and provide sexual services..." The prostitutes may only operate in a residence rented or owned by them. However, they may not provide services if neighbours object. Furthermore, the residence may not be closer than one hundred meters from a school or a church. Any violation of restrictions on prostitution is punished by a fine in an amount up to 350–700 euros for a person and 700–1400 euros for a company.

Former Parliamentary Secretary of Ministry of the Interior Evika Siliņa explains that the complexity of issues and differences in opinion make the discussions complicated. The leader of Resource Centre for Women Marta Iluta Lāce says that it is the exploiters that should be brought to responsibility foremost.

=== History ===
Before 2015, it was a requirement for prostitutes to receive a health card from a venereologist and undergo a health check every month, and that they must be able to produce the health card on a client's request. The change was implemented due to a resolution by the European Parliament and the UN Convention that forbids registration of sexual workers.

On 28 July 2015, the Cabinet of Ministers set a goal to create a bill regarding the restrictions of prostitution until 1 January 2017. On 1 September, an inter-institutional work group was formed to work on the bill. On 7 February 2017, the government extended the deadline until September 1. The bill was delivered to Cabinet of Ministers on September 7 with many objections and its development was further extended to 1 June 2018. The changes were preliminarily expected to come in effect on 1 January 2020. One of the proposed directions was to establish prostitution as a profession with taxable income, however this proposal was declined. The law is expected to increase the age limit for both the worker and the client to 25 years.

== Sex tourism ==
The country is a destination for sex tourism. The capital, Riga, is a common destination for stag parties looking for a "good time".

=== Buy Bye Beauty ===
Buy Bye Beauty is a 2001 documentary film by Swedish director and performance artist Pål Hollender. The film is about the Latvian sex industry and its being fuelled by businessmen and sex tourists from Sweden visiting Riga. The film was shot in Riga in July 2000.

Latvian President Vaira Vīķe-Freiberga called it "political propaganda", Prime Minister Andris Bērziņš suggested that an international criminal case could be started against the film's makers.

Hollender claimed that police worked as part-time pimps and there was corruption in the police force generally. He also claimed there were 15,000 - 18,000 prostitutes in Riga. Official figures were, at the time, between 3,000 and 4,000 in the country with 80 percent in Riga.

== HIV ==
Latvia has one of the highest HIV prevalence rates in the European Union. Sex workers are one of the high risk groups. The EU's BORDERNET estimated a HIV prevalence of 22.2% amongst sex workers in 2016. In November 2024 Latvia's Disease Prevention and Control Center (SPKC) launched a public awareness campaign as the country had the highest rate of newly diagnosed HIV infections in the EU, double the average rate in EU countries.

== Sex trafficking ==
Latvia is a source country subjected to sex trafficking, including child trafficking. Latvian women and girls are subjected to sex trafficking in Latvia and other parts of Europe. Government agencies note an increase in child sex trafficking cases over the past few years. Latvian women recruited for brokered marriages in Western Europe, particularly Ireland, are vulnerable to sex trafficking.

In the 1999 Logos Centrs pedophilia case, a Riga modeling agency had 3,000 minors on its books (85% of them boys, many from orphanages) and was involved in child prostitution and violent pornography. Several people were convicted (including the Miss Latvia manager), but implicated politicians and businessmen were never prosecuted.

A research published in 2007 by Riga Christian Street Children Centre concluded that sexual exploitation of children was an urgent problem in Latvia and that teenager prostitution was one of the most widespread forms of exploitation.

Police report a growing number of children being recruited for sham marriages or commercial sex, from disadvantaged families, or those with mental health conditions. Children in state institutions, including orphanages, are particularly vulnerable to sex trafficking. According to an international organization study, approximately 20 percent of children are targeted online. Most street children in the country support themselves by prostitution.

Sections 154-1 and 154-2 of its criminal law prohibit all forms of trafficking and prescribe a maximum penalty of up to 15 years imprisonment. Trafficking crimes could be charged under section 164, which criminalises exploiting individuals' vulnerability or using deceit to involve them in prostitution—a scenario very similar to sex trafficking—but prescribes punishments as lenient as community service or a fine. A 20-officer state police unit specialises in investigating trafficking, sham marriages, and related crimes.

The government initiated prosecutions of 11 sex trafficking suspects under section 154–1 in 2016 (eight in 2015). Courts convicted four traffickers under section 154–1; all received conditional sentences resulting in no prison time. Courts concluded a 2011 case involving a police officer charged with facilitating pimping and taking bribes; he was sentenced to four years in prison. A case from 2014 involving two Riga police officers charged with facilitating pimping remained in pre-trial investigation at the end of the reporting period, according to a 2017 report by the U.S. State Department.

The United States Department of State Office to Monitor and Combat Trafficking in Persons ranks Latvia as a 'Tier 2' country.

== See also ==
- Prostitution in the Soviet Union
