= Logos Centrs pedophilia case =

1999 Latvian scandal

The Logos Centrs pedophilia case (Latvian: "Logos centra" pedofilijas lieta) was a criminal scandal and child sexual abuse case that surfaced in Latvia in 1999. Centered on the Riga-based video model agency Logos Centrs, the investigation revealed a network involved in the sexual exploitation of minors, the production of violent pornography, and child prostitution. The case led to the convictions of several individuals, including the manager of the "Miss Latvia" pageant, and implicated high-ranking politicians and businessmen, none of whom were ultimately prosecuted. The scandal drew comparisons to the American financier Jeffrey Epstein, with Latvian media and public figures referring to the case as a Baltic "Epstein" affair.

== Background ==
The video model agency "Logos Centrs" was headed by director Jurijs Jurjevs who was also a psychiatrist. The agency was directly involved in the production of violent pornography and operated an escort service that functioned as a front for underage prostitution. Investigators later determined that a total of 67 individuals had been sexually exploited, of whom 61 were minors, with the youngest victim being 13 years old. The agency had catalogued 3,000 minors – 85% of them boys, many sourced from orphanages – for potential placement as models, escorts, or in pornography.

The scandal broke on 19 September 1999, when the Latvian Independent Television (LNT) program Nedēļa (The Week) aired a report alleging the involvement of several ministers and public figures in pedophilia. The broadcast prompted the Saeima to establish a parliamentary investigative commission headed by opposition MP Jānis Ādamsons.

== Investigation and arrests ==
The Prosecutor General's Office launched a criminal investigation. The first person detained was Jurijs Jurjevs in mid-August 1999. Other individuals detained and charged in the case included:

- Ainārs Eisaks, the former manager of the "Miss Latvia" pageant project, who was arrested on 27 December 1999. In 2019 it was revealed that he was a former employee of the KGB.
- Jurijs Jurjevs, director of Logos Centrs, who was sentenced to over four years in prison. In 2000 it was revealed that was a former employee of the KGB.
- Jurijs Kutirevs, an employee of the agency.
- Deniss Hohlovs, an employee of the agency.
- Andris Meinarts, a former employee of the Citizenship and Migration Affairs Office, who was charged as a consumer of sexual services from minors.
- Ingus Tūns, an employee of the firm "Izimeks". In 2019 it was revealed that he was a former employee of the KGB.
- Anatolijs Rudenko, a model for Logos Centrs.
- Vilnis Vorslavs, an employee of the newspaper Diena, who was identified as an adult "actor" in pedophile pornography.

By March 2000, a seventh person had been detained in connection with the case.

In April 2000, Latvian authorities issued a warrant to search the premises of three internet companies in the United States that were hosting the Logos Centrs website, which was being used to offer models for pornographic films and prostitution, including underage girls.

== Convictions and sentences ==
Several key figures in the case were convicted and received prison sentences:

- Ainārs Eisaks: On 24 August 2000, the prosecutor requested a seven-year sentence, but Eisaks was sentenced to 2.5 years in prison for sexually abusing minors.
- Andris Meinarts: Found guilty on all 21 counts against him and sentenced to 10 years in prison.
- Jurijs Jurjevs: Sentenced to more than four years in prison for his role as the head of Logos Centrs. He died in September 2014.
- Ingus Tūns: The charges against Tūns were later separated from the main Logos Centrs case into a distinct criminal proceeding which further resulted in 5 years in prison.

== Political fallout and Ādamsons accusations ==
Jānis Ādamsons, the head of the parliamentary commission, publicly alleged that prominent individuals had been involved in the pedophilia scandal, including Andris Šķēle, the sitting Prime Minister; Valdis Birkavs, the Minister of Justice; Mareks Segliņš, the Minister of the Interior; Andrejs Sončiks, the Director-General of the State Revenue Service; Jānis Skrastiņš, the Attorney General.

According to Ādamsons, a total of 65–70 surnames were mentioned in connection with the scandal. Despite these accusations, none of the political figures were ever charged with a crime. Instead, Ādamsons himself faced legal action and was prosecuted and found guilty of abuse of office for knowingly disseminating false and defamatory information about the high-ranking officials. He was ordered to pay a fine of 10,400 lats (approximately $15,000 USD at the time).

== Aftermath ==
After serving his sentence, Ainārs Eisaks reportedly moved to Moscow and later worked in the restaurant business in Latvia. Jurijs Jurjevs died in September 2014. Ingus Tūns moved to Pattaya, Thailand after serving his sentence.

== See also ==
- Jeffrey Epstein
