= Prostitution in Belarus =

Prostitution in Belarus is illegal but commonplace and is an administrative, rather than criminal, offence. Running a brothel is forbidden and engaging in other means of pimping are punishable by up to 10 years in prison. UNAIDS estimated there were 22,000 sex workers in Belarus in 2016, around 23 sex workers per 10,000 people.

Sex trafficking is a problem in the country.

== Historical extent ==
Official data for Vitebsk, Minsk, Grodno and Mogilev provinces in 1889 showed there were 50 brothels with 326 prostitutes working in them. The 1897 Russian census of the 5 Belarus provinces recorded 479 prostitutes.

According to Ministry of Internal Affairs official 2010 figures, there were 1,930 women involved in prostitution in Belarus, roughly 637 of them were in Minsk. 780 people were prosecuted for prostitution in 210.

== Sex tourism ==
The country is a destination for sex tourism. The government has tried to combat this by visa restrictions. However, there are no visas required for visitors from Russia, where most of the sex tourists come from. Most tourists travel to the country independently, but there are "sex tours" organised from Turkey and Western Europe.

Russian are attracted to casinos in the country, (Russia banned gambling and shut all casinos in 2009) and prostitution is attached to many of the casinos. There have been a number of high-profile arrests in connection with prostitution in casinos. In 2012, the art director and manager of Minsk's Dankoff Club were arrested and later the owner of the club, Jury Dańkoŭ, was also arrested.

In 2009, a Turkish citizen resident in Belarus was jailed 7 years for organising sex tours from Turkey. A year later an accomplice was also sentenced to 7 years. Some Middle East nationals have also been deported from Belarus for similar activities.

== Sex trafficking ==
Belarus is a source, transit, and destination country for women and children subjected to sex trafficking. Belarusian victims are primarily subjected to trafficking in Russia and Belarus, as well as in Poland, Turkey, and other countries in Eurasia and the Middle East. Some Belarusian women travelling for foreign employment in the adult entertainment and hotel industries are subjected to sex trafficking. The government has identified Belarusian, Moldovan, Russian, Ukrainian, and Vietnamese victims exploited in Belarus.

Article 181 of the criminal code prohibits both sex and labour trafficking and prescribes penalties ranging from five to 15 years imprisonment in addition to the forfeiture of offenders’ assets. The government reported one sex trafficking investigation in 2016 under article 181, compared with one in 2015, one in 2014, and six in 2013.

The United States Department of State Office to Monitor and Combat Trafficking in Persons ranks Belarus as a 'Tier 3' country.

== See also ==
- Human trafficking in Belarus
- Prostitution in Russia
- Prostitution in the Soviet Union
- Prostitution in Ukraine
