= Prostitution in Kyrgyzstan =

Prostitution in Kyrgyzstan has been legal since 1998, but the operation of brothels, pimping, and recruiting persons into prostitution are illegal, with penalties of up to five years There are estimated to be 7,100 sex workers in the country. Prostitution occurs on the streets, in bars, hotels and brothels.

Prostitution has been blamed for a rise in AIDS. The HIV prevalence amongst sex workers is 2%.

Sex trafficking is a problem in the country.

== Law enforcement ==
NGOs and sex workers report harassment and corruption by law enforcement and forced health checks. Since the setting up of the Police's "Department for Combating Human Trafficking and Crimes Against Public Morality" in 2013, the situation has deteriorated. In the capital, Bishkek, the former red-light district of Pravda Street is now devoid of prostitutes. A few "mamochki" (madams) are on the street, the sex workers being in nearby hotels.

Kyrgyz police officers allegedly exploit female trafficking victims, including some younger than age 18, for sex both in saunas and on the street. Concerns persist about police misconduct and corruption, including allegations that police threaten and extort sex trafficking victims, including minors, and reports that police accept bribes from alleged traffickers to drop cases.

== Tais Plus ==
The NGO Таис Плюс (Tais Plus) is an organisation that advocates sex workers' rights and provides support and education to sex workers.

The organisation was started in 1997 by a group of sex workers as a "trade union". In 2000 it was registered as an NGO and received the status of a public organisation.

Tais Plus were successful in opposing an amendment to the law in 2005 that would have criminalised sex work, and again in 2012 against a proposed amendment to make prostitution an administrative offence.

It has been estimated that about 90% of street sex workers in Kyrgyzstan have reached by the organisation's outreach project.

== Sex trafficking ==
Kyrgyzstan is a source, transit, and destination country for women and children subjected to sex trafficking. Women and girls are subjected to sex trafficking abroad, reportedly in Turkey, the United Arab Emirates (UAE), India, Russia, Kazakhstan, South Korea, and within the country. Underage teenage girls from Uzbekistan increasingly are subjected to sex trafficking in the southern region of the Kyrgyzstan. Some men and women from Uzbekistan, Tajikistan, and Turkmenistan transit the country as they migrate to Russia, the UAE, and Turkey, where they may be subjected to sex trafficking.

Article 124 of the criminal code, entitled "Trafficking in Persons", criminalises both sex and labour trafficking of adults and children. The article requires the prosecutor to prove the offender used force, blackmail, fraud, deception, or abduction for cases of sex trafficking regardless of whether the victim is a child or adult. The government initiated five sex trafficking investigations under article 124 in 2016.

The United States Department of State Office to Monitor and Combat Trafficking in Persons ranks Kyrgyzstan as a 'Tier 2' country.

== See also ==
- Prostitution in the Soviet Union
