= Sex trafficking in Mongolia =

Mongolian and foreign victims are sex trafficked into and out of the provinces of Mongolia. They are raped and physically and psychologically harmed in brothels, hotels, businesses, homes, and other locations within these administrative divisions.

Sex trafficking in Mongolia is human trafficking for the purpose of sexual exploitation and slavery that occurs in the country. Mongolia is a source, transit and destination country for sexually trafficked persons.

Mongolian citizens, primarily women and girls, have been sex trafficked within Mongolia and to other countries in Asia and different continents. Foreign victims are sex trafficked into the country. Children and persons in poverty are particularly vulnerable to sex trafficking. Victims are deceived, threatened, and or forced into prostitution and their passports and other documents are often taken. Beatings and druggings are common. They suffer from physical and psychological abuse and are typically locked up or guarded. Victims tend to live in poor conditions and are forced to do unfree labour. A number contract sexually transmitted diseases from rapes without condoms. Victims are often traumatized and some commit suicide.

Male and female traffickers are often members of or facilitated by crime organizations and gangs. Mongolian traffickers have operated outside of the country in China, Macau, South Korea, and elsewhere. Family members and friends are sometimes the perpetrators.

The extent of sex trafficking in Mongolia is difficult to know because of the lack of data, underground nature of sex trafficking crimes, and other factors. The rapid growth of mining and other industries in twenty-first century Mongolia has led to an increase in sex trafficking in the country. Sex trafficked victims have been sent to businesses supporting transportation links, including coal routes, with China. The government of Mongolia has been criticized for not providing enough assistance to victims.

== Korea–Sex Trafficking ==
In the Korean history of women's enforced sexual labor, Imperial Japan was not the first foreign nation to take advantage of its superior political power position in the exploitation of Korean women's sexual labor. After the defeat of the Goryeo Dynasty (918–1392) by the Mongols over 700 Years ago, half a million women and children were taken by the Mongolian Army. The Korean State was then forced to round up young females and send them as kongnyo (literally, "tribute women") to the Mongols of the Yuan dynasty (1271–1368) for over eighty years. The tribute women were the Mongols' version of comfort women

== China–Mongolia border ==
Mongolian and Chinese women and girls are sex trafficked to and through the China–Mongolia border. At the border and in the Gobi Desert are global mining sector and other heavy industry operations with large workforces of isolated men. These sites, including the ones in Tavan Tolgoi coal deposits, have been a focal point for prostitution and sex trafficking.

== Non-governmental organizations ==
The Human Security Policy Studies Centre, headquartered in Ulaanbaatar, fights against sex trafficking in Mongolia.

Talita Mongolia conducts anti-sex trafficking efforts in Mongolia.

The Mongolian Gender Equality Center provides rehabilitative assistance to sex trafficked victims.

Lantuun Dohio NGO fights against human trafficking and child abuse.
