= Prostitution in Russia =

Prostitution is illegal in Russia. The punishment for engagement in prostitution is a fine from 1500 up to 2000 rubles. Moreover, organizing prostitution is punishable by a prison term. Prostitution remains a very serious social issue in Russia. In 2006, there were 719,822 sex workers nationwide, around 50 sex workers per 10,000 people. According to different estimates, there were between one and three million prostitutes in the country in the 2010s.

== Historical overview ==
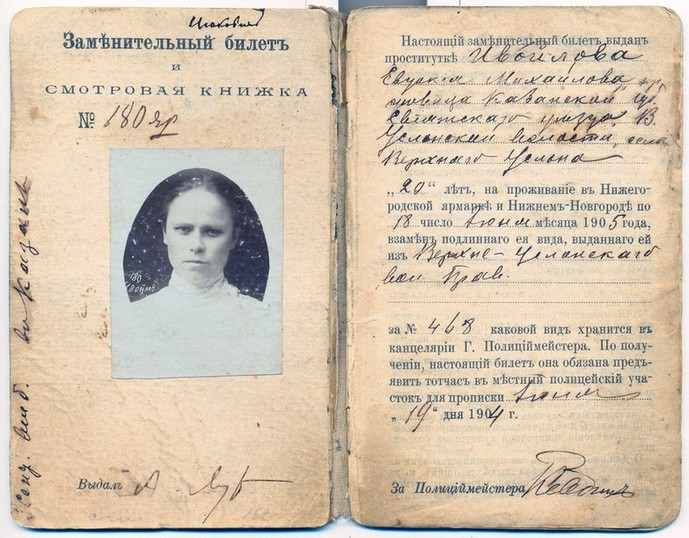
Yellow tickets were special ID cards issued to prostitutes

Prostitution in Russia became common after Peter the Great's military reforms that created a sizable class of unmarried men who were serving in the military. These soldiers started generating a demand for prostitution. Monarchs who followed Peter I had different approaches to prostitution, ranging from complete abolition to decriminalization.

From 6 October 1843, prostitution was legal in the Russian Empire in the form of a regulation system, and prostitutes were issued a special "yellow ticket" ID cards. Numerous brothels existed in most cities, ranging greatly in class and price. Customers included diverse groups ranging from the aristocracy to the working class. Legally, only women were allowed to own brothels. But illegal street prostitution was still dominated by male pimps. The term kot (Russian: кот, tomcat) was used for a male pimp, while a female brothel keeper is referred to as a bandersha (Russian: бандерша).

Following the opening of Japan, Vladivostok would become the focus of settlement for Japanese emigrating to Russia. A branch of the Japanese Imperial Commercial Agency (日本貿易事務官, Nihon bōeki Jimukan) was opened there in 1876. Their numbers grew to 80 people in 1877 and 392 in 1890; women outnumbered men by a factor of 3:2, and many worked as prostitutes (Karayuki-san). However, their community remained small compared to the more numerous Chinese and Korean communities; an 1897 Russian government survey showed 42,823 Chinese, 26,100 Koreans, but only 2,291 Japanese in the whole of the Primorye area. A large portion of the migration came from villages in northern Kyūshū.

In the Russian Far East, east of Lake Baikal, Japanese prostitutes and merchants made up the majority of the Japanese community in the region after the 1860s. Japanese nationalist groups like the Black Ocean Society (Genyōsha) and Amur River Society-(Kokuryūkai), glorified and applauded the 'Amazon army' of Japanese prostitutes in the Russian Far East and Manchuria and enrolled them as members. Certain missions and intelligence gathering were performed around Vladivostok and Irkutsk by Japanese prostitutes.

Before 1917 there were said to be between 25,000 and 30,000 prostitutes in Moscow. Prophylactoriums, medical treatment centres, were established in 1925 to treat alcoholics and prostitutes. By 1929 there were five in Moscow. The prophylactorium board in Moscow estimated that there were 3000 prostitutes in Moscow in 1928. Handicraft cooperatives were established to provide alternative employment for them. According to secret research carried out in the late 1920s, almost 60% of urban Soviet men were using the services of prostitutes. There was also a separate category of prostitutes, the ‘intergirls’ who worked in hotels for foreign tourists and accepted payment only in foreign currencies. Women who worked in ordinary hotels and at stations often had protection from the local police, but those in the luxury hotels were under the wing of the KGB.

Prostitution has been illegal in Russia since the establishment of the Soviet Union. However, during the post-Soviet years, this industry experienced significant growth.

In 2017, according to Bloomberg News, Russian president Vladimir Putin, discussing Donald Trump, told to reporters: "I find it hard to believe that he [Trump] rushed to some hotel to meet girls of loose morals, although ours [Russian] are undoubtedly the best in the world". Zack Beaucamp of Vox commented that with this utterance Putin pursued two goals: to irritate the Westerners and to connect with his Russian supporters.

== Tochka ==
Tochka (Russian: то́чка, romanized: tóčka, IPA: [ˈtot͡ɕkə]) is an euphemism for an outdoor location where prostitutes in Moscow, other large Russian cities, and by major intercity highways can typically be found. The word точка can be literally translated as a 'point' or 'location' of sale where services can be bought.

== Moscow city government actions ==
Starting from the late 1990s, the Moscow city government made many noticeable attempts to eliminate prostitution in Russia and there is serious jail time for prostitution to eliminate these markets, other than to eliminate some of the more obvious points along Tverskaya, Moscow's main avenue. Prostitutes are controlled by organized criminal gangs that bribe local police departments to remain in business. Instead, the city police randomly checked the documents of women traveling alone after dark. For this reason, prostitutes often carried a hundred rubles with which to bribe the police.

== Child prostitution, foreign prostitutes, and the trafficking of women ==
Russia is a major source of women trafficked globally for the purpose of sexual exploitation. Russia is also a significant destination and transit country for persons trafficked for sexual and labor exploitation from regional and neighboring countries into Russia, and on to Europe, Asia and North America. In Tel Aviv the number of brothels skyrocketed from 30 to 150 between 1996 and 2001—largely because of an influx of Russian prostitutes into Israel.

The International Labor Organization estimates that 20 percent of the five million illegal immigrants in Russia are victims of forced labor, which is a form of trafficking. There were reports of trafficking of children and of child sex tourism in Russia. The Russian government has made some effort to combat trafficking but has also been criticized for not complying with the minimum standards for eliminating it. The United States Department of State Office to Monitor and Combat Trafficking in Persons ranks Russia as a 'Tier 3' country.

A large case of forced prostitution and mass murder was uncovered in 2007 near the industrial town of Nizhny Tagil. A gang of pimps had abducted girls and forced them to work as prostitutes in their brothel, killing the ones who refused. A mass grave with up to 30 victims was found. (See: Nizhny Tagil mass murder (2002–2007).)

Three prostitutes from China were arrested in Moscow in January 2009. In 2011, a brothel in Moscow with Chinese and Vietnamese prostitutes which served only Chinese citizens as clients was uncovered, it advertised to its Chinese clients via coded messages in a Chinese language newspaper but was uncovered by the police.

Human smugglers coerced Vietnamese women to work in brothels in Moscow. Mostly other Vietnamese people patronize them. In one incident the smugglers seized the Vietnamese women's travel papers and tricked them by telling them that a textile factory was going to hire them. The manager of the Vietnamese brothel may have been on friendly terms with Vietnamese Embassy staff since the managers caught a brothel runaway after Vietnamese Embassy was contacted by her. The Russian police could not manage to stop the prostitution because one of the managers of the Vietnamese brothel was a family member of the Vietnamese embassy staff employee. The number of involuntary Vietnamese prostitutes numbers in the thousands. Russia-based brothels are destinations via China for Vietnamese girls who were forced into the sex trade by human smugglers.

A Vietnamese American woman, Hui Danh, sought help to extract from the Moscow Brothel her younger sister Huynh Thi Be-Huong. The effort by Hui Danh was successful in having the brothel release those specific 15 Vietnamese women. A teenager who was only aged 16 was among the 15 forced prostitutes.

The Vietnamese woman who ran the brothel was Thuy An and she was family to the Vietnamese embassy employee Nguyen Dong Trieu. The forced prostitutes were hit by their female manager Thuy An.

Three Vietnamese women returned to the city of Ho Chi Minh after they were tricked into going to Russia for prostitution by another woman.

Vietnamese women were tricked into prostitution in Russia by a Vietnamese woman named Le Thi Tham.

== In popular culture ==
- The Yellow Passport – a 1916 U.S. feature movie
- The Yellow Ticket – a 1931 U.S. feature movie
- Intergirl – a 1989 dramatic film

== See also ==
- Human trafficking in Russia
- Prostitution in Belarus
- Prostitution in the Soviet Union
- Prostitution in Ukraine
