= Prostitution in the Soviet Union =

Sexual services in exchange of payment in the former socialist country

Prostitution in the Soviet Union was not officially recognised domestically as a social phenomenon until 1986.

== History ==
Prostitution was regulated in pre-revolutionary Imperial Russia, with laws requiring registration, regulated living conditions, and rights and obligations for brothel owners. After the Russian Revolution, this system was abolished, though prostitution continued.

In the work of criminologists Andrejs Vilks and Leonīds Tess, it was noted:

In the textbooks on Soviet criminology, it was argued that social sores such as prostitution, drug addiction, etc. are phenomena peculiar to a society where "decaying capitalism" reigns. In the Soviet Encyclopedic Dictionary, published in 1980, it was stated that prostitution arose in a class of antisocialist society and is widespread under capitalism.

— A. Ya. Vilks & L. V. Tess

The topic of prostitution in newspapers, journals and in contemporary writing was taboo. The rationale was that the publication of the existence of this phenomenon could undermine not only the moral foundations of the country, but also significantly weaken the political authority of the country.

=== Pre-revolutionary Russia ===
Prior to Nicholas I, prostitution was banned by law, starting in 1649 when Alexei Mikhailovich ordered city burghers to watch "that there should not be harlots on the streets and lanes".

Starting in 1843, the reign of Nicholas I, until 1908, there was a forced examination of prostitutes in the Russian Empire. There was no prohibition on engaging in prostitution before the revolution, but there was punishment for procuring and pimping. It is estimated that by 1917, 25,000 to 30,000 prostitutes worked in Moscow alone.

=== Civil War Period (1917–1921) ===
Immediately after the February Revolution, all aspects of police regulation of prostitution were abolished. Sex workers created trade unions to defend their rights as other professions had done. Prostitution was dealt with locally under the Commissariat of Public Health, which set up cooperatives to provide alternative employment for prostitutes. The prophylactoria, or treatment centers, provided medical treatment and job-training for prostitutes, leading to a drop in the number of women working as prostitutes where these centers existed. These centers were able to treat roughly half of known prostitutes, indicating that the number of centers were still insufficient.

During the Russian Civil War, the Soviet government instituted "war communism", which "introduced universal labour service for all classes". During this period, various local authorities sometimes persecuted or denigrated prostitutes to dissuade "non-productive behavior". On one occasion in 1918, in order to maximize vigilance ahead of an expected White Guard insurrection in Nizhny Novgorod, Lenin ordered a local Soviet official to, among other measures, organize deportations and shootings of prostitutes whom Lenin believed to be harming the discipline of the Red Army troops in that city. In 1919, a concentration camp of forced labour for women was created in Petrograd; 6,500 women are estimated to have passed through as prisoners, 60% of them suspected of prostitution. At the same time attempts were made to rehabilitate prostitutes as "victims of the capitalist system". At the end of 1919, the Commission for Combating Prostitution under the People's Commissariat of Health was established, and later the Interdepartmental Commission for Combating Prostitution under the People's Commissariat of Social Security.

=== New Economic Policy (NEP) Period (1921–1929) ===
At the beginning of the New Economic Policy (NEP), prostitution experienced a new surge. This is due to 5 million men returning from their military positions at the end of the Russian Civil War in 1923. As these men returned to their previous forms of employment, the women who had been fulfilling their occupations during wartime were forced into unemployment and then into various forms of sex work such as prostitution. Prostitution had initially declined under the Bolsheviks, but high unemployment among women, even white-collar workers, had distressing effects in the mid-1920s. One socialist observed: “Men with money and women without” lead to prostitution. This influx of prostitutes led to it being practiced almost openly by representatives of all strata of society. According to surveys, prostitutes were used by 40% to 60% of the adult male population. There were attempts to reintroduce compulsory medical examinations of prostitutes. The police's attempts to repress prostitution (raids, etc.) were combined with the ideas of social prevention advocated by the Central Commission for Combating Prostitution under the People's Commissariat for Health; during the last program, special dispensaries were created for the re-education and re-introduction of prostitutes into the labour pool. In general, laws and regulations during that initial period did not include any penalization of prostitution itself; even in cases of confrontation with prostitutes, the police were explicitly instructed to treat prostitutes humanely and politely and not to offend their human dignity. In general, specific laws prohibiting prostitution were not introduced into the Soviet codes at that time, or indeed at any point until 1987. However, the involvement of minors in prostitution, pandering and the maintenance of brothels was legislated against.

=== Stalin era ===
While the initial Soviet approach to prostitutes had been relatively mild, prostitutes started to be persecuted again after the end of the New Economic Policy period in 1929. In spite of the lack of a legal basis for such measures, a system was introduced according to which prostitutes were sent to the system of "special institutions of forced labour re-education" supervised by the NKVD - open-type workshops, semi-closed laboratories and suburban colonies of special treatment; in the case of relapse after release from the colony, women were sometimes sent to the camps of the NKVD. The largest colony for prostitutes was located in the Trinity-Sergius Monastery. The treatment in the dispensaries became tougher in 1937 when the dispensaries for former prostitutes were transferred to the Gulag system.

In the early 1930s, suspected prostitutes were subjected to forced return to their home regions. With the deployment of the Great Terror they were sentenced to imprisonment or re-education on the basis that prostitution constituted a remain of the "legacy of the capitalist system". Indeed, organised forms of prostitution were eradicated in Stalin's times. It was believed that prostitution "as a widespread social phenomenon" can not exist in a socialist society because social conditions precipitating it had disappeared; therefore, any cases were the result of atypical personal shortcomings; prostitution was seen as a form of parasitic existence. Prostitution stopped being mentioned in the Soviet press, creating the impression of its absence.

=== Khrushchev and Brezhnev eras ===
In the period from 1955 to 1985, prostitution was officially claimed to be largely absent in the Soviet Union due to the establishment of socialism, so the government did not officially introduce specific laws prohibiting prostitution. However, both criminal law and administrative law were used to prosecute prostitutes under other articles of the criminal and administrative codes, such as 'leading an anti-social parasitic way of life'. Ideological negation did not interfere with the actual existence of prostitution in the USSR, although not in an organised form. Hidden prostitution flourished in the form, for example, of "processing" vacationers at resorts. A rise in prostitution was noted in the 1970s.

Assessment of the scale and social characteristics of prostitution in that period was complicated even in comparison with the period of the 1920s and 1930s. During all of this time, only two empirical studies of prostitution were conducted, but the results were not made public and labelled "For official use". Just as during the Stalin era, nothing was mentioned in the press about domestic prostitution. Even among sociologists, the topic was taboo:

Since prostitution as a social phenomenon in the country of victorious socialism was "eliminated," some "behaviour of women leading an immoral way of life" or "purely legal problems of the composition of crimes preserved in the criminal code of the republic" were investigated "for official use only" by Yu. V. Aleksandrov, A. N. Ignatov, and others. Sociological studies of prostitution (under its various pseudonyms) in the 1970s were conducted under the leadership of M. I. Arsenyeva, as well as by a group of employees of the All-Soviet Research Institute of the Ministry of the Interior including K. K. Goryainov, A. A. Korovin, and E. F. Pobegailo.

At the same time in the Western media, materials on Soviet prostitutes were published regularly. In 1959, after the publication in the British News of the World of an article on hotel prostitution, the Moscow City Committee of the Communist Party of the Soviet Union adopted a resolution on additional measures to combat prostitution (in particular, the hotels were banned from allowing "strangers" in after 23:00), but for Soviet journalists the theme remained forbidden.

=== Perestroika (1986–1991) ===
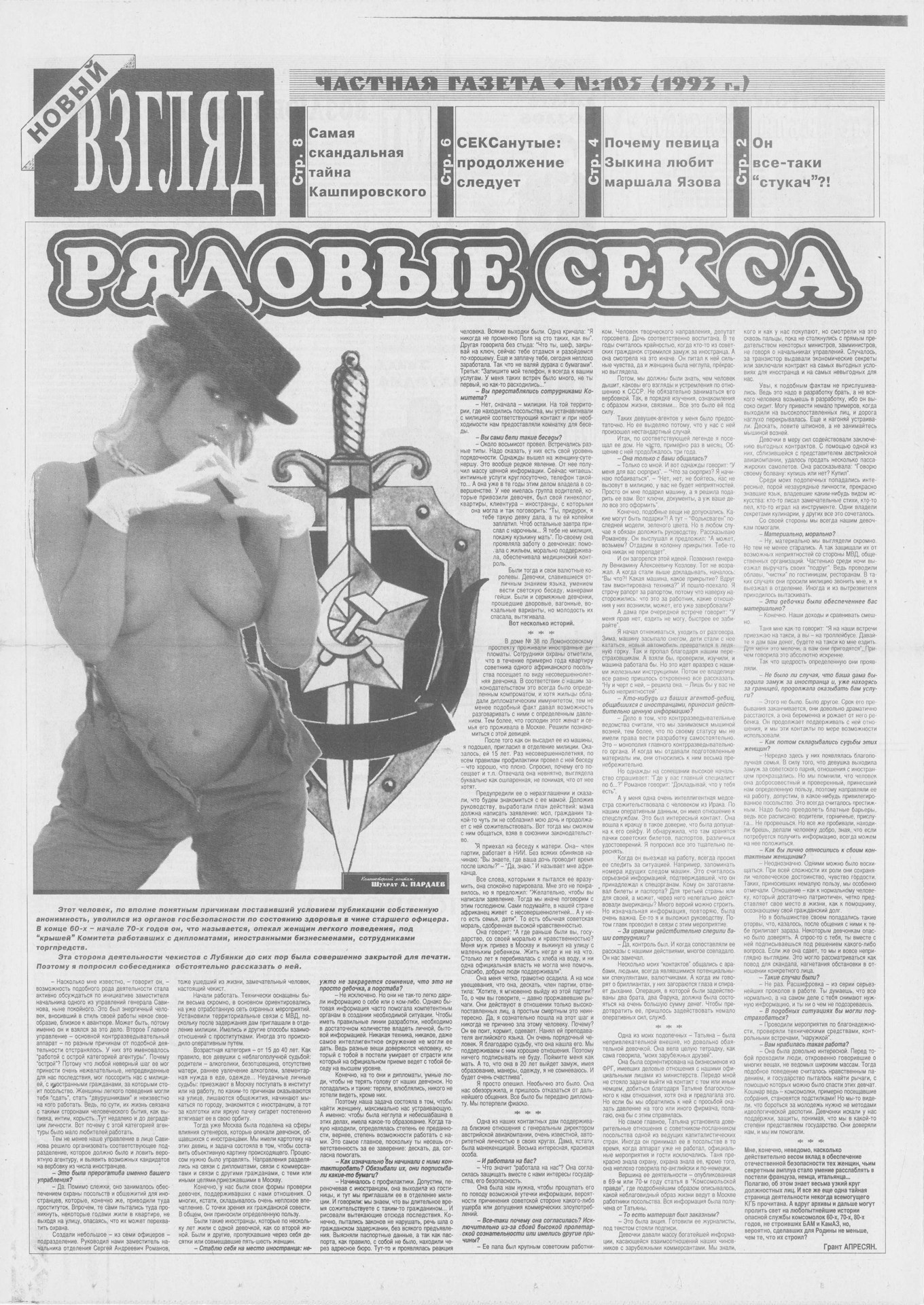
The edition on prostitutes working for the KGB, in the newspaper Novy Vzglyad (1993)

The first publications on prostitution in Soviet periodicals are the articles by Yevgeny Dodolev in the Moskovskij Komsomolets newspaper: "Night Hunters" (October 24, 1986) and "White Dance" (November 19 and continued November 21, 1986). These sensational essays brought Moskovskij Komsomolets to the attention of all unions and raised circulation to a record level. As a consequence, on May 29, 1987, the Code of Administrative Offences of the RSFSR was amended with Article 164-2, which punishes prostitution with a fine of 100 rubles (at that time the monthly salary of a low-skilled worker). A similar article has been preserved in modern legislation.

One of the notable events of the perestroika life of the USSR was the publication of the novel by Vladimir Kunin Interdevochka in the magazine Aurora in 1988. The writer conducted a serious study on the professional activities of prostitutes and for several months followed their work in one of the Leningrad hotels. The working title of the story was "The Prostitute". The editors did not dare to publish the story with such a scandalous title, and Kunin replaced it with a euphemism "Intergirl". Subsequently, this neologism firmly entered the Russian language. The story aroused a violent reaction among the reading audience and the editorial board received a large number of responses. Pyotr Todorovsky directed the film adaptation Intergirl, released to theaters in 1989 and the most popular Soviet film in that year.

=== Post-Soviet dissolution ===
Since the Soviet Union collapsed, women and girls have been forcibly sent to do sex work abroad. See individual articles of post-Soviet states:

- Prostitution in Russia
- Prostitution in Armenia
- Prostitution in Azerbaijan
- Prostitution in Belarus
- Prostitution in Estonia
- Prostitution in Georgia (country)
- Prostitution in Kazakhstan
- Prostitution in Kyrgyzstan
- Prostitution in Latvia
- Prostitution in Lithuania
- Prostitution in Moldova
- Prostitution in Tajikistan
- Prostitution in Turkmenistan
- Prostitution in Ukraine
- Prostitution in Uzbekistan

== See also ==
- Sexpionage
