= Nizhny Tagil mass murder (2002–2007) =

Coordinates: 57°36′00″N 59°58′49″E

The Nizhny Tagil mass murder refers to a mass grave found in early 2007 near the city of Nizhny Tagil in Sverdlovsk Oblast, Russia. The grave contained the confirmed remains of 15 young women and girls, aged between 13 and 25, and an estimated total of up to 30, who were killed by a gang of pimps between 2002 and 2005.

== Discovery ==
The mass grave was discovered by a dog near the village of Levikha, Sverdlovsk Oblast, located 40 kilometres (25 miles) south of the city of Nizhny Tagil, around early 2007. The first press report about the mass grave appeared in the Russian newspaper Komsomolskaya Pravda on February 2, 2007, written by its Urals correspondent Rinat Nizamov. On the same day, the Prosecutor's Office of Sverdlovsk Oblast issued an official statement confirming this information.

== Investigation ==
According to police investigations of the mass grave, the murders of the girls were committed between 2002 and 2005 in the city of Nizhny Tagil, the towns of Kirovgrad and Kushva, and the districts of Nevyansky District and Prigorodny District, all in Sverdlovsk Oblast. Police arrested a gang of eight men, aged 25 to 46, accused of having abducted numerous local girls beginning in 2002, who were then raped, beaten, and under the threat of death forced to work as prostitutes in a brothel disguised as a massage parlor. Some of the girls were forced to write reassuring letters to their families. It was alleged that one of the murdered girls, Elena Chudinova, was the 14-year-old daughter of one of the gang leaders, Eduard "Edik" Chudinov.

Local police were accused of not having properly investigated the missing person reports, as from 2005 to 2006 there were 462 unsolved missing person cases in Nizhny Tagil alone, a city of about 400,000 inhabitants.

=== Convictions ===
Prosecutors connected 14 of the murders with the gang, but sources close to the investigation suspected there were up to 50 victims. In April 2008, Eduard Chudinov was sentenced to life imprisonment, although the case against him for the murder of his daughter Elena was dropped. The other seven members of the gang received prison sentences of between 10 and 24 years.

== Victims ==
Six of the confirmed victims were listed as:

- Olga Bubnova (15 years old) (disappeared in June 2005)
- Viktoria Yushkova (13 years old) (disappeared in June 2005)
- Irina Kuzmina (17 years old) (disappeared in 2004)
- Elena Chudinova (15 years old) (disappeared in July 2004) (daughter of the gang leader Eduard Chudinov)
- Olesya Yakimovich (13 years old) (disappeared in January 2004)
- Evgeniya Konstantinova (13 years old) (disappeared in January 2004)

== In popular culture ==
A fictionalized description of Nizhny Tagil and the murders appears in the novel The Bourne Sanction, by Eric Van Lustbader.

== See also ==
- Female homicides in Ciudad Juárez
- Prostitution in Russia
- Forced prostitution
