= Prostitution in Estonia =

Prostitution in Estonia is legal in itself, but organized prostitution is illegal. Since prostitution is a sensitive indicator that develops with changes in the social environment and the state, it is useful to divide the history of this phenomenon from Estonia's first independence according to the different historical stages of the country.

Firstly, the period of Estonian independence 1918–1940, when the prostitution in Estonia was legalized. Secondly, the period of the Soviet occupation when prostitution was criminalized. Thirdly, since Estonian new independence when prostitution is neither criminalized nor legalized (that is, the selling of and buying of a sexual service is not a crime but prostitution is not considered a profession either).

== Period 1918-1940 ==
=== Legal issues ===
On the first of June 1919, so-called morality guarding, or censoring institution in the bigger cities replaced censoring police. Attitudes to the organization of prostitution derived mainly from health considerations. That was not sufficiently successful and in May 1920, obligatory measures to fight prostitution and sexually transmitted diseases (STD) were issued. Those regulations linked the activities of the “morality guards” to the activities of police, as it was realized that prostitution and criminality were“closely connected’. On 16 December 1927 the Parliament accepted a new law of “Managing Public Health” which handed the fight against prostitution over to the Health and Social Support Department. The police were obliged to give necessary practical help.

=== Statistics ===
Because prostitution was legal in 1918–1940, the data from that period is remarkably precise and allows giving an adequate overview of the phenomenon. The number of prostitutes had been relatively stable throughout that period, showing only a slight increase. For instance, in 1919 and 1920, there were 1187 and 1141 registered prostitutes in Estonian cities, and the number remained the same until the 1930s. Prostitution mainly spread in the greater cities, Tallinn and Tartu, but also in Narva and Pärnu. The proportion in other cities was very modest. There were 387 permanent prostitutes registered in Tallinn in 1920, and 455 in 1940. In Tartu, the numbers were 53 in 1922 and 156 in 1938. There were also illegal, unregistered individual prostitutes of whom there is very little and non-systematic data. In the mid-1920s the number of Estonian hidden prostitutes was estimated to be up to 2000–2500. Police measures were predominantly directed to uncovering and registering this contingent, because unlike the registered prostitutes, neither unofficial prostitute nor their clients went through regular medical check-ups.

Prostituting took place mainly in “pleasure flats” where the woman was operating as a “free tenant”. Each of these apartments had approximately 4-9 women. In 1940, there were 47 of such apartments registered. The majority (90%) of Tallinn prostitutes in the beginning of the 1920s were Estonians, 8% were Russians and the rest other nationalities. Thirty per cent were up to 20 years old, but the largest group was 20–25 years old (about 50%) and 26–30 years old were represented at around 15%. About 30% were born in Tallinn, 60% from elsewhere in Estonia and about 10% from abroad.

== Soviet period ==
Along with Estonia's occupation by the Soviet Union, attitudes to prostitution changed drastically. Legalization of prostitution was replaced by total denial and was made criminal. For instance, Tallinn City Moral Censoring Unit and Ambulatory of STDs which had been controlling the prostitutes and their health, was now liquidated on 16 November 1940, only a few months after occupation. Prostitutes who were registered at the police were repressed as “socially alien beings” and were listed, along with thousands of other people, to be deported from Estonia in 1941.

During the Soviet period, pornography, prostitution and organizing prostitution were criminalized and belonged to the phenomena called parasitic lifestyle. There were three relevant paragraphs in the Criminal Law: Criminal Code of Estonian Soviet Socialist Republic (ESSR) (paragraph 200) - preparing or distributing a pornographic item; paragraph 201 - keeping a brothel; paragraph 201-3 - begging, vagrant or the parasitic lifestyle.

Pimping was not considered in the Criminal Law of ESSR. In reality those paragraphs that were related to prostitution were hardly ever used. The reason was absence of prostitution as a mass phenomenon in Soviet Estonia and indifference to it from that part of the government. In Tallinn, only a type of systematically operating prostitutes existed - the so-called “foreign currency prostitutes” who were only serving foreigners. Since the KGB kept a vigilant eye on foreigners, the activities of those prostitutes were only feasible with the knowledge and control of this structure. There are some reasons to suggest that some prostitutes serving foreigners were used as informants by the KGB.

== Post-Soviet period ==
Certain changes started in the mid-1980s when the first signs of private businesses emerged. That also brought along differentiation of incomes. The increase in the relations with foreigners had a great impact on the following processes. Due to the rise in prostitution, a new administrative liability for the activity was introduced in 1987. In 1998, the police registered over 268 females who had been caught performing sexual services for money in hostels and hotels.

Prostitution is currently legal in Estonia, but pimping is prohibited. Forced prostitution and other abusive activities which surround the sex trade are also outlawed. UNAIDS estimate there are 1,000 prostitutes in the country.

== Child prostitution ==
An inquiry by police officers in the capital Tallinn from 2006 estimated that 27% of the 1,000 sex workers in the city were under 18, and a research study by ECPAT has estimated a similar proportion within the country.

== Sex trafficking ==
Estonia is a source, transit, and destination country for women and girls subjected to sex trafficking. Estonian women and children are subjected to sex trafficking within Estonia and in other European countries. Women are increasingly exposed to trafficking as a result of sham marriages outside of Estonia; the women enter the marriages willingly, but their passports are confiscated and they are forced into prostitution. Stateless residents in Estonia were especially vulnerable to trafficking. Vietnamese nationals subjected to sexual exploitation transit Estonia en route to other EU countries.

The United States Department of State Office to Monitor and Combat Trafficking in Persons ranks Estonia as a 'Tier 1' country.

== See also ==
- Prostitution in the Soviet Union
