= Prostitution in Uzbekistan =

Prostitution in Uzbekistan is illegal, but prostitution has increased within the country since the collapse of the Soviet Union. UNAIDS estimated there to be 22,000 sex workers in the country in 2019. Many of the women have turned to prostitution in Uzbekistan because of poverty.

Law enforcement is inconsistent. Some police officers will harass prostitutes and extort "protection money" from them. Sometimes prostitutes work with police as informants to avoid being arrested.

== HIV ==
HIV is a problem in the country, but the true situation is unknown as the Government has manipulated figure to downplay the problem. Prostitutes are a high risk group, and has been blamed for a rise in HIV infections. In 2004, of the reported 11,000 cases of HIV in the country, 20% were sex workers.

Clients are reluctant to use condoms. UNAIDS estimate 50% condom usage during paid-sex. 95% of Uzbek migrants to Russia use prostitutes whilst in Russia according to a 2009 survey, sometimes this is unprotected sex. Some get infected with HIV and then pass this on to Uzbek prostitutes on their return.

2016 estimates of HIV prevalence amongst sex workers is 2.9%

== Sex trafficking ==
Uzbekistan is a source and destination country for women and children subjected to sex trafficking. Uzbek women and children are subjected to sex trafficking in the Middle East, Eurasia, and Asia, and also internally in brothels, clubs, and private residences.

Article 135 of the criminal code prohibits both sex trafficking and forced labour, prescribing penalties of three to 12 years imprisonment. The government reported that 250 of the crimes investigated in 2016 were related to sexual exploitation.

The United States Department of State Office to Monitor and Combat Trafficking in Persons ranks Uzbekistan as a 'Tier 2 Watch List' country.

== See also ==
- Prostitution in the Soviet Union
