= Mongolian Gender Equality Center =

Mongolian non-governmental organization

- Founded: January 4, 2002
- Type: Non-profit; NGO
- Location: Ulaanbaatar, Mongolia
- Services: fighting human trafficking, and promoting gender equality in Mongolia
- Website: en.stoptrafficking.mn

The Mongolian Gender Equality Center (MGEC; Mongolian: Хүйсийн тэгш эрх төв) is a non-governmental organization based in Ulaanbaatar, Mongolia, established in 2002 to fight the growing crime of human trafficking in Mongolia, with a focus on protecting young women and girls, the primary group affected.

The MGEC has lobbied to improve legislation against human trafficking. It also runs prevention, awareness and advocacy programs relating to human trafficking, along with providing legal advocacy, shelter, counseling services and vocational training for repatriated victims of trafficking. The organization has developed a range of educational materials and publications for social workers, teachers, students, police and other officials. Recently, the MGEC has been developing educational tools for parents and teachers on child safety to help prevent sexual abuse of children.

== Notable areas of work ==
=== Gender Equality ===
MGEC has developed and published a handbook on gender equality (in partnership with the National Pedagogical University and the Science and Technology University of Mongolia). In addition, the organization runs educational programs from primary school to university, and is also currently a member of a lobby group that drafts laws on gender equality.

=== Victim protection ===
In 2007 MGEC initiated the "Direct Assistance to Victims of Human Trafficking Program" with assistance from the International Organization for Migration. Since then the program has provided 679 VOTs with assistance from the MGEC including repatriation, rehabilitation and reintegration into the Mongolian community. Between 2016 and 2017, 63 victims of trafficking were identified and provided with complete reintegration assistance.

=== Foreign marriage ===
Between 2000 and 2008 the number of marriages of Mongolian women to foreign nationals increased from 79 to 3,485, and 67.8% of these were to Korean nationals. In July 2008, MGEC, together with the Government of the Republic of Korea and the Mongolian Ministry of Social Welfare & Labour, provided a one-day training program for Mongolian brides. The program focused on Korean culture, language and society, the legal regulations regarding marriage and divorce in Korea, and gave extensive advice on trafficking, domestic violence and abuse.

== Partner organizations ==
MGEC is a member of Global Alliance Against Traffic in Women (GAATW).

== See also ==
- Human Trafficking in Mongolia
- United Nations Global Initiative to Fight Human Trafficking
