= Prostitution in Mongolia =

Prostitution in Mongolia is illegal but widespread in some areas. UNAIDS estimated there were about 7,300 sex workers in the country, based on government-reported data from the 2020–2024 Global AIDS Monitoring cycle. Some women in Mongolia turn to prostitution through poverty.

Sex trafficking and child prostitution, including child sex tourism, are problems in the country.

== Overview ==
Although illegal, prostitution in Mongolia is on the rise, partially due to the growing mining industry.

In the capital, Ulaanbaatar, prostitution was previously centred on the park in front of Ulaanbaatar Hotel, where most wealthy westerners stayed when in the country. In recent years it has moved into karaoke bars, hotels, saunas and massage parlours. Women's activists claim there are hundreds of these establishments in the city. Whilst there are occasional raids by the police, the establishments generally operate untroubled by law enforcement.

The number of men employed at the Oyu Tolgoi copper mine and the Tavan Tolgoi coal fields has led to a great rise in the number of sex workers in these areas.

Along the main highways leading to the China border, truck drivers will exchange diesel for sex. The prostitutes along the highways are known as "diesel girls".

== Sexual health ==
As sex work in the country is underground due to the legal situation, sex workers have little access to sexual health services. STIs are high amongst sex workers with 30% having syphilis. The National AIDS Foundation fear an accelerated HIV spread.

== Sex tourism ==
Sex tourism occurs in the country. Police report that 1,500 women and adolescents are working in bars, massage parlours and hotels catering to foreigners and tourists.

Japanese and South Korean tourists engage in child sex tourism in the country. There is often familial complicity of the children involved.

== Sex trafficking ==
Mongolia is a source and destination country for women, and children subjected to sex trafficking. One of the major destinations is China, where the victims are forced into indentured repayment of the "fee" to smuggle them abroad. Women and girls are subjected to sex trafficking in Mongolian massage parlors, hotels, bars, and karaoke clubs. Women are subjected to forced prostitution after entering into commercially brokered marriages to Chinese men and, with decreased frequency, South Korean men. Traffickers sometimes use drugs, fraudulent social networking, online job opportunities, or English language programs to lure Mongolian victims into sex trafficking. A significant number of Mongolian victims from rural and poor economic areas are subjected to sex trafficking in Ulaanbaatar and border areas.

Article 113 of the criminal code prohibits all forms of human trafficking; however, authorities frequently charge suspected sex traffickers under article 124, which criminalizes inducing others into and organizing prostitution but does not require the element of force, fraud, or coercion that defines a trafficking crime. Authorities prosecuted 37 defendants and convicted eight under article 124 in 2016; however, it was unclear how many of these cases had direct links to sex trafficking.

The continued development of the mining industry in southern Mongolia has led to an increase in internal and international migration, increasing the risk of trafficking, particularly along the China–Mongolia border. Young women are at risk of being exploited in prostitution by truck drivers transporting coal who are awaiting border crossing. Mongolian children are sometimes subjected to sex trafficking, often with familial complicity. Previous reports allege corruption among Mongolian officials impedes the government's anti-trafficking efforts.

The United States Department of State Office to Monitor and Combat Trafficking in Persons ranks Mongolia as a 'Tier 2 Watch List' country.
