= University of Finance and Economics (Mongolia) =

University in Bayanzürkh, Ulaanbaatar, Mongolia

The University of Finance and Economics
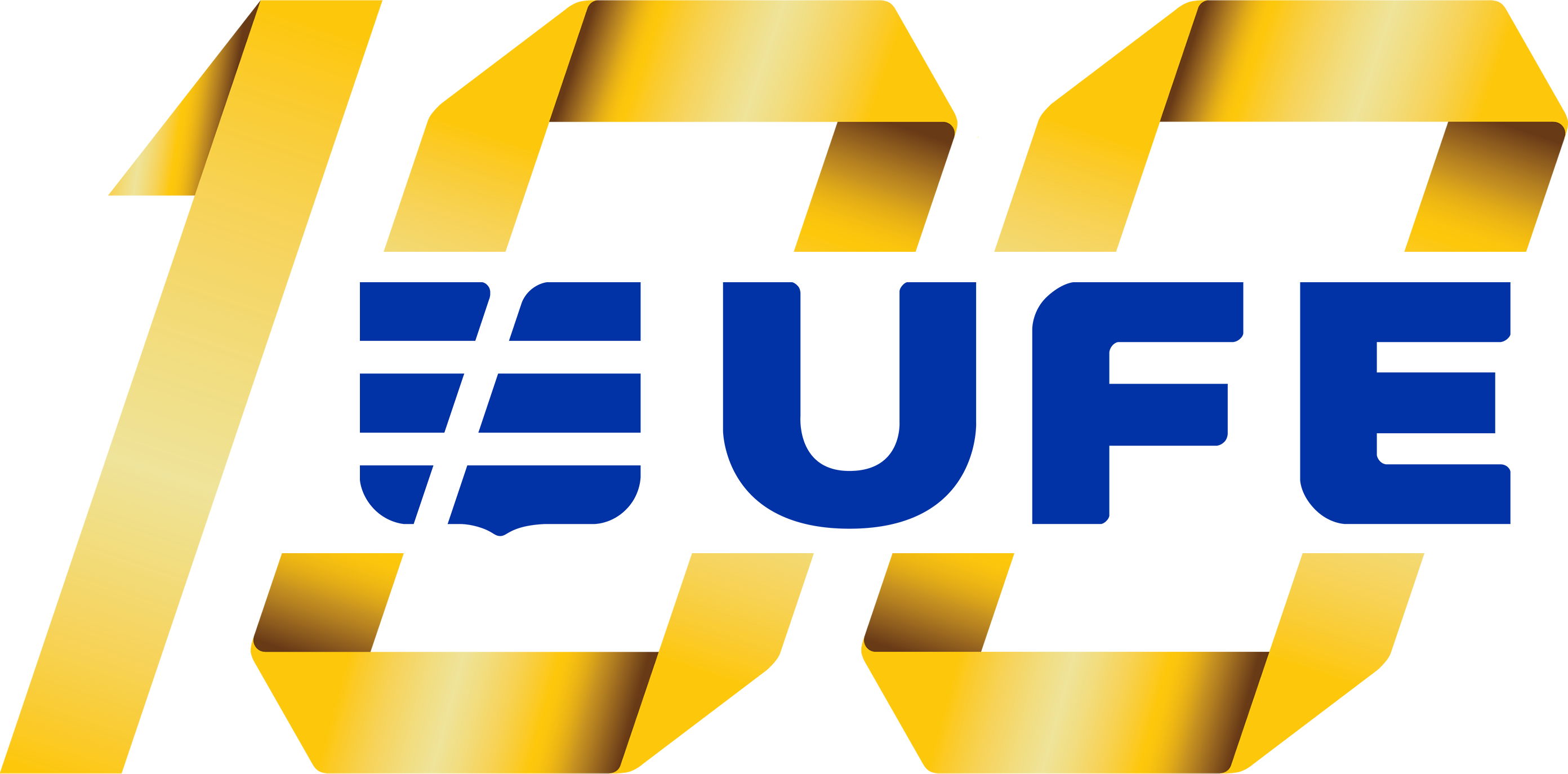
- Motto: Wisdom is the wealth of highest value
- Established: 1924; 102 years ago
- Location: Bayanzürkh, Ulaanbaatar, Mongolia
- Nickname: UFE
- Website: www.ufe.edu.mn/english/

The University of Finance and Economics (UFE; Mongolian: Санхүү эдийн засгийн их сургууль) of Mongolia is one of the oldest higher education institutions in the country.

== Academic programs ==
The university offers undergraduate, graduate, and doctoral programs across various disciplines, including business, economics, law, education, engineering, and social sciences. Undergraduate programs include:

- Business-related fields such as Banking Management, Marketing, Accountancy, Financial Management, and International Trade
- Education programs in subjects such as Preschool and Primary Education, Social Studies, and Foreign Languages
- Humanities and social sciences including Philosophy, Sociology, and Public Administration
- Technical disciplines such as Electrical and Mechanical Engineering, Mining Technology, and Occupational Safety
- Creative fields including Graphic Design and Interior Design

The university also offers international joint undergraduate programs in collaboration with institutions in South Korea, China, Taiwan, Canada, Russia, and Japan, covering areas such as Global Management, Finance, Information Systems, and Tourism Management.

Graduate programs cover areas such as Business Administration, Financial Management, Entrepreneurship and Innovation, Public Administration, and Applied Economics. Doctoral programs are offered in Business Administration and Management.

Professional qualifications include programs aligned with ACCA, CGMA, and CFA certifications.

== International cooperation ==
The University of Finance & Economics is actively engaged in projects and partnership with higher education institutions, businesses and professional associations from over 20 countries around the world including USA, Canada, UK, the Republic of Korea, China, India, Vietnam, Japan, Taiwan, Malaysia, Cyprus, Estonia, France, Germany, Russia, Kazakhstan, Belarus, Kirgizstan, Armenia and Romania.

== National cooperation ==
UFE collaborates with institutions and companies in Mongolia's banking, finance, stock market, and business sectors through joint research projects, internships, workplace-based learning, and scholarship programs.

=== Blockchain verification ===
In 2019, UFE introduced blockchain-based diploma verification, becoming the first university in Mongolia to do so.

=== Interdisciplinary studies ===
The Department of Interdisciplinary Studies was established in 2019 to promote cross-sector research and innovation in social, economic, environmental, and scientific fields.

=== Entrepreneurship programs ===
UFE offers "Entrepreneurship and Innovation" programs at the graduate, undergraduate, and high school levels. Undergraduate students may also enroll in related courses and participate in cooperative education and startup initiatives.

=== Work-based learning ===
UFE participates in the Erasmus+ MONGWBL project, supporting work-based learning in collaboration with banking and tourism associations.

=== Academic entrepreneurship ===
In partnership with the Ministry of Science and Education and the Mongolian Academy of Sciences, UFE launched the Academic Entrepreneurship Program to build entrepreneurial capacity among researchers, based on the triple-helix model.

== Notable alumni ==
- Yumjaagiin Tsedenbal, General Secretary of the Central Committee of the Mongolian People's Revolutionary Party of Mongolia (1974–1984)
- Jigjidiin Mönkhbat, 1968 Summer Olympics silver medalist in men's freestyle middleweight wrestling

== Student union ==
The University of Finance and Economics has a Student Union formed by students and supported by the university administration. It organizes socio-cultural and extracurricular academic activities and is governed by a Student Assembly, with day-to-day operations managed by an Executive Committee.
