= Prostitution in Kazakhstan =

Prostitution in Kazakhstan is itself legal, but acts facilitating prostitution, such as operating a brothel or prostitution ring, are illegal. Forced prostitution and prostitution connected to organised crime are prohibited. Prostitution is a serious problem. NGOs reported that criminal prostitution rings often included local law enforcement officials.

Estimates of the number of prostitutes in Kazakhstan vary from 4,000 to 25,000, including a number from Kyrgyzstan, Uzbekistan and Ukraine.

Sex workers often face harassment, extortion, arbitrary arrest, rape and violence from the police.

HIV testing is mandatory for male sex workers, however in practice female sex workers are also forced to have the test. Any sex worker who continues to offer services after a positive test could be prosecuted for the deliberate spreading of an infection.

== Legislation ==
As part of the USSR, Kazakh SSR, prostitution was banned on 13 July 1987; For the initial offence, a fine of 100 rubles was levied, for a second offence, 200 rubles.

After independence, Kazakhstan abolished the laws banning prostitution in January 2001. Related activities are still a criminal offence:

- Organising or running a brothel
- Allowing premises to be used as a brothel
- Living off the earnings from prostitution
- Procuring for the purposes of prostitution
- Forcing a person into prostitution

In 2009, a group of disabled people in Karaganda asked the country's parliament for legalisation to subsidise commercial sex for the disabled. They were unsuccessful.

Kazakhstan passed a law designed to combat trafficking in persons on 4 July 2013.

On 1 January 2015, Kazakhstan introduced an administrative offence, article 449 "Attaching in public places," which includes, among other things, prostitutes soliciting potential clients in public. Prostitutes quietly standing on the spot were not affected. As this is an administrative offence, any fines imposed cannot be appealed.

597 self-declared sex workers sent an open letter to President Nursultan Nazarbayev, the UN and OSCE in August 2016. They asked that prostitution be legislated and regulated. They argued that regulation would provide better working conditions and security for the sex-workers and that taxes on prostitution would contribute to the Kazakhstani government coffers.

== Prostitution of minors ==
Prostitution of minors is a problem in Kazakhstan. In Almaty, it is estimated that a third of prostitutes are underage.

Almaty airport is used as a transit hub for Central Asian girls being sent to Amsterdam, Korea and the United Arab Emirates.

Law enforcement agencies are trying to break up the gangs behind this. Officials claim that the number of minors involved in prostitution is systematically decreasing within the country.

== Sex trafficking ==
Kazakhstan is a source, transit, and destination country for men, women, and girls trafficked from Uzbekistan, Kyrgyzstan, Tajikistan, and Ukraine to Kazakhstan and on to Russia and the United Arab Emirates (U.A.E.) for purposes of commercial sexual exploitation and forced labour in the construction and agricultural industries. Kazakhstani men and women are trafficked internally and to the U.A.E., Azerbaijan, Turkey, Israel, Greece, Russia, and Germany and the United States for purposes of forced labor and sexual exploitation.

The United States Department of State Office to Monitor and Combat Trafficking in Persons ranks Kazakhstan as a 'Tier 2' country.

== See also ==
- Prostitution in the Soviet Union
