= China–Mongolia border =

International border

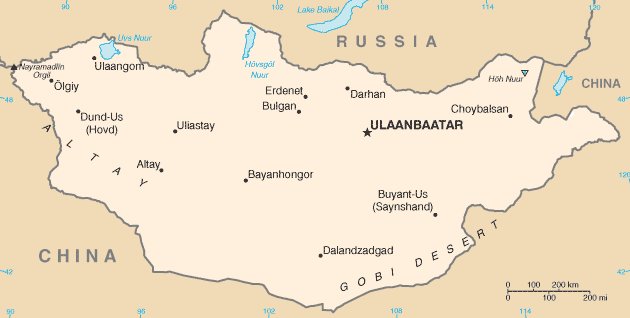
Map of Mongolia, with China to the south and east

Chinese and Mongolian boundary markers

The China–Mongolia border is the international border between China and Mongolia. It runs from west to east between the two tripoints with Russia for 4,630 km (2,880 mi), with most of the boundary area lying in the Gobi Desert. It is the world's fourth longest international border.

== Description ==
The border starts in the west at the western tripoint with Russia in the Altai Mountains, located just 100 kilometres (62 miles) east of the China-Kazakhstan-Russia tripoint. From there it runs overland in a generally south-eastwards direction, with straight line sections predominant in the Gobi Desert section, down to the southernmost point of Mongolia just north of the 40°30 line of latitude. From there it proceeds overland in a north-eastwards direction, over to the Greater Khingan mountains near Mongolia's easternmost point. From there the border veers to the north-west and then west, utilising the Khalkhyn Gol river for a stretch before running through Buir Lake, and then turning sharply to the north-east up to the eastern Russian tripoint.

== History ==
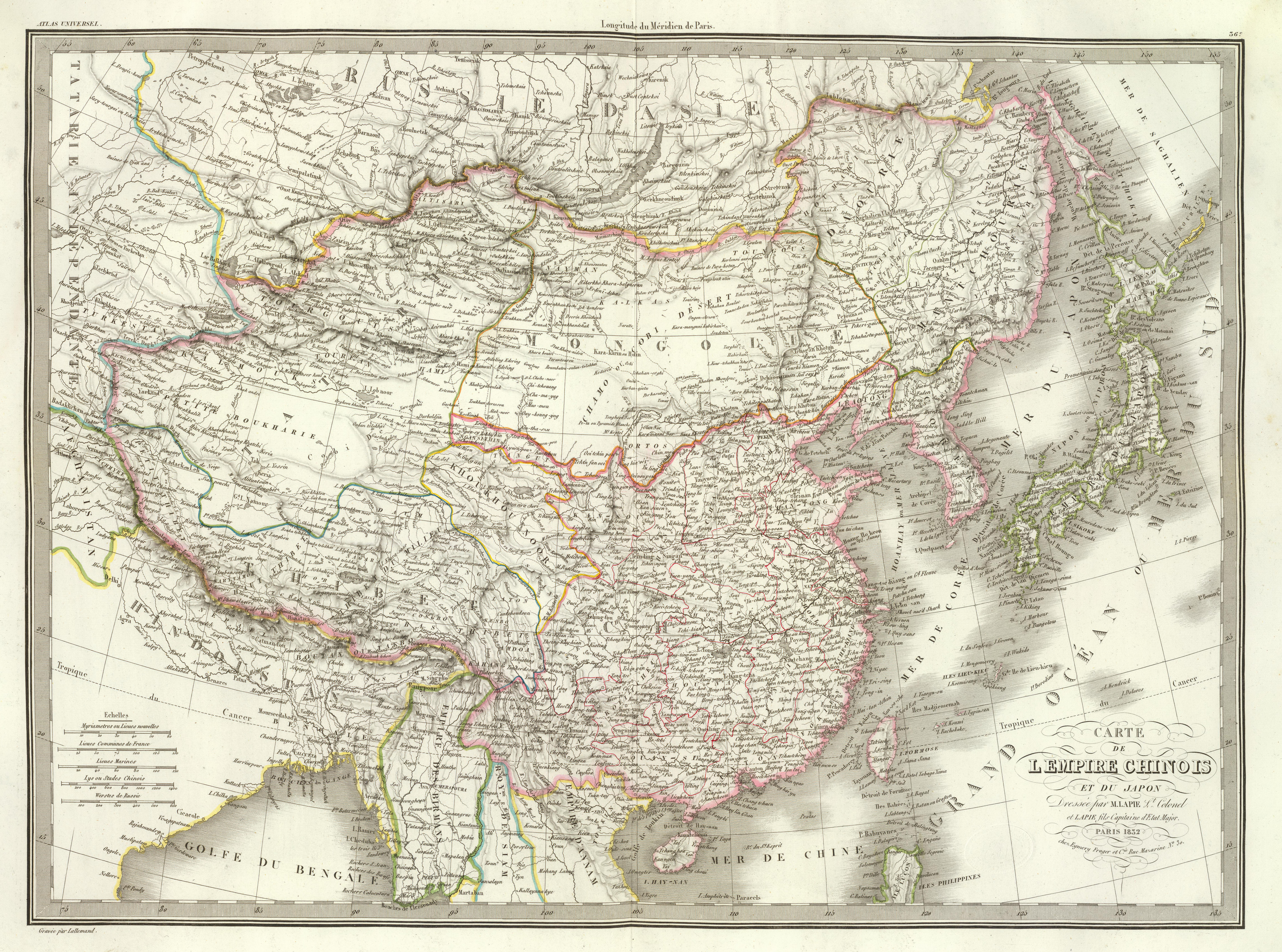
Mongolia within Qing China

Russia had expanded far into Siberia during the course of the 17th century, bringing it into conflict with Qing China, which at that time ruled over Outer Mongolia. Much of the line of the today's Mongolia–Russia border line was set by the Treaty of Kyakhta between Russia and China.

With China engulfed in chaos during the Xinhai Revolution, Mongolian nationalists seized the opportunity to declare Outer Mongolia independent from China, with the support of Russia. In 1915 the Second Treaty of Kyakhta was signed, by which Russia acknowledged formal Chinese suzerainty over Mongolia, albeit with Russia maintaining significant influence, leaving the country in effect as a semi-autonomous condominium. Following the Russian Revolution in 1917 China invaded Mongolia in an attempt to re-assert full control, however they were ultimately repulsed by Mongolian and Soviet Russian forces, with Mongolia once again declaring independence from China in 1921. China's refusal to recognise Mongolian independence meant that no formal border delimitation was conducted, though the remoteness and inhospitable, scarcely populated boundary terrain meant that this was in practice not a pressing issue. However, following Japan's invasion of Manchuria in 1931 and disputes over the Nomonhan region, Mongolia and the Japanese puppet-state of Manchukuo delimited a small section of their eastern frontier in 1935–39 in the vicinity of Buir Lake, though Japan was defeated in the Second World War leaving the status of this agreement in doubt.

Following a plebiscite, and assurances from the USSR that they would not interfere in China's restive Xinjiang province, China agreed to recognise Mongolia's independence in 1946. Disputes soon arose over the border, notably over the gold-rich Baytik Mountains in 1947, and further work on boundary delimitation was hampered by the Chinese Civil War. With the Communists in power in China from 1949, relations with Mongolia steadily improved, and the two countries signed a treaty on 26 December 1962 delimiting their common frontier. A full border demarcation then occurred from 1963 to 1964 and a final treaty with a detailed set of maps agreed upon on 30 June 1964. Though relations have at times been tense since then, notably during the 1960s Sino-Soviet split in which Mongolia sided with the USSR, the border has remained where it is and relations between the two states have remained generally cordial.

== Sex trafficking ==
Mongolian and Chinese women and girls are sex trafficked across the border. There are large mines and other heavy industrial operations located in the border region containing large workforces of isolated men; these sites, including the ones in Tavan Tolgoi coal deposits, have been a focal point for prostitution and sex trafficking.

== Border crossings ==
There are several official border crossings:

- Bulgan – Takashiken
- Bichigt – Zuun Khatavch
- Khangi – Mandula
- Zamyn-Üüd – Erenhot
- Sheveekhuren – Sekhee
- Sumber – Arxa/Aershan

== Settlements near the border ==
=== China ===
- Çağaan Ğol
- Erenxot
- Narın Bulag
- Ärşan
- Yirşi
- Xandğay
- Asır

=== Mongolia ===
- Jarğalant
- Mandal Sum
- Eñger Xulasaa
- Cağaan Ovoo
- Ulaan-Uul
- Senterbanşan
- Xavaaxaxaro
- Xalxyn Ğol
- Monğolrıba
- Şavarta

== Historical maps ==
Historical maps of the border from west to east from the International Map of the World, middle 20th century (partial):

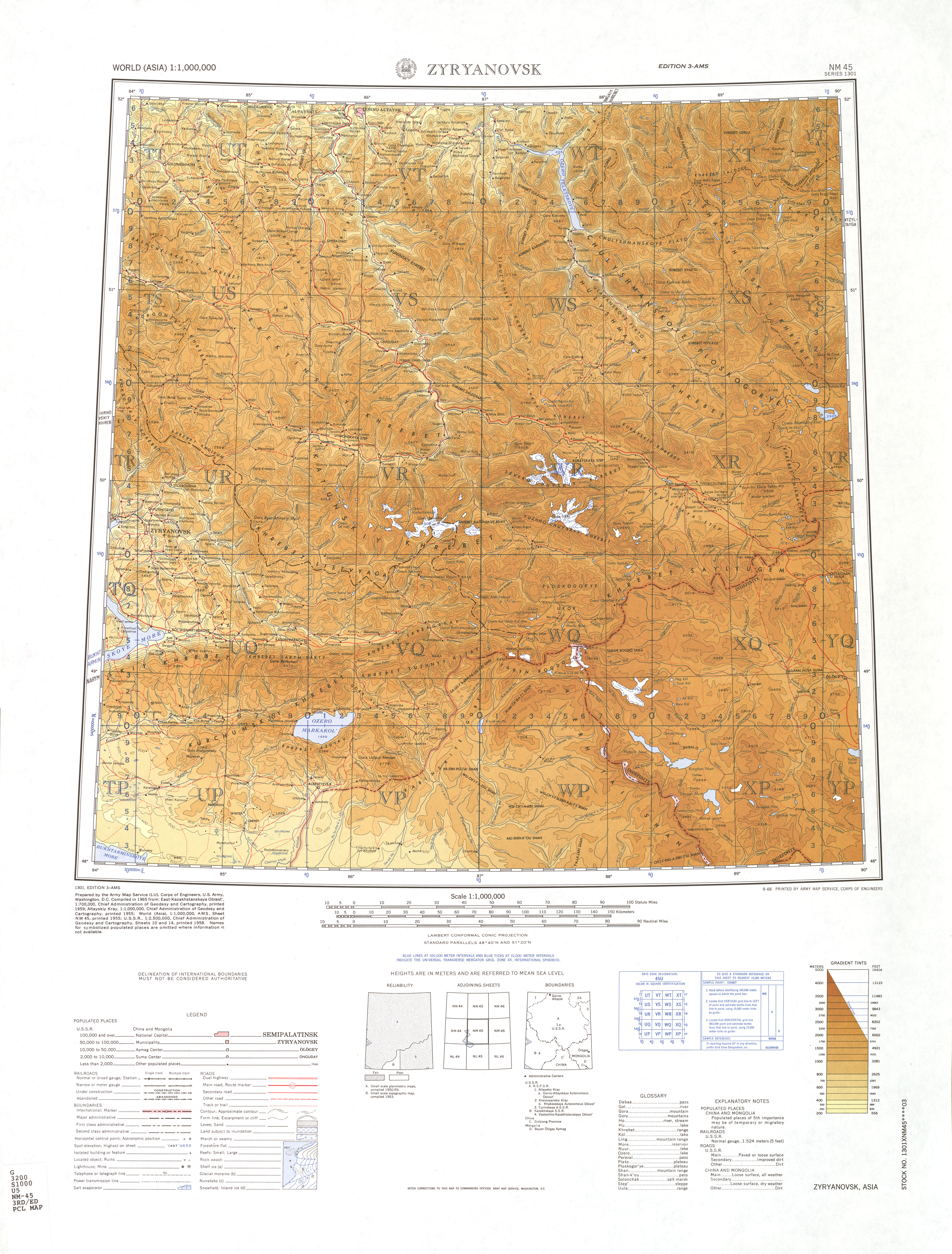

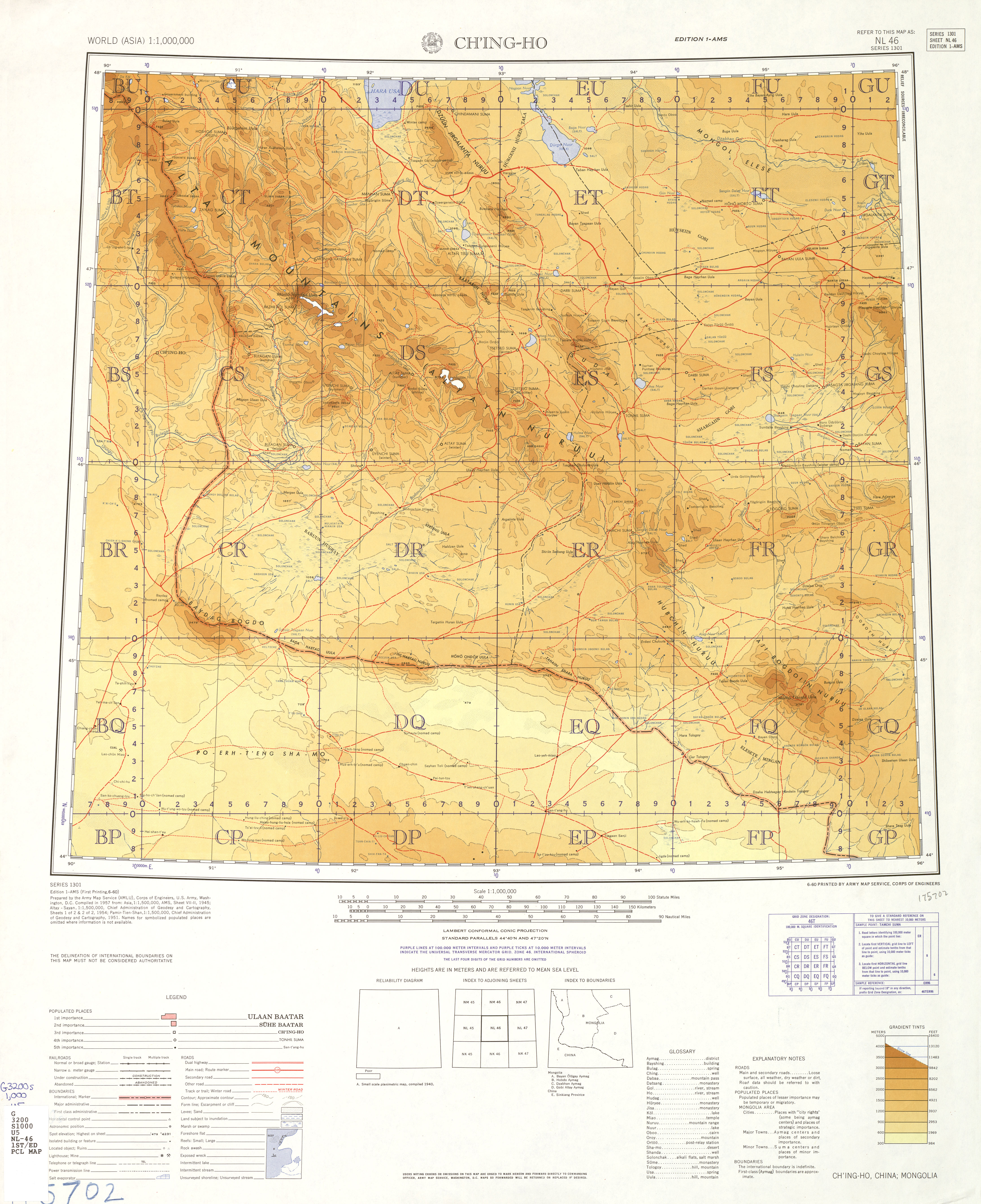

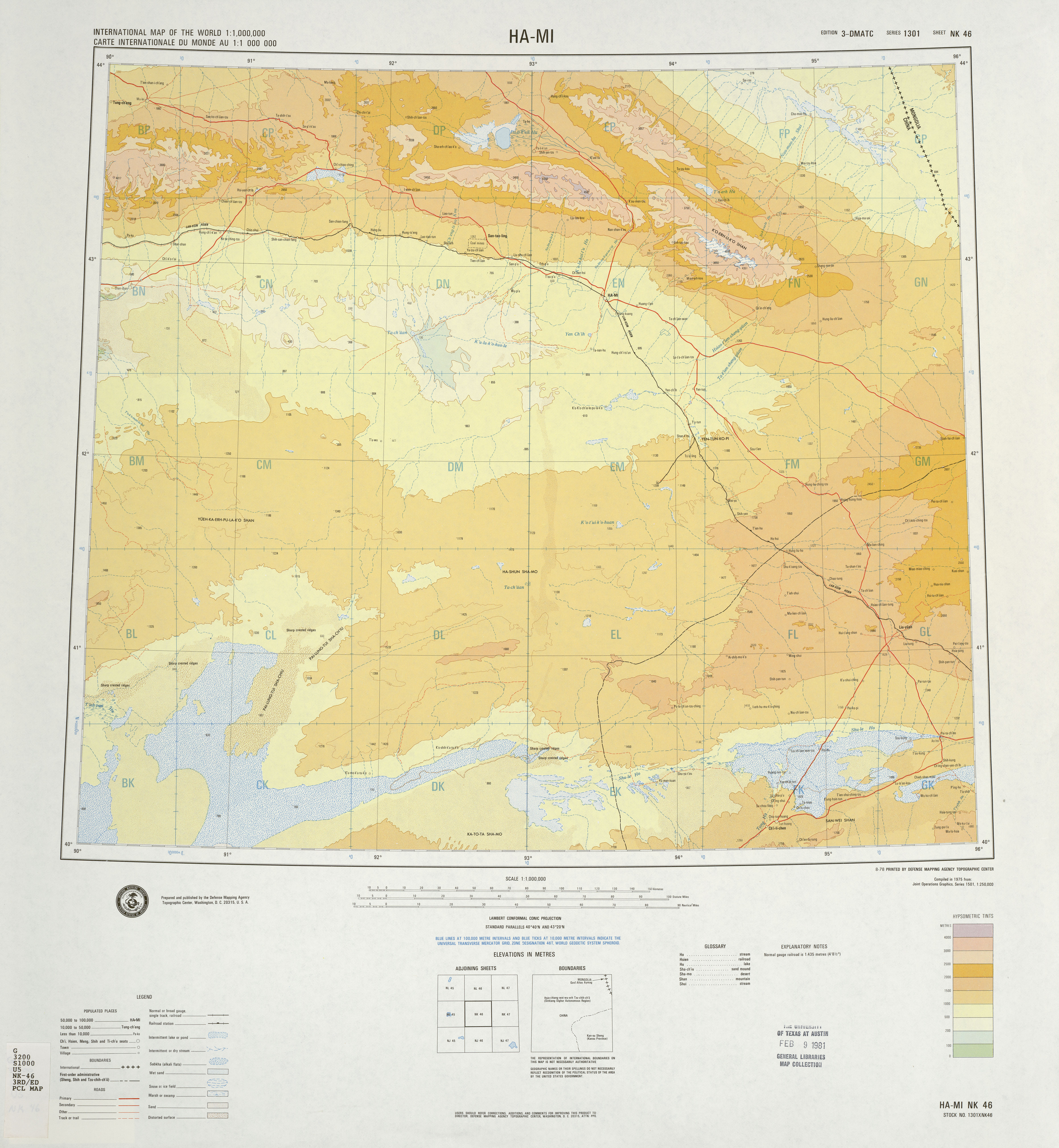

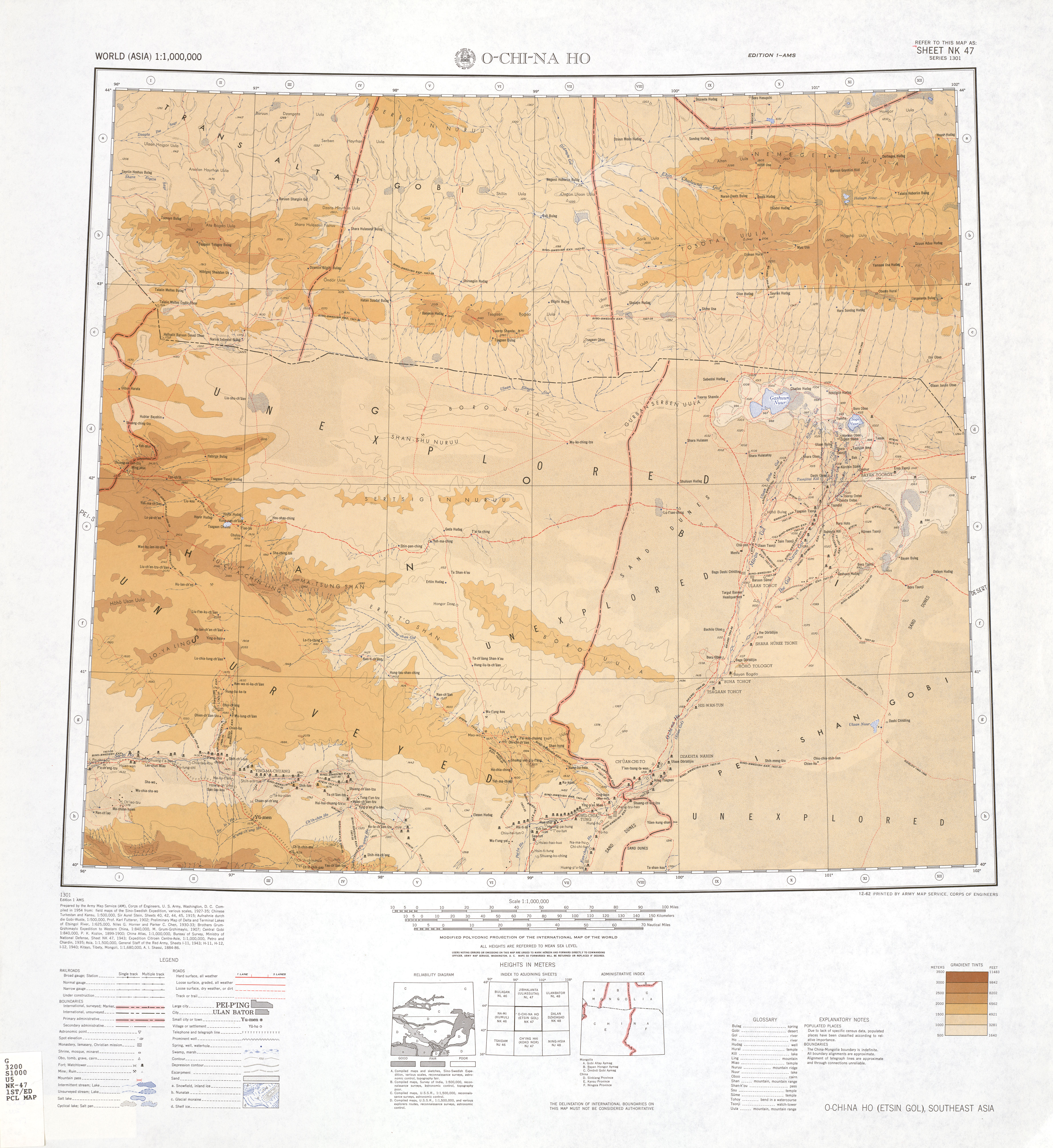

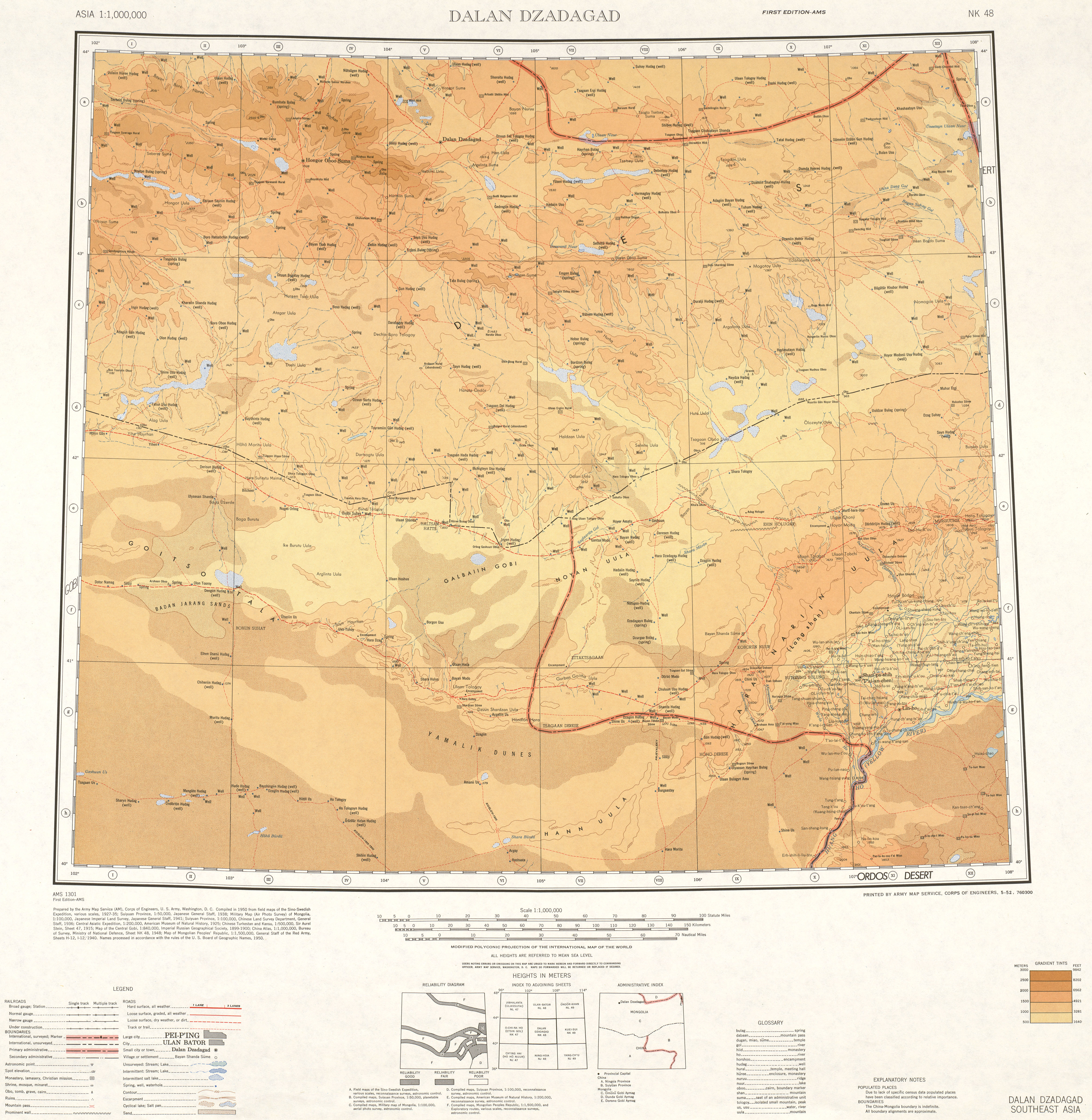

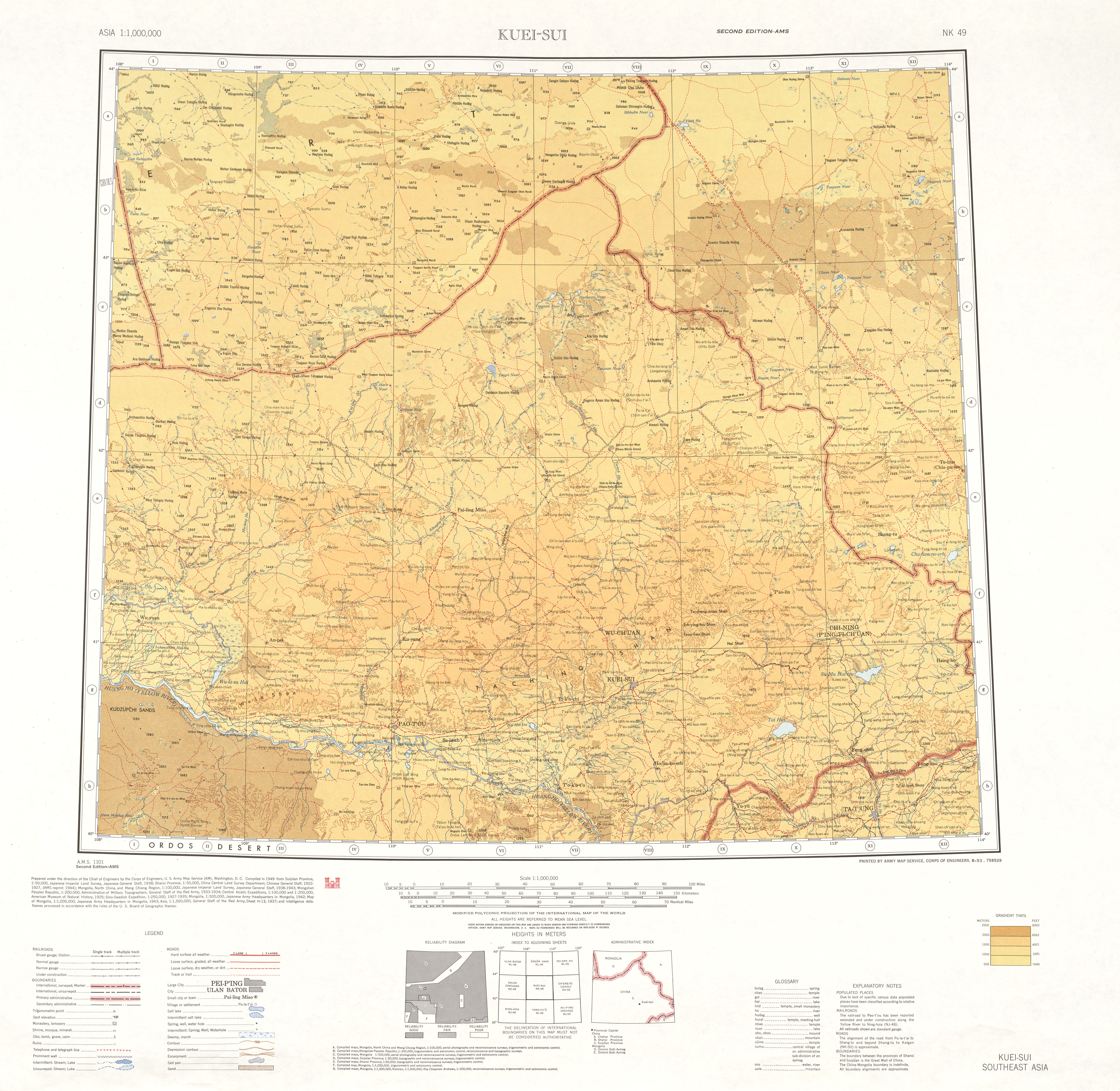

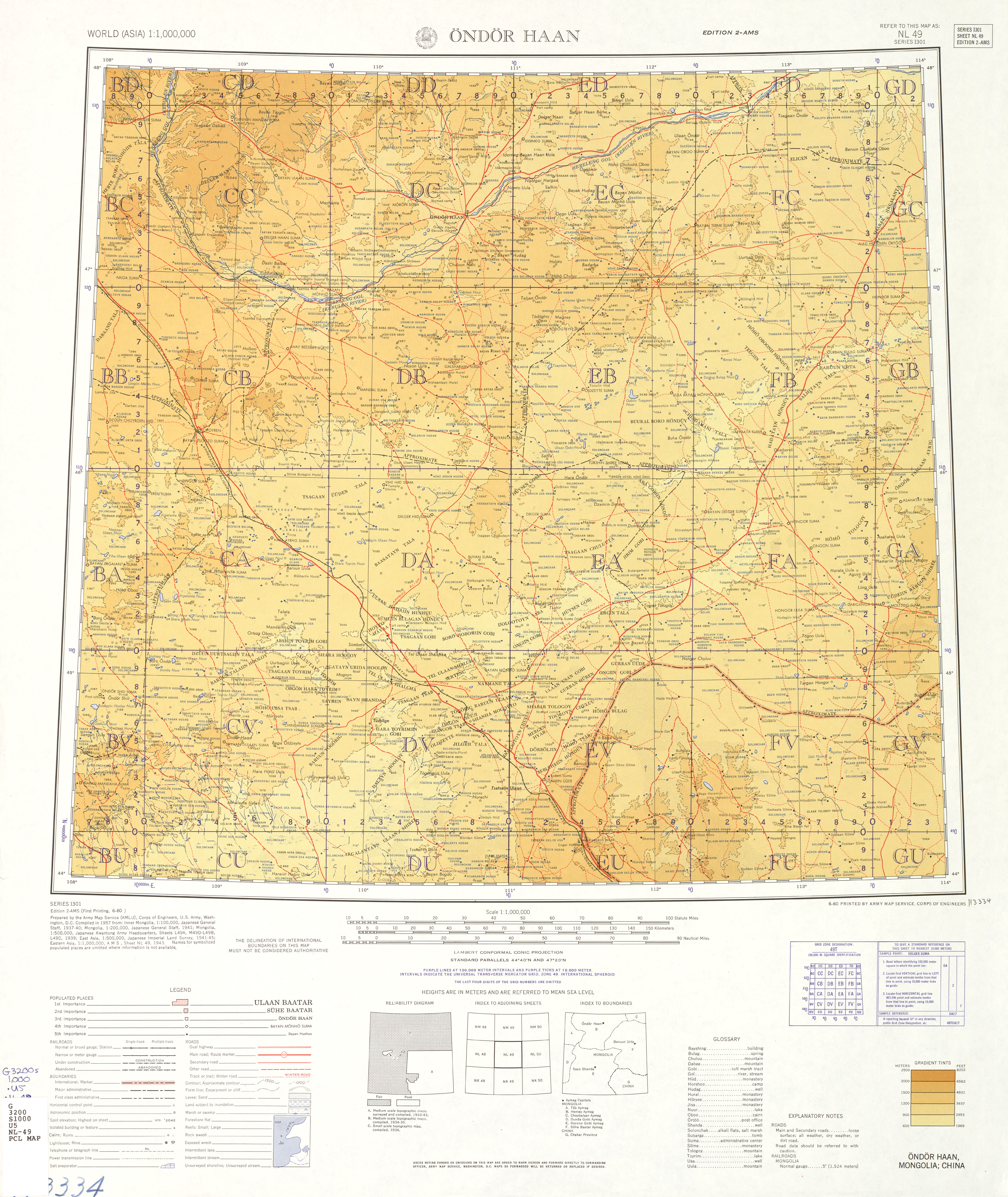

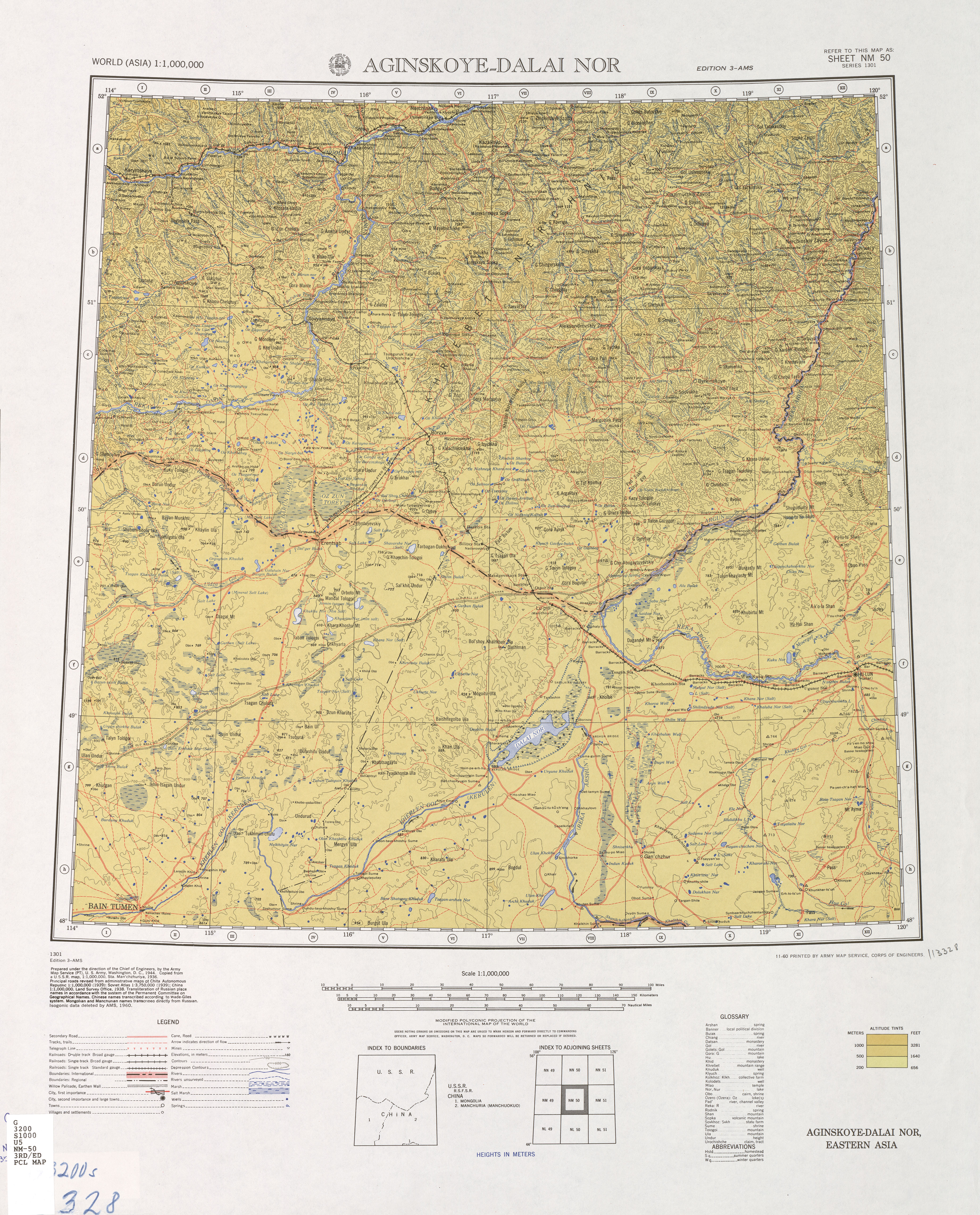

== See also ==
- Ports of entry of China
- China–Mongolia relations
