= Feminist perspectives on sex work =

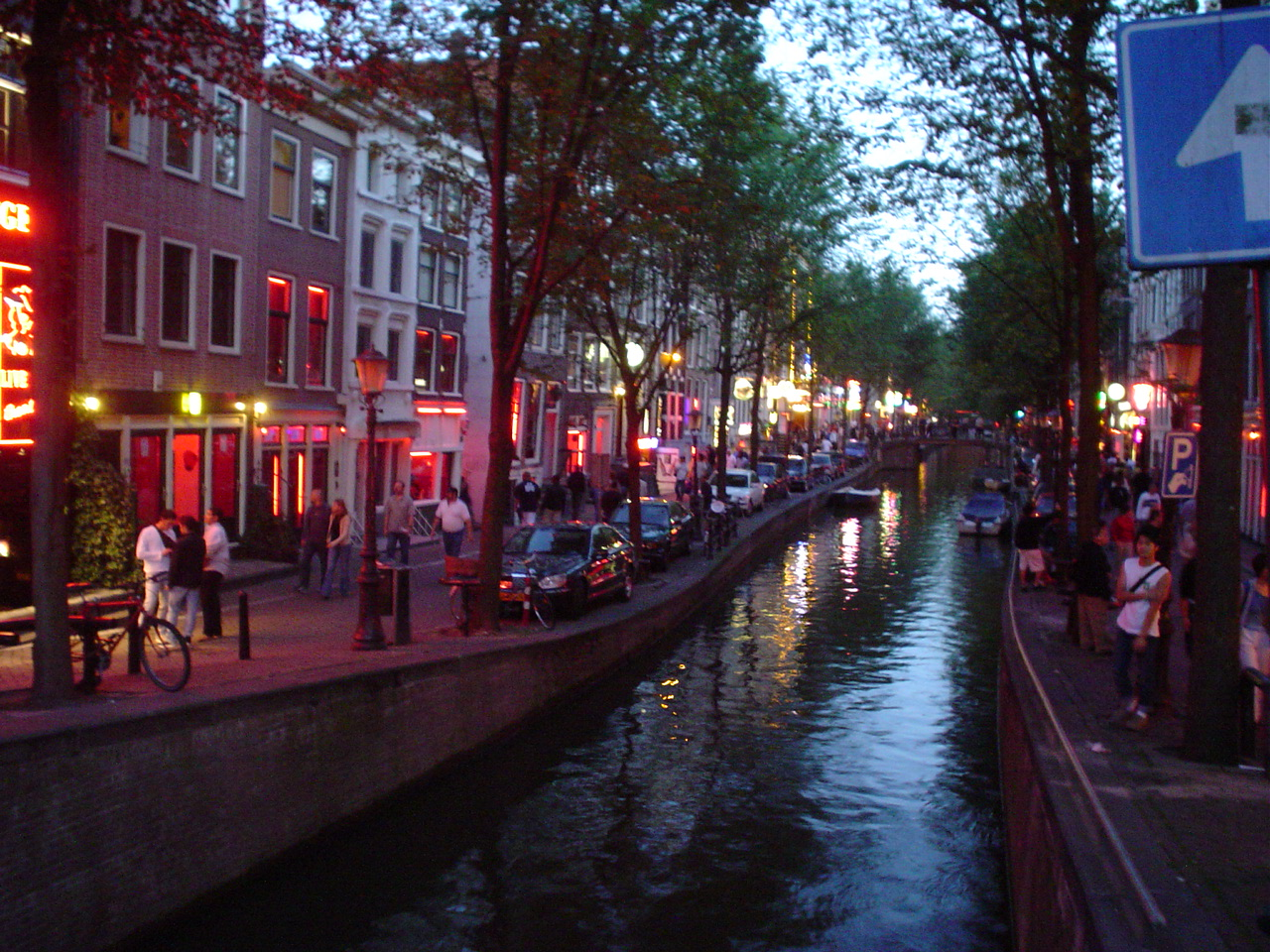
Amsterdam's red light district

Feminist views on sex work vary widely, depending on the type of feminism being applied. The sex industry is defined as the system of supply and demand which is generated by the existence of sex work as a commodity. The sex industry can further be segregated into the direct sex industry, which mainly applies to prostitution, and the indirect sex industry, which applies to sexual businesses which provide services such as lap dancing. The final component of the sex industry lies in the production and selling of pornography. With the distinctions between feminist perspectives, there are many documented instances from feminist authors of both explicit and implied feminist standpoints that provide coverage on the sex industry in regards to both "autonomous" and "non-autonomous" sex trades. The quotations are added since some feminist ideologies believe the commodification of women's bodies is never autonomous and therefore subversive or misleading by terminology.

There exists a diversity of feminist views on prostitution. Many of these positions can be loosely arranged into an overarching standpoint that is generally either critical or supportive of prostitution and sex work. The discourse surrounding prostitution is often discussed assuming sex workers are women, but those in the field of sex work and prostitution are not always women.

Anti-prostitution feminists hold that prostitution is a form of exploitation of women and of male dominance over women, and the result of the existing patriarchal societal order. These feminists argue that prostitution has a very negative effect, both on the prostitutes themselves and on society as a whole, as it reinforces stereotypical views about women, who are seen as sex objects to be used and abused by men.

Pro-prostitution feminists hold that prostitution and other forms of sex work can be valid choices for women and men who choose to engage in it. In this view, prostitution must be differentiated from forced prostitution, and feminists should support sex worker activism against abuses by both the sex industry and the legal system.

The disagreement between these two feminist stances has proven particularly contentious, and may be comparable to the feminist sex wars (acrimonious debates on sex issues) of the late twentieth century.

== Framing the debate ==
Newman and White in Women Power and Public Policy (2012) argue that feminist perspectives on prostitution agree on three main points: "First, they condemn the current legal policy enforcing criminal sanctions against women who offer sex in exchange for money. Second, they agree that authentic consent is the sine qua non of legitimate sex, whether in commercial or non-commercial form. Third, all feminists recognize that commercial sex workers are subject to economic coercion and are often victims of violence, and that little is done to address these problems."

They go on to identify three main feminist views on the issue of prostitution:

- The sex work perspective maintains that prostitution is a legitimate form of work for women faced with the option of other bad jobs, therefore women ought to have the right to work in the sex trade free of prosecution or the fear of it. It also argues that governments should eliminate laws that criminalize voluntary prostitution, which would allow prostitution to be regulated by governments and business codes, protect sex trade workers, and improve their ability to prosecute people who hurt them.
- The abolitionist perspective holds that governments should work towards the elimination of prostitution.
- The outlaw perspective views work in the sex trade as a "stepping stone to a better career or an expression of sexual freedom".

== Arguments against prostitution ==
Many feminists are strongly opposed to prostitution, as they see the practice as a form of violence against women, which should not be tolerated by society. Feminists who hold such views on prostitution include Kathleen Barry, Melissa Farley, Julie Bindel, Sheila Jeffreys, Catharine MacKinnon, Andrea Dworkin, and Laura Lederer. Their arguments against prostitution are explained and detailed below.

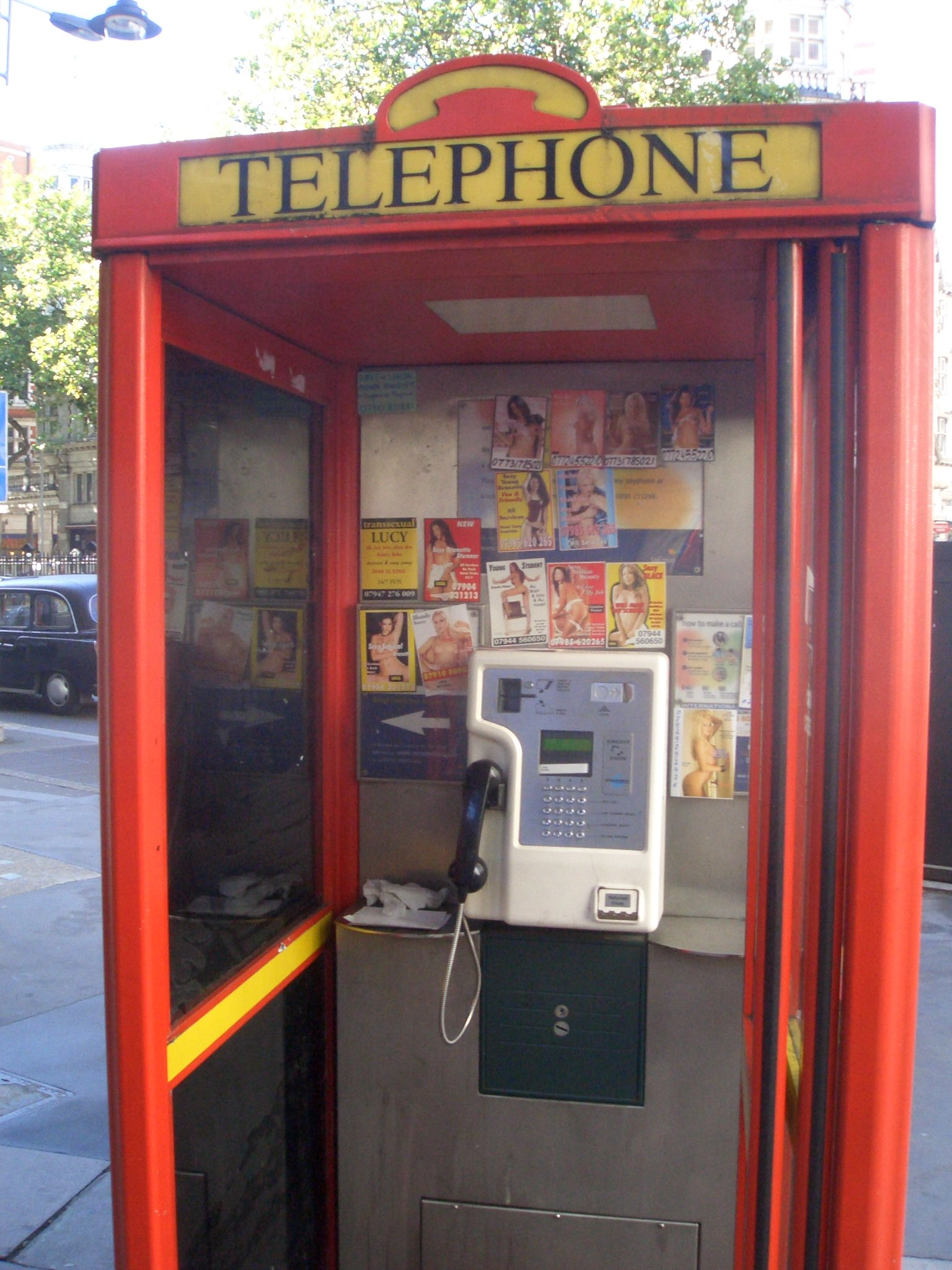
Advertisements for prostitutes fill a phone booth

=== Coercion and poverty ===
These feminists argue that, in most cases, prostitution is not a conscious and calculated choice. They say that most women who become prostitutes do so because they were forced or coerced by a pimp or by human trafficking, or, when it is an independent decision, generally is the result of extreme poverty and lack of opportunity, or of serious underlying problems, such as drug addiction, past trauma (such as child sexual abuse), and other unfortunate circumstances.

These feminists point out that women from the lowest socio-economic classes—impoverished women, women with a low level of education, and women from the most disadvantaged racial and ethnic minorities—are over-represented in prostitution all over the world; as stated by Catharine MacKinnon: "If prostitution is a free choice, why are the women with the fewest choices the ones most often found doing it?". A large percentage of prostitutes polled in one study of 475 people involved in prostitution reported that they were in a difficult period of their lives and most wanted to leave the occupation. MacKinnon argues that "in prostitution, women have sex with men they would never otherwise have sex with. The money thus acts as a form of force, not as a measure of consent. It acts like physical force does in rape."

Some anti-prostitution scholars hold that true consent in prostitution is not possible. Barbara Sullivan says: "In the academic literature on prostitution, there are very few authors who argue that valid consent to prostitution is possible. Most suggest that consent to prostitution is impossible, or at least unlikely." "[...] most authors suggest that consent to prostitution is deeply problematic, if not impossible [...] most authors have argued that consent to prostitution is impossible. For radical feminists, this is because prostitution is always a coercive sexual practice. Others simply suggest that economic coercion makes the sexual consent of sex workers highly problematic, if not impossible...".

Finally, abolitionists believe no person can be said to truly consent to their own oppression, and no people should have the right to consent to the oppression of others. In the words of Kathleen Barry, consent is not a "good divining rod as to the existence of oppression, and consent to violation is a fact of oppression. Oppression cannot effectively be gauged according to the degree of 'consent', since even in slavery, there was some consent, if consent is defined as inability to see any alternative."

=== Long-term effects on the prostitutes ===
Anti-prostitution feminists argue that prostitution is a practice which leads to serious negative long-term effects for the prostitutes, such as trauma; stress; depression; anxiety; self-medication through alcohol and drug use; eating disorders; and a greater risk for self-harm and suicide, because prostitution is an exploitative practice, which involves a woman who has sex with customers to whom she is not attracted, and routinely exposes the women to psychological, physical and sexual violence.

Andrea Dworkin stated her opinions as: "Prostitution in and of itself is an abuse of a woman's body. Those of us who say this are accused of being simple-minded. But prostitution is very simple. [...] In prostitution, no woman stays whole. It is impossible to use a human body in the way women's bodies are used in prostitution and to have a whole human being at the end of it, or in the middle of it, or close to the beginning of it. It's impossible. And no woman gets whole again later, after."

=== Male dominance over women ===
Anti-prostitution feminists are extremely critical of sex-positive perspectives, wherein prostitution by choice is said to be part of the sexual liberation of women, that it can be empowering for women, etc. Some feminists who oppose prostitution agree that sexual liberation for women outside of prostitution is important in the fight for gender equality, but they say it is crucial that society does not replace one patriarchal view on female sexuality – e.g., that women should not have sex outside marriage/a relationship and that casual sex is shameful for a woman, etc. – with another similarly oppressive and patriarchal view – acceptance of prostitution, a sexual practice which is based on a highly patriarchal construct of sexuality: that the sexual pleasure of a woman is irrelevant, that her only role during sex is to submit to the man's sexual demands and to do what he tells her, that sex should be controlled by the man and that the woman's response and satisfaction are irrelevant. These feminists argue that sexual liberation for women cannot be achieved as long as unequal sexual practices where a man dominates a woman are normalized.

Such feminists see prostitution as a form of male dominance over women, as the client has sex with a woman who does not enjoy it and who may be making a tremendous psychological effort to mentally dissociate herself from the client. They say that the act of prostitution is not a mutual and equal sex act as it puts the woman in a subordinate position, reducing her to a mere instrument of sexual pleasure for the client. These feminists believe that many clients use the services of prostitutes because they enjoy the "power trip" they derive from the act and the control they have over the woman during the sexual activity. Catharine MacKinnon argues that prostitution "isn't sex only, it's you do what I say, sex."

Prostitution is seen by these feminists as the result of a patriarchal societal order which subordinates women to men and where the inequality between genders is present in all aspects of life. These feminists believe that prostitution is very harmful to society as it reinforces the idea that women are sex objects which exist for men's enjoyment, which can be "bought" and which can be "used" solely for men's sexual gratification. Anti-prostitution feminists argue that when a society accepts prostitution it sends the message that it is irrelevant how the woman feels during sex or what the consequences of sex will be for her, and that it is acceptable for a man to engage in sexual activity with a woman who does not enjoy it and who could be mentally and emotionally forcing herself to be able to cope; the normalization of such one sided sexual encounters might negatively affect the way men relate to women in general and might increase sexual violence against women.

These feminists see prostitution as a form of slavery, and say that, far from decreasing rape rates, prostitution leads to a sharp increase in sexual violence against women, by sending the message that it is acceptable for a man to treat a woman as a sexual instrument over which he has total control. Melissa Farley argues that Nevada's high rape rate is connected to legal prostitution because Nevada is the only US state which allows legal brothels and is ranked 4th out of the 50 U.S. states for sexual assault crimes, saying, "Nevada's rape rate is higher than the U.S. average and way higher than the rape rate in California, New York and New Jersey. Why is this? Legal prostitution creates an atmosphere in this state in which women are not humans equal to them, are disrespected by men, and which then sets the stage of increased violence against women."

=== A consequence and correlate of violence against women ===
Some feminists, including many who identify as supporting the abolition of prostitution, see the selling of sex as a potential after effect of violence against women. Those who support this position cite studies of violence experienced by women in prostitution prior to entering prostitution. Most (60% to 70%) were sexually abused as children, 65% have been raped, most of them before the age of 15, and many young women and girls enter prostitution directly from state care, at least in England, Norway, Australia and Canada.

Prostitution abolitionists also object to the high rates of violence against women in the sex industry. Studies of women in prostitution show an extremely high level of violence is perpetrated against them. Figures vary across studies. One representative study showed 82% of respondents had been physically assaulted since entering prostitution, 55% of those by clients. Additionally, 80% had been physically threatened while in prostitution, 83% of those with a weapon. 8% reported physical attacks by pimps and clients of a nature that resulted in serious injury, for example gunshot wounds and knife wounds. 68% reported having been raped since entering prostitution, 48% more than five times and 46% reporting rapes committed by clients. Finally, 49% reported pornography was made of them while they were in prostitution and 32% had been upset by an attempt to make them do what clients had seen in pornography.

Beyond the individual instances of violence or the history of violence suffered by most women in prostitution, prostitution abolitionists see prostitution itself as a form of male violence against women and children.

Prostitution abolitionists also cite similarities between prostitution and violence against women. Farley, Lynne and Cotton (2005) argue the prostitution is most like battery because it similarly involves a pattern of coercive and controlling behaviour (by pimps, procurers, and traffickers as well as clients) that results in the control of the women in prostitution. Research conducted by Giobbe (1993) found similarities in the behaviour of pimps and batterers, in particular, through their use of enforced social isolation, threats, intimidation, verbal and sexual abuse, attitudes of ownership, and extreme physical violence. Some prostitutes argue prostitution has similarities to rape because it is a form of sexuality that is entirely controlled by the client, as rape is a form of sexuality in which the rapist controls the interaction, disregarding the desires, physical well-being or emotional pain of the victim.

=== The raced and classed nature of prostitution ===
Prostitution abolitionists often look at the factors of class and race when forming their arguments against prostitution to assess the power held by the client That is, they see prostitution as compelled by multiple forms of oppressive social power, not just sexism against women. Some analysts on human rights issues surrounding prostitution, such as Sigma Huda in her report for the United Nations Commission on Human Rights, also adopt this approach:

The act of prostitution by definition joins together two forms of social power (sex and money) in one interaction. In both realms (sexuality and economics), men hold substantial and systematic power over women. In prostitution, these power disparities merge in an act which both assigns and re-affirms the dominant social status of men over the subordinated social status of women. The demand for commercial sex is often further grounded in social power disparities of race, nationality, caste and colour.

Abolitionists attribute prostitution to women's comparative lack of economic resources. Globalization and neoliberalism have exacerbated already unequal economic relations, including by cutting back social spending in Northern and formerly socialist countries, and increasing the demand for cheap labour, including in prostitution, in both Southern and Northern countries. Combined with sex discrimination in wages and job type, sexual harassment in the workplace, and an undue burden of caring for children, the elderly and the ill, women are at a significant economic disadvantage in the current economic structure. Poverty is the single greatest "push" factor making women vulnerable to accepting prostitution as a means of subsistence.

In addition, racism shapes women's entry into prostitution, both because it makes women more vulnerable to prostitution and because clients demand racialized women in prostitution. Racism in education, economic and political systems affect the choices of women of colour. Additionally, racist sexualization, through pornography in particular, of Black and Asian women as over-sexed and submissive or otherwise available for prostitution contributes to the demand for specifically racialized women. Massage parlours, strip clubs, and other prostitution businesses are often located in poor and racialized neighbourhoods, encouraging clients to troll those neighbourhoods for women, making all women in those neighbourhoods vulnerable to prostitution-related harassment and women in those neighbourhoods more likely to accept their use in prostitution as normal.

Indigenous women around the world are particularly targeted for prostitution. In Canada, New Zealand, Mexico, and Taiwan, studies have shown that indigenous women are at the bottom of the race and class hierarchy of prostitution, often subjected to the worst conditions, most violent demands and sold at the lowest price. It is common for indigenous women to be over-represented in prostitution when compared with their total population. This is as a result of the combined forces of colonialism, physical displacement from ancestral lands, destruction of indigenous social and cultural order, misogyny, globalization/neoliberalism, race discrimination, and extremely high levels of violence perpetrated against them. The Aboriginal Women's Action Network, an abolitionist organization in Canada, has specifically noted that because the prostitution of Aboriginal women results from and reinforces such extreme hatred of Aboriginal women, no regime of legalization (which will expand the industry and entrap more women) can be safer for Aboriginal women. Prostitution can only further harm Aboriginal women.

=== Outlawing of buying sexual services ===
In 1999, Sweden became the first country to make it illegal to pay for sex, but not to be a prostitute (the client commits a crime, but not the prostitute). Similar laws were passed in Norway (in 2009) and in Iceland (in 2009). In February 2014, the members of the European Parliament voted, in a non-binding resolution (adopted by 343 votes to 139; with 105 abstentions), in favor of the "Swedish Model" of criminalizing the buying, but not the selling, of sex. In 2014, the Council of Europe has made a similar recommendation, stating that "While each system presents advantages and disadvantages, policies prohibiting the purchase of sexual services are those that are more likely to have a positive impact on reducing trafficking in human beings".

During 2011, the newly elected government of Denmark began discussing the possibility of banning the buying of sexual services. while during 2009, there was lobbying taking place for such a law in Hungary.

These laws are a natural extension of the views of the feminists who oppose prostitution. These feminists reject the idea that prostitution can be reformed, and oppose any harm reduction approach. Trisha Baptie, a Canadian former prostitute, who now opposes the industry, and lobbies for the outlawing of buying sexual services, wrote: "Harm reduction? You can't make prostitution "safer"; prostitution is violence in itself. It is rape, the money only appeases men's guilt," "One of the most "sex-positive" things you can do is make sure men cannot buy sex, because the buying of sex is violence against women and is a direct deterrent to women's equality."

These feminists see prostitution as a form of violence against women, and vehemently condemn the common pro-legalization argument that "prostitution has always existed, and will never go away", arguing that other violent acts such as murder, rape, and child sexual abuse have also always existed, and will never be eradicated either, and that is not a reason to legalize them. These feminists argue that the idea of legalizing prostitution to control it and "make it a little better", and reduce harm, is no different from the idea of legalizing domestic violence to control it and "make it a little better", and reduce harm.

== Feminist responses to sex work ==
=== Radical feminism ===
Radical feminism views prostitution, and by extension the sex industry, as the ideal demonstration of women being subordinated and subjected to violence through the patriarchy's market demands. The notable radical feminist Andrea Dworkin argues that the sexual subordination of women must be overcome for gender equality to be achieved. The sex industry, which renders the woman's body a commodity, is therefore incompatible with radical feminism. Some radical feminists argue that the sex industry, by breaking down the barrier between sexual activity against commercialization and production, degrades the sexual autonomy women socially hold. The lack of autonomy in the sex industry stems from the inhumane treatment sex workers often face, the social and economic power discrepancy between the consumers and providers of sexual services and content, and the perpetuation of the subordination of women through the sex industry's high demand. This falls in line with the view radical feminists hold about capitalist societies as containing a 'moral' economy, in which the economically permitted actions embodies societal beliefs about individual autonomy. Within the framework of moral appeals, the sex industry meets its unambiguous and nondiscretionary fulfillment of its obligations to consumers at the expense of female sexual autonomy.

=== Liberal feminism ===
Liberal feminism views a capitalist democracy as capable and inclined to enacting laws which protect individual rights as it pertains to gender discrimination, and this includes protecting women who work within the sex industry. As the feminist author Martha Nussbaum argues, the reason that the sex industry sees such high instances of undermined female autonomy and sexual wellness is due to the social stigmatization which is rooted in the fear of female sexual expression, and that the services of the sex industry should be respected as any other form of labor. Nussbaum's argument concludes that the stigmatization of the sex industry only directly negatively impacts sex workers without addressing the underlying social oppression towards women. There is disagreement between liberal feminists as to whether or not sex work is degrading to women, but it is generally agreed upon that legalizing the sex industry would be positive, as it would grant women who work within the sex industry greater protections under the legal system. This would come in the form of granting women safer spaces to work, and allow the government to limit and regulate unsafe, exploitative practices against sex workers. The legalization of sex work also grants sex workers the autonomy to decide what they wish to do with their bodies, which is a tenant of liberal feminism.

=== Dominance feminism ===
Dominance feminism views the political, social, and economic structure of the world are discriminatory against women on account of the concerted efforts of the patriarchy, and therefore the discrimination against women in the sex industry manifests as a byproduct of male domination. As the dominance feminist author Catharine A. MacKinnon holds, the sex industry cannot be viewed as feminist on account of men's sexual domination over women being the main factor upon which the industry functions. Prostitution and the sex industry is viewed more broadly as a state which all women are involuntarily entered into due to a woman's sexuality being the object through which men can barter and legislate over. Due to the nature of the sex industry as primarily selling female produced content or female bodies, which are often sold to men as clients through male brokers, prostitution and pornography are the highest forms of women's exploitation. Dominance feminists might also view prostitution as inherently negative due to the belief that women's self-expression through sexuality cannot ever be sold without the patron's perception of the commodity as being discriminatory against female autonomy.

== Pro-sex work perspectives ==
To directly counteract the view of prostitution as the oppression of women, some scholars and feminists have voiced their opinion in support of prostitution and other forms of sex-work. Support is based on ideas of economic empowerment, independence and autonomy of choice, comparisons to sexual role in marriage, and challenging outdated societal notions of the proper expression of women's sexuality.

In July 2024, the United Nations (UN) Working Group on Discrimination Against Women and Girls published a paper called, "Eliminating discrimination against sex workers and securing their human rights". The paper advocates for the full decriminalization of sex work and has been backed by the Sex Workers Inclusive Feminist Alliance (SWIFA).

=== Proponents and support groups ===
Activists and scholars who are proponents of the pro-sex work position include: Margo St. James, Norma Jean Almodovar, Kamala Kempadoo, Laura María Agustín, Annie Sprinkle, Carol Leigh (also known as Scarlot Harlot), Carol Queen, Amin Yacoub, and Audacia Ray.

To assist women not involved in traditional "woman's work", pro-sex work formed to create a helpful environment for sex workers. Social activist groups like The Red Thread, founded in 1985, seek to educate the public, provide legal and medical assistance to sex workers, and help organize sex workers into groups to better protect themselves and to become advocates. Liberal feminists and groups such as The Red Thread, The International Committee for Prostitutes (ICPR) and COYOTE seek to ensure that sex work is seen as a valid choice that women may make without overtly oppressive forces.

=== Economic empowerment ===
One view is that sex work not only empowers women, but it provides women with greater opportunities for financial advancement. There are liberal and radical feminist proponents of female empowerment through sex work. Liberal feminists view prostitution as the sale of sex solely for economic gain, and thus it cannot be differentiated from any other sale of goods. The selling of sex ultimately consists of a buyer and a seller trying to negotiate for the best deal. Interfering in this sale of goods could not only be interfering with the rights of the buyer, but also of the seller. Women who have chosen to enter the field should not be looked down upon and should not have their choice considered to be lesser than another type of socially accepted employment. Liberal feminists argue that while prostitution and sex work may not be the ideal job for many women, it can provide a way of life and prosperity that would be otherwise unattainable. Sex work can be seen as a better alternative to working for minimum wage or working in a field that that society decided is "woman's work".

=== Marriage analogy ===
Sex work and prostitution have historically been compared to marriage. In a society where women have fewer perspectives of paid employment, they exchange reproductive work for maintenance.

=== Legalization or decriminalization ===
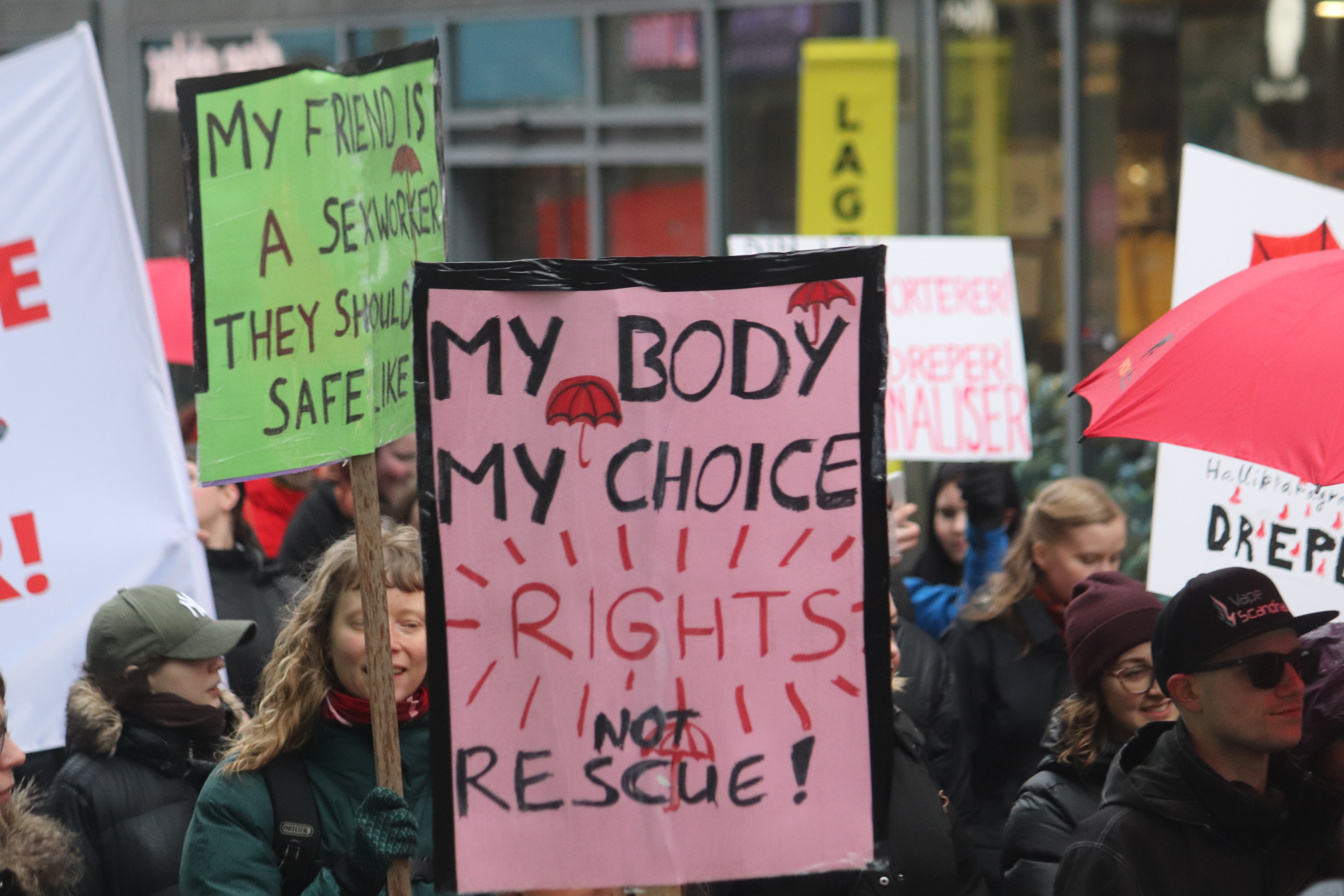
People campaigning for sex workers' rights

Feminists who support the legalization or decriminalization of prostitution argue that one of the significant flaws with the radical anti-prostitution feminist view is that a majority of its arguments are premised on the assumption that prostitution itself is inherently laced with sexism, classism and other unbalanced power relations. The institution of prostitution itself is seen by abolitionists as resting on these conditions and therefore they believe legalization or decriminalization will only lead to the reinforcement of these conditions. Pro-sex-work feminists argue that this assumption is flawed, and that while prostitution, as it currently exists in our society, can be misogynist or degrading in some manifestations, there is a grave danger in attributing these conditions to prostitution itself. They argue that targeting prostitution as a whole unduly focuses attention on this single institution in our society, rather than looking at society at large and the social institutions, laws and practices that lead to the subordination and oppression of women. There has been much debate over the last few decades amongst feminists about how laws relating to prostitution should be reformed. Most liberal feminists who look at prostitution from a capitalist perspective support some form of either decriminalization or legalization.

Decriminalization is the removal of all penalties for prostitution itself and for all the activities necessary for prostitutes to do their work, such as advertising, communicating with clients, etc. It does not mean the reversal of all laws relating to prostitution, for example, laws that exist against forcing someone into prostitution. For the purposes of decriminalization, Feminists for Free Expression defines the word "prostitution" to mean any consensual sexual activity between adults where compensation is involved; nonconsensual sex acts or sex acts perpetrated against minors are not prostitution, in their view. Instead they prefer the term "criminal sexual acts".

The term 'legalization', on the other hand, is usually used in the context of prostitution to refer to the use of criminal laws to regulate prostitution by determining the legal conditions under which prostitutes can operate. Legalization can mean anything from rigid controls under a state-controlled system to merely defining the operation of a privatized sex industry. Legalization is often accompanied by strict criminal penalties for anyone who operates outside the legally defined framework. With legalization there may be rules about where prostitution can take place (for example only in state licensed brothels), what prostitutes can do, mandatory registry/licensing and frequent mandatory health exams.

Some pro-sex-worker feminists support decriminalization and some support legalization, for different reasons. Proponents of decriminalization believe that all people, including sex workers, are entitled to the same rights regarding safety, health and human rights, and that outdated criminal laws need to be reformed to improve the living and working conditions of sex workers. They argue that decriminalization is better for the workers than legalization and that both criminalization and heavily regulated legalization infringe on the workers' safety and human rights. Many feminists who support sex workers favor decriminalization because it allows prostitutes to go into business for themselves and self-determination is a tenet of feminist politics. They believe decriminalization fosters responsibility, empowerment, self-esteem and self-care, all important feminist values. The goal in decriminalizing sex work is that anyone doing any type of sex work would be treated the same way, with the same rights and responsibilities, as any other self-employed person. Whether they support decriminalization or some form of legalization, pro-sex work feminists believe that the current laws that exist surrounding prostitution in many countries need to be changed and are harmful to the people who work in the industry.

=== Transgender, non-binary, and male sex workers ===
Pro-sex work advocates also point out that many men and non-binary individuals also willingly engage in sex work for a variety of reasons. Gay and bisexual men, for example, often view sex work as a profitable extension of their normal sex lives, sometimes using sex work to supplement their regular incomes. These sex workers argue that anti-sex work advocates harm them by passing anti-sex work laws and reducing state-run social services.

When discussing prostitution and theorizing about prostitution, sex workers are often assumed to be cisgender women. In the writings of abolitionist feminists like Catharine MacKinnon, the language used is in reference to women who are prostitutes, as she writes "Not only is prostitution overwhelmingly done to women by men, but every aspect of the condition has defined gender female as such and as inferior for centuries". Foundational feminist texts covering prostitution also cite prostitution as being created on the basis of the exploitation of women, for example being described as "at its core a manifestation of male violence against women".

There is not much research on non-cisgender women sex workers, and more recent gender scholars have theorized about transgender and non-binary individuals who have performed sex work/labor. These theorists have found that, in regards to gender diversity in feminist literature, that "all trans sex workers are women, and all male sex workers are assumed to be cisgender". As a whole, abolitionists feminists who are against prostitution do not comment on sex workers who are not cisgender women, while those who are in favor of the legalization of sex work also rarely address transgender sex workers and see those who are transgender and gender non-binary as a "special interest" group rather than part of the discourse surrounding prostitution.

== Other perspectives ==
There are many feminists whose views on prostitution do not fit in either the anti-prostitution feminist or the sex-positive feminist viewpoints, and in some cases are critical of both. These feminist authors have criticized what they see as the unproductive and often bitter debate that characterizes the two-position analysis of prostitution. Such authors highlight that in allowing arguments about prostitution to be reduced to a stale analysis and theoretical debate, feminists are themselves contributing to the marginalization of prostitutes, simplifying the nature of the work they carry out and the personal circumstances that involve each individual.

Feminist scholar Laurie Shrage has also criticized the haphazard nature of feminist views on prostitution. Shrage claims that in a determination to undermine patriarchy, pro-sex feminists have advocated a reckless and "Milton Friedman style" deregulation of laws surrounding prostitution, without considering the implications that this may have upon women involved in sex work, particularly given the nature of the sex trade, which is more likely to be plagued by exploitation and poor working conditions, concerns that must be of importance to any feminist.

== Sex industry across the world ==
=== Africa ===
A large number of women and children are trafficked from Africa to other parts of the world. Many of the women are trafficked to work as prostitutes. It has been suggested that the scale of the trafficking may be in part due to many Africans having no birth registration and hence no official nationality, making them easier to transport across borders. It is also argued that the significant negative economic impact on Africa resulting from this trafficking combines with the continent's existing high levels of poverty and low educational attainment to further expand the supply for human traffickers.

=== Netherlands: Amsterdam ===
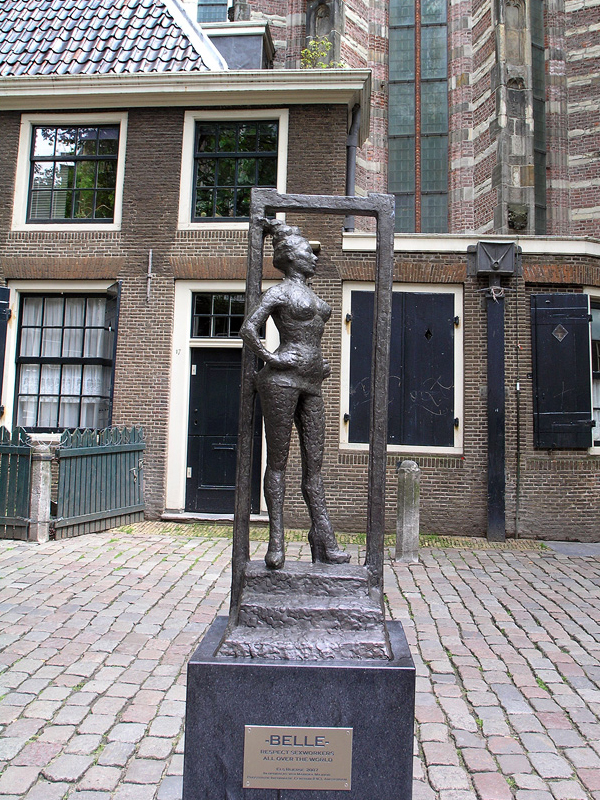
Statue to honor the sex workers of the world. Installed March 2007 in Amsterdam, Oudekerksplein, in front of the Oude Kerk, in Amsterdam's red-light district De Wallen. Title is Belle, inscription says "Respect sex workers all over the world".

The notable neighborhood of De Wallen in Amsterdam is home to the Netherlands' legalized red-light district, which is a commercial hub for the sex industry. Through the legalization and regulation of the sex industry, the Dutch government has been capable of cutting back on organized crime within the red-light district without encroaching on the rights of sex workers, who are still protected by the law. Although the intentions are politically well meaning, most projections for the decriminalization projects of the region are projected to displace and therefore endanger sex workers, which seems to prove the point liberal feminists make about stigmatization on a governmental level as endangering to prostitutes.

=== Thailand ===
In 1997, Thailand had an estimated two hundred thousand women and children that were involved in prostitution. An estimated 11 percent of the country's gross domestic income is from prostitution. This means that prostitution has become a necessary source of revenue. This contradiction in the country arises because they are stuck in between traditional and modern views because the amount of gross national income prostitution brings into the country.

=== New Zealand ===
The Prostitution Reform Act of 2003 (PRA) legalized sex work in New Zealand. In New Zealand sex workers have guaranteed rights in employment and human rights legislation. A review published by the Christchurch School of Medicine in November 2007 found that 90% of sex workers in New Zealand saw the PRA as giving them employment, legal and health and safety rights, 64% found it easier to refuse clients and 57% said police attitudes towards sex workers had improved.

== See also ==
- Choice feminism
- Decriminalization of sex work
- Individualist feminism
- Prostitution law
- Revolting Prostitutes
- Sex-positive feminism
- Sex workers' rights
- A Vindication of the Rights of Whores
- Feminist views on pornography
- Transactional sex
