= Lila Milikj =

North Macedonian transgender activist (born 1984)

- Лила Милиќ
- Born: 1984 (age 41–42); Skopje, SR Macedonia, Yugoslavia
- Citizenship: North Macedonia
- Occupations: Human rights activist Sex worker
- Years active: 2009–present
- Organization(s): European Sex Workers' Rights Alliance; TransFormA
- Known for: Advocacy for sex workers and LGBTQ people in the Balkans

Lila Milikj (Macedonian: Лила Милиќ; born 1984) is a Macedonian human rights activist. A trans woman and former sex worker, she first became known for her advocacy and support of sex workers operating in the Balkans. Milikj later founded TransFormA, the first transgender rights organisation established in North Macedonia.

== Biography ==
Milikj was born in 1984 in Skopje in what was then the Socialist Republic of Macedonia within Yugoslavia. After coming out as transgender, Milikj worked for a period as a sex worker; she reported at the age of 24 being sexually and mentally assaulted. This led to her becoming an activist for the rights of sex workers from 2009, ultimately going on to serve on the board of directors of the European Sex Workers' Rights Alliance, as well as acting as its treasurer as of 2026. Milikj has called for there to be a greater understanding of sex workers' health needs by medical professionals, citing the example of a fellow sex worker who was unwell and received inadequate medical treatment due to doctors' focus on testing her for sexually transmitted diseases and not considering any other cause of her symptoms; Milikj has said that such "stigma and discrimination" in healthcare settings led to sex workers being reluctant to access medical treatment.

In 2017, Milikj came out publicly as transgender and began advocating for transgender rights. In 2018, she co-founded TransFormA (ТрансФормА), described as the first transgender rights organisation in North Macedonia, stemming from a support group first established in 2011. Through TransFormA, Milikj has advocated for public recognition of changes in gender identity, as well as equal access to rights, justice, services, and equal opportunities. TransFormA also published North Macedonia's first magazine for the transgender community, Transin.

Milikj has called for North Macedonia to pass legislation formally recognising changes in gender, describing transgender people as "last class citizens" due to the barriers they had in accessing services; she herself was accused of having false documents due to her name and gender on her birth certificate being different to her identity documents, despite having permission from the Ministry of the Interior to go by her chosen name.

In 2018, Milkj was the first transgender model featured at Fashion Weekend in Skopje, during the show of Irina Tosheva. In 2019, she appeared in the music video for the song "Proud" by Tamara Todevska, which represented North Macedonia at the 2019 Eurovision Song Contest.

In 2019, Milikj organised North Macedonia's first Transgender Visibility March, where around 30 individuals marched through Skopje, ending at the Registry Office, on 29 March. She has since co-ordinated multiple editions of Skopje Pride.

On 17 May 2023, Milikj spoke before the Assembly of North Macedonia to mark International Day Against Homophobia, Biphobia and Transphobia. In April 2024, she was due to talk at a conference at Ss. Cyril and Methodius University of Skopje's medical school about transgender healthcare, but the lecture was cancelled following protests by the Coalition for the Protection of Children.

Milikj featured in the 2023 short film Are You a Man directed by Gjorce Stavreski. The film screened at the Motovun Film Festival, the Tirana International Film Festival and the Thessaloniki International Film Festival.

== Recognition ==
In 2021, Milikj featured in the European Union Delegation in North Macedonia's You Look Beautiful Today, an exhibition at the East Gate Mall featuring 13 portraits of Macedonians from different facets of society. The photographs were taken by Tatjana Rantasha and Zoran Kardula and was displayed between December 2021 and January 2022. Milikj was featured in Some Girls, a photo exhibition documenting transgender women, by Macedonian photographer Lepa Georgievska. Milikj was also featured in Trans Balkan, a photo exhibition documenting transgender women in the Balkans, by Aleksandar Tsronogorats.

In 2024, Milikj received the Meto Jovanovski Human Rights Award, alongside the Centre for Civil Communication, from the Ministry of Culture. She was the first transgender person to receive the award, from the Parliament of North Macedonia.
