= The Red Thread (De Rode Draad) =

Support group for prostitutes in Netherlands

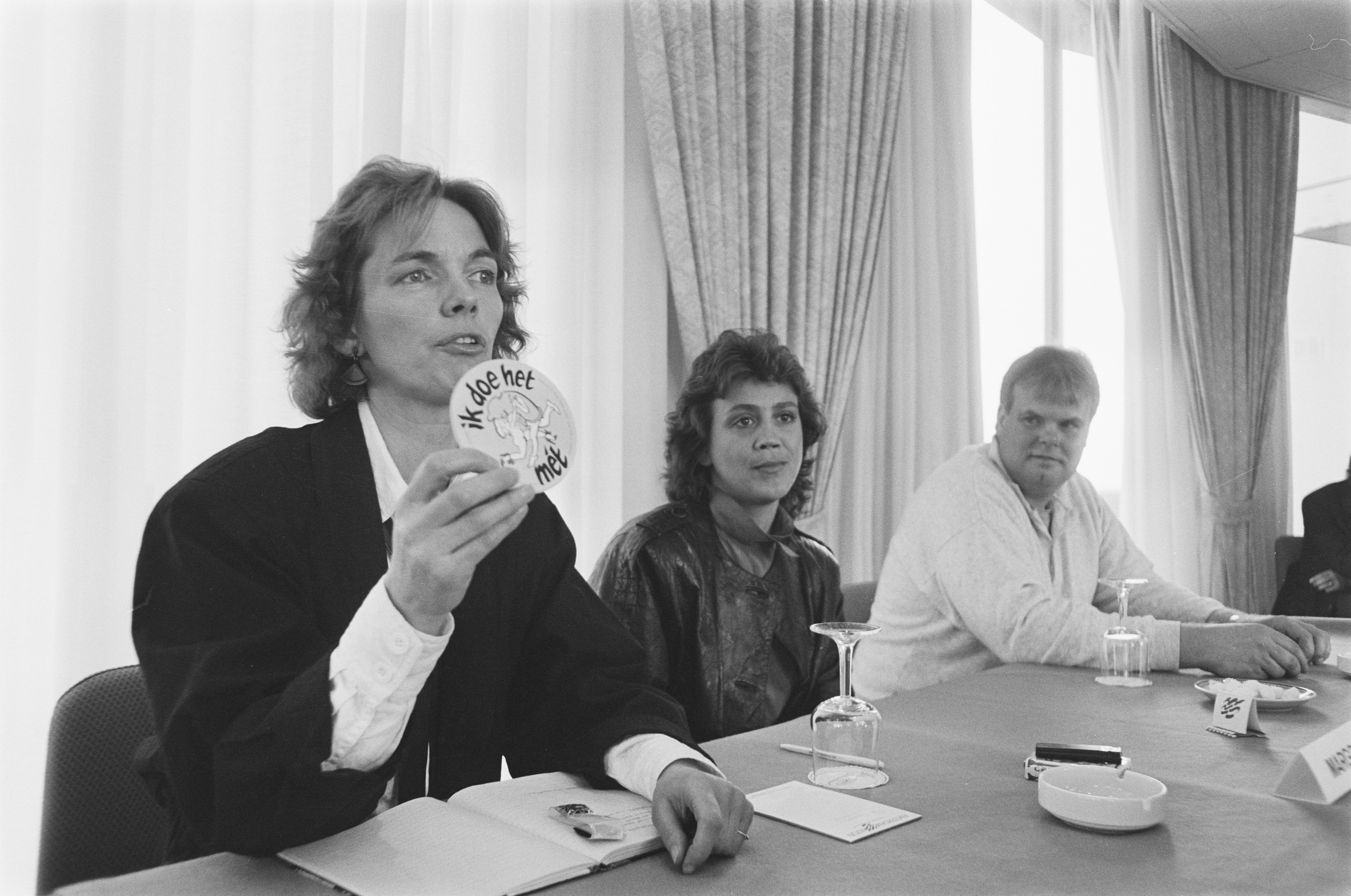
Promotion of condom usage by De Rode Draad (1987)

The Red Thread (De Rode Draad in Dutch) was an advocacy-support group for prostitutes in the Netherlands. It was formed in 1985, and declared bankrupt in 2012. The name The Red Thread (De Rode Draad) was inspired by Nathaniel Hawthorne's novel The Scarlet Letter, in which a "sinful" woman has to put a red letter "A" on her clothing.

== Vision on prostitution ==
The organization regarded prostitution as an acceptable form of work. The organization's goal was to strive for emancipation and the improvement of the position of prostitutes. The nature of the aid to prostitutes that followed from this, focused on essentially different aspects than that of Scarlet Cord, which aims precisely to help women who want to step out of prostitution.

Important points of attention for De Rode Draad were denouncing exploitation, and combating the social stigma that surrounds prostitution. The women from the talk group found that the work of prostitutes wasn't taken seriously enough by the police, health care and politician. Prostitution was not considered labor. The foundation wanted to strengthen the labor position of women and legalize the profession through regulation. While they did not self-identify as a feminist group, they sympathized with sex-positive feminism.

== Goals ==
De Rode Draad also acted as an official interlocutor of the government, police and health care about safe sex, the ban on brothels, and trafficking in women. Furthermore, De Rode Draad was a recognized consultation partner for the sex club owners and window-owners. In addition to its legal goals, the foundation also had other objectives: to strengthen the position of the prostitute and to inform people about human trafficking, hygiene, safe sex and other health issues. For the government, De Rode Draad was a channel to increase knowledge about HIV/AIDS. The subsidy that was provided had to be used, among other things, to prevent HIV/AIDS.

Approximately 20,000 people in the Netherlands work in prostitution (window prostitution, clubs and escort agencies). Since the 1990s, only 10 percent of prostitutes in the Netherlands are Dutch. The other prostitutes come from Eastern Europe, Latin America, Africa and Asia. To also serve these newcomers, De Rode Draad provided information in various languages. In addition, employees of De Rode Draad visited brothels, sex clubs, window prostitutes and red-light districts to keep in touch with their target group.

== Activities ==
The roots of the De Rode Draad lay in an article in the magazine Viva of January 13, 1984 on the position of women in prostitution. As a result of this, a group of ex-prostitutes was formed. At the end of 1984 there was a founding meeting, and on January 17, 1985, the establishment, after a visit to a notary, was established. After two years of effort in 1987, De Rode Draad received a subsidy for the first time. For the foundation that was the first recognition of politics. In the early years, advocacy and service were intertwined. It was only in later years, also due to the lifting of the brothel ban, that De Rode Draad was actively working to expose abuses and to improve the working conditions of prostitutes. De Rode Draad also acted as a mouthpiece for prostitutes towards politics and media. From 1988, they published a magazine, Blacklight, written by and for prostitutes.

In the 1990s De Rode Draad provided courses for members, such as self-defense courses, specially tailored to conflicts in a small space, and information about taxes and pension provisions. To reinforce the vision of the foundation on prostitution, Rode Draad launched a campaign in 1995 Prostituée. Gewoon een beroep (Prostitute. Just a profession). In 1999, De Rode Draad started a sticker campaign to ensure that window prostitutes were better paid. According to the foundation, the prices in prostitution had fallen rather than risen over the last decades. In 2001, the foundation, together with FNV Bondgenoten, took the step to set up its own professional association, Vakwerk, for prostitutes. After the brothel ban in 2000 was lifted, it appeared that prostitutes often had to sign dubious work contracts, and in practice rarely had the same rights and obligations as other employees. Prostitutes could become anonymous members of the professional association. The association would exist independently for three years, and then it would be decided whether the association would join the FNV. By means of a complaint to the Equal Treatment Commission, the foundation also managed that prostitutes could open a business account with ING Bank.

De Rode Draad organized its annual congress in 2004, from 2005 it went downhill with the activities of the foundation. On January 1, 2005, the subsidy to De Rode Draad, 200,000 euros annually, was discontinued due to cutbacks in the government. The foundation could still qualify for a project subsidy of 100,000 euros. In later years, De Rode Draad was particularly concerned with visiting sex workers in the country to point out their rights and encourage them to address abuses. The foundation also ran a helpdesk for prostitutes. In 2007, the foundation also organized a publicity campaign at the Amsterdam Red Light District where people opposed the presence of pimps, and in 2008 conducted research into illegal prostitution in massage parlors. In the first half of 2009, De Rode Draad had to close its office due to a lack of subsidy and sponsorship funds. What remained was a website run by three volunteers.

== Under fire in 1993 ==
In 1993, the organization came under fire. Some of the supporters said they lacked confidence in the board, which would be "not capable, unqualified and undemocratic". They also demanded the removal of the foundation to make way for an association, which would lead to more participation of the members.

== Survival ==
Just before the 20th anniversary in January 2005, the foundation had to cut costs. The third Balkenende cabinet had decided to cut back on the subsidy to De Rode Draad. As a result, the foundation lost a subsidy of €200,000 per year. In addition to this 200,000 euros, the foundation also appealed to a project subsidy from the Ministry of Health, Welfare and Sport. This subsidy amounted to €100,000. Without the structural income, the five paid employees of the foundation could not be paid. In 2001, the continuation of the subsidy was already uncertain. Then a majority in the House of Representatives insisted on abandoning the cutbacks. Approximately 100 prostitutes also lost their membership in Crafts because the FNV saw no point in continuing their advocacy. The FNV found the sector too small to start a dedicated department. In 2009 the office was closed. The organization's website was still active.

== Bankruptcy ==
On 28 August 2012, the bankruptcy of De Rode Draad foundation was announced. Mr. MJ Tops from Fort Advocaten NV was appointed administrator. The foundation's office was closed on 29 August 2012.

== See also ==
- A Vindication of the Rights of Whores
- COYOTE
- International Committee for Prostitutes' Rights
- International Day to End Violence Against Sex Workers
- Margo St. James
- Prostitution in the Netherlands
- Sex worker
- Sex worker rights
- World Charter for Prostitutes' Rights
