= European Sex Workers' Rights Alliance =

Amsterdam-based European network of sex workers' rights organisations

European Sex Workers' Rights Alliance (ESWA)
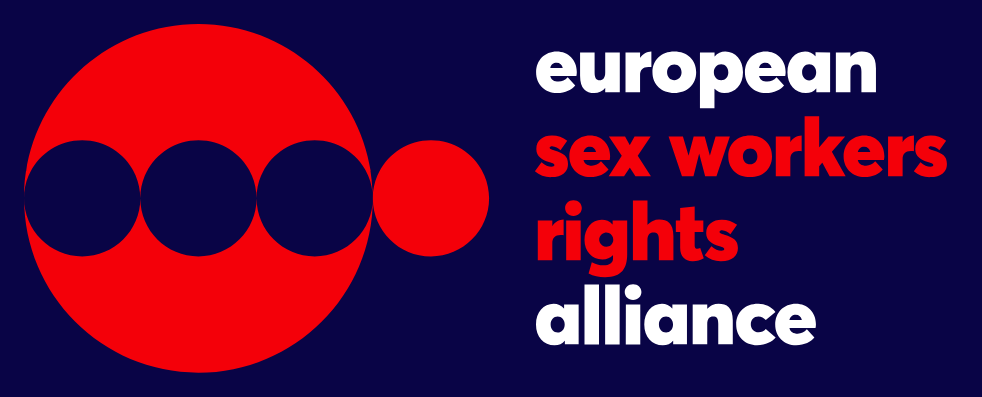
- Predecessor: International Committee for Prostitutes' Rights (ICPR)
- Founded: February 1985 (as ICPR); 2005 (relaunch as ICRSE)
- Type: Non-profit organisation
- Purpose: Sex workers' rights
- Location: Amsterdam, Netherlands
- Region served: Europe, Central Asia
- Board of directors: Lila Milikj
- Website: https://www.eswalliance.org/

The European Sex Workers' Rights Alliance (ESWA) is a sex worker-led network for sex workers' rights, representing more than 100 organisations led by or working with sex workers in 30 countries in Europe and Central Asia. It was originally formed as the International Committee for Prostitutes' Rights (ICPR) in 1985, and since its relaunch in 2005 known as the International Committee on the Rights of Sex Workers in Europe (ICRSE), registered as a nonprofit foundation in Amsterdam, Netherlands. The organisation adopted its current name ESWA in 2021.

== History ==
In the mid-1970s a highly politicised prostitutes' rights movement, later known as the sex workers' rights movement, emerged in Europe. It began with the strike by French prostitutes in 1975, which led to the creation of the French Collective of Prostitutes and in turn inspired the formation of groups such as the English Collective of Prostitutes in England (1975), the New York Prostitutes Collective (1979) which later became USPROS, the Australian Prostitutes Collective (1981) which is now known as the Prostitutes Collective of Victoria (PCV), and the Italian Committee for Civil Rights of Prostitutes (1982). The Canadian Organisation for the Rights of Prostitutes (CORP), the Dutch Red Thread and HYDRA in Germany also assumed significant roles in the movement. The International Committee for Prostitutes Rights was formed in 1985.

The ICPR adopted the World Charter for Prostitutes' Rights in 1985 in response to feminist arguments that all prostitution is forced prostitution. The Charter calls for the decriminalisation of "all aspects of adult prostitution resulting from individual decision". The Charter also states that prostitutes should be guaranteed "all human rights and civil liberties, including the freedom of speech, travel, immigration, work, marriage, and motherhood and the right to unemployment insurance, health insurance and housing". The Charter established a human rights-based approach, which has subsequently been further elaborated by the sex workers' rights movement.

The ICPR was relaunched as the International Committee for the Rights of Sex Workers in Europe (ICRSE) in Amsterdam in 2005. It drew up another charter of rights for sex workers, with a focus on European countries. When two sex workers, Dora in Turkey and Jasmine in Sweden, were simultaneously murdered in the summer of 2013, ICRSE and its member organisations held protests in 29 cities across the world to end violence against sex workers. In 2021, the organisation adopted its current name "European Sex Workers' Rights Alliance" (ESWA).

On 5 September 2023, the ESWA was part of a coalition of many sex workers' rights and human rights organisations (also including Human Rights Watch, Amnesty International, La Strada, ILGA-Europe and others) calling for the rejection of a European Parliament resolution on prostitution, which aimed at criminalisation of sex work in Europe. The resolution passed (234 votes in favour, 175 against and 122 abstentions) on 14 September 2023, but its most controversial parts were removed, including references advocating the Nordic model approach to prostitution, because sex workers from ESWA and its members, human rights defenders, and medical experts such as The Lancet have said the Nordic model actually increases violence and discrimination against sex workers, leaves them more excluded from society and more vulnerable to sexually transmitted infections such as HIV/AIDS. According to ESWA executive director Sabrina Sanchez, 'The vote demonstrates that despite the onslaught of anti-rights attacks on sex workers and other marginalised groups, Europe is increasingly in favour of rights-respecting solutions to violence against our communities.' ESWA director of programmes Luca Stevenson (himself a former sex worker) stated that the Nordic model is "extremely anti-feminist" and "ignores the capacities of women and other people to make decisions about their own life."

== See also ==
- A Vindication of the Rights of Whores
- COYOTE
- International Day to End Violence Against Sex Workers
- Margo St. James
- Mariska Majoor
- Sex worker rights
- Sex worker
- World Charter for Prostitutes' Rights

== Bibliography ==
- Ditmore, Melissa Hope (2006). Encyclopedia of Prostitution and Sex Work. Greenwood Publishing Group. p. 782. ISBN 0-313-32968-0.
- Gall, Gregor (2006). "Antecedents of Organising Sex Workers". Sex Worker Union Organising: An International Study. London: Palgrave Macmillan. pp. 46–64. doi:10.1057/9780230502482_4. ISBN 9780230502482.
- Kempadoo, Kamala; Doezema, Jo (1998). Global Sex Workers: Rights, Resistance, and Redefinition. Routledge. p. 294. ISBN 9780415918299.
- Rubio Grundell, Lucrecia (2022). Security Meets Gender Equality in the EU: The Politics of Trafficking in Women for Sexual Exploitation. Cham: Springer Nature. p. 246. ISBN 9783031122095.
- Saunders, Penelope (6 August 2000). "Fifteen Years after the World Charter for Prostitutes' Rights". Human Rights Dialogue (1994–2005). 2 (3). Carnegie Council.
- Wotton, Rachel (September 2016). "Sex workers who provide services to clients with disability in New South Wales, Australia" (PDF). ses.library.usyd.edu.au. University of Sydney.
