= Prostitution law =

Legality of prostitution

Legalization – prostitution legal and regulated Decriminalization – no criminal penalties for prostitution Abolitionism – prostitution is legal, but organizing sex is illegal while buying or selling sex is neither regulated nor prohibited Neo-abolitionism – illegal to buy or organize sex but legal to sell sex Prohibitionism – prostitution illegal Ambiguity/Legality varies depending on local laws Not available

Prostitution laws varies widely from country to country, and between jurisdictions within a country. At one extreme, prostitution or sex work is legal in some places and regarded as a profession, while at the other extreme, it is considered a severe crime punishable by death in some other places. A variety of different legal models exist around the world, including total bans, bans that only target the customer, and laws permitting prostitution but prohibiting organized groups, an example being brothels.

In many jurisdictions, prostitution – the commercial exchange of sex for money, goods, service, or some other benefit agreed upon by the transacting parties – is illegal, while in others it is legal, but surrounding activities, such as soliciting in a public place, operating a brothel, and pimping, may be illegal. In many jurisdictions where prostitution is legal, it is regulated; in others it is unregulated. Where the exchange of sex for money is criminalized, it may be the sex worker (most commonly), the client, or both, who are subject to prosecution.

Prostitution has been condemned as a single form of human rights abuse, and an attack on the dignity and worth of human beings. Other schools of thought argue that sex work is a legitimate occupation, whereby a person trades or exchanges sexual acts for money or goods. Some believe that women in developing countries are especially vulnerable to sexual exploitation and human trafficking, while others distinguish this practice from the global sex industry, in which "sex work is done by consenting adults, where the act of selling or buying sexual services is not a violation of human rights." The term "sex work" is used interchangeably with "prostitution" in this article, in accordance with the World Health Organization (WHO 2001; WHO 2005) and the United Nations (UN 2006; UNAIDS 2002).

== Overview ==
In most countries, sex work is controversial. Members of certain religions oppose prostitution, viewing it as contrary or a threat to their moral codes, while other parties view prostitution as a "necessary evil". Sex worker activists and organizations believe the issue of sex worker human rights is of greatest importance, including those related to freedom of speech, travel, immigration, work, marriage, parenthood, insurance, health insurance, and housing.

Some feminist organizations are opposed to prostitution, considering it a form of exploitation in which males dominate women, and as a practice that is the result of a patriarchal social order. For example, the European Women's Lobby, which bills itself as the largest umbrella organization of women's associations in the European Union, has condemned prostitution as "an intolerable form of male violence". In February 2014, the members of the European Parliament voted in a non-binding resolution (adopted by 343 votes to 139; with 105 abstentions), in favor of the 'Swedish Model' of criminalizing the buying, but not the selling of sex. In 2014, the Council of Europe made a similar recommendation, stating that "While each system presents advantages and disadvantages, policies prohibiting the purchase of sexual services are those that are more likely to have a positive impact on reducing trafficking in human beings".

The Wolfenden Committee Report (1957), which informed the debate in the United Kingdom, states:

[the function of the criminal law is] to preserve public order and decency, to protect the citizen from what is injurious or offensive and to provide safeguards against the exploitation and corruption of others, ... It is not, in our view, the function of the law to intervene in the private lives of citizens, or to seek to enforce any particular code of behaviour, further than is necessary to carry out the purposes of what we have outlined.

Views on what the best legal framework on prostitution should be are often influenced by whether one can view prostitution as morally acceptable or not; indeed Save the Children wrote: "The issue, however, gets mired in controversy and confusion when prostitution too is considered as a violation of the basic human rights of both adult women and minors, and equal to sexual exploitation per se. From this standpoint then, trafficking and prostitution become conflated with each other."

In December 2012, the Joint United Nations Programme on HIV/AIDS (UNAIDS) released the "Prevention and treatment of HIV and other sexually transmitted infections for sex workers in low- and middle- income countries" document that contains the following "Good practice recommendations":

- All countries should work toward decriminalization of sex work and elimination of the unjust application of non-criminal laws and regulations against sex workers.
- Governments should establish antidiscrimination and other rights-respecting laws to protect against discrimination and violence, and other violations of rights faced by sex workers in order to realize their human rights and reduce their vulnerability to HIV infection and the impact of AIDS. Antidiscrimination laws and regulations should guarantee sex workers’ right to social, health and financial services.
- Health services should be made available, accessible and acceptable to sex workers based on the principles of avoidance of stigma, non-discrimination and the right to health.
- Violence against sex workers is a risk factor for HIV and must be prevented and addressed in partnership with sex workers and sex worker-led organizations.

== Legal themes ==
Legal themes tend to focus on four issues: victimization (including potential victimhood), ethics and morality, freedom of the individual, and general benefit or harm to society (including harm arising indirectly from matters connected to prostitution).

=== General ===
Many people who support legal prostitution argue that prostitution is a consensual sex act between adults and a victimless crime, thus the government should not prohibit this practice.

Many anti-prostitution advocates hold that prostitutes themselves are often victims, arguing that prostitution is a practice which can lead to serious psychological and often physical long-term effects for the prostitutes.

In 1999, Sweden became the first country to make it illegal to pay for sex, but not to be a prostitute (the client commits a crime, but not the prostitute). A similar law was passed in Norway and in Iceland (in 2009). Canada (2014), France (2016) the Republic of Ireland (2017) and Israel (2018; effective 2020) have also adopted a similar model to that of the Nordic countries (Denmark and Finland excluded).

=== Human trafficking ===
The United Nations Convention for the Suppression of the Traffic in Persons and the Exploitation of the Prostitution of Others favors criminalizing the activities of those seen as exploiting or coercing prostitutes (so-called "pimping" and "procuring" laws), while leaving sex workers free from regulation. The Convention states that "prostitution and the accompanying evil of the traffic in persons for the purpose of prostitution are incompatible with the dignity and worth of the human person".

Sigma Huda, a UN special reporter on trafficking in persons, said: "For the most part, prostitution as actually practiced in the world usually does satisfy the elements of trafficking. It is rare that one finds a case in which the path to prostitution or a person's experience with prostitution does not involve, at the very least, an abuse of power or an abuse of vulnerability. Power and vulnerability in this context must be understood to include disparities based on gender, race, ethnicity and poverty. Put simply the road to prostitution and life within “the life” is rarely marked by empowerment or adequate options."

However, sex worker activists and organizations distinguish between human trafficking and legitimate sex work, and assert the importance of recognizing that trafficking is not synonymous with sex work. The Sex Workers Alliance Ireland organization explains: "victims of human trafficking may be forced to work in industries such as agriculture, domestic service as well as the sex industry. It is critical to distinguish human trafficking, which is a violation of human rights, from voluntary migration." The Open Society Foundations organization states: "sex work is done by consenting adults, where the act of selling or buying sexual services is not a violation of human rights. In fact, sex workers are natural allies in the fight against trafficking. The UNAIDS Guidance Note on HIV and Sex Work recognizes that sex worker organizations are best positioned to refer people who are victims of trafficking to appropriate services."

According to a 2007 report by the United Nations Office on Drugs and Crime (UNODC), the most common destinations for victims of human trafficking are Thailand, Japan, Israel, Belgium, the Netherlands, Germany, Italy, Turkey, and the US. The major sources of trafficked persons include Thailand, China, Nigeria, Albania, Bulgaria, Belarus, Moldova, and Ukraine.

Researchers at Göteborg University released a report in 2010 that argued that prostitution laws affect trafficking flows.

=== Legislation models ===
NGOs, academics and governments often categorise the approach to prostitution laws into 5 models:

Models	1st parties (selling sex)	2nd parties (buying sex)	3rd parties (organizing sex)	Solicitation
Decriminalization	Legal			
Legalization	Regulated			
Abolitionism	Legal		Illegal	Often Illegal
Neo-abolitionism	Legal	Illegal		
Prohibition	Illegal			

==== Prohibitionism ====
Also known as criminalization, all aspects of prostitution are illegal in this framework. Often the sex trade is seen as a violation of human dignity, moral or religious beliefs.

==== Neo-abolitionism ====
Also called the "Swedish model" or "Nordic model," neo-abolitionists believe there is no free choice for people entering prostitution, which violates their human rights. Although prostitutes themselves commit no crime, clients and any third party involvement is criminalised.

==== Abolitionism ====
Prostitution itself is legal, but third-party involvement (i.e. procuring) is generally prohibited. Solicitation is also often prohibited. This model recognises that a prostitute may choose to work in the trade, but the law is designed to stop prostitution from impacting the wider public. An example country where this system is in place is England.

==== Legalization ====
Also called the "regulationist" framework, legalization allows for sex work to be regulated through legislation. The extent and type of control varies from country to country and may be regulated by work permits, licensing or tolerance zones, e.g. in the Netherlands. A historical example of zone restricted legalization is the institution of 'red-light' districts in Japan in the early 17th century, most famously the Yoshiwara district of Edo.

==== Decriminalization ====
The decriminalization of sex work is the removal of criminal penalties for sex work. Removing criminal prosecution for sex workers creates a safer and healthier environment and allows them to live with less social exclusion and stigma; e.g. in New Zealand.

== Demographic impact ==
=== Gender ===
Although prostitution is mainly performed by female prostitutes, there are also male, transgender and transvestite prostitutes performing straight or gay sex work. In Vienna, in April 2007, there were 1,352 female and 21 male prostitutes officially registered. The number of prostitutes who are not registered (and therefore work illegally) is not known. A 2009 study by TAMPEP estimated that 93% of prostitutes in Germany were female, while 4% were male and 3% were transgender.

Arrest statistics show that in those states where buying and selling sex are equally illegal, the tendency is to arrest the service provider and not the customer, even though there are significantly more customers than sellers. Thus, it is a fact that more women than men are arrested, and the true extent of the crime is underreported. James (1982) reports that, in the United States, the arrest ratio of women to men was 3:2, but notes that many of the men arrested were the prostitutes rather than the clients.

=== Developed vs. developing countries ===
"By 1975, Thailand, with the help of World Bank economists, had instituted a National Plan of Tourist Development, which specifically underwrote the sex industry... Without directly subsidising prostitution, the Act [the Entertainment Places Act] referred repeatedly to the personal services sector. According to Thai feminist Sukyana Hantrakul, the law 'was enacted to pave the way for whorehouses to be legalised in the guise of massage parlours, bars, nightclubs, tea houses, etc." The United Nations Convention on the Rights of the Child creates specific obligations for the protection of children from sexual exploitation. Article 34 stipulates that:

State Parties undertake to protect the child from all forms of sexual exploitation and sexual abuse. For these purposes, State Parties shall, in particular, take all appropriate national, bilateral, and multilateral measures to prevent:

The inducement or coercion of a child to engage in any unlawful sexual activity.
The exploitative use of children in prostitution or other unlawful sexual practices.
The exploitative use of children in pornographic performances and materials.

As of 2000, twenty-four countries had enacted legislation criminalising child sex tourism, e.g. in Australia, the Crimes (Child Sex Tourism) Amendment Act 1994 covers a wide range of sexual activities with children under the age of 16 committed overseas. Laws with extraterritorial application are intended to fill the gap when countries are unwilling or unable to take action against known offenders. The rationale is that child-sex offenders should not escape justice simply because they are in a position to return to their home country. There is little research into whether the child sex tourism legislation has any real deterrent effect on adults determined to have sex with children overseas. It may be that these people are simply more careful in their activities as a result of the laws. There are three obvious problems:

- low levels of reporting of sexual offences by child victims or their parents;
- poverty, which motivates the decision to provide sexual services in order to survive; and
- criminal justice systems which may lack transparency and/or involve hostile and intrusive cross-examination of child witnesses with no adult witnesses to corroborate their evidence.

== Views of prohibitionists ==
Those who support prohibition or abolition of prostitution argue that keeping prostitution illegal is the best way to prevent abusive and dangerous activities such as child prostitution and human trafficking. They argue that a system which allows legalized and regulated prostitution has very negative effects and does not improve the situation of the prostitutes; such legal systems only lead to crime and abuse: many women who work in licensed brothels are still controlled by outside pimps; many brothel owners are criminals themselves; the creation of a legal and regulated prostitution industry only leads to another parallel illegal industry, as many women do not want to register and work legally (since this would rob them of their anonymity) and other women can not be hired by legal brothels because of underlying problems (e.g., drug abuse); legalizing prostitution makes it more socially acceptable to buy sex, creating a demand for prostitutes (both by local men and by foreigners engaging in sex tourism) and, as a result, human trafficking and underage prostitution increase in order to satisfy this demand.

A five-country survey of 175 men for the International Organisation for Migration found that 75% preferred female prostitutes aged 25 or under, and over 20% preferred those aged 18 or under, although "generally clients did not wish to buy sex from prostitutes they thought to be too young to consent to the sexual encounter."

Some have argued that an extremely high level of violence is inherent to prostitution; they claim that many prostitutes have been the subject of violence, rape and coercion before entering prostitution including as children, and that many young women and girls enter prostitution directly from state care in at least England, Norway, Australia and Canada.

Abolitionists believe tolerance of prostitution is tolerance of inegalitarian sexuality in which male sexual demands can override women's sexual autonomy and overall well-being.

== Regulated prostitution ==
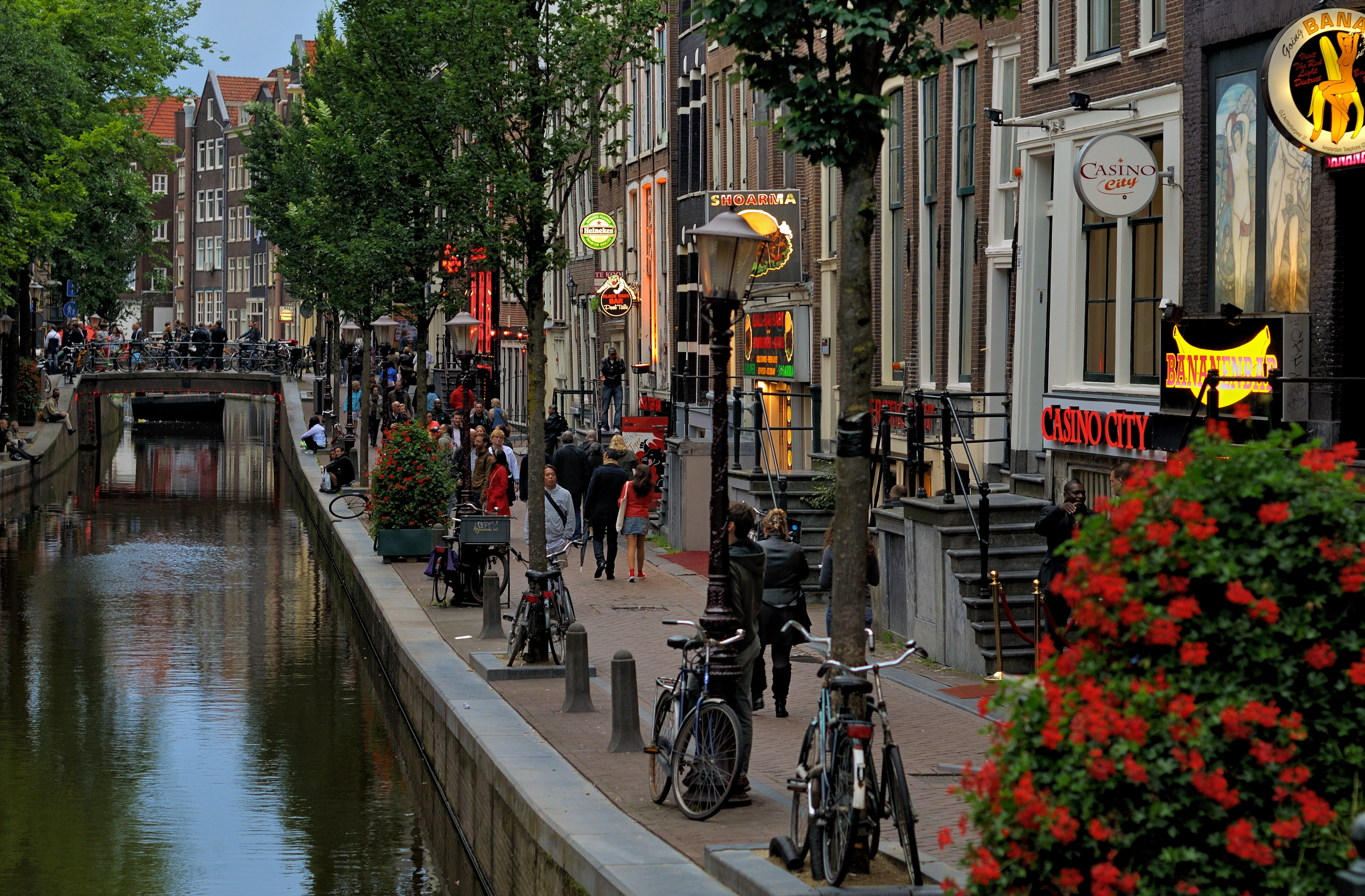
De Wallen, Amsterdam's red-light district, offers activities such as legal prostitution and a number of coffeeshops that sell marijuana. It is one of the main tourist attractions.

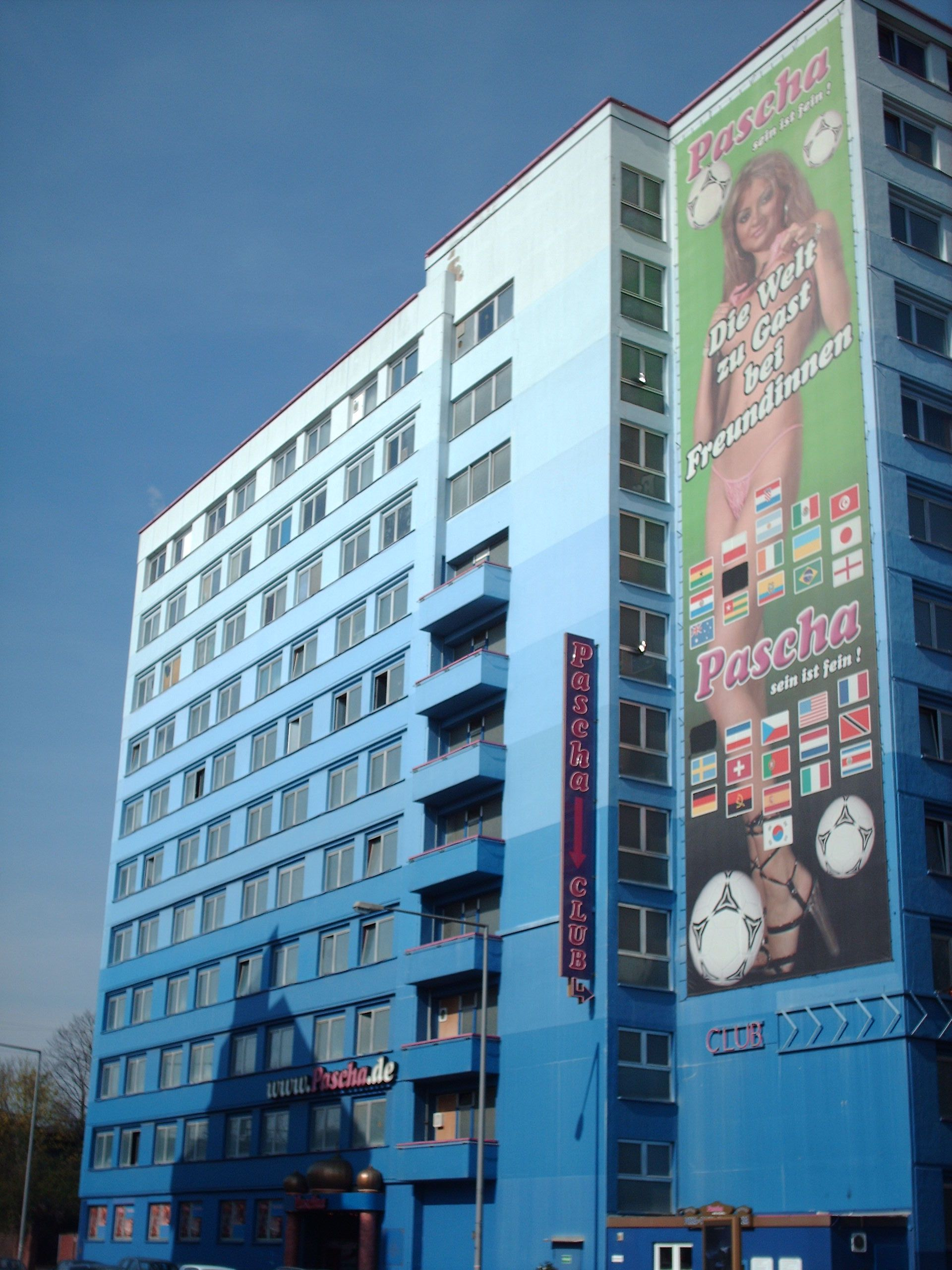
Pascha brothel in Cologne, Germany, is the largest brothel in Europe. Picture taken during the 2006 FIFA World Cup, the poster has the Saudi Arabian flag and Iranian flag blacked out after protests and threats.

In some countries or administrative subdivisions within a country, prostitution is legal and regulated. In these jurisdictions, there is a specific law, which explicitly allows the practice of prostitution if certain conditions are met (as opposed to places where prostitution is legal only because there is no law to prohibit it). Demands to legalise prostitution as a means to contain exploitation in the sex industry is now gaining support from organisations such as the United Nations and the Supreme Court of India.

In countries where prostitution is regulated, the prostitutes may be registered, they may be hired by a brothel, they may organize trade unions, they may be covered by workers' protection laws, their proceeds may be taxable, they may be required to undergo regular health checks, etc. The degree of regulation, however, varies very much by jurisdiction.. Such approaches are taken with the stance that prostitution is impossible to eliminate, and thus these societies have chosen to regulate it in an attempt to increase transparency and therefore reduce the more undesirable consequences and reduce harm. Goals of such regulations include controlling sexually transmitted disease; reducing sexual slavery; increasing safety for sex workers and clients; ensuring fair pay, fair work hours and safe and clean working conditions; controlling where brothels may operate; and dissociating prostitution from crime syndicates. Regulation also allows for the potential of introducing a minimum age requirement to become a sex worker, enter a brothel, and to engage in sexual activity with a sex worker.

Dutch researchers have found significant reductions in drug-related crime in areas where prostitution is legal and licensed. "In cities with both a tippelzone and a licensing requirement, for instance, they found a 25 percent reduction in drug-related crimes within two years."

In countries where prostitution is legal and regulated, it is usual for the practice to be restricted to particular areas.

In countries where prostitution itself is legal, but associated activities are outlawed, prostitution is generally not regulated.

=== Protection of sex workers ===
"A study of San Francisco prostitutes [where prostitution is illegal] found that 82% had been assaulted and 68% had been raped while working as prostitutes. Another study of prostitutes in Colorado Springs [where prostitution is also illegal] found they were 18 times more likely to be murdered than non-prostitutes their age and race." A paper by Barbara Brents and Kathryn Hausbeck of the University of Nevada concluded that "brothels offer the safest environment available for women to sell consensual sex acts for money." Prostitutes who experience violence can be more reluctant to call the police if they are involved in an illegal business, whereas Brents and Hausbeck observed that brothel owners policies to call the police in emergencies involving workers. In systems where prostitution is not legal, regulated pimps also often use prostitutes "who are often under aged and forced to work or face severe consequences, therefore mitigating consent." Legalization and regulation can then enforce minimum age laws and employment rights for prostitutes to protect against such harms. Advocates of this method argue that if legal and regulated time and money could also be saved by the police force, public defenders, and the judicial system in not prosecuting prostitutes and their clients, which could then be better spent targeting pimps and providing health care for prostitutes.

Researchers found a 30 to 40% drop in reports of rape and sexual abuse in the first two years after tippelzones, or areas where street prostitutes could work legally, opened in areas of major cities in the Netherlands.

=== Mandatory health checks ===
Some countries and jurisdictions require that prostitutes undergo regular health checks for sexually transmitted diseases. This is the case in Germany, where the 2024 Erobella Sex Worker Wellbeing Survey, which had 270 responses from May 2024 to January 2025, indicated "that 70–80% report good or very good physical health linked to mandatory health checks".

In Nevada, state law requires that registered brothel prostitutes be checked weekly for several sexually transmitted diseases and monthly for HIV; condoms are mandatory for all oral sex and sexual intercourse. Brothel owners may be held liable if customers become infected with HIV after a prostitute has tested positive for the virus. Prostitution outside licensed brothels is illegal throughout the state; all forms of prostitution are illegal in Las Vegas (and Clark County, which contains its metropolitan area), in Reno (and Washoe County), in Carson City, and in a few other parts of the state (see Prostitution in Nevada).

The United Nations Development Programme published a report in 2012 on illegal sex work in Asia and the Pacific. The report stated that "Criminalization increases vulnerability to HIV by fueling stigma and discrimination, limiting access to HIV and sexual health services, condoms and harm reduction services, and adversely affecting the self-esteem of sex workers and their ability to make informed choices about their health."

=== Labour laws ===
The regulation of prostitution is problematic because some standard labor regulations cannot be applied to prostitution. The typical relation between employer and employee where the employer is in a position of authority over the employee is, in the case of prostitution, viewed by many as contrary to the physical integrity of the prostitute. It is forbidden to order a person to have sex on a given moment at a given place. Many sex operators also do not want to pay social security contributions, which comes with paid labor. Therefore, many prostitutes, in countries where prostitution is regulated, are officially listed as independent contractors. Sex operators typically operate as facilitators only and do not interfere with the prostitutes.

=== Status of unregulated sex work ===
The existence of regulated prostitution generally implies that prostitution is illegal outside of the regulated context.

== Enforcement ==
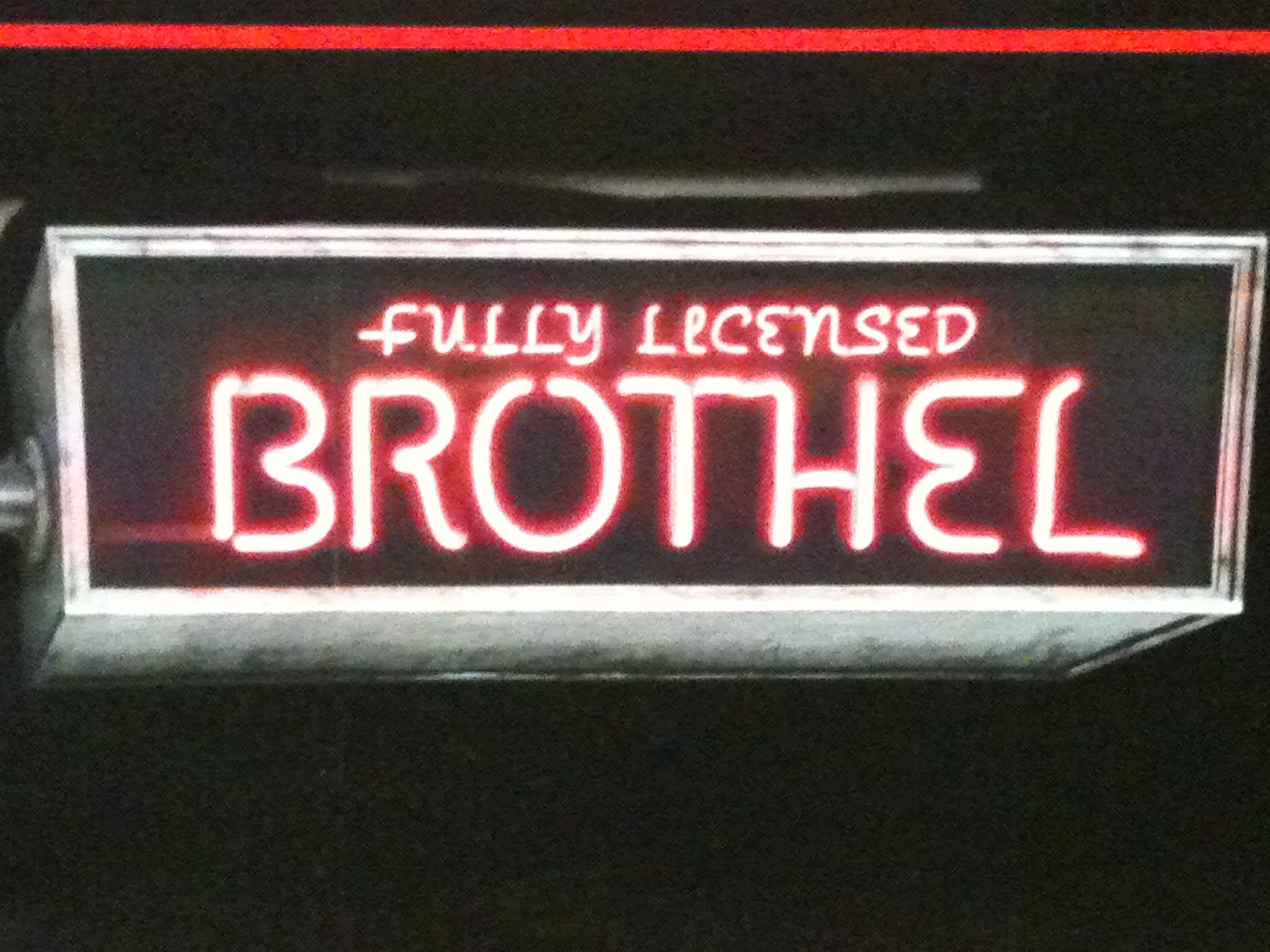

The enforcement of the anti-prostitution laws varies from country to country or from region to region. In areas where prostitution or associated activities are illegal, prostitutes are commonly charged with crimes ranging from minor infractions such as loitering to more serious crimes like tax evasion. Their clients can also be charged with solicitation of prostitution.

== See also ==
- COYOTE
- International Committee for Prostitutes' Rights
- International Day to End Violence Against Sex Workers
- Optional Protocol to the Convention on the Rights of the Child on the Sale of Children, Child Prostitution and Child Pornography
- Protocol to Prevent, Suppress and Punish Trafficking in Persons, especially Women and Children
- Revolting Prostitutes
- Sex workers' rights
- Special Rapporteur on the sale of children, child prostitution and child pornography
- World Charter for Prostitutes' Rights
