= A Vindication of the Rights of Whores =

1989 feminist anthology

A Vindication of The Rights of Whores
- Cover of A Vindication of The Rights of Whores
- Author: Gail Pheterson
- Cover artist: Clare Conrad
- Language: English
- Subject: Sex work, prostitution, sex workers rights, sex-positive feminism, human rights, women's studies
- Genre: Anthology
- Publisher: 1st edition by Seal Press; 2nd edition by Biblio Services Inc.
- Publication date: 1989, 2019
- Publication place: United States
- Media type: Paperback book
- Pages: 353
- ISBN: 978-1-64131-228-8
- Website: rightsofwhores.com

A Vindication of The Rights of Whores is a 1989 anthology edited by Gail Pheterson with a preface by Margo St. James. The book consists of the voices of a diverse group of prostitutes, sex worker rights activists, and feminist scholars from around the world, discussing their lives and concerns. It includes the complete text of the World Charter for Prostitutes' Rights; unedited transcripts of workshops arranged by topic from the First World Whores' Congress held in Amsterdam in February 1985 and Second World Whores' Congress at the European Parliament held in Brussels in October 1986; position papers; as well as interviews with various participants. The anthology's name references Mary Wollstonecraft's 18th-century feminist work A Vindication of the Rights of Woman. It is cited in at least 75 other works and appears in various reading lists and curriculum guides.

== Background and the Second World Whores' Congress ==
In the lead up to the First World Whores' Congress, a multitude of labor organizations and activist groups, such as COYOTE and the Netherlands' Red Thread (De Rode Draad), had fought to change the stigma surrounding sex work and reestablish sex work as a legitimate job and livelihood. Their main goal was to reframe prostitutes from victims forced in sex work as women with agency who, in the majority of cases, voluntarily choose to engage in sex work.

=== First World Whores' Congress ===
Imagined by Gail Pheterson, a feminist and psychology professor, and Margo St. James, a former sex worker, with the funding from Netherlands feminist Mama Cash, the first World Whores' Congress convened in Amsterdam, Netherlands in 1985. The convention was held over a three day period in February of that year with an approximate total of one hundred attendees present, primarily from countries across western Europe, the United States, and Canada. Notably, limited funding prevented the convention's ability to cover the travel costs for non-Western prostitutes. The primary results of the first World Whores' Congress was the foundation of the International Committee for Prostitutes' Rights (ICPR) and the adoption of the World Charter for Prostitutes' Rights.

=== Second World Whores' Congress ===
The Second World Whores' Congress was held in October 1986 in Brussels, Belgium. The conference was hosted by the Green Alternative European Link (GRAEL), a part of the Rainbow Group, in European Parliament (EP) buildings with help from EP member Annemiek Onstenk and two feminist organizations, the Women's Organization for Equality (WOE) and Association 29 Rue Blanche, to provide housing for the convention's attendees. Approximately 125 prostitutes attended the three-day event with almost 200 attendees in total.

The convention received significant pushback from conservative EP members for the use of EP funds to hold the Second World Whores' Congress. The English Collective of Prostitutes (ECP) also criticized the Congress and the ICPR for its lack of denouncing police forces for their violent and racist treatment of prostitutes and for the Congress' limited discussions on the impacts economics and women's poverty has on women who choose to engage in sex work. Only a few, trusted journalists were invited to attend the Congress' sessions and a strict rule against photos being taken during any of the sessions was put in place.

Three distinct sessions made up the Congress, each occurring over the course of a full day. The first day's session focused on "Prostitution and Human Rights", particularly, addressing the human rights violations towards prostitutes in each country. The second session prioritized "Prostitution and Health", heavily discussing the AIDS crisis, and "Prostitution and Feminism" was the topic of the third session. The third session was open to all women, so long as they registered in advance, unlike the previous two sessions which were limited to sex workers and advocates. The Second World Whores' Congress concluded with participants deciding to hold regional meetings and publish a newsletter before the next World Whores' Congress.

== Contributors ==
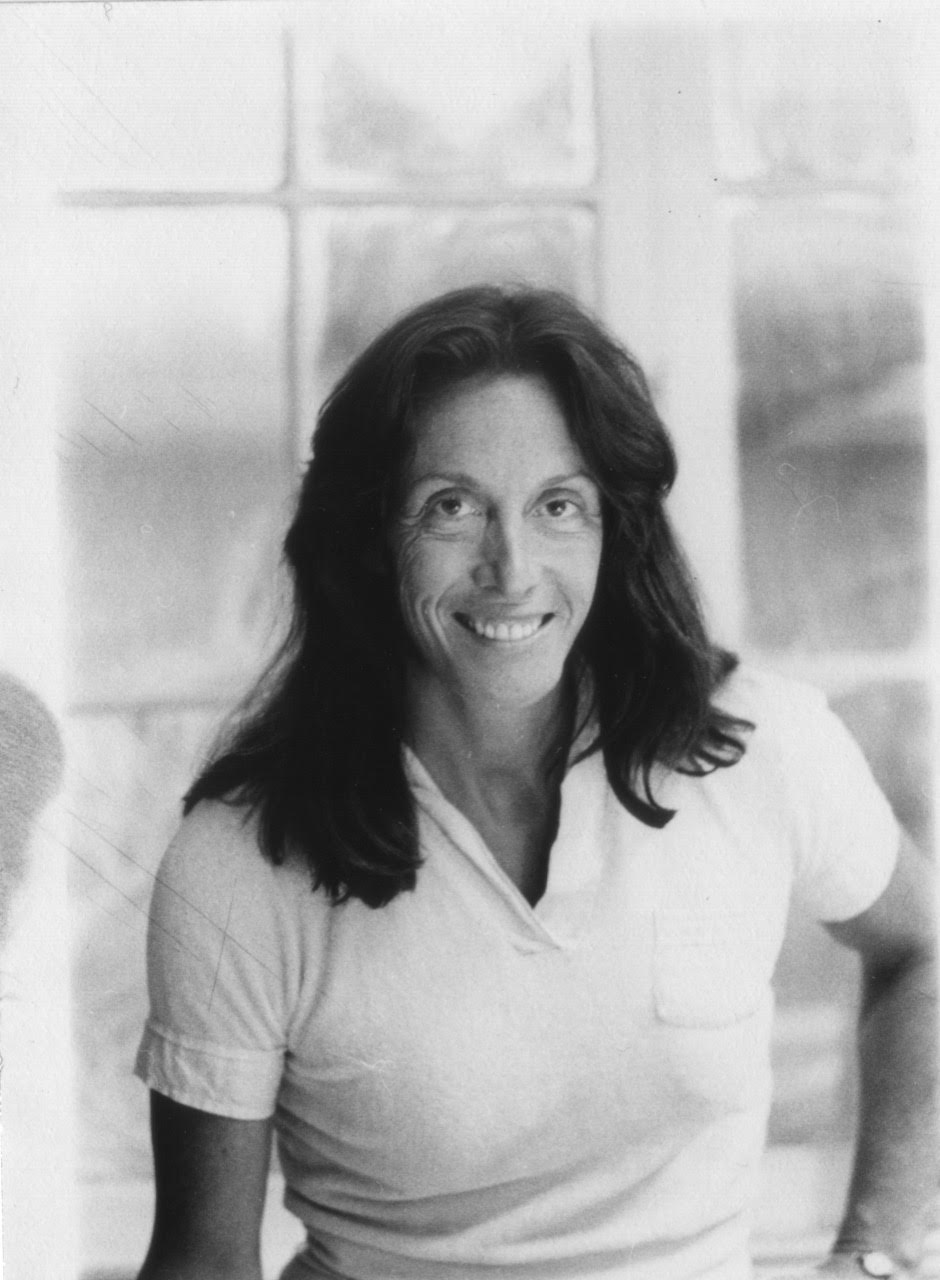
Margo St. James

The anthology of essays, transcripts, and interviews that make up The Vindication of the Rights of Whores includes reports from prostitutes in Europe, South America, North America, Asia, and Africa. Almost 60 different sex workers and activists contributed to the anthology, including Gail Pheterson, who edited the collection, and Margo St. James, who provided the preface. A short bio on each contributor is provided within the book following its acknowledgements. In order to keep the sex workers who contributed to the anthology safe, particularly sex workers who live in a country where prostitution is criminalized, each contributor decided whether to provide their real name or a pseudonym within The Vindication of the Rights of Whores. Contributors to the anthology are listed as follows:

- Alex
- Annemeik Onstenk
- Annie Sprinkle (Ellen Steinberg)
- Ans van der Drift
- Bianca
- Brigitte Pavkovic
- Carla Corso
- Christine
- Danny Cockerline
- Dolly De Luca
- Dolores French
- Don Des Jarlais
- Doris Stoeri
- Esther Eillam
- Eva Rosta
- Frau EVA
- Flori Lille
- Gabriela Silva Leite
- Gail Pheterson
- Gill Gem
- Gloria Lockett
- Grisélidis Réal
- Hans-Guenter Meyer-Thomsen
- Helen Buckingham
- Inge
- Jean D'Cunha
- Laurel Meredith Hall
- Licia Brussa
- Lin Lap
- Mae
- Maggie
- Margo St. James
- Margot Alvarez
- Marjo Meijer
- Maud Marin
- Nel van Dijk
- Nena
- Norma Jean Almodovar
- Odile
- Paola Tabet
- Pauline
- Peggie Miller
- Pia Covre
- Pieke Biermann
- Priscilla Alexander
- Roberta Tatafiore
- Sai
- Saraswati Sunindyo
- Sonia
- Susanna
- Syarifah Sabaroedin
- Tatiana Cordero
- Terry van der Zijden
- Thruong Thanh-Dam
- Veronica Vera
- Violet
- Zippy

== Content ==
Broken up into four parts, the anthology includes transcripts from the Second World Whores' Congress, original essays, and compiles interviews from prostitutes worldwide on current issues. The first section, entitled "Not Repeating History," consists of only one essay of the same name written by Gail Pheterson. Section two, titled "The Congresses," includes the history and logistics of the Second World Whores' Congress, as well as transcripts from over the course of the three-day convention, with talks such as "Simple Human Respect," "Our First Concern," and "Crunch Point," being provided for readers. Labeled "Migration and Prostitution," the third section pulls from interviews with prostitutes across the globe to denote and discuss issues currently impacting sex workers in different regions or countries. The final section, "Reports and New Voices," details the new connections with sex worker activists the ICPR had recently made or were in process of making when the anthology was released. New efforts were being made to expand the ICPR's network of connections. As this section notes, the ICPR had recently attended an Asian congress where sex workers from throughout Asia, including the Philippines, Thailand, South Korea, Taiwan, and Japan, were present.

== Publishing and reception ==
Released in 1989, A Vindication of the Rights of Whores was published by Seal Press, now an imprint of Hachette, in Seattle, Washington. Seal Press was founded in 1976 and describes itself as a feminist publishing house that grew out of the 1970s women's press movement. The anthology received positive reactions from radical and sex-positive feminists, such as Carole Vance and Ann Snitow, who organized several events in New York to promote the book's release. A book tour was organized by Gail Pheterson and Margo St. James that resulted in a conference in San Francisco in 1989 called the World Whores' Summit. A second, augmented version of the anthology was released in 2019 and is available as a print on demand book from Biblio Services

== See also ==
- International Day to End Violence Against Sex Workers
- Revolting Prostitutes
