= Tatiana Cordero Velázquez =

Ecuadorian feminist (1961–2021)

- Born: February 23, 1961; Quito, Ecuador
- Died: May 13, 2021 (aged 60); Quito, Ecuador
- Occupation: Activist

Tatiana Cordero Velázquez (February 23, 1961 – April 13, 2021) was an Ecuadorian feminist and is considered one of the forerunners in the fight for women's rights and LGBT rights in Ecuador. At the time of her death, she was the director of the Urgent Action Fund for Latin America and the Caribbean, which is an association that she founded.

== Career ==
In 1989, together with the activist Nela Meriguet, Cordero Velázquez created the Women's Communication Workshop: a feminist organization that focused its efforts on developing maps to report femicide cases in Ecuador, and on promoting educational projects that question heteronormativity. She was also notable for denouncing the existence of so-called "de-homosexualization clinics", both in Ecuador and abroad.

In 1991, Cordero Velázquez co-wrote the book Nosotras, las señoras alegres (literally "We, the happy women") with Ecuadorian feminists Rosa Manzo Rodas and Marena Briones Velasteguí. The book focuses on prostitution in Ecuador, and references many personal experiences from Ecuadorian sex workers in Asociacion de Mujeres Autonomas "22nd de Junio" (June 22 Association of Autonomous Women), a labor union for female sex workers, which was the first sex workers' organization to be founded in Latin America.

== Personal life and death ==
Cordero Velázquez died of cancer on April 13, 2021, in Quito. Among the people who publicly lamented her death were the Vice President of the Quito Board of Rights, Sybel Martínez, and the municipal health secretary, Ximena Abarca.

Cordero Velázquez was a lesbian.
