= Prostitution in Ecuador =

Prostitution in Ecuador is legal and regulated, as long as the prostitute is over the age of 18, registered, and works from a licensed brothel. Prostitution is widespread throughout the country. Many brothels and prostitutes operate outside the regulatory system and the regulations have been less strictly enforced in recent years. 25,000 prostitutes were registered in the year 2000. In 2007 it was estimated that 70% of the prostitutes in the country were from Colombia. The country attracts Colombian prostitutes as the currency is the US$ rather than the unstable Colombian peso. UNAIDS estimate there to be 35,000 prostitutes in the country.

Quito was the first city in Ecuador to regulate prostitution in 1921, requiring prostitutes to be tested weekly for STIs. The results were recorded in the "Register of Venereal Disease". Testing and any necessary treatment were free to the prostitutes. Guayaquil and Riobamba introduced a similar system of regulation in 1925. In 1939, about 1,000 prostitutes were registered in Quito.

In 2015, 6 hotels used for prostitution were closed down by the authorities in the Historic Centre of Quito. Following protests by the sex workers, the administrator of the Central Zone, Joffre Echeverría, pledged to set up a new zone for them to work in.

Brothels are known as "chongos" or "licensed centers of tolerance".

== Legal situation ==
There is no law to criminalise sex workers or those who organise prostitutes. The National Health Code of Ecuador requires sex work in brothels to be monitored by the Department of Health.

Brothels are required to be registered and sex workers are licensed. To obtain a licence ("carnet"), the prostitute must undergo a medical examination and be free from syphilis, chlamydia and HIV. The prostitutes must be reexamined every 9 – 15 days and the licence updated. If the prostitute tests positive for STIs, their licence is suspended or revoked.

The licence resembles a passport and contains a photograph of the sex worker. Prostitutes have demanded that the photographs be removed and the details of STI testing encrypted.

Street prostitution is dealt with under public order laws.

== Sex workers organisations ==
The first sex workers organisation in Latin America, "Asociacion de Mujeres Autonomas "22nd de Junio"" (Association of Autonomous Women 22 June) was set up in Machala in 1985. The idea of the organisation came from an idea by a physician working at the clinic where the woman received their check-ups. In 1988, the organisation organised a strike in response to increases in the rent for the rooms the women worked in. The women locked themselves in a brothel for a week to obtain their demands. The success led to an increase in membership. A general strike was organised in 2000 over a number of issues, including the need for better security, better hygiene and stable rent prices. The organisation receives some funding from international women's organisations such as Mama Cash in the Netherlands and the Global Fund for Women in the United States.

Organisations have also been set up in other parts of the country. In Quito women who work in brothels have set up "Association Pro-Defense of Women (ASPRODEMU)", street workers "Association For a Better Future" and "Association 1st of May" and transgender workers the "Association of Trans Sex Workers of Quito (Aso TST UIO)". In Guayaquil there is the " Association of Autonomous Female Workers 1st of August" and in "Association of Women from Milagro Canton" in Guayas Province.

In April 2005, the "Red de Trabajadoras Sexuales del Ecuador" (Network of Sex Workers of Ecuador), commonly known as REDTRABSEX, was set up to give a collective voice for all the individual associations. The organisation partnered with the Ministry of Health in 2008 to provide contraception and information on HIV/AIDS to sex workers.

== Galápagos Islands ==
The Ecuadorian military ensures that there are prostitutes available for their personnel stationed in the Galápagos Islands (part of Ecuador). Just outside the most populated town on the islands, Puerto Ayora, there are 3 brothels.

== Child prostitution ==
Child prostitution is a widely recognised problem, especially on the seaport of Esmeraldas. A 2002 International Labor Organization report estimated that 5,200 minors were engaged in prostitution.

Many child prostitutes have been abandoned or orphaned by one or both parents; some poverty-stricken parents also sell their children, wittingly or unwittingly, into prostitution. More than half of the girls involved in prostitution work in illegal establishments.

Most child victims are trafficked internally for prostitution, but some children are also trafficked to other countries, in particular to Venezuela. The victims are usually children who are kidnapped, sold by their parents, or deceived by false employment opportunities. These children are first exploited through prostitution at the average age of 12.

As the age of consent in Ecuador is 14 and teenagers can start work at 15, some girls start working as prostitutes in the unregulated sector at 15, or even earlier with false documents. Law enforcement on underage girls working in brothels is lax. In 2006 it was estimated that the average age of entering prostitution was 15.

== HIV ==
HIV is a problem in the country and sex workers are a high risk group. It was estimated that in 2016 0.30% of the adult population was infected.

The sex workers network, REDTRABSEX, partnered with the Ministry of Health in 2008 to provide contraception and information on HIV/AIDS to sex workers.

Lack of education and reluctance to use condoms are significant factors in the spread of the infection. Because of the reluctance to use male condoms, sex worker organisations have distributed female condoms.

== Sex trafficking ==
Ecuador is a source, transit, and destination country for men, women, and children subjected to sex trafficking. Ecuadorian men, women, and children are exploited in sex trafficking within the country. Indigenous and Afro-Ecuadorians, as well as Colombian refugees and migrants, are particularly vulnerable to human trafficking. Women, children, refugees, and migrants continued to be the most vulnerable to sex trafficking, but NGOs reported an increase in LGBTI individuals vulnerable to or victims of sex trafficking. Nationals of Cuba, Ghana, Cameroon, Nigeria, Chad, China, Pakistan, the Dominican Republic and Haiti, initially lured by smugglers promising a better life, have documents confiscated, debts imposed, and are forced into prostitution.

Ecuador is also a destination for Colombian, Peruvian, Dominican, Venezuelan, Mexican, Haitian, Paraguayan, and Cuban women and girls exploited in sex trafficking. Traffickers used Ecuador as a transit route for trafficking victims from Colombia, Cuba, Haiti, and the Dominican Republic. Sex traffickers use emotional relationships and job offers to recruit victims and prey on vulnerabilities such as prior domestic and sexual violence.

The United States Department of State Office to Monitor and Combat Trafficking in Persons class Ecuador as a Tier 2 country.
