= Revolting Prostitutes =

2018 book by Juno Mac and Molly Smith

- Front cover of the first edition
- Authors: Juno Mac and Molly Smith
- Subject: Prostitution, prostitution law, sex work, sex workers' rights
- Publisher: Verso Books
- Publication date: November 2018
- Publication place: United Kingdom
- Pages: 288 pp.
- ISBN: 9781786633613
- Website: https://www.versobooks.com/books/3039-revolting-prostitutes

Revolting Prostitutes: The Fight for Sex Workers' Rights is a 2018 book by sex workers Juno Mac and Molly Smith that analyses global sex work policies and argues for full decriminalisation. The book covers topics including survival sex, migrant sex work, feminist views on sex work, and drug use among sex workers. The authors believe that common criticisms of sex work are more general issues with capitalism. The book received positive critical reception.

== Background ==
External videos
- "The Nordic Model makes sex workers LESS safe"
- "Deporting sex workers isn't 'rescue'" Promotional videos by Verso, March 2020. Mac and Smith discuss ideas from Revolting Prostitutes.

The authors Juno Mac and Molly Smith entered the sex work industry around 2010 at the ages of 20. Mac's previous job was a year-long internship at a magazine for £30 per day, while Smith previously worked at a coffee shop. Initially liberal feminists, the pair became involved in sex workers' rights activism, eventually identifying as communists. Both joined the Sex Worker Advocacy and Resistance Movement (SWARM), and Smith also worked with the Edinburgh charity SCOT-PEP, which advocates for sex work decriminalisation. They met in April 2013 at an activist event in Glasgow. Smith said her activism led her to develop her views relating to other areas including migration, drug criminalisation, and capitalism. The book was published in November 2018. That month, launch events in Ireland took place in Cork and Dublin. A second edition was published in March 2020.

== Synopsis ==
The book discusses the effects of different sex work policies on the lives of sex workers, including analysis of decriminalisation in countries like New Zealand; legalisation in places such as the Netherlands; the Nordic model; partial criminalisation in the UK; and full criminalisation in locales including the U.S. Mac and Smith argue for full decriminalisation of all sex work, and suggest legal policies which would provide sex workers with additional labour rights. Using a Marxist feminist and materialist framework, they argue that issues with sex work are not unique to the industry, but are instead issues of labour exploitation under capitalism. The authors hold the perspective that almost all sex work is done out of material necessity. Sex work is described as a form of "survival labor", noting that many workers enter the industry after experiencing unstable low-wage jobs in other sectors, such as domestic work or factory labour. They discuss survival sex as well as groups including disabled people, undocumented migrants, or the LGBTQ community who may have no job options other than sex work.

The authors also discuss cultural assumptions about “work,” arguing that sex work should be understood primarily as income-generating labour rather than as a moral or personal identity. They further explore parallels between sex work and other forms of labour shaped by economic precarity, highlighting how restrictive working conditions and limited autonomy are not unique to the sex industry. Touching on social-constructionist ideas, such as those of Jeffrey Weeks, they situate sex work within broader debates about how sexual categories and practices are shaped through law, politics, and public discourse.

Mac and Smith criticise anti-prostitution feminism and carceral feminism, a movement advocating lengthier prison sentences and more stringent law enforcement to solve social issues relating to sex. They provide evidence that legal restrictions in some countries have not improved the lives of sex workers, and discuss statistics relating to the Nordic model, in which the purchase of sex, but not the sale of sex, is criminalised. The authors argue that the Nordic model makes sex work more dangerous by discouraging reliable clients and encouraging riskier encounters. In general, they believe criminalisation causes sex workers to work in more dangerous locations, to hire procurers who may put them at risk, or to be at a higher chance of being extorted by police. They comment that engaging in sex work, or receiving a criminal record for such work, can lead to housing instability or losing custody of one's children.

The book contains examples of experiences by many migrant sex workers and their interactions with law enforcement. They argue that treating clients as having "purchased" the worker's body is misleading, comparing sex work to service occupations where consent and body autonomy remains.

The book also examines the U.S. war on drugs and drug use among sex workers. It further describes debates around the idea of a “deserving client,” usually framed as a disabled man who is believed to need sex workers as the only way to experience physical intimacy. Mac and Smith argue that this framing is ableist and reinforces the desexualisation of disabled people

== Reception ==
The first copies of the book had sold out by 29 December, Smith reporting that sales in the first six weeks matched Verso's expectations of sales after a year. The book was nominated for the Bread and Roses Award in 2019, a British award which aims to honour the best radical left-wing books of the year. The Chronicle of Higher Education listed the book as one of "The Best Scholarly Books" published in the 2010s, with the reviewer Amia Srinivasan calling it a "thrilling and formidable intervention into contemporary discussions of sex work". The philosopher Tom Whyman, writing in The Guardian, called it "one of the best interdisciplinary political books in recent years".

The book received positive reviews from journalists and scholars, including Mike Wold, Jennifer McGibbon, Zahra Zsuzsanna Stardust, and Wendy Lyon. McGibbon argues that the book adopts a practical materialist feminist approach that rejects moral binaries about sex work and centers the economic realities of survival sex work. The author's emphasis on broader political and economic structures is also acknowledged by McGibbon—such as border regimes, state violence, and policy constraints—as key forces producing vulnerability in the sex trade. Legal scholar Zahra Zsuzsanna Stardust situates the book within feminist legal debates, describing it as a critique of carceral feminism and of policies that rely on policing and punishment as gender-justice strategies. Stardust further notes that the book's interviews and policy analysis offer a crucial corrective to legal debates that overlook sex workers' agency and material needs. Together, these academic assessments position Revolting Prostitutes as a significant contribution to contemporary feminist theory, illuminating how economic inequality, legal structures, and state power shape the lived realities of sexual labour.

Reviewers in socialist and progressive media also emphasised the book's anyltical clarity. It was praised in the socialist magazines Monthly Review and Jacobin, by Brit Schulte and Natalie Shure, respectively. Schulte believed that "the necessity of reading Revolting Prostitutes in this political landscape cannot be understated". The writing received positive reception, Srinivasan praising it as "a model of how to write about politics". Lyon found that the "writing is impressive throughout", while Wold said that the authors put forward "a compelling case" for their recommended policy approaches. The book's factual content was also met with praise. Schulte praised it as "exhaustively researched to foreground the voices and experiences of sex workers" and Lyon found that the "referencing displays a laudable commitment to evidence-based advocacy". Shure found that the book contained "robust economic analysis". Lyon highlighted the chapter on sex trafficking and borders as "particularly impressive".

== See also ==
- A Vindication of the Rights of Whores
