= Sex worker =

Person who works in the sex industry

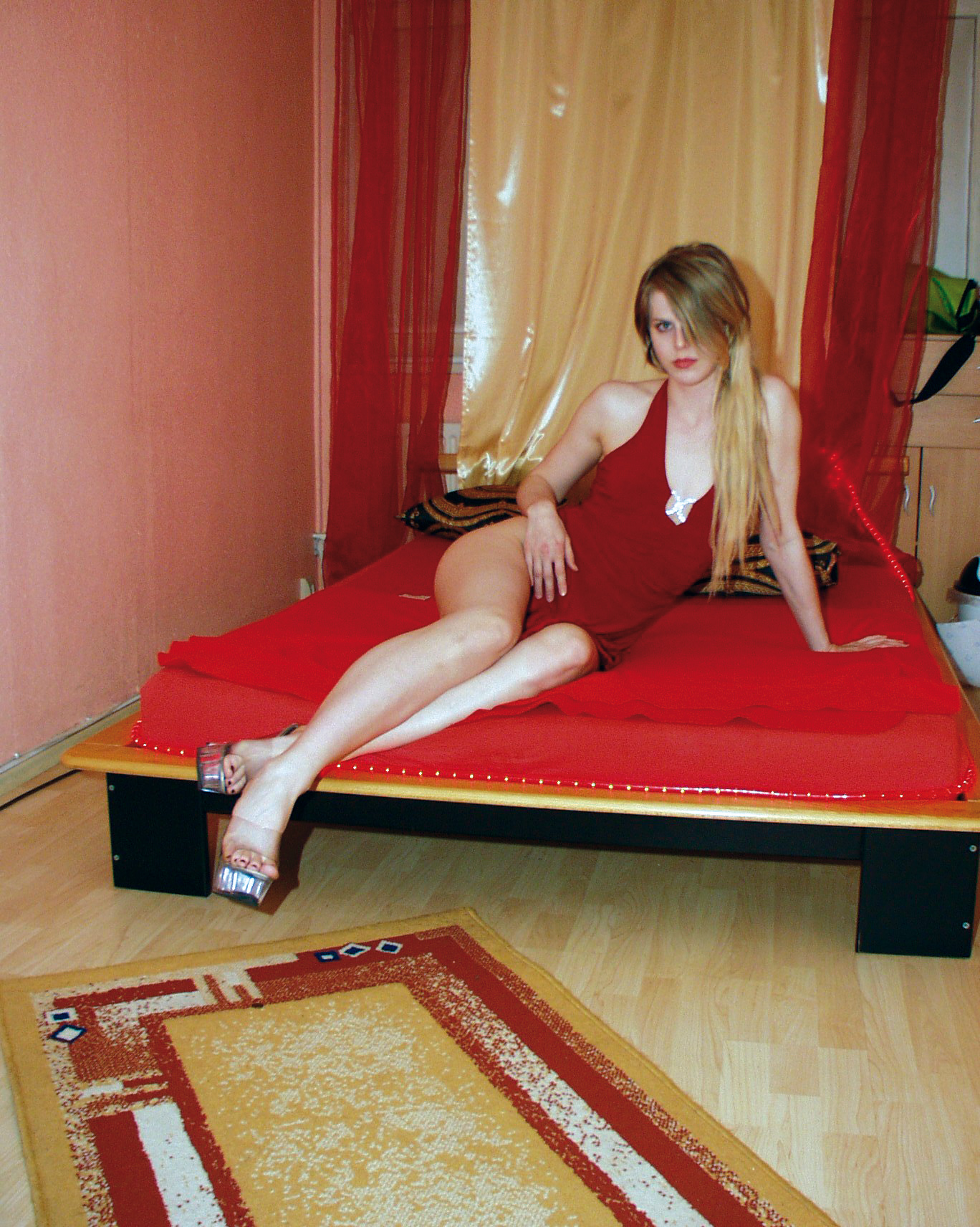
A sex worker in a German brothel in 1999

A sex worker is a person who provides sex work, either on a regular or occasional basis. The term is used in reference to those who work in all areas of the sex industry. According to one view, sex work is voluntary "and is seen as the commercial exchange of sex for money or goods". In light of this principle, it will therefore differ from sexual exploitation, or the forcing of a person to commit sexual acts. Other positions may maintain, however, that any commercial exchange of sex for money or goods will necessarily constitute sexual exploitation.

== Terminology ==
The term "sex worker" was coined in 1978 by sex worker activist Carol Leigh. Its use became popularized after publication of the anthology, Sex Work: Writings By Women In The Sex Industry in 1987, edited by Frédérique Delacoste and Priscilla Alexander. The term "sex worker" has since spread into much wider use, including in academic publications, by NGOs and labor unions, and by governmental and intergovernmental agencies, such as the World Health Organization. The term is listed in the Oxford English Dictionary and Merriam-Webster's Dictionary.

The term "sex worker" is used by some to avoid invoking the stigma associated with the word "prostitute". Using the term "sex worker" rather than "prostitute" also allows more members of the sex industry to be represented and helps ensure that individuals who are actually prostitutes are not singled out and associated with the negative connotations of "prostitute". In addition, choosing to use the term "sex worker" rather than "prostitute" shows ownership over the individuals' career choices. Some argue that those who prefer the term "sex worker" wish to separate their occupation from their person. Describing someone as a sex worker recognizes that the individual may have many different facets, and are not necessarily defined by their job.

The term is strongly opposed, however, by anti-prostitution feminists, who view prostitution as victimization and see the term "sex work" as legitimizing exploitation as a type of labor. Social conservatives also disagree with the term, since they see the practice of prostitution as a violation of traditional sexual morality and consequently do not wish it to be accorded the status of respectable labor either.

== In practice ==
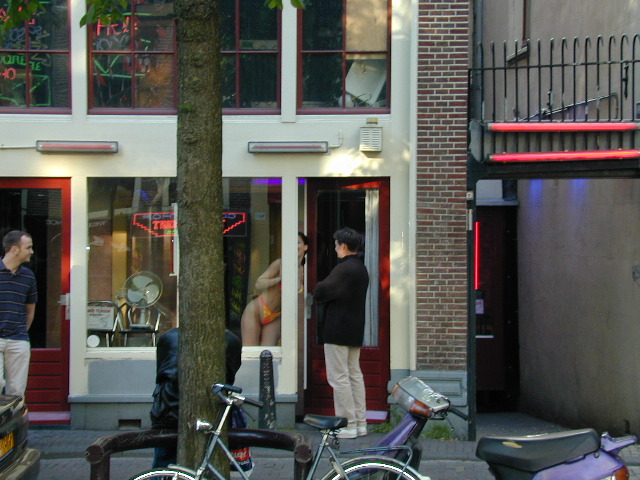
A sex worker in Amsterdam's red-light district talks with a potential client in 2000

Sex work can take the form of prostitution, stripping or lap dancing, performance in pornography, phone sex or webcam modelling, or any other exchange of sexual services for financial or material gain. Sex workers who include sexual intercourse as part of their services are considered 'full-service' sex workers. The variety in the tasks encompassed by sex work leads to a large range in both severity and nature of risks that sex workers face in their occupations. Sex workers can act independently as individuals, work for a company or corporation, or work as part of a brothel. All of the above can be undertaken either by free choice or by coercion, or, as some argue, along a continuum between conflict and agency. Sex workers may also be hired to be companions on a trip or to perform sexual services within the context of a trip; either of these can be voluntary or forced labor.

=== Motivations ===
Sex workers may be any gender and exchange sexual services or favors for money or other gifts. The motives of sex workers vary widely and can include debt, coercion, survival, or simply as a way to earn a living. Sexual empowerment is another possible reason why people engage in sex work. One Canadian study found that a quarter of the sex workers interviewed started sex work because they found it "appealing". The flexibility to choose hours of work and the ability to select one's own client base may also contribute to the appeal of sex work when compared to other service industry jobs. Sex work may also be a way to fund addiction. This line of work can be fueled by an individual's addiction to illegal substances before entering the industry or being introduced to these substances after entering the industry.

For camming services, motivations can vary when engaging in sex with real-life versus virtual partners. A 2023 study found that sex workers providing camming services were more likely to engage in sex with virtual partners for resources and specific types of sexual experiences such as sexual fetishism and sadomasochism. In contrast, they engaged in sex more often with real-life partners for physical pleasure, motivated by the physical desirability of their partner, and to express love and commitment. However, for many other motivations, such as stress reduction, self-esteem boost, emotional expression, or utilitarian reasons, there were no significant differences in frequency of engagement with real-life versus virtual partners.

These motives also align with varying climates surrounding sex work in different communities and cultures. In some cases, sex work is linked to tourism, as part of sex tourism.

=== Demographics ===
Transgender people are more likely than the general population to do sex work, particularly trans women and trans people of color. In a study of female Indian sex workers, illiteracy and lower social status were more prevalent than among the general female population.

One study of sex work in Tijuana, Mexico, found that the majority of sex workers there are young, female, and heterosexual. Many of these studies attempt to use smaller samples of sex workers and pimps in order to extrapolate about larger populations of sex workers. One report on the underground sex trade in the United States used known data on the illegal drug and weapon trades and interviews with sex workers and pimps in order to draw conclusions about the number of sex workers in eight American cities. However, studies like this one can come under scrutiny for a perceived emphasis on the activities and perspectives of pimps and other sex work managers rather than those of sex work providers themselves. Another criticism is that sex trafficking may not be adequately assessed in relation to sex work in these studies.

Many studies struggle to gain demographic information about the prevalence of sex work, as many countries or cities have laws prohibiting prostitution or other sex work. In addition, sex trafficking, or forced sex work, is also difficult to quantify due to its underground and covert nature. In addition, finding a representative sample of sex workers in a given city can be nearly impossible because the size of the population itself is unknown. Maintaining privacy and confidentiality in research is also difficult because many sex workers may face prosecution and other consequences if their identities are revealed.

== Discrimination ==
Sex workers may be stereotyped as deviant, hypersexual, sexually risky, and substance abusive. Sex workers may cope with this stigmatization in ways such as hiding their occupation from non-sex workers, social withdrawal, and creating a false self to perform at work. Sex-work-related stigma may help perpetuate rape culture and can lead to slut-shaming.

Among sex workers women were found overrepresented compared to gender parity.

Sex work is also often conflated with sex trafficking, despite the fact that most sex workers choose to consensually engage in the sex trade. For example, the Fight Online Sex Trafficking Act in the United States was passed to ostensibly protect victims of sex trafficking but included language making it illegal to advertise consensual sex online. Such laws have a significantly negative impact on sex workers.

Globally, sex workers encounter barriers in accessing health care, legislation, legal resources, and labor rights. In a study of U.S. sex workers, 43% of interview participants reported exposure to intimate partner violence, physical violence, armed physical violence, and sexual violence in the forms of sexual coercion and rape. In this same study, a sex worker reported, "in this lifestyle, nothing's safe". Sex workers may experience police abuse as well, as the police may use their authority to intimidate sex workers. Police officers in some countries have been reported to exploit street-based sex workers' fear of incarceration to force them to have sex with the police without payment, sometimes still arresting them after having coerced sex. Police may also compromise sex workers' safety, often holding sex workers responsible for crimes perpetrated against them because of the stigma attached to their occupation. There is growth in advocacy organizations to reduce and erase prejudice and stigma against sex work, and to provide more support and resources for sex workers.

=== Financial deplatforming ===
Many sex workers experience systemic deplatforming, restriction, or termination of banking and payment processing services to individuals and their businesses. This deplatforming can occur across both the traditional and digital financial institutions and intermediaries.

The modern history of financial deplatforming of sex workers traces back to the early 2010s. In 2013, the United States Department of Justice launched Operation Choke Point, an initiative that pressured banks to cut ties with industries deemed "high risk" for fraud or money laundering. Adult entertainment was also categorized alongside firearm sales and payday loans. This prompted the banks to adopt the policies to reject adult industry clientele to avoid regulatory sanctions. This environment became more complex in 2018 by the passage of the Stop Enabling Sex Traffickers Act and Allow States and Victims to Fight Online Sex Trafficking Act (FOSTA-SESTA). By amending Section 230 of the Communications Decency Act, FOSTA-SESTA made online platforms legally liable if third parties used their services for sex trafficking. To avoid legal trouble, banks and payment companies started closing the accounts of sex workers and adult websites.

== Legal dimensions of sex work ==
World map of legality of prostitution: Decriminalization - No criminal penalties for prostitution Legalization - prostitution legal and regulated Abolitionism - prostitution is legal, but organized activities such as brothels and pimping are illegal; prostitution is not regulated Neo-abolitionism - illegal to buy sex and for 3rd party involvement, legal to sell sex Prohibitionism - prostitution illegal Legality varies with local laws

Depending on local law, sex workers' activities may be regulated, controlled, tolerated, or prohibited. In most countries, even those where sex work is legal, sex workers may be stigmatized and marginalized, which may prevent them from seeking legal redress for discrimination (e.g., racial discrimination by a strip club owner), non-payment by a client, assault or rape. Sex worker advocates have identified this as whorephobia.

The legality of different types of sex work varies within and between regions of the world. For example, while pornography is legal in the United States, prostitution is illegal in most parts of the US. However, in other regions of the world, both pornography and prostitution are illegal; in others, both are legal. One example of a country in which pornography, prostitution, and all professions encompassed under the umbrella of sex work are all legal is New Zealand. Under the Prostitution Reform Act of New Zealand, laws and regulations have been put into place in order to ensure the safety and protection of its sex workers. For example, since the implementation of the Prostitution Reform Act, "any person seeking to open a larger brothel, where more than four sex workers will be working requires a Brothel Operators Certificate, which certifies them as a suitable person to exercise control over sex workers in the workplace. [In addition,] sex workers operating in managed premises have access to labour rights and human rights protection and can pursue claims before the courts, like any other worker or employee." In regions where sex work is illegal, advocates for sex workers' rights argue that the covert nature of illegal prostitution is a barrier to access to legal resources. However, some who oppose the legalization of prostitution argue that sex work is inherently exploitative and can never be legalized or practiced in a way that respects the rights of those who perform it.

There are many arguments against legalizing prostitution/sex work. In one study, women involved in sex work were interviewed and asked if they thought it should be made legal. They answered that they thought it should not, as it would put women at higher risk from violent customers if it were considered legitimate work, and they would not want their friends or family entering the sex industry to earn money. Another argument is that legalizing sex work would increase the demand for it, and women should not be treated as sexual merchandise. A study showed that in countries that have legalized prostitution, there was an increase in human trafficking. The studies also showed that legalizing sex work led to an increase in sex trafficking, which is another reason people give for making sex work illegal. An argument against legalizing sex work is to keep children from being involved in this industry. Children who have been exploited suffer long-term negative consequences.

There are also arguments for legalizing prostitution/sex work. One major argument for legalizing prostitution is that women should have a right to do what they want with their own bodies. The government should not have a say in what they do for work, and if they want to sell their bodies it is their own decision. Another common argument for legalizing prostitution is that enforcing prostitution laws is a waste of money. Some believe prostitution will continue to persist despite whatever laws and regulations are implemented against it. In arguing for the decriminalization of sex work, the Minister of Justice of the Netherlands expanded upon this argument in court when stating that, "prostitution has existed for a long time and will continue to do so…Prohibition is not the way to proceed…One should allow for voluntary prostitution. The authorities can then regulate prostitution, [and] it can become healthy, safe, transparent, and cleansed from criminal side-effects." People who wish to legalize prostitution do not see enforcing laws against sex work as effective and think the money is better spent elsewhere. Many people also argue that legalization of prostitution will lead to less harm for the sex workers. They argue that the decriminalization of sex work will decrease the exploitation of sex workers by third parties such as pimps and managers. A final argument for the legalization of sex work is that prostitution laws are unconstitutional. Some argue that these laws go against people's rights to free speech and privacy.

== Risk reduction ==
Risk reduction in sex work is a highly debated topic. "Abolitionism" and "nonabolitionism" or "empowerment" are regarded as opposing ways in which risk reduction is approached. While abolitionism would call for an end to all sex work, empowerment would encourage the formation of networks among sex workers and enable them to prevent STIs and other health risks by communicating with each other. Both approaches aim to reduce rates of disease and other negative effects of sex work.

In addition, sex workers themselves have disputed the dichotomous nature of abolitionism and nonabolitionism, advocating instead a focus on sex workers' rights. In 1999, the Network of Sex Worker Projects claimed that historically, anti-trafficking measures have been more concerned with protecting 'innocent' women from becoming prostitutes than with ensuring the human rights of those in the sex industry. Penelope Saunders, a sex workers' rights advocate, claims that the sex workers' rights approach considers more of the historical context of sex work than either abolitionism or empowerment. In addition, Jo Doezema has written that the dichotomy of the voluntary and forced approaches to sex work has served to deny sex workers agency.

=== Health ===
Sex workers are unlikely to disclose their work to healthcare providers. This can be due to embarrassment, fear of disapproval, or a disbelief that sex work can have effects on their health. The criminalization of sex work in many places can also lead to a reluctance to disclose for fear of being turned in for illegal activities. There are very few legal protections for sex workers due to criminalization; thus, in many cases, a sex worker reporting violence to a healthcare provider may not be able to take legal action against their aggressor.

Health risks of sex work relate primarily to sexually transmitted infections and to drug use. In one study, nearly 40% of sex workers who visited a health center reported illegal drug use. In general, transgender women sex workers have a higher risk of contracting HIV than cisgender male and female sex workers and transgender women who are not sex workers.

The reason transgender women are at higher risk for developing HIV is their combination of risk factors. They face biological, personal, relational, and structural risks that all increase their chances of getting HIV. Biological factors include incorrect condom usage because of erectile dysfunction from hormones taken to become more feminine and receptive anal intercourse without a condom which is a high risk for developing HIV. Personal factors include mental health issues that lead to increased sexual risk, such as anxiety, depression, and substance abuse provoked through lack of support, violence, etc. Structural risks include involvement in sex work being linked to poverty, substance abuse, and other factors that are more prevalent in transgender women based on their tendency to be socially marginalized and not accepted for challenging gender norms. The largest risk for HIV is unprotected sex with male partners, and studies have been emerging that show men who have sex with transgender women are more likely to use drugs than men that do not.

Condom use is one way to mitigate the risk of contracting an STI. However, negotiating condom use with one's clients and partners is often an obstacle to practicing safer sex. While there is not much data on rates of violence against sex workers, many sex workers do not use condoms due to the fear of resistance and violence from clients. Some countries also have laws prohibiting condom possession; this reduces the likelihood that sex workers will use condoms. Increased organization and networking among sex workers has been shown to increase condom use by increasing access to and education about STI prevention. Brothels with strong workplace health practices, including the availability of condoms, have also increased condom use among their workers.

==== Health concerns of exotic dancers ====
In order to protect themselves from the stigma of sex work, many dancers resort to othering themselves. Othering involves constructing oneself as superior to one's peers, and the dancer persona provides an internal boundary that separates the "authentic" from the stripper self. This practice creates a significant amount of stress for the dancers, in turn leading many to resort to using drugs and alcohol to cope. Since it is so widespread, the use of drugs has become normalized in the exotic dance scene.

Despite this normalization, passing as nonusers, or covering as users of less maligned drugs, is necessary. This is because strippers concurrently attribute a strong moral constitution to those that resist the drug atmosphere; it is a testament to personal strength and willpower. It is also an occasion for dancers to "other" fellow strippers. Valorizing resistance to the drug space discursively positions "good" strippers against such a drug locale and indicates why dancers are motivated to closet hard drug use.

Stigma causes strippers to hide their lifestyles from friends and family alienating themselves from a support system. Further, the stress of trying to hide their lifestyles from others due to fear of scrutiny affects the mental health of dancers.

=== Forced sex work ===
Forced sex work is when an individual enters into any sex trade due to coercion rather than by choice. Forced sex work increases the likelihood that a sex worker will contract HIV/AIDS or another sexually transmitted infection, particularly when an individual enters sex work before the age of 18. In addition, even when sex workers do consent to certain sex acts, they are often forced or coerced into others (often anal intercourse) by clients. Sex workers may also experience strong resistance to condom use by their clients, which may extend into a lack of consent by the worker to any sexual act performed in the encounter; this risk is magnified when sex workers are trafficked or forced into sex work.

Forced sex work often involves deception - workers are told that they can make a living and are then not allowed to leave. This deception can cause ill effects on the mental health of many sex workers. In addition, an assessment of studies estimates that between 40% and 70% of sex workers face violence within a year. Currently, there is little support for migrant workers in many countries, including those who have been trafficked to a location for sex.

== Advocacy ==
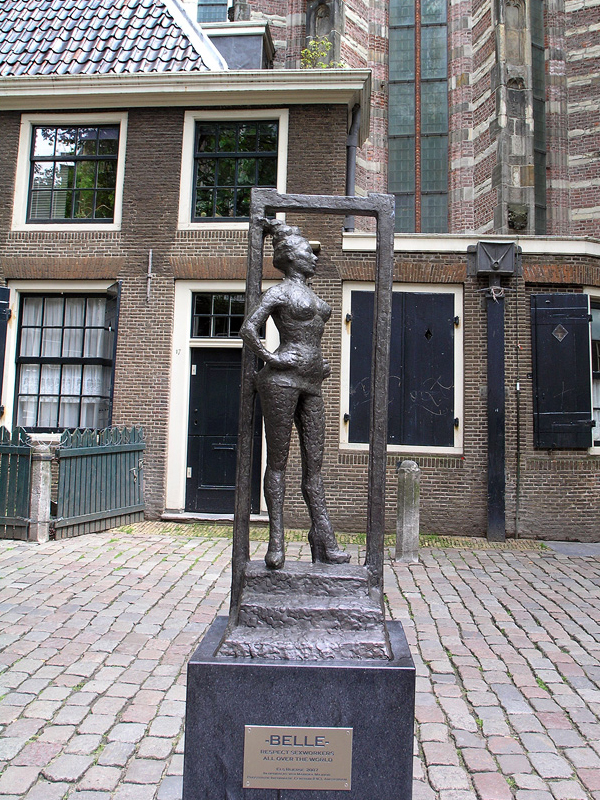
Bronze statue Belle in Amsterdam's red-light district De Wallen reads "Respect sex workers all over the world".

Sex worker's rights advocates argue that sex workers should have the same basic human and labor rights as other working people. For example, the Canadian Guild for Erotic Labour calls for the legalization of sex work, the elimination of state regulations that are more repressive than those imposed on other workers and businesses, the right to recognition and protection under labour and employment laws, the right to form and join professional associations or unions, and the right to legally cross borders to work. Advocates also want to see changes in legal practices involving sex work, the Red Umbrella Project has pushed for the decriminalization of condoms and changes to New York's sex workers diversion program. Advocacy for the interests of sex workers can come from a variety of sources, including non-governmental organizations, labor rights organizations, governments, or sex workers themselves. In Latin America and the Caribbean, sex worker advocacy dates back to the late 19th century in Havana, Cuba. A catalyst in the movement being a newspaper published by Havana sex workers. This publication went by the name La Cebolla, created by Las Horizontales. Each year in London, The Sexual Freedom Awards is held to honor the most notable advocates and pioneers of sexual freedom and sex workers' rights in the UK, where sex work is essentially legal.

=== Unionization of sex work ===
The unionization of sex workers is a recent development. The first organization within the contemporary sex workers' rights movement was Call Off Your Old Tired Ethics (COYOTE), founded in 1973 in San Francisco, California. Many organizations in Western countries were established in the decade after the founding of COYOTE. Currently, a small number of sex worker unions exist worldwide. One of the largest is the International Union of Sex Workers, headquartered in the United Kingdom. The IUSW advocates for the rights of all sex workers, whether they chose freely or were coerced to enter the trade, and promotes policies that benefit the interests of sex workers both in the UK and abroad. Many regions are home to sex worker unions, including Latin America, Brazil, Canada, Europe, and Africa.

In unionizing, many sex workers face issues relating to communication and to the legality of sex work. Because sex work is illegal in many places where they wish to organize, it is difficult to communicate with other sex workers in order to organize. There is also concern with the legitimacy of sex work as a career and an activity that merits formal organizing, largely because of the sexism often present in sex work and the devaluation of sex work as not comparable to other paid labor and employment.

A factor affecting the unionization of sex work is that many sex workers belong to populations that historically have not had a strong representation in labor unions. While this unionization can be viewed as a way of empowering sex workers and granting them agency within their profession, it is also criticized as implicitly lending its approval to sexism and power imbalances already present in sex work. Unionization also implies a submission to or operation within the systems of capitalism, which is of concern to some feminists.

==== Unionizing exotic dancers ====
Exotic dancers in general are problematic to categorize because they often exercise a high level of control over their work product, one characteristic of an independent contractor. Additionally, their work can be artistic in nature and often done on a freelance basis. Often, the work of performers does not possess the obvious attributes of employees such as regular working hours, places, or duties. Consequently, employers misclassify them because they are unsure of their workers' status, or they purposely misclassify them to take advantage of independent contractors' low costs. Exotic dance clubs are one such employer that purposely misclassifies their performers as independent contractors.

There are additional hurdles in terms of self-esteem and commitment to unionize. On the most basic level, dancers themselves must have the desire to unionize for collective action. For those who wish not to conform to group activity or want to remain independent, a union may seem as controlling as club management since joining a union would obligate them to pay dues and abide by decisions made through majority vote, with or without their personal approval.

In the Lusty Lady case study, this strip club was the first all-woman-managed club to successfully unionize in 1996. Some of the working conditions they were able to address included "protest[ing] racist hiring practices, customers being allowed to videotape dancers without their consent via one-way mirrors, inconsistent disciplinary policies, lack of health benefits, and an overall dearth of job security". Unionizing exotic dancers can certainly bring better work conditions and fair pay, but it is difficult to do at times because of their dubious employee categorization. Also, as is the case with many other unions, dancers are often reluctant to join them. This reluctance can be due to many factors, ranging from the cost of joining a union to the dancers believing they do not need union support because they will not be exotic dancers for a long enough period of time to justify joining a union.

=== Non-governmental organizations (NGOs) ===
NGOs often play a large role in outreach to sex workers, particularly in HIV and STI prevention efforts. However, NGO outreach to sex workers for HIV prevention is sometimes less coordinated and organized than similar HIV prevention programs targeted at different groups (such as men who have sex with men). This lack of organization may be due to the legal status of prostitution and other sex work in the country in question; in China, many sex work and drug abuse NGOs do not formally register with the government and thus run many of their programs on a small scale and discreetly.

While some NGOs have increased their programming to improve conditions within the context of sex work, these programs are criticized at times due to their failure to dismantle the oppressive structures of prostitution, particularly forced trafficking. Some scholars believe that advocating for rights within the institution of prostitution is not enough; rather, programs that seek to empower sex workers must empower them to leave sex work as well as improve their rights within the context of sex work.

== See also ==
- A Vindication of the Rights of Whores
- Dominatrix
- Feminist sex wars
- International Sex Workers' Day
- List of sex worker organizations
- Prostitution statistics by country
- Revolting Prostitutes
- Sex-positive feminism
- Sex worker movements
- Sugar baby
- The Sexual Freedom Awards (UK)
- Transgender sex workers
- World Charter for Prostitutes' Rights
