= Anna-Louise Crago =

Canadian activist

Anna-Louise Crago is a Canadian activist, researcher and author in the field of Sex workers' rights. She has also researched violence and other human rights abuses against sex workers, the homeless and drug addicts in more than 25 countries. Crago is a former sex worker, and has had several works published.

== Sex work and activism ==
Crago worker as a prostitute for several years on the streets in Montréal, and in indoor locations in Montréal, Gatineau, Toronto and Niagara Falls. She joined Stella, l’amie de Maimie, a Montréal organisation run by, and for, sex workers, later becoming their coordinator of health, legal and social services. She was part of the team that received the AIDS Action Award in 2006, awarded by the NGO Human Rights Watch and leading advocacy organization, Canadian HIV/AIDS Legal Network.

She spoke out strongly against the Prostitution Bill (Bill C-36) proposed by the Stephen Harper government, including attending protests and making a written submission to the Senate of Canada. Since the bill passed into law Crago has campaigned for its repeal. She also campaigns for decriminalizing sex work globally.

== Higher education, research and works ==
Crago received a BFA in 2003 and an MA in 2010, both from Concordia University in Montreal. She was granted a Trudeau Foundation Scholarship in 2013 to pursue research on the experience of sex workers during armed conflict in the Democratic Republic of the Congo. She is currently a PhD candidate and Trudeau scholar at the University of Toronto, researching sex work, violence and law and policy.

In 2009 Crago co-ordinated and was the lead author in research organised the Sex Workers' Rights Advocacy Network to study police violence against sex workers in Europe and Central Asia.

Crago was involved as an expert during the 2012 preparation of the World Health Organization's Recommendations for Female, Male and Transgender Sex Workers.

The Lancet produced a special issue for the XX International AIDS Conference, 2014. Crago was the co-editor and also co-author of the article An action agenda for HIV and sex workers and co-author of Human rights violations against sex workers: burden and effect on HIV, both articles appearing in this edition.

== Awards ==
- 2006 AIDS Action Award (co-recipient)
- 2016 Canadian Governor General’s Award for advancing sex workers’ human rights and gender equality.

== Selected works ==
- "Queer & Young & So Much Else". Canadian Woman Studies. 16 (2): 15–17. 1 April 1996. ISSN 0713-3235.
- "Rights Not Rescue: A Report on Female, Trans, and Male Sex Workers' Human Rights in Botswana, Namibia, and South Africa". Open Society Foundations. 2008. co-author Jayne Arnott
- "Our Lives Matter: Sex Workers Unite for Health and Rights". Open Society Foundations. 2008.
- "Arrest the Violence: Human Rights Violations Against Sex Workers in 11 Countries in Central and Eastern Europe and Central Asia". Sex Workers' Rights Advocacy Network. 2009.
- Ne dans le Redlight: The Sex Workers' Movement in Montreal in Meulen, Emily Van der; Durisin, Elya M.; Love, Victoria, eds. (2013). Selling Sex: Experience, Advocacy, and Research on Sex Work in Canada. UBC Press. ISBN 9780774824484. co-author: Jenn Clamen
- Beyrer, Chris; Crago, Anna-Louise; Bekker, Linda-Gail; Butler, Jenny; Shannon, Kate; Kerrigan, Deanna; Decker, Michele R.; Baral, Stefan D.; Poteat, Tonia; Wirtz, Andrea L.; Weir, Brian W.; Barré-Sinoussi, Françoise; Kazatchkine, Michel; Sidibé, Michel; Dehne, Karl-Lorenz; Boily, Marie-Claude; Strathdee, Steffanie A. (21 July 2014). "An action agenda for HIV and sex workers". The Lancet. 385 (9964): 287–301. doi:10.1016/S0140-6736(14)60933-8. ISSN 0140-6736. PMC 4302059. PMID 25059950. co-authors: Prof Chris Beyrer, MD, Prof Linda-Gail Bekker, PhD et al.
- Decker, Michele R.; Crago, Anna-Louise; Chu, Sandra K H.; Sherman, Susan G.; Seshu, Meena S.; Buthelezi, Kholi; Dhaliwal, Mandeep; Beyrer, Chris (21 July 2014). "Human rights violations against sex workers: burden and effect on HIV". The Lancet. 385 (9963): 186–199. doi:10.1016/S0140-6736(14)60800-X. ISSN 0140-6736. PMC 4454473. PMID 25059943. co-authors Dr Michele R Decker, ScD, Sandra K H Chu, LLM et al.
- Crago, Anna-Louise (2014). ""Bitches Killing the Nation": Analyzing the Violent State-Sponsored Repression of Sex Workers in Zambia, 2004–2008". Signs: Journal of Women in Culture and Society. 39 (2): 365–381. doi:10.1086/673087. ISSN 0097-9740. JSTOR 10.1086/673087. S2CID 147278016.
