= Sex worker movements =

Social movement to address issues in sex work

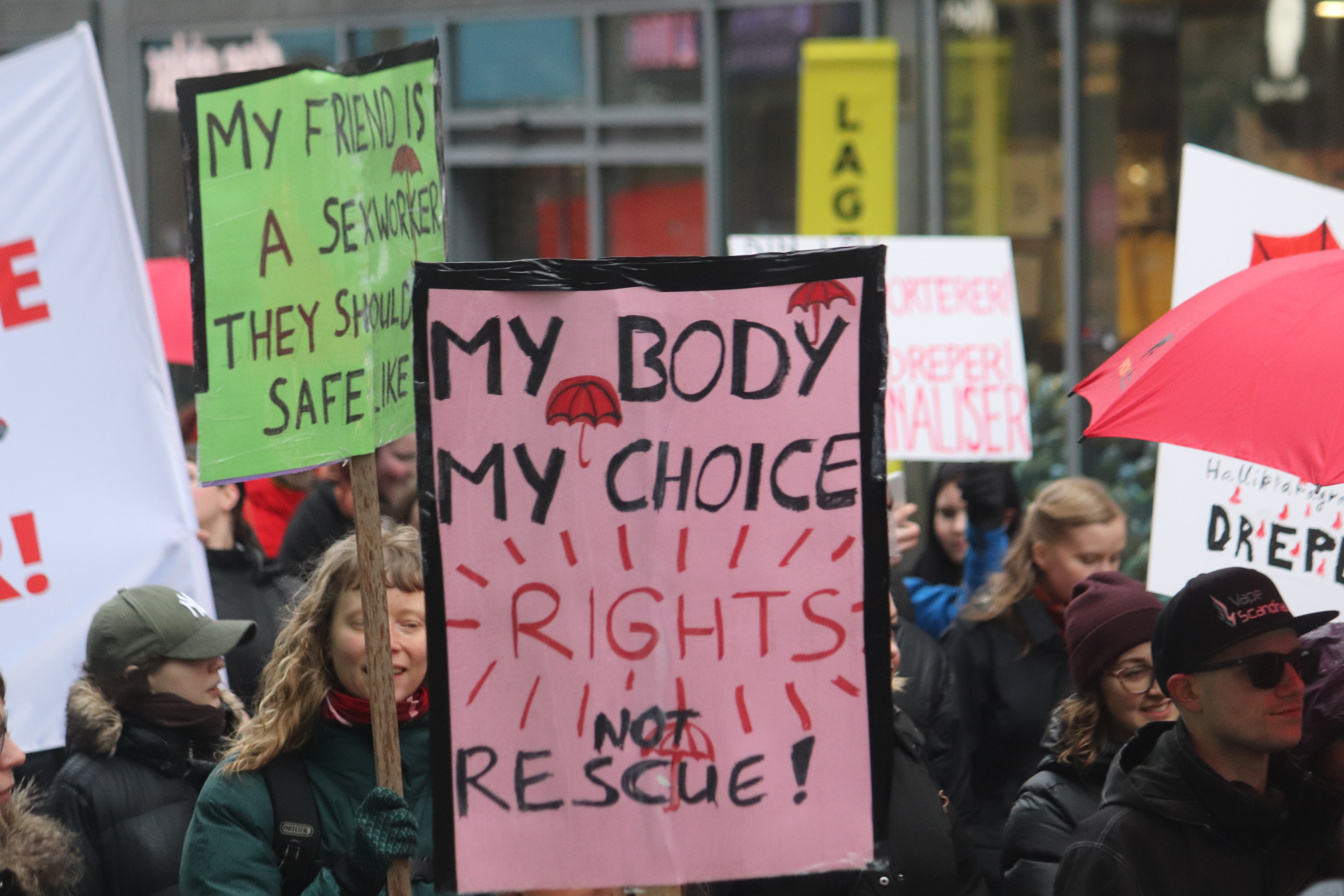
Women's Day 2020 signage

Sex worker movements address issues of labor rights, gender-related violence, social stigma, migration, access to health care, criminalization, and police violence and have evolved to address local conditions and historical challenges. Although accounts of sex work dates back to antiquity, movements organized to defend sex workers' rights are understood as a more recent phenomenon. While contemporary sex worker rights movements are generally associated with the feminist movement of the 1970s and 1980s in Europe and North America, the first recorded sex worker organization, Las Horizontales began in 1888 in Havana, Cuba.

An important moment in that movement was the shift from using the term prostitution to using the term sex work to emphasize their role as workers. The term, coined by Carol Leigh and Margo St. James, played an influential role in the sex worker movement in the U.S. and abroad. Sex work as a political issues has been a source of considerable debate within feminist movement.

The onset of the HIV/AIDS epidemic in the 1980s framed sex work as a public health issue and led some state organizations and community groups to work more closely with sex worker organizations in HIV/AIDS prevention efforts.

== Global and distributed efforts ==
The First World Whores' Congress which met on 14 February 1985, in Amsterdam, served as the impetus for the creation of the International Committee for Prostitutes Rights (ICPR). It included sex worker representatives from the Netherlands, France, Switzerland, Germany, England, Sweden, the United States, and Canada and sex worker advocates from Singapore, Thailand, and Vietnam. Translation was provided into Dutch, English, French, German, and English.

The International Day to End Violence Against Sex Workers is an international day of action to protest the violence leveled against sex workers around the world. First observed in 2003, it was organized by Annie Sprinkle and Robyn Few, founder of the Sex Worker Outreach Project (SWOP). It is observed annually on 17 December.

Red Umbrella Marches, sometimes referred to as Sex Worker Pride marches, began in 2001 as part of the 49th Venice Biennale of Art. The action was initiated by the Slovenian artist Tadej Pgacar and sex workers who created a living installation they titled Prostitute Pavilion. Sex Worker Pride is observed on 14 September.

Another day associated with sex workers' rights is 3 March, International Sex Workers' Rights Day. Durbar Mahila Samanwaya Committee, a Calcutta-based group that has over 50,000 sex worker members, and members of their communities. Sex worker groups across the world have subsequently celebrated 3 March as International Sex Workers' Rights Day.

The International Committee for Prostitutes Rights changes its name to International International Committee for Sex Workers in Europe (ICRSE), and more recently changed it again to European Sex Workers' Rights Alliance.

Sex workers have engaged the arts and publishing internationally as a means to bring attention to their own stories, experiences, and perspectives. They have published memoirs, poetry collections, self-help guides, and mixed genre edited volumes. They have also organized arts and film festivals in Berlin, London, San Francisco, and elsewhere. Sex workers have also produced guides that detail best practices for teaching and writing about sex worker in academia and which provide exhaustive bibliography on the subject; best practice guides for providing services to those working in healthcare; and tips and strategies for those wishing to support through legal efforts and organizing.

== Africa ==
While sex worker movements have been most active in South Africa, other sex worker communities across the African continent have also taken action to promote their rights and combat issues such as police abuse and the spread of HIV/AIDS. Cameroonian sex workers protested police mistreatment through a strike in 2007, while sex workers in Zambia formed a union to address the concerning rates of HIV/AIDS in their community. Sex workers in Kenya created the Commercial Sex Workers Association to regulate their work, The Association of Women at Risk from AIDS, a prominent organization advocating for the rights of sex workers in Senegal, was founded in 1993 during an AIDS prevention campaign in Dakar and the Platform layalat advocate for the rights of trans sex workers in Morocco

=== South Africa ===
People calling for the full decriminalisation of sex work in South Africa in 2019
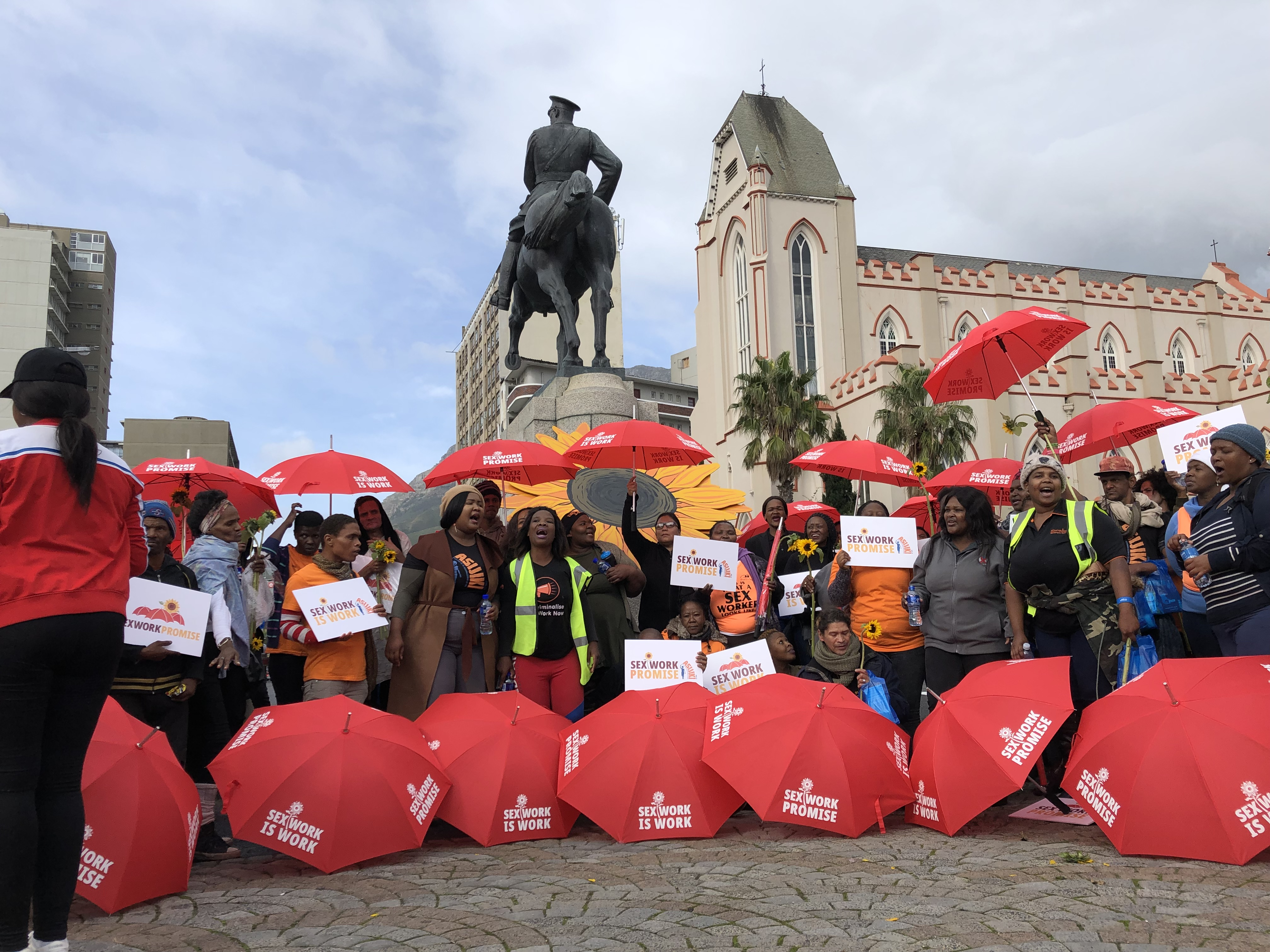
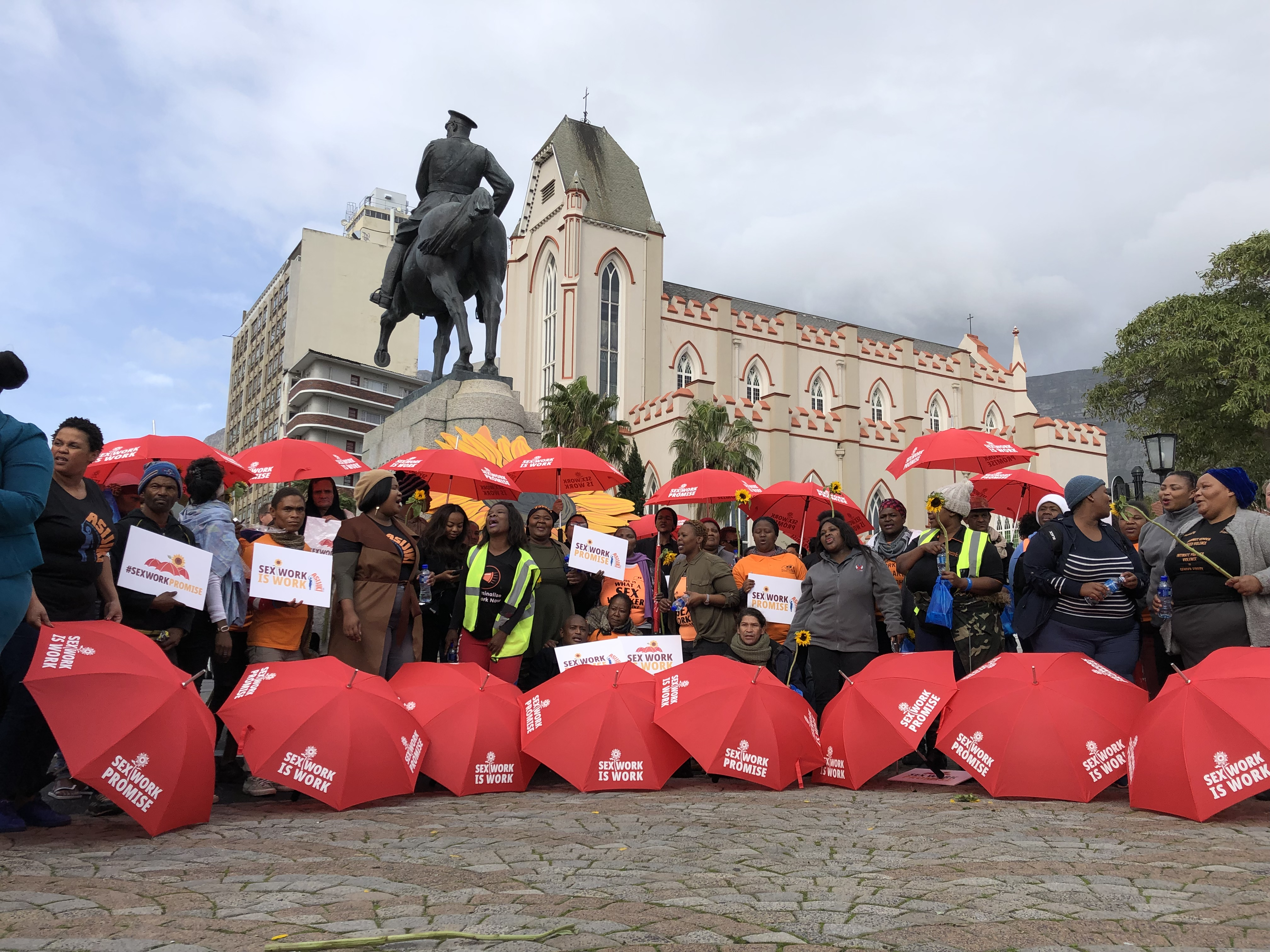

Sex Workers Education and Advocacy Task Force (SWEAT) is the first sex workers' rights organization founded in southern Africa. Established in November 1994 in Cape Town, South Africa, SWEAT is considered by scholars as the most well-known sex worker movement on the African continent.

SWEAT was originally associated with the Triangle Project, a South African LGBTQ+ rights organization, until 1996 when SWEAT advocates recognized a need for a human rights approach in providing services and assistance to sex workerss. Upon separation, SWEAT's work began to provide sex workers with services such as health care, legal assistance, counseling, and training programs. They also engage in advocacy efforts to promote the rights of sex workers, including advocating for policy and legal reforms to protect the health and human rights of sex workers.

At a 2003 SWEAT conference in Cape Town, Sisonke, a sex worker-led movement, was founded in response to the lack of sex worker leadership in SWEAT. Sisonke's members work to empower and educate sex workers, and to advocate for policy and legal reforms that promote the health, safety, and human rights of sex workers in South Africa. SWEAT continues to provide support and assistance to Sisonke and other sex worker-led organizations through health and human rights trainings in their efforts to promote sex worker rights in South Africa.

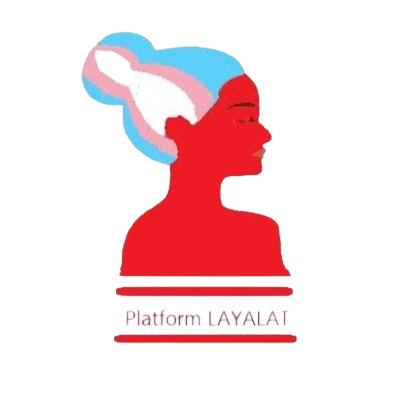
Platform LAYALAT: / Sex work led organisation; Founder / Anya Dahan; Region / Africa; Location / Morocco; Focus / Trans sex workers rights; Twitter / @platformlayalat; Global Network / Member of NSWP; Website / www.layalat.org

=== Morocco ===
Transgender women sex workers in Morocco have been at the forefront of advocating for the rights and recognition of both status: recognition of sex worker as work and legal recognition of transgender status. One prominent figure in this movement is Anya Dahan, a transgender woman and the founder and coordinator of Platform Layalat, a feminist network of trans women sex workers in Morocco, member of the global network of sex work projects.

Through their activism, Anya and the members of Platform Layalat have been working towards challenging stigma, improving health services, and fighting for the rights of sex workers in the country.

=== Kenya ===
Health Options for Young Men on HIV/AIDS/STI (HOYMAS), a community-based organization registered by the Ministry of Social Services and Gender, was established in Nairobi, Kenya in 2009 by a group of male sex workers living with HIV/AIDS. The organization's primary objective is to promote human rights through police sensitization training, paralegal training, community education, and advocacy for sex workers' rights. HOYMAS conducts community outreach programs, such as health talks, mobilization, prevention, care and treatment, and economic empowerment.

On 11 September 2015, HOYMAS made history by launching Africa's first savings and credit scheme (SACCO) registered by male sex workers. This initiative was created to enable the organization to access financial resources, including small loans. The SACCO was composed of HOYMAS members who had received training on economic empowerment, finance, and savings from SMEP, a micro-finance institution, and the Kenya Cooperative Bank Ltd, who also assisted them to register the scheme.

== Asia ==
Asia's location as the site of international conflict including wars in Vietnam, Korea, and Japan have contributed to the prevalence of sex workers in the region. Organizing efforts started locally with one of the first documented organizations being EMPOWER Foundation in Thailand in 1985.

By the 1990s, sex workers in Asia began to formally organize to advocate for the decriminalization and legalization of sex work alongside providing assistance to workers. Most of the organizations were locally based and provided resources to sex workers in their regional languages. Regional organizations such as the Asia Pacific Network of Sex Workers (APNSW) and Sex Workers and Allies South Asia (SWASA) have worked independently and collaboratively to promote the health, safety, and human rights of sex workers in the Asia Pacific and South Asia regions, respectively.

=== Thailand ===
Founded in September 2004 in Bangkok, Thailand, Service Workers IN Group (SWING) is a Thai sex worker organization that seeks to offer services and resources to male, female, and transgender sex workers.

SWING evolved from the EMPOWER Foundation, a national Thai sex worker network, in order to provide services and assistance to male and transgender sex workers who were not included in the national and civil society response to HIV/AIDS.

Since its founding, SWING has expanded to offer services and assistance to female sex workers as well. SWING has drop-in spaces and offices in Bangkok, Koh Samui, and Pattaya, all of which are considered Thailand's most infamous red-light districts. At each location, SWING offers core services such as care and support programs for HIV-positive sex workers and English language classes.

In response to the COVID-19 pandemic, SWING extended additional support to sex workers who were struggling financially due to a lack of work opportunities and were not eligible for government health care or financial benefits, as sex work is still considered illegal in Thailand. To address the issue, SWING began distributing pre-prepared food bags and providing free HIV and syphilis testing through their mobile testing trucks. Moreover, SWING received financial assistance from the Australian Embassy's Direct Aid Program (DAP) to create and deliver 1,200 survival bags to sex workers in Pattaya.

=== India ===
Durbar Mahila Samanwaya Committee was a group started in 1995 as a forum for sex workers in Kolkata and was created out of an HIV prevention group, Sonagachi Project in the red light district of the city. In 1999, they took over control of the All India Institute of Hygiene and Public Health to promote the health, safety, and legal rights of sex workers. They have organized marches, run clinics, adult literacy centers, residential homes for children of sex workers, created libraries, and developed a wing of the organization that supports creative expression through dance, music, and visual arts; and runs a micro-credit program.

In 2007, a union called Karnataka Sex Workers Union, KSWU, began to extend rights to sex workers in the same way any other workers in a field of work acquire rights. With this union, they have been able to help other work fields that are associated with a risk of being sexually assaulted and whose members wish to be able to have their voice and not be treated as any different. The long term goal is to decriminalize sex work in India. So far, they have been able to provide access to healthcare, help children of sex workers not be looked at differently and receive an education that can help them start a career. They have also been able to provide mental health support and seminars on subjects such as safety while working and legal rights.

== Australia ==
The history of the Australian Prostitutes Collective (APC) and the role they played in decriminalizing sex work is documented by sex worker scholar and activist Eurydice Aroney in the TikiTok digital history project entitled "Whore Laws of Yore: How New South Wales Decriminalized Sex Work: 1979-1995" The series documents the central role that sex workers played in the decades long struggle to decriminalize sex work and highlights the role the Australian Prostitutes Collective (APC) played in that legal victory.

In March 2015, a sex worker from Australia Tilly Lawless posted a picture on social media with a #FacesOfProstitution in her caption. This inspired other sex workers to use the same hashtag in a regular picture of their day to day life. With this hashtag it helped sex workers believe that they are more than what they are labeled and at the end of the day they're just human beings the same as anyone else. They deserve the rights any other person has and shouldn't be ashamed of who they are and try to hide who they are in the public eye. In 2021 Tilly Lawless published her book "Nothing But My Body", which goes over her point of view of sex working in a fictional way. In her book she talks about the sisterhood you develop with other sex workers and looking out for each other due to dangers there is in this line of work.

== Europe ==
While there are numerous instances of individual acts of protests throughout Europe, the start of sex worker activism in Europe is generally attributed to the events of 1975 that led to the occupation of the Église Saint-Nizier in Lyon. However, a previous attempt to organize sex workers in Lyon had occurred earlier in 1972.

=== France ===
In August 1972, local politicians and police officers in Lyon, France were charged with corruption and procurement following anonymous complaints. The scandal implicated a Member of Parliament and revealed that many hotel owners were paying bribes to police in exchange for ignoring the fact that their hotels were being used as brothels. Brothels were legal in Frances since 1946 but were subject to strict regulation. As a result of the scandal, the estimated 400 sex workers in Lyon were no longer able to work in hotels, which had previously provided them with safer working conditions.

On 24 August, sex workers in Lyon planned a protest to call for safe working conditions, but the protest only attracted 30 sex workers who were willing to attend. The press reported the planned protest sarcastically, belittling the mobilizing efforts of the sex workers and attracting a crowd of onlookers and voyeurs. The police mocked the sex workers and sent them to the police station for arrest where they were held for several hours.

Following the events, the Lyon police took a harsher approach, resulting in increased repression and damage to the relationship between the police and sex workers. Sex workers felt outraged by the treatment they received and were unable to mobilize effectively in Lyon until 1975.

On 2 June 1975, sex workers in Lyon occupied the Saint-Nizier Church to draw attention to their "inhumane" working conditions, churches being considered a space of asylum for the marginalized and dispossessed. The occupation lasted ten days until the women were removed by the police. Sympathetic occupations of churches by prostitutes followed in other French cities. Although the protest was deemed a failure, it has been argued that it was the event that consolidated the movement by forging a collective identity and shifting public attitudes. The date is commemorated as International Whores' Day and is observed annually on 2 June of each year.

=== Italy ===
In September 1973, a group of sex workers in Rome established a group, "Partito per la Protezione delle Prostitute-PPP" to safeguard the rights of sex workers. The organization saw itself as a labor union that aimed to oppose the criminalization of sex work and promote social and pension benefits for sex workers. In 1974, the PPP initiated legal action against the Minister of Interior for the illegal registration of sex workers and against the Chief of Police for their failure to crack down on "pimps."

The group Comitato per i Diritti Civili delle Prostitute (Committee for the Civil Rights of Prostitutes), or CDCP, was formed in 1983 by the sex worker activists Carla Corso and Pia Covre to promote the labor rights of sex workers.

=== Germany ===
Sex worker demonstration in Berlin, October 2015 - "sex work no stigma"
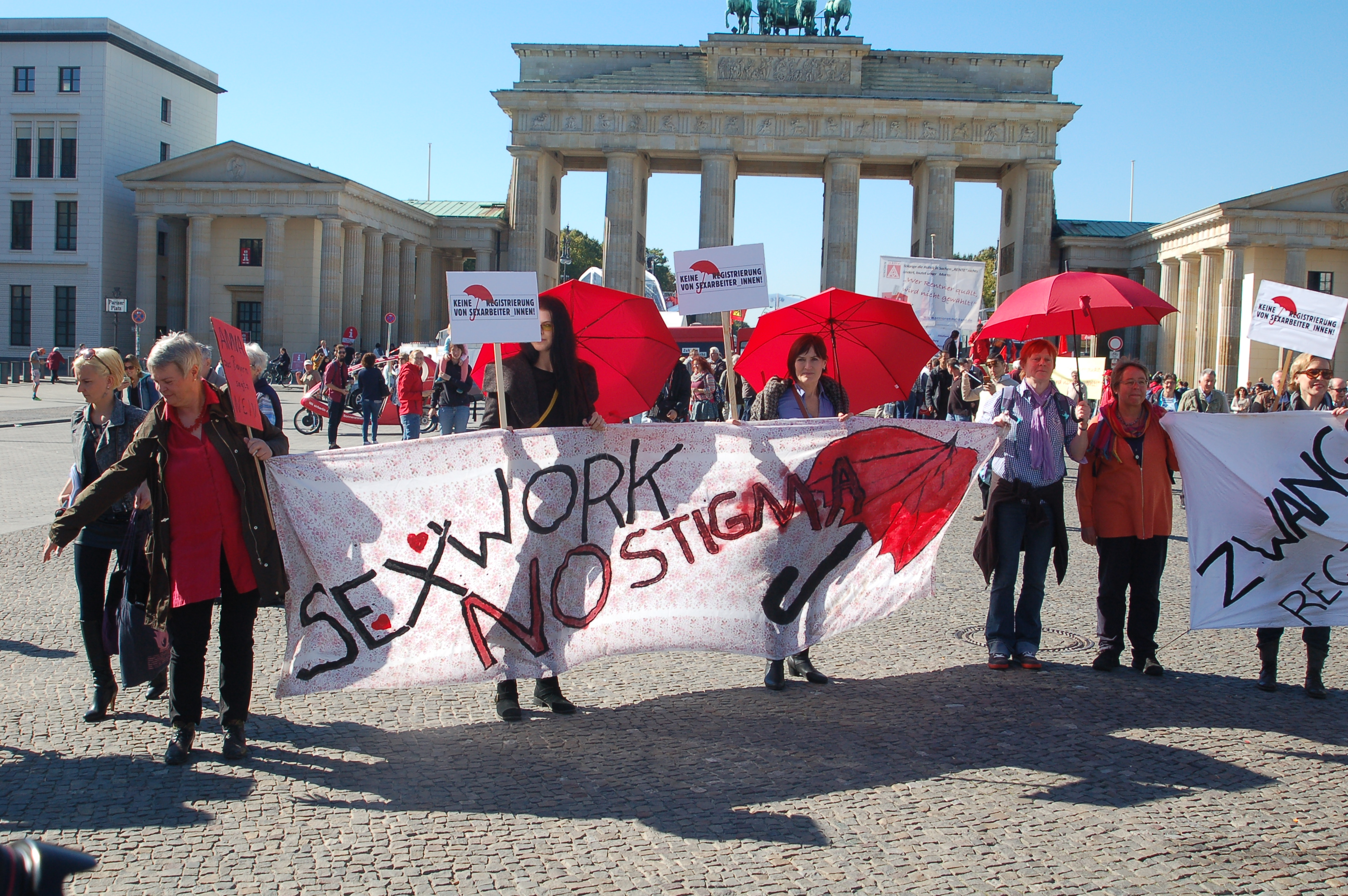
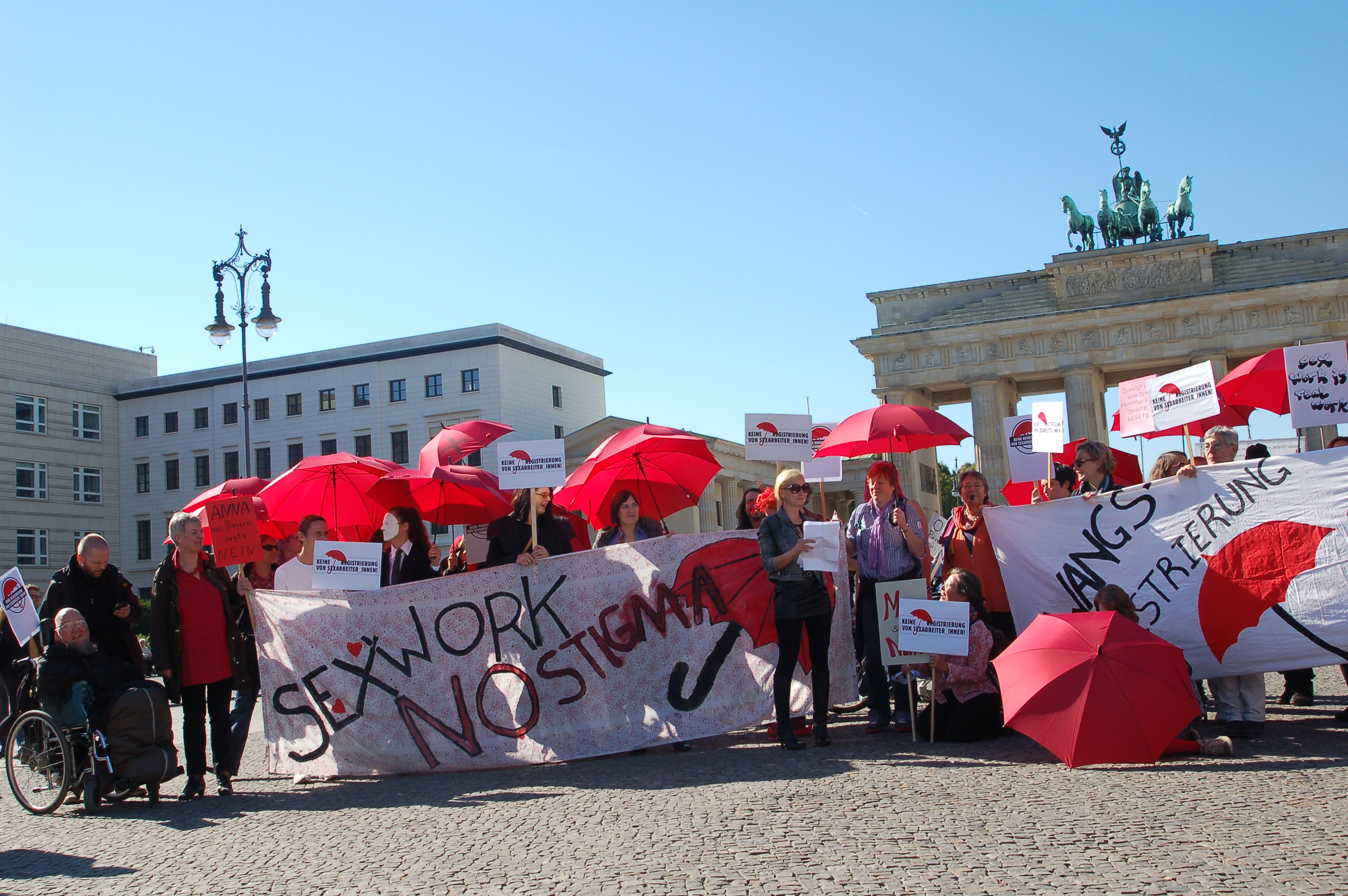

In October 2013, Johanna Weber created the first professional association for sex workers in Germany to promote the rights of sex workers after the 2001 German law allowed them to register as workers eligible of receiving social insurance. The organization is called the Professional Association of Erotic and Sexual Services. Its primary focus is educating the public about the differences between human trafficking and consensual adult sex work.

=== Regional network ===
European Sex Workers Rights Alliance - ESWA (formerly ICRSE) is a European network of sex workers and allies across Europe and Central Asia.

== Latin America and the Caribbean ==
Official Illustrated Newspaper of La Cebolla; 23 September 1888

In Latin America and the Caribbean sex worker movements date back to the late 19th century in Havana, Cuba. A catalyst in the movement being a newspaper published by Havana sex workers. This publication went by the name La Cebolla, created by Las Horizontales.

Researchers report that in the 1900s, many immigrants arriving in Latin America and the Caribbean from Europe, Asia, and North America were engaged in sexual labor. Even though sex work was part of larger movements for industrialization in Latin America, and Cuba is the site of the first sex worker organization in the world, sex workers in the region did not begin to organize themselves as workers or to demand equal rights until the 1970s.

During periods of industrialization, various Latin American countries recognized sex tourism as a new industry, bringing in millions of dollars through sex shops, live sex shows, clubs, exotic dancing, and escorts services. However, sex work continues to be stigmatized in the region with various laws, zoning restrictions, and local regulations installed to prohibit sexual commerce. The demand for sex work shows no signs of slowing down, therefore many Latin American sex workers continue to fight for political visibility, legalization, and basic human rights protections and numerous sex worker organizations have been started in the region.

Latin America serves as one of the leading forces for achieving change in the sex industry, though this is often overlooked in analyses of sex worker movements and organizing. Sex workers from Latin America were also active in other parts of the world, particularly North America and Europe. By the 1970s, 30 to 60 percent of prostitutes in Europe came from developing countries. Latin American sex workers have also written about their experiences of migration, the transgender activist Alexandra R. DeRuiz published a memoir entitled Crucé la Frontera en Tacones which chronicles the issues of transphobia women who migrate, including their experiences with sex work.

The start of the sex worker rights movement can be traced back to the late 1970s. One of the oldest and most influential organizations in Latin America is the Red de Mujeres Trabajadores Sexuales de Latino America Y El Caribe (Women's Network of Sex Workers of Latin America and the Caribbean), also known as RedTraSex. Started in 1997, RedTraSex is a prime example of transnational cooperative efforts that mobilize sex workers in multiple Latin American countries. With a total of 15 countries represented, these women have directed their efforts to focus on sex worker visibility, to have their voices heard in political spaces, and to work towards the decriminalization of their profession. In addition, many also provide support services and referrals to local resources to help individuals survive within this sphere.

In 2021, during the Coronavirus pandemic in Mexico many the amount of sex workers nearly doubled in numbers due to some losing their jobs and not being able to afford resources for their families. Many of these sex workers that were seen were sex workers that had already moved on in their life and stopped working in this field. There were also some people that turned into becoming sex workers but were ashamed of themselves so they would not consider themselves as sex workers since it was only temporary. The government did give some housing for sex workers that were sleeping in the street but most funds came from organizations that support sex worker movements. Many of these people were concerned for their health since they did not have the resources and money for themselves they would not be able to afford healthcare if they were to get sick from coronavirus or sexually transmitted diseases.

=== Migration ===
Sex workers from Latin America have also activated for sex worker rights in other parts of the world, particularly North America and Europe, focusing on the unique challenges impacting those who migrate to work. By the 1970s, 30 to 60 percent of prostitutes in Europe came from developing countries. Latin American sex workers have also written about their experiences of migration, the transgender activist Alexandra R. DeRuiz published a memoir entitled Crucé la Frontera en Tacones which chronicles the issues of transphobia women who migrate, including their experiences with sex work.

=== RedTraSex ===
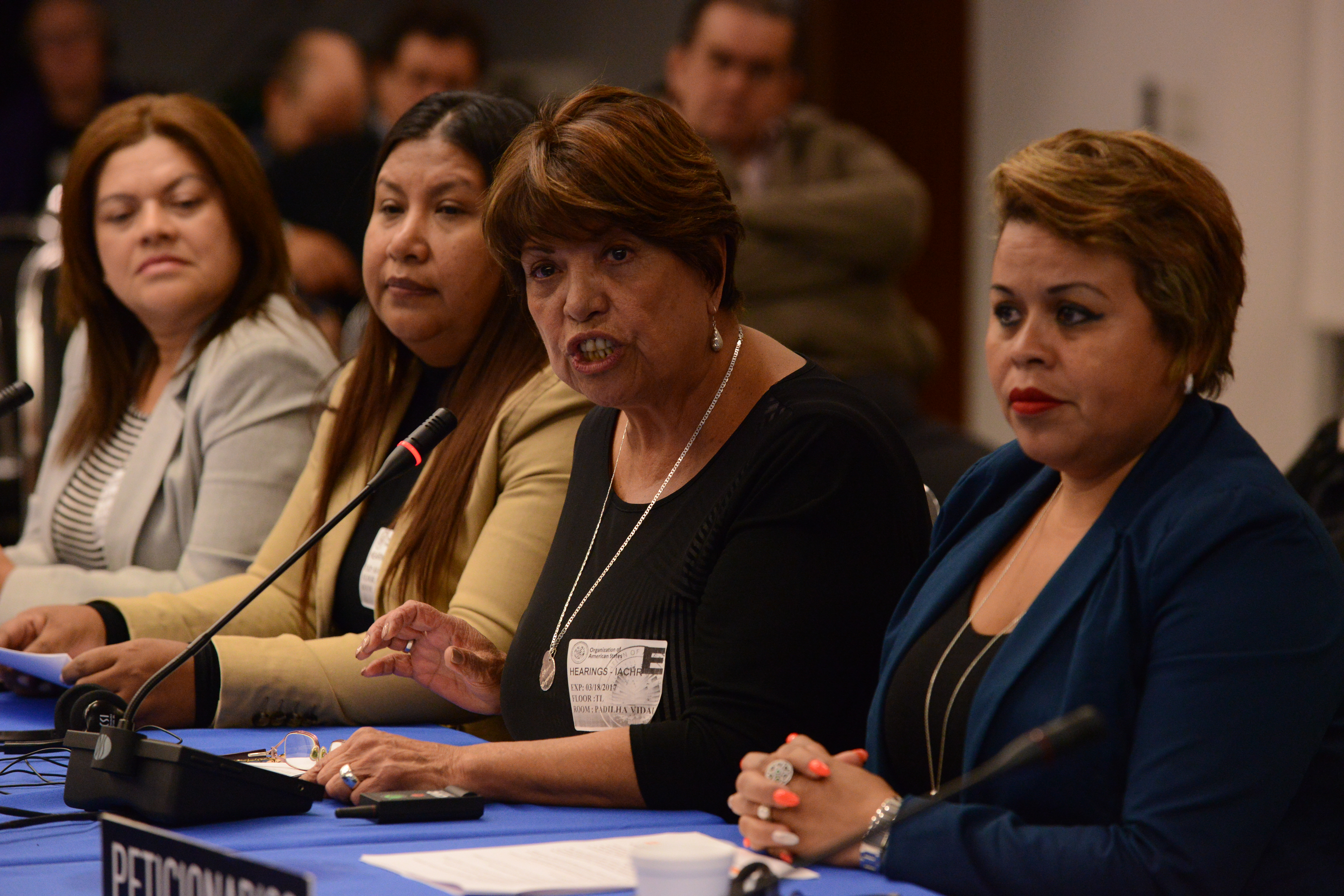
RedTraSex

RedTraSex is a transnational network of female sex workers from 15 Latin American countries. It was founded in 1997 in Heredia, Costa Rica and currently has its central headquarters in Argentina. The organization's main objective is to gain recognition from nation-states for its members, who demand to be protected as legitimate workers and have access to adequate work and social benefits. RedTraSex uses a feminist rights-based approach to connect members with programs that address their needs. It fosters unity among members through communication platforms, awareness campaigns, support for community-based organizations, and publishing research on issues faced by sex workers. Its transnational impact in the region is particularly noteworthy.

== North America ==
May "Maime" Pinzer, a former sex worker from the United States, started an informal halfway house for young women as early as 1915 in Canada, making it the first recorded activist effort in North America. Known as the "Montreal Mission for Friendless Girls." it was explicitly aimed at Jewish and Protestant sex workers, because as Maimie observed that "what help is extended to girls at all here is thru the Catholic Church."

The organized sex workers' rights movement in North America began in 1973, at the peak of the second-wave feminist movement. Sex workers organized demanding that feminists acknowledge the decriminalizing sex work as a women's issue and a race issue.

The crusade against trafficking and sex work in the United States has been dominated by a coalition of religious rights and abolitionist feminists. Abolitionist feminists are those who argue that the sex industry should be eliminated because of its objectification and oppressive treatment of women. Contrary to religious and abolitionist feminists, other feminists allied with sex workers to support of decriminalization.

On 16 December 1971, a feminist Conference on Prostitution was held in Chelsea High School in New York City. Organized by thirty women belonging to various feminist groups, the conference featured workshops and a final discussion panel on "The Elimination of Prostitution." This event was one of the earliest confrontations between sex workers and feminists who had never worked in the sex work industry. Participants confused sexual coercion with sex work which caused a small group of sex workers to speak up rejecting the feminists' plan to save and rehabilitate them.

Decriminalization was the main topic in the final discussion panel, but things quickly became a debate when it was brought up that decriminalization would increase the criminalization of the client. Scholar, Melinda Chateauvert, summed this experience to be one of the moments that would happen again in the feminist movement: a debate on whether sex was good or bad for women with implicit or explicit intentions of controlling male sexuality.

In Canada, sex workers in Toronto and Vancouver launched constitutional challenges in 2007 to strike down provisions related to adult prostitution in the Criminal Code of Canada. Despite ongoing social movement obstacles, the history of sex worker rights activism in Canada has produced sex worker-run organizations and political coalitions that have garnered support from other organizations, researchers, and cause lawyers, making it possible for sex workers to mobilize legally against federal prostitution laws.

=== COYOTE, Call Off Your Old Tired Ethics ===
In May 1973, Margot St James founded COYOTE (Call Off Your Old Tired Ethics) with Jennifer James, a Seattle-based professor of anthropology. COYOTE was preceded by WHO (Whores, Housewives, and Others) a group that sought to bring women together based on their commonalities and engaged mainly in consciousness-raising. COYOTE was one of the several liberal groups that wanted to expand the rights of privacy in the wake of Roe versus Wade; the National Gay Task Force, and American Civil Liberties Union Sexual Privacy Project also began as initiatives. COYOTE believed that women who worked as sex workers should have the same citizenship rights as others. St James gathered together reputable citizens who gave COYOTE credibility, money and recruited professionals to provide legal services, information and expertise. COYOTE's mission received support from an initial $5,000 grant from San Francisco's Glide Foundation, known for its social justice work and community action organizing. With this money, COYOTE organized its first sex worker conference in 1974 at the Glide United Methodist Church in Tenderloin, SF. St James didn't want to "organize" or build an activist membership core. Rather COYOTE took a laissez-faire approach to organize by providing a safer space for sex workers to meet and find support. To spread the word, local and national underground papers ran notices of meetings and events. COYOTE's contact information was passed out by Haight-Ashbury and the San Francisco Sex Information switchboards, at the Tenderloin's free medical clinic and other social services and referral centers. Off Our Backs and other women newspapers across the country listed COYOTE's twenty-four-hour emergency phone number.

COYOTE created a bail fund created with money raised from its Hookers' Ball, the project was intended to free women from exploitative pimps. The crime of prostitution created a huge victim class of women overlapping with legal, social, economic, health, family and education issues. In the SF Bay Area, COYOTE created social welfare groups and assistance services. COYOTE's programs were radically different in their approach to sex workers' problems. The few services available for sex workers were still perpetuating sexual shame towards women and girls, COYOTE shifted this paradigm. COYOTE did not train "fallen women" for minimum waged jobs they wanted women to be conscious to be angry and to do something about the way society treated "loose women." COYOTE offered a radical critique that affirmed women's anger and let them know they were not alone in the experiences of whorephobia and slut shaming discrimination.

=== St James Infirmary, San Francisco, California ===
St James Infirmary is fundamentally against the criminalization of sex workers. They believe in a revolution through healthcare and challenge the conventional healthcare model that divides patients with an unhealthy power dynamic. St James Infirmary provides a peer-based model to create a safe, trusted and honest environment that provides services and empowers communities. They are funded on the principle of harm reduction and support sex workers being treated with dignity and respect in every aspect of their lives. Some of their services include increasing access to primary healthcare and social services for sex workers throughout the San Francisco Bay Area. St James Infirmary also formalizes communication and collaboration among individuals and agencies that serve sex workers. In all their work, St James promotes a peer-based public health initiative to improve occupational health and safety standards to develop comprehensive medical and social services for sex workers around the world.

The story of St James is a famous story of the power of a phone call. Early one morning, COYOTE received a telephone call from a sex worker who had just left court. She wanted to know about the blood she got drawn in jail was legal. From this, the general counsel to the Department of Public Health put COYOTE in touch with the director of prevention and control at the San Francisco Department of Public Health to find out what was occurring at DPH and in the jails. Carol Leigh, also known as Scarlott Harlott, and others from COYOTE met with Dr. Klausner to discuss the testing he was doing in jails to eradicate syphilis. Dr. Klausner saw this testing as logical while COYOTE did not agree. Despite initial doubts, Priscilla Alexander shared her plan for St James Infirmary with Dr. Klausner. Shortly after, Dr. Klausner became a partner of St James Infirmary and gave them their first office space.

In June 1999, COYOTE and EDA appointed Johanna Breyer as the first executive director of St James Infirmary. Dawn Passar, who had been the outreach coordinator at the Asian AIDS Project, joined the infirmary as its first outreach coordinator, and Dr. Deborah Cohan became the first medical director. "Dr. Chuck" Cloniger was St. James Infirmary's first Nurse Practitioner, who worked with the infirmary for over two decades. St. James Infirmary opened its doors in June 1999 one night a week. By week two, participants had to arrive early because the line for peer-based, non-judgmental health care was flowing out onto the sidewalk.

=== Sex Workers Action Program (SWAP), Ontario, Canada ===
Sex Worker Action Program, (SWAP) in Hamilton is a sex worker-led advocacy group in Hamilton, Ontario. Although begun in 2018, in May 2022, SWAP established a physical communal space where individuals could gather in a safe environment. The executive director is Jelena Vermilion. Located on Barton Street, the group offers community education on health and safety, including Pre-Exposure Prophylaxis—a medication for HIV prevention. The organization actively engages in advocacy efforts, promoting the fair treatment of individuals in the sex industry. The group frequently sends representatives to participate in academic and community based conferences. SWAP also conducts workshops for businesses and organizations in Hamilton. SWAP is dedicated to supporting sex workers, addressing their diverse challenges through a combination of educational initiatives and direct actions. SWAP has also organized protests and vigils to bring attention to the murder of sex workers. In July 2022, they helped raise $9,000 to support the victim of a beating and sexual assault on Barton Street East, in Hamilton.

SWAP has partnered with the Greater Hamilton Health Network (GHHN), an Ontario Health Team to provide support services to sex workers.

== Transgender sex worker movements ==
Transgender sex workers have historically formed part of sex worker movements and have also formed part of LGBTQ+ movements. The struggle for the rights of the LGBTQ community has always been interconnected with the struggle for the rights of sex workers, both of which maintain that the state and the police do not have the authority to dictate how consenting adults utilize their bodies.

Due to intersecting stigmas surrounding transgender identity and social attitudes around homosexuality, sex workers face dangerous working conditions such as disproportionate rates of gender-based violence, police brutality, higher rates of unsolved murders. Transgender sex workers frequently face difficulty obtaining appropriate identification papers which complicates access to state-funded services and further exacerbates and creates obstacles for migration.

=== Street Transvestite Action Revolutionaries (STAR) ===
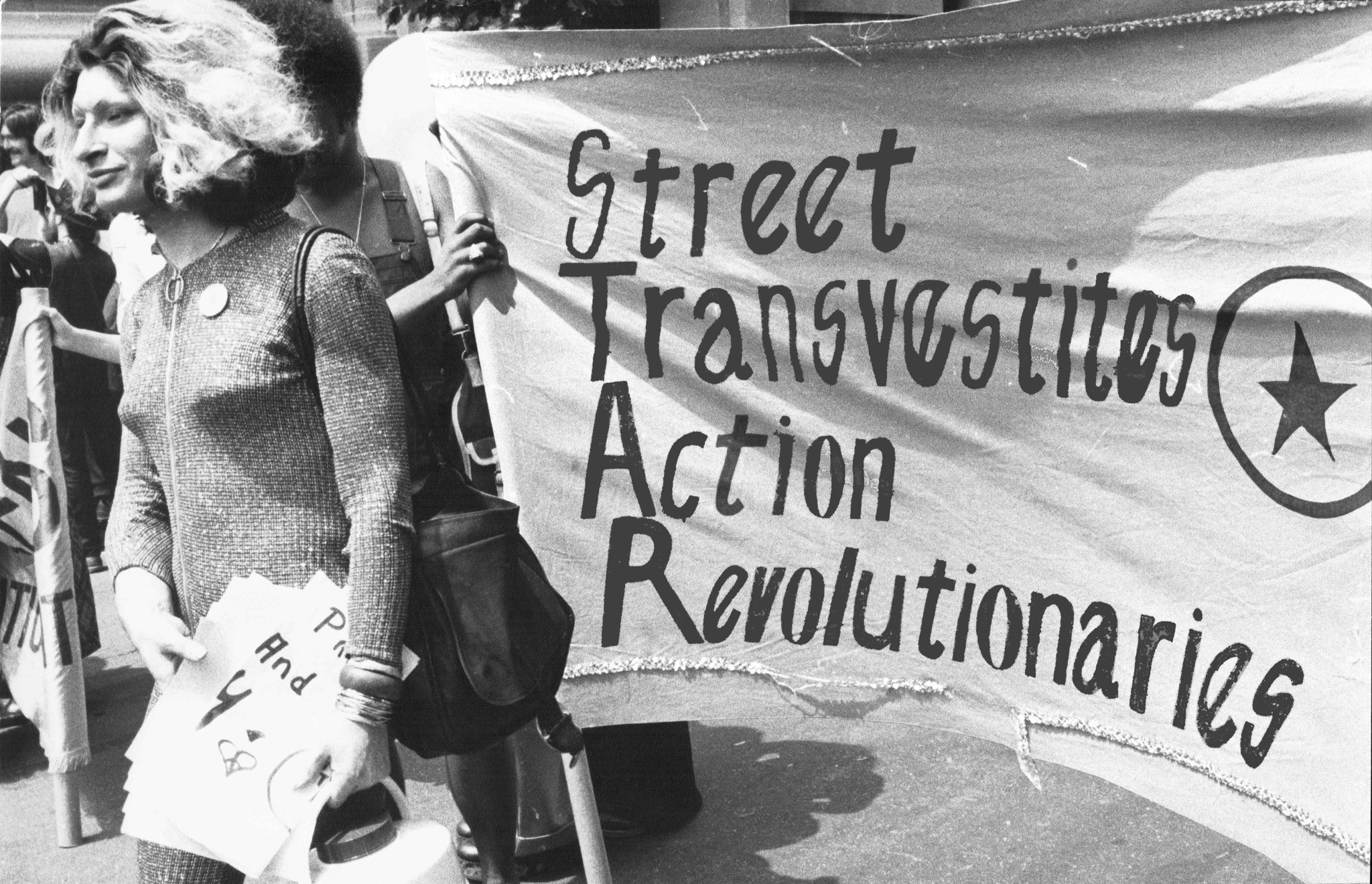
Sylvia Rivera next to STAR Banner

The first of many LGBTQ+-led efforts for transgender sex workers was Street Transvestite Action Revolutionaries (STAR). STAR was founded and funded by Gay Liberation Front Leaders and activists Sylvia Rivera and Marsha P. Johnson in 1970. Both were engaged in sex work and wanted to create an organization that helped other transient transgender street youth. Professor of Social Work Benjamin Shepard highlights how Rivera frequently had disagreements with conventional LGBTQ organizations that supported assimilation. She represented the alternative community of young queer individuals who resided, survived, and labored on the streets.

=== Casa de las Muñecas Tiresias ===
In 2019 Kenya Cuevas Fuentes established Casa de las Muñecas Tiresias the only shelter in Mexico exclusively for transgender women after witnessing Paola Buenrosto, her friend and fellow transgender sex worker, killed in front of her in 2016. Casa de las Muñecas Tiresias provides housing, meals, and medical care to transgender individuals, sex workers, and those with HIV/AIDS. The organization also works to provide chances for social reintegration to individuals who have been released from prison and works on HIV/AIDS prevention as transgender sex workers are more at risk because of the inaccessible healthcare system. In addition to their work in Casa de las Muñecas Tiresias, Kenya Cuevas advocates for the legal classification of transfemicide as a hate crime in Mexico.

=== Centro de Apoyo a Las Identidades Trans ===
In Mexico City, the Centro de Apoyo a Las Identidades Trans was established on 23 November 2011, and emerged during the COVID-19 pandemic to serve and advocate for the human rights of transgender sex workers and other LGBTQ+ community members. This group focuses on the promotion and defense of human rights, community mobilization, access to health care and justice, and legal recognition of gender and identity. Through the Haciendo Calle initiative, the Centro de Apoyo a Las Identidades Trans in collaboration with the Mexican Alliance of Sex Workers (AMETS) distributed Personal Protective Equipment (PPE). The PPE included sexually transmitted infection prevention supplies such as condoms along with food and monetary support for transgender sex workers to help mobilize during the economic hardships of the pandemic due to loss of work and lack of support from the Government of Mexico City as they are not recognized as workers.

=== Jauria Trans ===
The group Jauria Trans operates in Mexico City and offers a ranges from workshops and to concerts, fashion shows, and art exhibitions as a way to address issues such as trans families, religion, homophobic systems and with trans childhoods they made a fashion show. “It is a safe space where trans identities can express themselves freely and become an active part of a work designed to create community”, says the director Alexandra Rodríguez.

== See also ==
- COYOTE
- Decriminalization of sex work
- Revolting Prostitutes
- World Charter for Prostitutes' Rights
