= Occupation of Saint-Nizier church by Lyon prostitutes =

1975 protest in Lyon, France

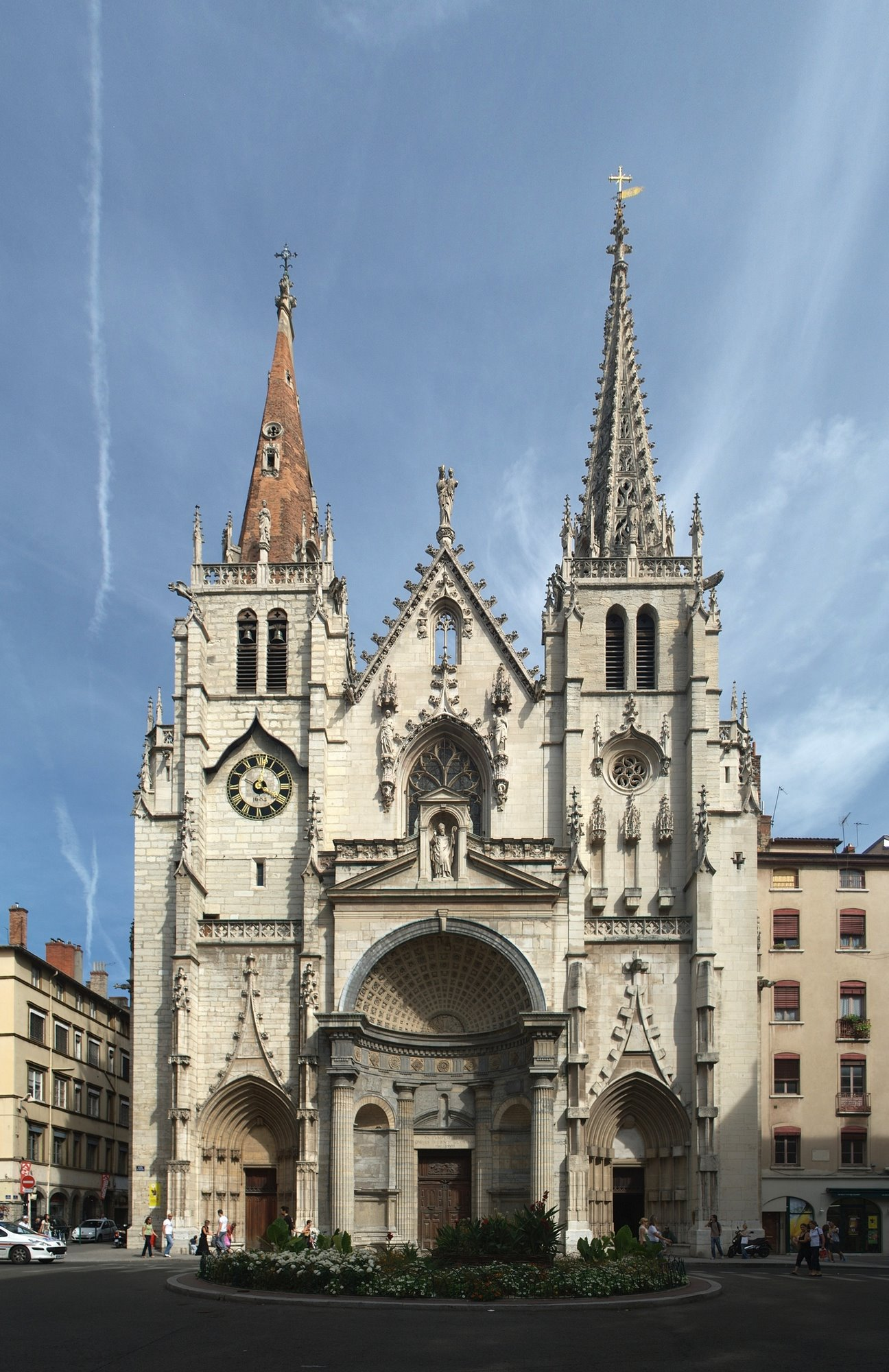
Facade of Saint-Nizier Church in Lyon

The occupation of Saint-Nizier Church by Lyon prostitutes was the eight-day occupation of Saint-Nizier Church (June 2–10, 1975) in Lyon, France by more than one hundred prostitutes to draw attention to their inhumane working conditions. The occupation ended on June 10, 1975, when the women were removed by the police. The sex workers gathered and protested for two key rights: attaining greater health benefits and an end to police harassment. Sympathetic occupations of churches by sex workers followed in Paris, Marseille, Grenoble, Saint-Étienne and Montpellier.

== Background ==
French sex workers have generally come from the lower echelons of society. Often uneducated, many sex workers lacked necessary medical resources and adequate living conditions. A survey in Paris in 1975 recorded that less than 40% of sex workers had health insurance, despite the country having had near-universal health insurance coverage since 1930.

In France, sex workers also protested their lack of access to social services such as welfare or retirement. Sex workers in early 1975 highlighted the hypocrisy of the French government, which received tax revenue from sexual services, yet did not allow these same sex workers to benefit from the system they contributed to.

The ratification of the UN Convention for the Suppression of the Traffic in Persons and of the Exploitation of the Prostitution of Others in 1960 initiated an anti-prostitution stance in France. This treaty represented a shift in French policy from one of regulation to one of abolitionism. Under the new policy, sex work itself was not technically illegal, but prostitution was no longer organized by the state and any third-party involvement was illegal. Despite this shift in policy, the French police did not change how they treated sex workers. The limited absolutes in the law allowed the police to interpret it as they chose.

Some hotel owners began bribing police officers in order to continue using their hotels as brothels. In August 1972, local politicians and police in Lyon were charged with corruption. As a result of this scandal, approximately 400 sex workers in Lyon were no longer able to work in hotels, which had previously provided them with relatively safe working conditions. A group of 30 sex workers responded to these hotel closures with a demonstration on August 24, 1972. The demonstrators were mocked and later arrested and held for hours.

As a result of the bribery scandal, a new police force was enacted. The police adopted a stricter attitude towards prostitution in order to prove that corruption no longer existed between procurers and police. The fact that sex workers were no longer allowed to work in hotels resulted in them turning to unsafe conditions, either in alleys or even the cars of clients. Being more exposed and visible, sex workers were increasingly cited and fined. Some sex workers were cited multiple times per day and others were cited when they were not even soliciting clients. The Lyon police force cited these sex workers for "incitement to debauchery."

The police force demonstrated a lack of interest in ensuring the safety of the sex workers. For instance, by 1975 it was estimated that one third of sex workers in Paris were victims of physical assault. While the occupation occurred in Lyon, the mistreatment and abuse of sex workers took place across France. When three sex workers were murdered between March and August 1974, the police did not investigate any of the cases. The government was unwilling to improve the situation, so sex workers in Lyon began to organize themselves in April 1975. Driven primarily by their lack of social services and the buildup of police fines and violence, their leader "Ulla" (Marie-Claude Peyronnet-Masson's pseudonym) appeared on television to publicize the women's demands.

== Occupation ==
On June 2, 1975, more than 100 sex workers occupied the Saint-Nizier Church in Rue de Brest and went on strike. They demanded the termination of fines, police harassment, and the release of ten women who had been imprisoned a few days earlier for soliciting. The protesting workers sang political chants and demanded proper working conditions and an end to the degradation they endured.

During the occupation, the women received support from outside groups, including Catholic social activists and feminist organizations, who helped provide resources and organizational experience. The protest transformed the church from a sacred space into a site of political expression. It became a place where women organized collectively to have meetings, hold press interactions, and voice their demands.

The occupation made national headlines and was reported internationally. Local people supported the women, bringing them clothes and food. The occupation lasted eight days, with an estimated 100–150 sex workers protesting and demanding an end to police harassment and fines. Although this action shocked the public at the time, it was actually the result of ongoing organizing that had been happening behind the scenes. The protesters pointed out that while the police claimed sex workers destroyed families, the police harassment itself was actively harming women and their families. Prison was not just a punishment for these women; it threatened to reveal their work to their parents or children, and carried the risk of losing custody of their kids. "[Our] children don't want to see their mothers go to jail" was their proclamation as they took over the church on the morning of June 2.

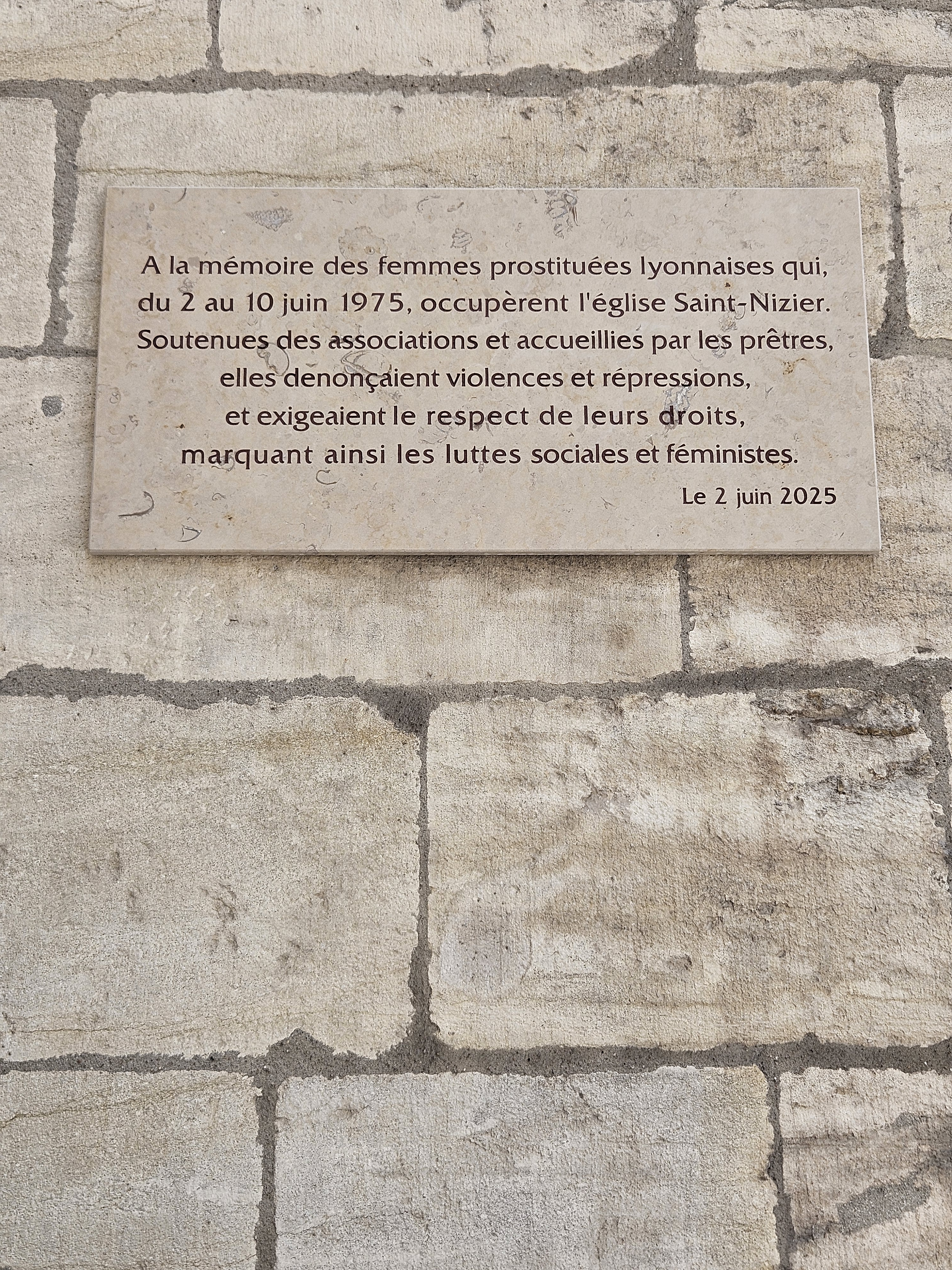
Plaque outside Saint-Nizier Church commemorating 50 years since the occupation

The occupation received support from political and feminist organizations, and unions. They were backed by minority groups of gay men and the Mouvement du Nid, which opposed sex work yet still condemned police harassment of sex workers.

The parish priest, Rev. Antonin Béal, refused to call the police to remove the women. However, acting on government orders, they were eventually forcibly removed by the police on the dawn of June 10. No government members agreed to their demands, yet the event marked the first unionization of sex workers, one of the most marginalized groups in French society at the time.

The French Minister of the Interior, Michel Poniatowski, claimed the women had been manipulated into the occupation by pimps. Women's Rights Minister, Françoise Giroud, refused to meet with the women, particularly Ulla, claiming she was "not competent" and dismissed her as unqualified to speak on the issue. Ulla ultimately became the event's protagonist and later had her real name and photograph printed in the press.

== Legacy ==
To commemorate the advocacy of the sex workers at the occupation of Saint-Nizier Church, June 2 has since been observed as International Whores' Day.

Shortly after the occupation concluded in 1975, two women from the United Kingdom founded the English Collective of Prostitutes (ECP). Recognizing the Lyon protest as the key factor for their formation, the ECP endorsed a similar agenda. They advocated for the decriminalization of sex work, minimal state interference, and improved safety. While fighting against police abuse, the ECP facilitated a twelve-day occupation of the Holy Cross Church in King's Cross, London, which mirrored the protest facilitated by the Lyon prostitutes.

Claude Jaget, a journalist working for the newspaper Libération, followed the occupation. In addition to publishing articles in Libération, he later published a book: Une vie de putain. The book gathers testimonies from six prostitutes who participated in the occupation of the church.

In 2016, the play Loveless was adapted from Jaget's book by Anne Buffet and Yann Dacosta, and premiered at the National Dramatic Center of Normandy-Rouen. It was also staged in Lyon at the Théâtre des Célestins in 2018.

== See also ==
- Outline of working time and conditions
- Prostitution in France
- Sex worker movements
- Sex workers' rights

== Bibliography ==
- Basaran, Tugba; Bigo, Didier; Guittet, Emmanuel-Pierre; Walker, R. B. J. (2016). International Political Sociology: Transversal Lines. Routledge. ISBN 9781317435907.
- Davies, John (2009). 'My Name is Not Natasha': How Albanian Women in France Use Trafficking to Overcome Social Exclusion (1998–2001). Amsterdam University Press. ISBN 9789053567074.
- Grant, Melissa Gira (2014). Playing the Whore: The Work of Sex Work. Verso Books. ISBN 9781781683231.
- Hendrik, Wagenaar; Helga, Amesberger; Altink, Sietske (2017). Designing Prostitution Policy: Intention and Reality in Regulating the Sex Trade. Policy Press. ISBN 9781447324249.
- Jaget, Claude (1975). Une vie de putain (in French). Presses d'aujourdhui.
- Mathieu, Lilian (2001). "Une mobilisation improbable: l'occupation de l'église Saint-Nizier par les prostituées lyonnaise" (PDF). Revue Française de Sociologie. 42 (1): 107–131.
- Bonetti, Sébastien. "Longwy. Savez-Vous Qui Était Ulla Du 3615 Ulla?" Longwy. Savez-Vous Qui Était Ulla Du 3615 Ulla?, Le Républicain Lorrain, 4 Feb. 2025, www.republicain-lorrain.fr/culture-loisirs/2025/01/16/savez-vous-qui-etait-ulla-du-36-15-ulla.

== In media ==
- Les prostituées de Lyon parlent, documentary film by Carole Roussopoulos, 46 minutes, production: Video Out1, 1975 (EAN 3700301014634)
- La révolte des prostituées de Saint-Nizier, radio documentary by Eurydice Aroney and Julie Beressi for France Culture
- "The first sex worker strike: 'We are just women and mothers'". BBC News.
