= International Whores' Day =

International day observed annually on June 2

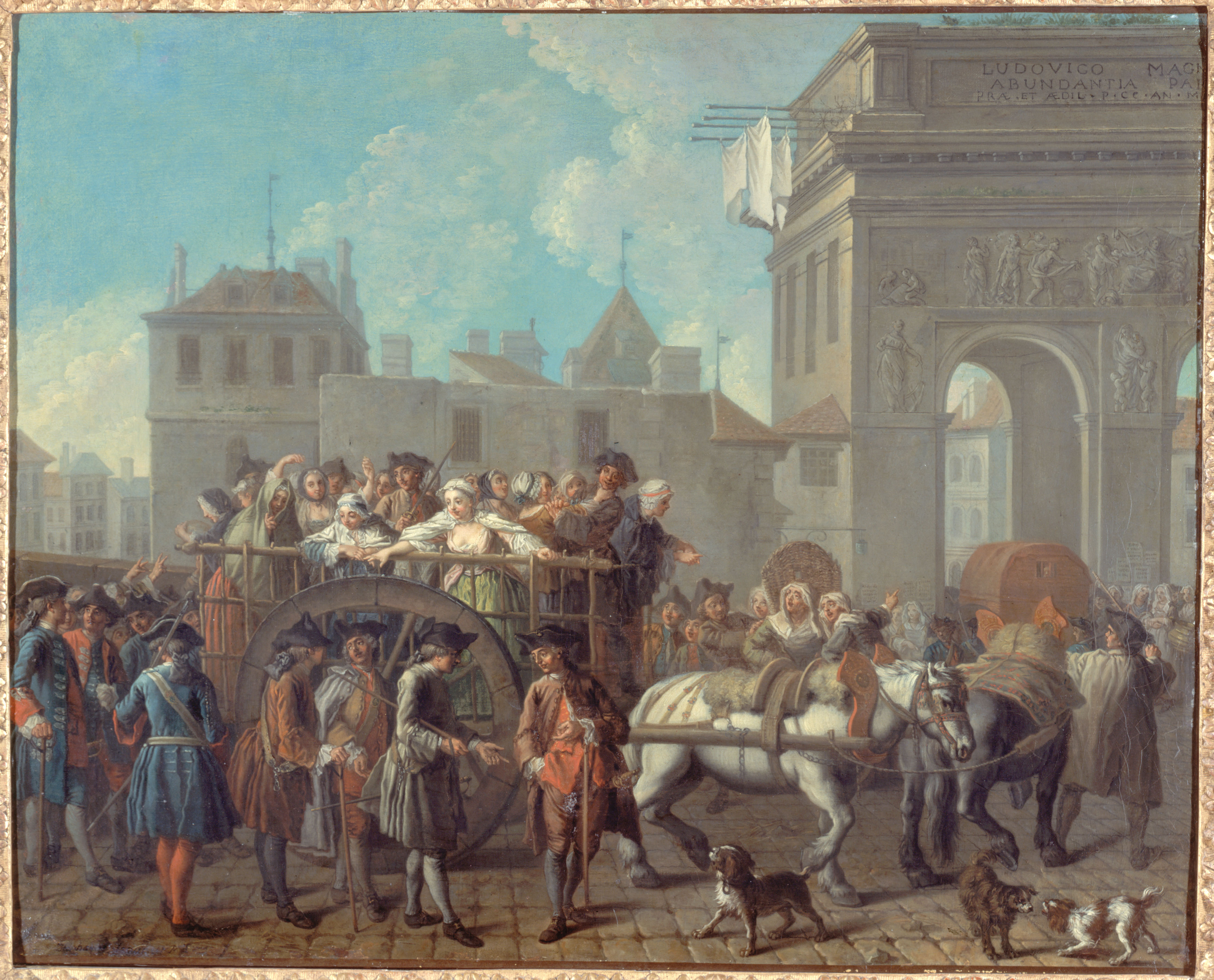
French prostitutes are carted off to the Salpêtrière prison (Étienne Jeaurat, 1745)

International Whores' Day or International Sex Workers' Day, observed annually on June 2, honours sex workers and recognises the often exploitative nature of their working conditions. The date commemorates the occupation of Église Saint-Nizier in Lyon by more than a hundred sex workers on June 2, 1975, to draw attention to their inhumane working conditions. It has been celebrated annually since 1976. In German, it is known as Hurentag (German for 'Whores' day') and in Spanish-speaking countries, it is entitled Día Internacional de la Trabajadora Sexual (Spanish for 'International Day of the Sex Worker').

== Background ==
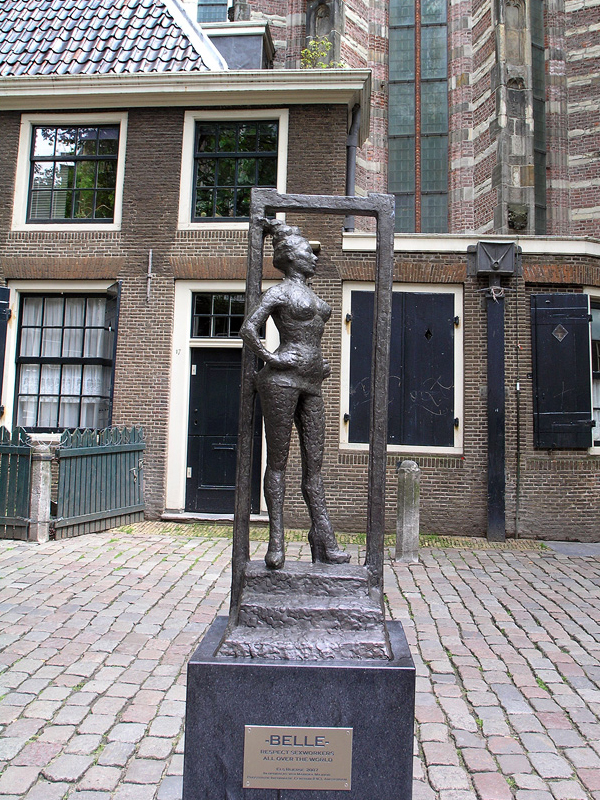
Bronze statue Belle in front of the Oude Kerk in the De Wallen red-light district in Amsterdam. It was unveiled in March 2007 with the inscription "Respect sex workers all over the world."

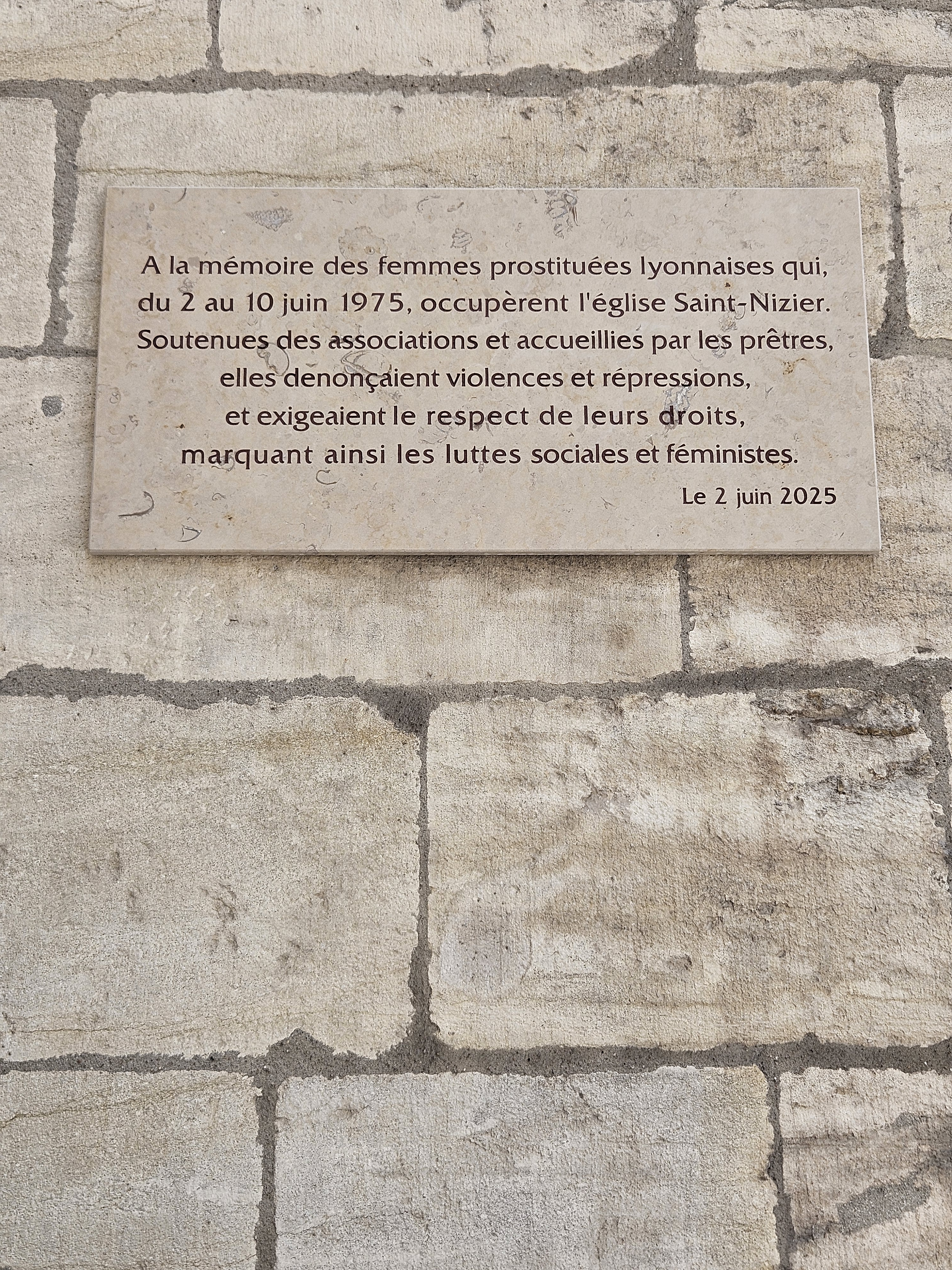
Plaque outside Église Saint-Nizier de Lyon commemorating 50 years

In the 1970s, French police put sex workers under increasing pressure. The police repression forced them to work increasingly in secret. As a result, they had less protection, and there was more violence against sex workers. After two murders and the unwillingness of the government to improve the situation, sex workers in Lyon occupied the Saint-Nizier Church and went on strike. The striking workers sang political chants and demanded decent working conditions and an end to social stigma.

The police cleared the church after eight days. The event marks the starting point of an international movement of sex workers for sex workers' rights.

== Germany ==
A reading entitled "Women without rooms" in Bochum, Germany, on 29 May 2011, documented that the situation of sex workers has not improved since 1975. The reading was devoted to the sex workers of the neighbouring city of Dortmund, who are oppressed as the sex workers of Lyon were in 1975.

== Similar memorials ==
- 3 March: International Sex Workers' Rights Day
- 17 December: International Day to End Violence Against Sex Workers
