= Susan G. Sherman =

American epidemiologist

- Born: Louisville, Kentucky

Academic background
- Education: BA, 1989, University of Michigan; MPH, 1996, UNC Gillings School of Global Public Health; PhD, 2000, Johns Hopkins Bloomberg School of Public Health

Academic work
- Institutions: Johns Hopkins Bloomberg School of Public Health

Susan Gail Sherman is an American epidemiologist. She is the Bloomberg Professor of American Health in the Department of Health, Behavior and Society at Johns Hopkins University.

== Early life and education ==
Sherman was born and raised in Louisville, Kentucky. She earned her Bachelor of Arts degree from the University of Michigan, her Master's degree in public health from the University of North Carolina at Chapel Hill's Gillings School of Global Public Health and her PhD from Johns Hopkins Bloomberg School of Public Health.

== Career ==
Upon completing her PhD, Sherman joined the faculty at Johns Hopkins Bloomberg School of Public Health and JHSPH Department of Epidemiology as an assistant professor. In this role, she conducted an HIV-prevention study in Baltimore that used the making and selling of jewellery to help women move away from their involvement in prostitution. The pilot project, called JEWEL (Jewelry Education for Women Empowering Their Lives) paid women at high risk for HIV-infection to attend six workshops on HIV and sexual-risk prevention and beaded jewellery instruction. Overall, the women in the pilot project sold jewelry at 11 public sales and earned more than $7,000.

As Sherman continued to research HIV prevention and sex workers, she was appointed the director of the Sex Workers Promoting Action, Risk Reduction, and Community Mobilization Center (SPARC). The centre is located in Pigtown, Baltimore and "provides addiction management, mental health counseling, sexual disease treatment." Within its first six months of operation in 2017, SPARC served about 150 women and had about 600 visits total. Sherman also worked with researchers in Rhode Island to develop a new strip which accurately detected fentanyl in street drug samples. Alongside Traci C. Green, she led a study to determine that the strips were 100 per cent accurate and detected the presence or absence of fentanyl in 96 percent of the samples from the Rhode Island State Public Health Laboratory. They also found that most users of Fentanyl were young, white, and frequent opioid users based on surveys of 308 people. In an effort to combat drug use, she was also the senior investigator of a study which suggested that most Fentanyl users would make use of safe consumption spaces which had sterile syringes and have medical support.

During the COVID-19 pandemic in North America, Sherman was appointed the Bloomberg Professor of American Health in the Department of Health, Behavior and Society.
