= Sex workers' rights =

Human, health, and labor rights of sex workers and their clients

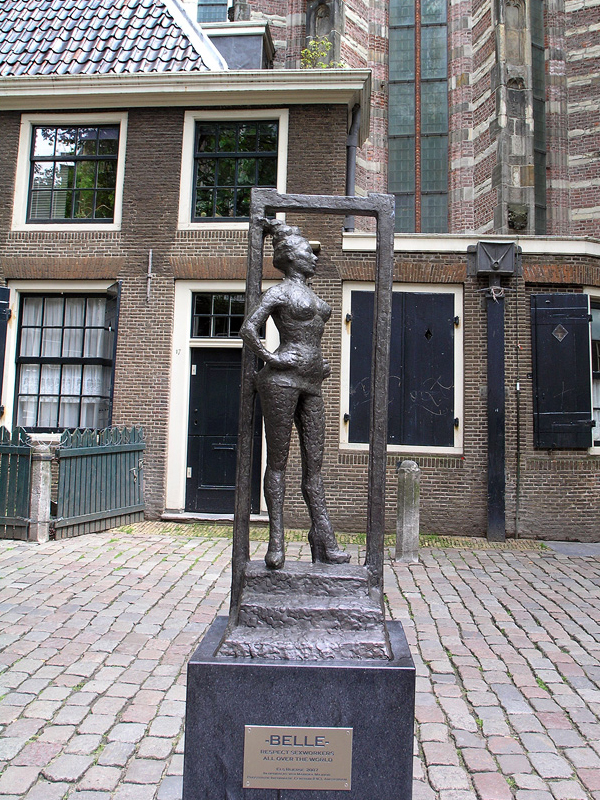
Bronze statue Belle in Amsterdam's red-light district De Wallen, in front of the Oude Kerk. It was unveiled in March 2007 with the inscription "Respect sex workers all over the world".

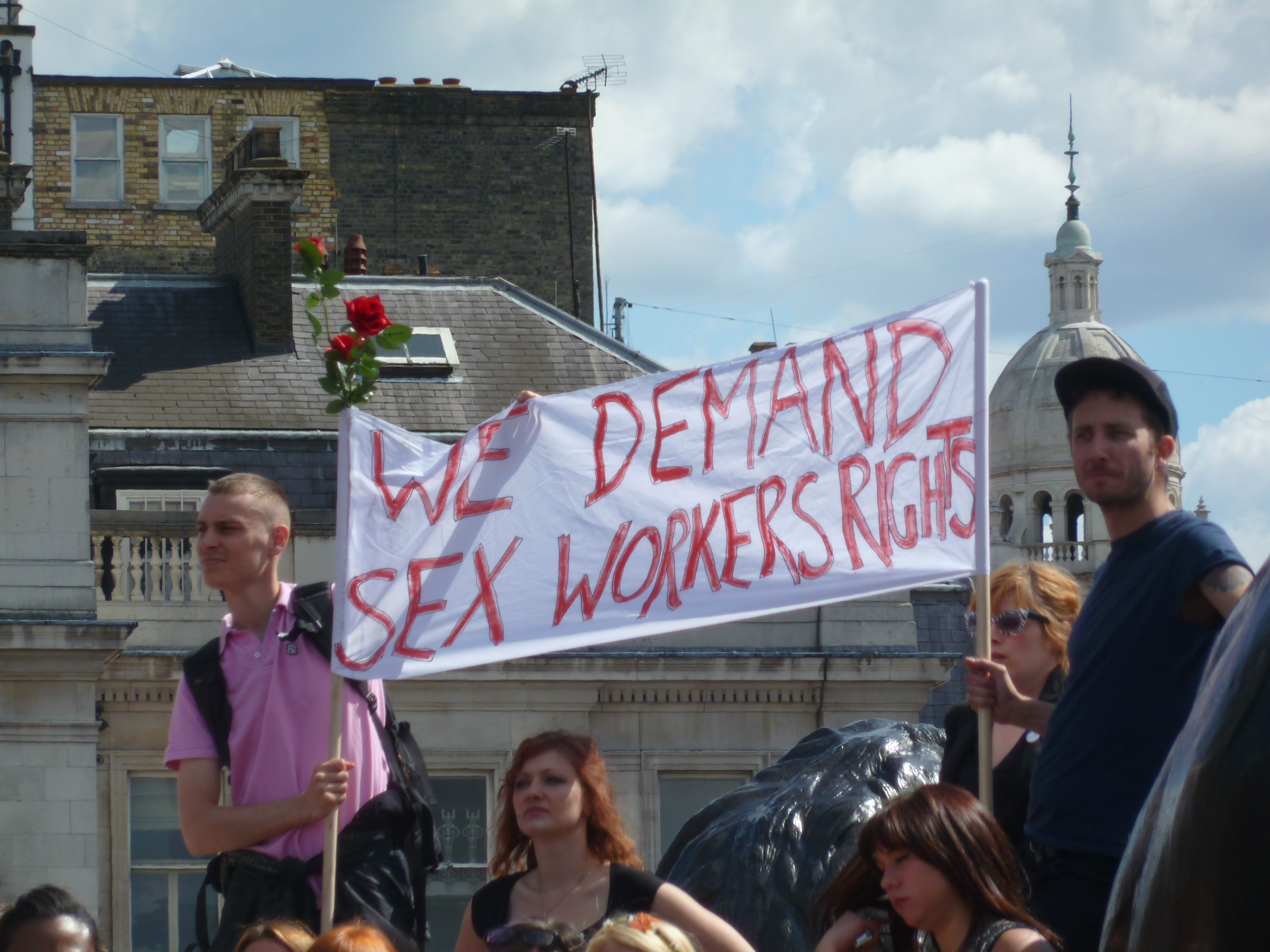
Sex workers' rights demonstration in London, England, 2011

Sex workers' rights encompass a variety of aims being pursued globally by individuals and organizations that specifically involve the human, health, and labor rights of sex workers and their clients. The goals of these movements are diverse, but generally aim to legalize or decriminalize sex work, as well as to destigmatize it, regulate it and ensure fair treatment before legal and cultural forces on a local and international level for all persons in the sex industry.

The term sex work, coined in 1978 as a linguistic labor organizing tool, refers primarily to prostitution, but also encompasses adult video performers, phone sex operators, webcam models, exotic dancers in strip clubs, and others who provide sex-related services. Some extend the use of the term to include "support personnel" such as managers, agents, videographers, club bouncers, and others. The debate over sex work is often characterized as an issue of women's rights, especially by those who argue that prostitution is inherently oppressive and seek to criminalize it or keep it illegal, but in fact, there are also many male and non-binary individuals engaged in providing sexual services. Most sex workers do not wish to be branded as criminals and regard laws against prostitution, pornography, and other parts of the sex industry as factors contributing to violence and thus violating their rights.

Since its introduction by sex workers at the 49th Venice Biennale in 2001, the red umbrella has become an internationally recognized symbol of the sex workers rights movement.

== Views ==
=== Discrimination and stigmatization ===
In most countries, even those where sex work is legal, sex workers of all kinds feel that they are stigmatized and marginalized and that this prevents them from seeking legal redress for discrimination (e.g., racial discrimination by a strip club owner, dismissal from a teaching position because of involvement in the sex industry), non-payment by a client, assault, or rape. Activists also believe that clients of sex workers may also be stigmatized and marginalized, in some cases even more so than sex workers themselves. For instance, in Sweden, Norway, and Iceland, it is illegal to buy sexual acts, but not to sell them (the buyer is said to have committed a crime, but not the prostitute). In response to the growing sex liberation movement in the United States, the United Nations declared the 70's as the 'Decade of Women'.

=== Pornography debates ===
During the 1970s and 1980s, the main topics in the feminist discourse on women's sexuality were pornography, prostitution, and human trafficking. This led to the birth of the mobilization for sex worker rights in America. Carol Leigh is credited with coining the term "sex work" in the early 1978, and it was later popularized by a book published in 1989 called Sex Work.

The feminists involved in these debates held opposing views on how to eliminate sexual violence against women, and those involved were either classified as "liberal feminists" or "radical feminists". The third group of feminists is described as "pro-sex" or "sex positive feminism", and this view is considered the true feminist defense of pornography.

==== Radical feminist ====
The argument of the radical side rests upon the premise that pornography depicts women as subordinates and perpetrates violence against women. Some of the anti-porn feminists included Page Mellish, Andrea Dworkin, and Catharine MacKinnon.

Dworkin insisted that the oppression of women occurs through sexual subordination and that for gender equality to exist, subordination must be eliminated. Thus, she states that pornography and prostitution are incompatible with gender equality. Similarly, MacKinnon states that pornography is an act of sexual violence. On the grounds that pornography violated women's civil rights, she and Dworkin proposed a law named the "Anti-Pornography Civil Rights Ordinance" that allowed women to seek reparations for damages done by pornography through civil courts. Likewise, Page Mellish, the founder of Feminists Fighting Pornography (FFP), believed that issues facing feminists were rooted in pornography. Mellish allied with conservatives in 1992 to fight for the passing of the "Pornography Victims' Compensation Act", which was modeled after Dworkin and MacKinnon's ordinance.

==== Liberal feminist ====
Liberal feminists have traditionally been less focused on prostitution debates, given their broad focus on women's rights in public life, especially political and economic rights. Mainstream liberal feminists, such as the National Organization for Women, tend to oppose prostitution in principle, but are somewhat divided on prostitution politics and the specific measures in the struggle against human trafficking, particularly on criminalization.

==== Libertarian feminist ====
Contrarily, libertarian feminists believe that capitalism allows women to freely make whatever choices they desire. As such, some women freely choose to participate in pornography, as they do in other forms of labour. The main thing that these feminists fight against is censorship, regardless of whether they personally agree with pornography or not. On this side of the debate are feminists such as Gayle Rubin and Lynn Chancer. Rubin argues that anti-pornography laws could negatively harm sexual minorities such as gays/lesbians, sex workers, and feminists because they would create new problems and modes of abuse resulting from the anti-pornography side's use of a limited amount of porn that demonstrates the most extreme cases of violence such as sadomasochism. Likewise, Chancer argues that it is possible for such imagery to be able to circulate consensually and lawfully while genuine feelings of pleasure are being experienced without women feeling subordinated. She also states that some of these feminists believe that pornography is negatively affecting women by leading to violence against women when in actuality it is not. Thus, she concludes that radical feminists are looking at pornography as a quick fix to a much larger societal problem.

==== Sex-positive feminist ====
Sex-positive feminists believe that no form of sexual expression should be vilified, except that which is not consensual. One of the main advocates of this feminist perspective is Carol Queen. She argues that radical feminists probably generalize too widely as far as women are concerned, and do not take into consideration more complicated circumstances such as sadomasochism and prostitution. Elisa Glick also states that configurations of power within relationships do not prevent women from exercising it and that they can be used to enable women to exercise it. At the height of the movement, particularly following the Stonewall Riots, sex-positive feminists collared with other organizations such as the Gay Liberation Front in hopes of achieving a revolution. This entailed overthrowing capitalism, rejecting heteronormative ideas, and centering human rights. Although some of the common shared objectives were decriminalization, destigmatization, and increased economic/social/legislative opportunities, especially for trans sex workers and sex workers of color.

The first sex work organization, Call Off Your Old Tired Ethics (COYOTE), was founded in 1973 by Margo St. James. Although it worked on a wide range of issues, it focused primarily on the unequal treatment female sex workers received compared to male sex workers. Women prostitutes made up 90% of arrests, whereas male prostitutes were often let go.

==== Men on porn ====
There is debate on whether the consumption of porn among men is good for their well-being, though in a study of over 300 men aged 18 to 73, 97% report that they have watched porn, with 94% reporting having done so in the last 6 months and 82% reporting doing so in a manner they would consider "regularly". Men of all ages report an overall positive experience with porn, though younger men express greater negatives than older men—which researchers speculate is because porn skews their perceptions of sex.

=== "Sex Wars" debate ===
Pornography debates provided leeway for the emergence of the "Sex Wars" debates, a title assigned by feminist scholars. These debates began in the 1980s and centered upon ways that women were depicted in heterosexual sexual relations. The main premise of the anti-pornography movement rests upon the argument that pornography is degrading and violent towards women. These feminists also believe that pornography encourages men to behave violently towards women. However, liberal feminists argued that this argument does not take into account the pleasure that women can experience, stating that these arguments could backfire against women and subject them to a greater degree of subordination.

Thus, the debates started to become centralized on the role of dominance within heterosexual relationships and how this dominance is transferred to other areas of women's lives. These theories of male sexuality and female objectification and sexuality are controversial because they framed later debates about human trafficking, in which coerced workers are distinguished from voluntary workers.

The human trafficking debate has materialized as a result of the movement. Current debates center on whether the best way to protect women would be through abolition, criminalization, decriminalization, or legalization.

==== Legalization ====
Sex worker advocates who are fighting for legalization or decriminalization of prostitution contend that criminalizing consensual sex acts among adults creates a black market, which worsens the problem of forced human trafficking rather than reducing it. They decry the paternalistic attitude of what they disparagingly call "rescue missions", law enforcement raids that regard all sex workers as in need of "saving" fail to distinguish the minority of sex workers who are coerced from the vast majority who engage in sex work voluntarily. Furthermore, liberal feminists such as Ronald Weitzer and Gayle Rubin argue that the definition of sex work as inherently violent has created a "moral panic" that influences political discourse. They contend that this "panic" has led to the construction of a trafficking victim who may be a woman migrating for work. These feminists argue that this can backfire because it does not protect those women who voluntarily enter into sex work.

==== Criminalization ====
Opponents of the sex workers' rights movement, such as Melissa Farley and Janice Raymond, argue that prostitution should be abolished because legalization can increase incidences of human trafficking. The New UN Trafficking Protocol by Raymond argues that many victims are trafficked to countries in which sex work is legalized or decriminalized, and because they are trafficked under the guise of migrants, they are not protected. Raymond also argues that it is impossible to separate the exploitation experienced by local prostitutes from the exploitative experiences of trafficked prostitutes, as they are very similar. Thus, to end sex slavery, the report declares that everyone involved in sex work needs to be criminalized so that the industry can be abolished. Similarly, Farley argues that engagement in voluntary sex work is a decision made by women in the absence of alternative choices, and that it therefore cannot accurately be described as a voluntary and freely made choice.

United Nations guidance on sex workers' human rights

In 2024, the United Nations Working Group on Discrimination against Women and Girls released a report documenting persistent human rights violations faced by sex workers, including arbitrary arrest, police violence, barriers to health care, and exclusion from social protections. The report concludes that criminalization—whether targeting sex workers, clients, or third parties—intensifies stigma, unsafe working conditions, and vulnerability to violence. It notes that these harms disproportionately affect street-based workers, migrants, and transgender women. The Working Group identifies growing support across UN human rights mechanisms for full decriminalization of adult consensual sex work.

== Legality of prostitution ==
Most activists campaigning for the formation of policies that protect sex workers from violence fall into two main categories: abolitionism or criminalization, and legalization or decriminalization.

=== Abolitionism or criminalization ===
Early reformers identified the key problem with prostitution as male lust that lured innocent women into a depraved life as prostitutes. Thus, abolitionist proponents believe that prostitution is an exploitative system that is harmful to the women involved. Therefore, these activists believe that to prevent violence against women, the customers, pimps, and panderers should be punished so that the entire institution can be demolished. Because this policy approach is built upon the idea that women are helpless victims, opponents of this view believe that it is paternalistic and not empowering to women.

A study by Melissa Farley, a well-known supporter of the abolition of prostitution, and colleagues, suggests that violence is an intrinsic part of prostitution in which the chances of experiencing violence increases along with the number of years involved in prostitution. This study also concludes that prostitution tends to be multi-traumatic in all forms. Farley and colleagues also used the Netherlands as an example of a country to support the idea that legalized prostitution can still inflict harm on those involved. They stated that over 90% of the sex workers tend to show symptoms of PTSD. Therefore, these proponents advocate for abolitionism and criminalization as a method of protecting sex workers.

Criminalization proponents believe that the way to protect women from interpersonal violence is to punish both sex workers and customers for partaking in the buying and selling of sex.

==== Support for criminalization ====
Many proponents of abolitionism or criminalization of prostitution commonly use reasons based on studies done on the effects of prostitution in countries where it is legalized or decriminalized.

=== Legalization or decriminalization ===
Legalization or decriminalization proponents, on the other hand, believe that the selling and buying of sex exchange will continue no matter what. Therefore, the only way to effectively prevent violence is to acknowledge this and for government to build policies and laws that deal with the issue through regulation of the business. Legalization/Decriminalization proponents believe that a system that prohibits prostitution creates an oppressive environment for prostitutes. Proponents of this view also recommend that policies be built that places restrictions on trafficking and exploitation of sex workers.

==== Support for decriminalization or legalization ====
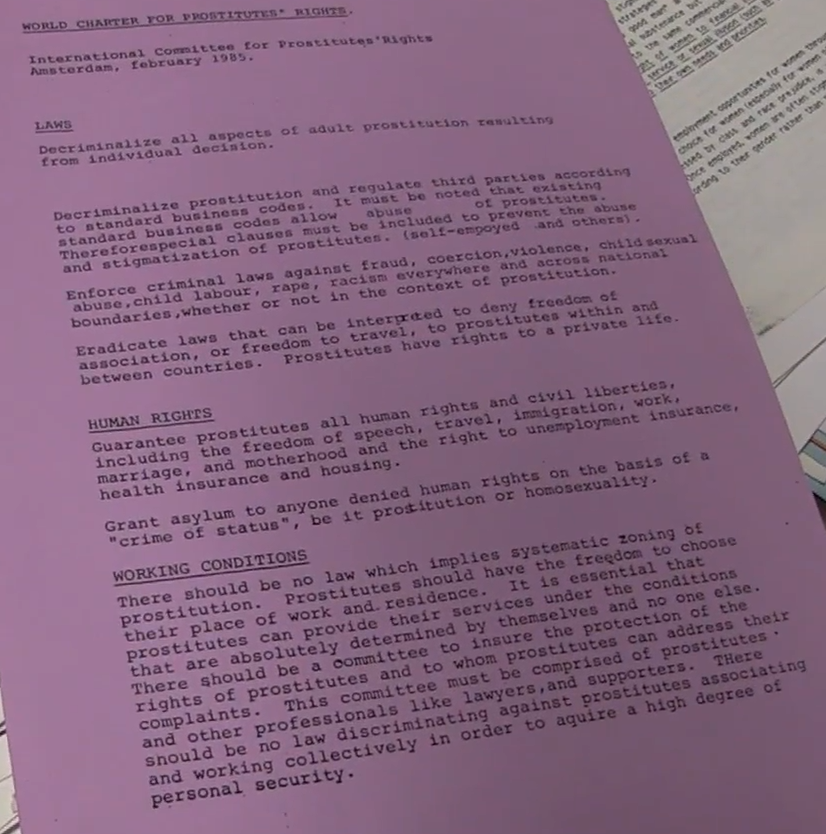
Page 1/2 of an original copy of the World Charter for Prostitutes' Rights (1985)

The legalization of sex work often entails additional restrictions and requirements placed on sex workers as well as registering with official government offices. Additionally, many activists favor decriminalization over legalization. Decriminalization involves a focus on laws that protect the rights of sex workers, such as those against coercion into or to stay in sex work, while all consensual sexual contact between adult sex workers and adult clients would not be criminalized. The very first line of the World Charter for Prostitutes' Rights, written and adopted by the International Committee for Prostitutes' Rights on 15 February 1985 at the first World Whores Congress in Amsterdam, states: "Decriminalize all aspects of adult prostitution resulting from individual decision."

Ronald Weitzer, a well-known proponent for the legalization/decriminalization of prostitution, stated that the use of nonscientific evidence about prostitution has contributed to a "moral panic" because opponents commonly use the argument that prostitution is inherently violent and unable to be regulated. However, he also claims that other governments have been able to reject this notion and find ways to regulate it and uses Nevada as an example.

Below are some of the main premises that the pro-legalization and pro-decriminalization of prostitution movement rests upon.

- Decriminalization or legalization can protect sex workers from violence most effectively, such as through onsite security at venues such as brothels and systems such as panic buttons, as well as the ability for sex workers to report abuse or crimes to the police without the fear of prosecution for committing illegal activity.
- Prostitution is a career option in which the free market is being taken advantage of and women's claims over their own bodies.
- Prostitution is a free choice.
- Prostitution is a transaction where no one is harmed, and the persons involved are consenting adults.
- Sex trafficking and coercion into the industry can be effectively reduced if sex work is legalized or decriminalized.
- Sex work could become a legal business, and human rights and worker's rights could be enforced by effective regulation, such as fair pay.
- Sex work is no more moral or immoral than other jobs.
- The criminalization of sex workers only exacerbates problems that they are already facing. Therefore, decriminalization or legalization can be a starting point to addressing these issues.
- The rates of rape could decrease if prostitution were legalized or decriminalized.
- There will always be people willing to pay for sex and there will always be people willing to offer it. Making consenting sex work a crime will not help these people.
- The spread of diseases can be hindered through the legalization or decriminalization of prostitution, such as through regular mandated health checks and required condom use.

Decriminalization is supported by academics, human rights organizations, such as Amnesty International, Human Rights Watch and the American Civil Liberties Union, UN agencies, such as UNAIDS, WHO, and UNDP, LGBT organizations such as ILGA and Lambda Legal, and anti-trafficking organizations such as the Global Alliance Against Traffic in Women, La Strada International, and the Freedom Network USA.

== Employment ==
Depending on regional law, sex workers' activities may be regulated, controlled, tolerated, or prohibited. For example, prostitution is illegal in many countries, but it is fully legalized in several jurisdictions, including the Netherlands, Germany, some Australian states, and several counties in the US state of Nevada. Legal restrictions to this occupation, result in adapting practices, in an effort to keep sex workers safe and employed.

=== Strip club employment issues ===
In both Canada and the UK, dancers in strip clubs are independent contractors who are unable to rectify because of their inability to challenge employers through organized action.

In the UK, a study was conducted that inquired about dancers' experiences. It stated that often, when the club offered promotions with gimmicks, dancers would be required to work without payment. Furthermore, dancers may be required to promote events without pay as part of the house rules. If they tried to complain, the club owners would threaten to dismiss them. The study states that dancers are also required to pay their "house moms" and the DJs, as well as being pressured to buy drinks for their customers and other dancers.

The fees of dancers' house fees are sometimes not waived or lowered. Also, clubs may continue to hire women even during bad economic downturns. Therefore, dancers feel that their earning potential is lowered. Dancers may not be paid for their stage shows because they are considered a part of self-advertisement. In the UK, the club generally takes thirty percent commission. Another way clubs make money is through fines and tips. This study found that there could be a fine for chewing gum, using cellular phones on the floor, and tardiness. Dancers also tip people that work in the club in order to get them to direct customers to them.

In the Canadian city of Toronto, workers must be in possession of an adult entertainer license that is only provided following a criminal record check and the submission of a form. Applicants are initially charged about C$400 and are required to pay an annual C$270 renewal fee. Municipal bylaws govern the standards that workers must abide by to maintain their license.

==== Unlawful or inappropriate customer behavior ====
A survey undertaken by the Toronto city council in 2012 was to inform reconsideration of the regulations around licensing for strip club-based sex workers. The most significant aspect was a reappraisal of the "no touching" rule so that it specified areas of the body to prevent people from being fined in the event of acceptable casual physical contact. Of those sex workers who responded to the survey, 67 percent stated that they had been sexually assaulted or touched without their consent, while they further documented the responses from their employers: 2 percent called the police, 34 percent asked the customer to leave, 22 percent ignored the incident, 4 percent blamed the stripper, and 14 percent dismissed the incidents as part of the job.

=== Digital entrepreneurship ===
Research indicates that forms of female digital entrepreneurship, such as sexual labor, are often delegitimized due to the socio-cultural assumptions that "[define] female sexual labour as illegitimate work". Historically, women's work has been devalued and hypersexualized. With reproductive labor devalued in relation to the economy. This means limited rights to those who perform them. This labor sector continues to increase annually; however, the financial instability remains unchanged.

Men who have sex with men often find hookup apps and websites as an introduction to sex work. Some men may use codes to circumvent censors, at the risk of being reported or banned. Sex workers who come to sex work through these apps may be poorly equipped to manage risks such as STIs and client vetting, and may not view themselves as sex workers due to the more casual nature of the hookup apps. This perspective can cause them to underestimate the risks of sex work.

Other studies have shown that hookup apps can be beneficial in providing safety, as they reduce the risk of solicitation on the street and allow for sex workers to have more control over who has access to knowledge of their services. Technology gives more opportunities for sharing information and setting expectations before meeting. Online sex work also creates a more comfortable attitude around sex work, especially among queer men.

=== By country ===
==== Argentina ====
The Association of Women Prostitutes of Argentina (AMMAR) was started by Elena Reynaga, who now heads the South American sex workers' network RedTraSex. RedTraSex, established in 1997, is a transnational coalition composed of various sex worker organizations across 15 Latin American countries and the Caribbean, including members from AMMAR. AMMAR leader Sandra Cabrera was killed for her activism in 2004.

==== Paraguay ====
The Association of Prostitute Women of Paraguay (UNES) whose executive secretary Lucy Esquivel has been part of the South American network of sex workers RedTraSex. Where there are several sites, one of them is working to prevent the mistreatment or sexual exploitation of workers Lucy Esquivel is working to demonstrate their hard work in Paraguayan society and fighting for the rights of sex workers.

==== Canada ====
The passing of Bill C-36 in 2014 (the Protection of Communities and Exploited Persons Act) criminalized the purchasing of sexual services in Canada. It stigmatized sex work by condemning sex work clientele and positing sex workers as victims of sexual exploitation. The criminalization of purchasing sexual services created riskier working conditions for sex workers due to services going underground to avoid clients being policed. For instance, sex workers now rush negotiations with clients to avoid being caught by the police. This bill has been referred to as 'end-demand legislation' and has been critiqued by sex workers and advocates in that it furthers harm experienced by sex workers rather than eliminating it. Their response to this legislation has been to call for the decriminalization of sex work and the purchasing of sex work services.

In February 2021, it was announced that the Law Foundation of B.C. and an anonymous donor would be contributing $1 million to the creation of a province-wide "bad date" database.

==== India ====
On March 10, 2014, the All India Network of Sex Workers, an umbrella group of sex worker organizations, campaigned for pension rights. Representative of 90 sex worker organizations across 16 Indian states, the Network presented a letter explaining that sex workers in India are not treated equally in social security terms. A spokesperson for the Network also informed the media that sex workers in India retire "by the age of 40–45 years", an earlier age than the broader population.

==== Netherlands ====
A study by Janice Raymond states that there can be many detrimental consequences to legalizing and decriminalizing prostitution. One consequence mentioned was that prostitution can be seen as a suitable and normal option for the poor. Therefore, poor women can be easily exploited when there is a lack of sexual services, which does not lead to their empowerment. Melissa Farley supported this idea with an analysis stating that most women do not rationally decide to enter prostitution; rather, the decision is made as a survival choice and that there are certain circumstances that can drive women into the field of prostitution, leaving them with a choice that is more along the lines of voluntary slavery. Thus, it is merely used as a surviving strategy.

Furthermore, Raymond states that businesses in the sex industry are able to offer services to any man, which has led to more gender inequality because women have to accept that prostitution is a new norm. She supported this by saying that even disabled men are able to receive sexual services, and their caregivers (mostly women) are required to assist them in engaging in sexual acts.

Another consequence Raymond mentioned was that child prostitution has increased in the Netherlands. She suggests this is because the Netherlands has created a prostitution-promoting environment through laws concerning children that make it easier for abusers to use children without penalty. She also adds that the distinction between voluntary and forced prostitution could be detrimental because it can be argued that the thought of someone being forced into prostitution can be exciting for some men because it may be a part of clients' fantasies. Finally, another study states that the legalization or decriminalization can be detrimental because studies that surveyed sex workers where it is legal concluded that violence is accepted as part of the job with the universal experience of molestation and abuse.

==== United States ====
People campinging for sex workers' rights in Minneapolis, Minnesota in October 2016
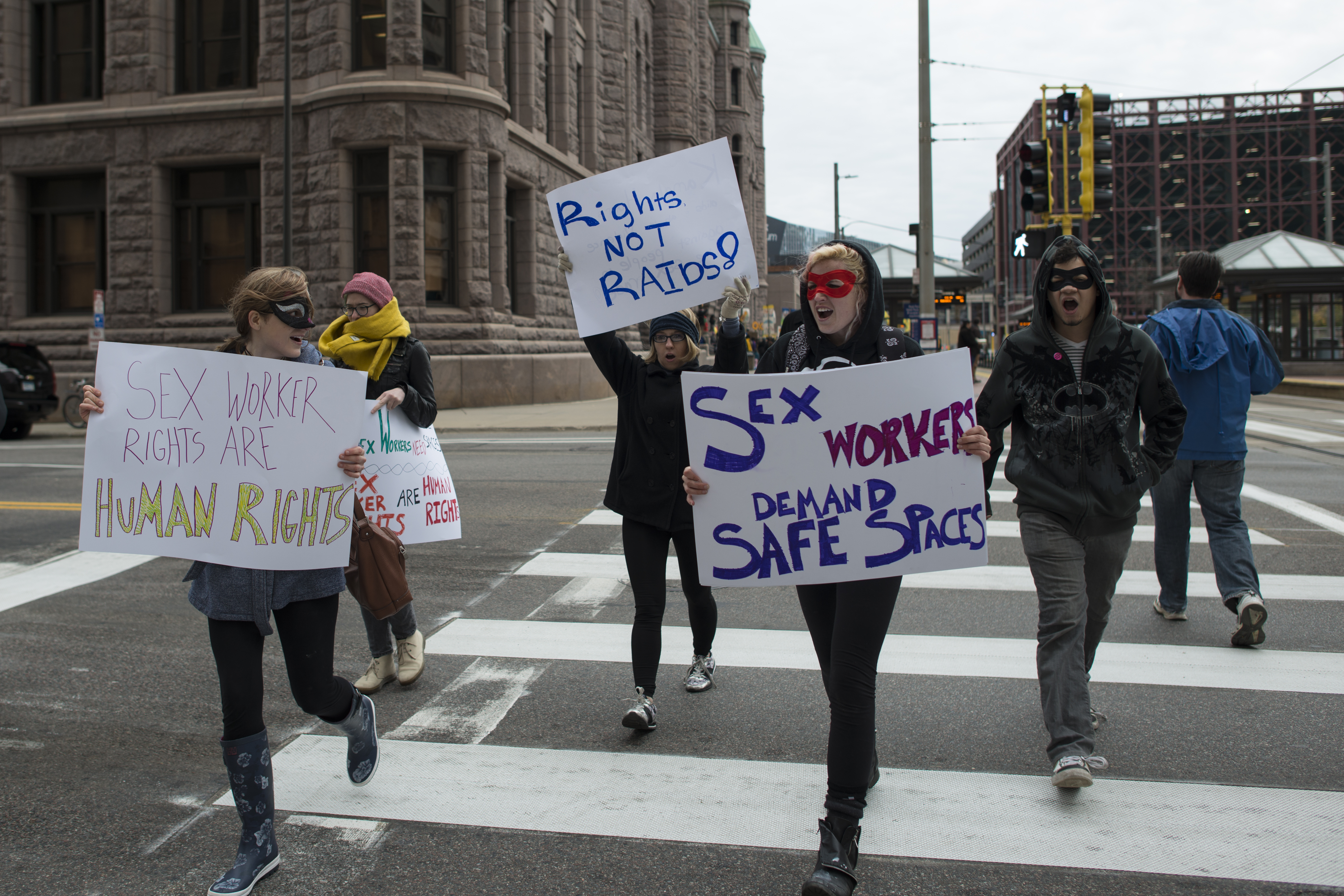
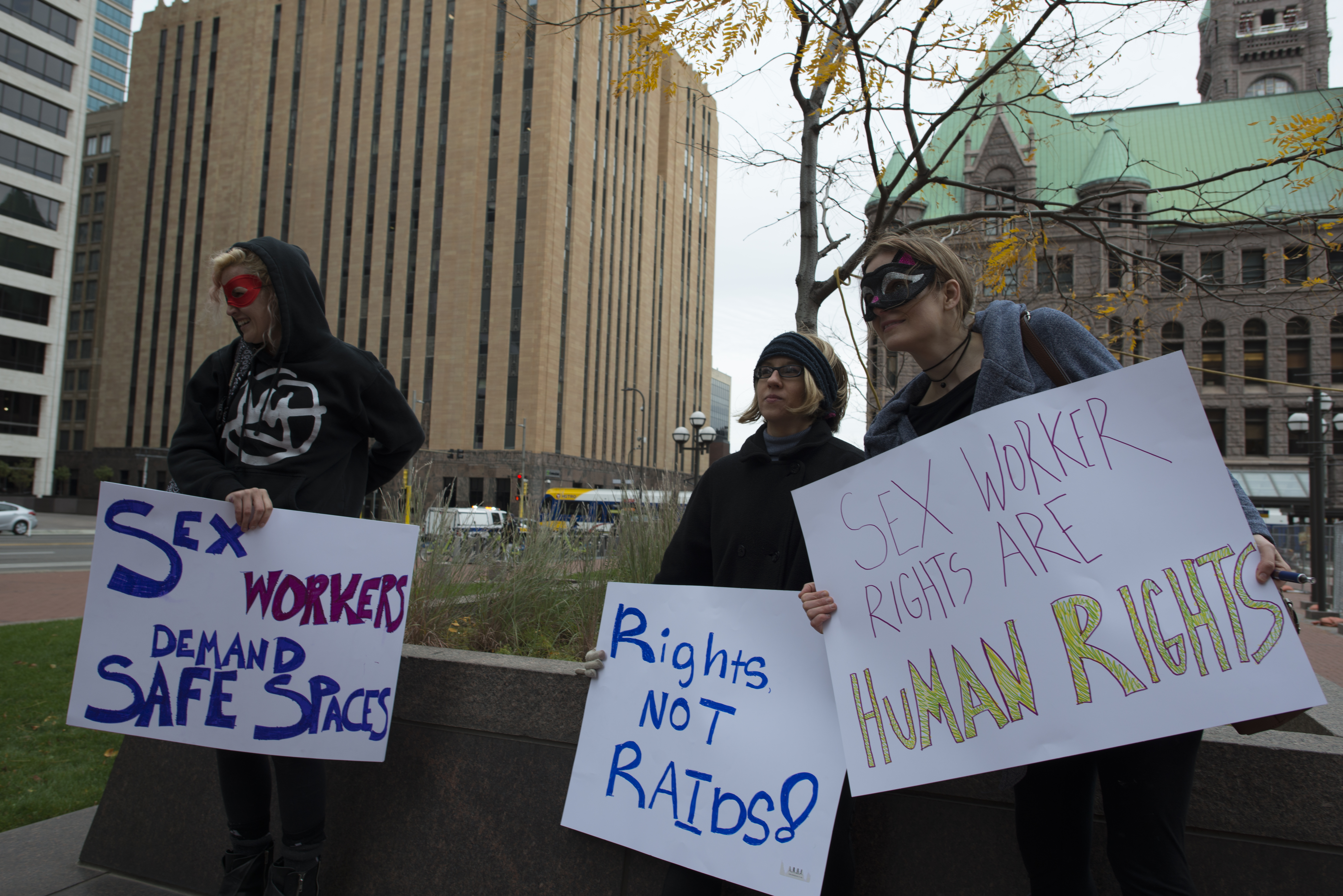

===== Hawaii =====
A decision by the House and the Senate in Hawaii is expected in May 2014 after police agreed in March 2014 not to oppose the revision of a law that was implemented in the 1970s, allowing undercover police officers to engage in sexual relations with sex workers during the course of investigations. Following initial protest from supporters of the legislation, all objections were retracted on March 25, 2014. A Honolulu police spokeswoman informed TIME magazine that, at the time of the court's decision, no reports had been made regarding the abuse of the exemption by police.

The Pacifica Alliance to Stop Slavery and other advocates explained that the fear of retribution is the main deterrent for sex workers who seek to report offending officers. At a Hawaiian Senate Judiciary Committee hearing in March 2014, an attorney testified that his client was raped three times by Hawaiian police before prostitution was cited as the reason for her subsequent arrest.

===== Nevada =====
Barbara Brents and Kathryn Hausbeck state in their study that the legalization of prostitution in Nevada's brothels allows for improved regulation and protection for both businesses and workers. Academic Ronald Weitzer supports this idea by citing the impact of the numerous safety measures that ensure the safety of the workers.

Brents and Hausbeck's case study of Nevada's brothels entailed examples of how they believe protection mechanisms were designed to account for the entire process of each individual job—that is the time that a sex worker is with a customer. They started by saying that the negotiation process for sex workers in Nevada requires the use of an intercom during the process so that workers will not betray the business owners and so that owners can know if the customers are putting the workers at risk. After the price is negotiated, the money is paid and taken out of the room by the sex worker. At that point, the sex workers have the opportunity to let security guards know if there is anything unsafe or uncomfortable about the situation so that security can be alerted. Another protection mechanism requires security to interrupt the workers after the allotted period of time to demand that the customers either leave or renegotiate the price, so that sex workers are not coerced or forced into providing additional services without a fee. Finally, the study concludes that sex workers are offered protection from clients in brothels because of strictly enforced rules and the relationships that brothels have been able to build with local law enforcement officials. According to some legalization supporters, this protection creates an environment that can be empowering for women to work in.

Additionally, proponents argue that workers must also comply with health regulations and engage in preventative practices. They state that this compliance leads to a system that becomes mutually advantageous for brothels and sex workers because the perception of safety by workers is profitable for the brothel. In brothels in Nevada, it is a requirement for sex workers to be tested and verified as healthy. Afterward, they are required to be checked periodically for certain STIs. Condom usage is also mandatory, and this is advertised by the brothels. Finally, sex workers are able to examine the customers before any services are given to make sure there are no signs of visible STIs. If there are any suspicions, the worker is allowed to refund the customer and refuse service.

== Risks associated with sex work ==
=== Sexually transmitted infections (STIs) ===
In countries where sex work is either criminalized or illegal or both, there is a risk that sexual workers may contract a sexually transmitted infection (STI) due to their labor. They may also contract STIs from coercion or rape. In addition, the World Health Organization states that sex workers have been known to be refused health services when seeking out disease prevention and treatment because of the nature of their occupation. Furthermore, sex workers in these countries are generally afraid to seek out health services for problems.

Trans women who are sex workers are at particular risk for HIV. The seroprevalence of HIV among trans women sex workers internationally has been estimated at 27.3 percent. Furthermore, sex work is prevalent amongst transgender people, particularly young trans women.

In Cambodia, a report studied the prevalence of HIV among a group of indirect sex workers in Cambodia called "beer promotion girls", women employed by distributors to promote and sell beers. The study found that they have the highest rate of HIV, probably because they often sell sex as a means of supplementing their salary. It concluded by explaining how disease prevention campaigns often target direct sex workers and neglect the women who are also at risk of contracting STIs.

=== Physical violence ===
The World Health Organization report says that criminalization creates an environment where women are less likely to report crimes against them, and accept the possibility of violence such as rape, murder, beatings, and kidnapping as a part of the job description. The report also states that sex workers are even at risk of being harassed, humiliated, and coerced into sex with local law enforcement. Another study concludes that the rates of victimization of prostitutes are not nearly as high as some studies claim.

On April 11, 2018, the United States Congress passed the Stop Enabling Sex Traffickers Act, commonly known as FOSTA-SESTA, which imposes severe penalties on online platforms that facilitate sex work. The act resulted in the closure of the classified advertising website Backpage and led to the arrest of its founders. The effectiveness of the act has come into question, and there have been allegations that it has endangered sex workers and has been ineffective in catching and stopping sex traffickers.

Studies undertaken by the Red Umbrella have shown that by banning websites that enable sex workers to solicit clients, meaning many sex workers have no alternative to working on the street or with a procurement agent such as a pimp, where they are far more likely to encounter danger. For instance, when soliciting online, the sex worker can perform background checks such as checking the phone number against a database of abusers. On the street, there are no such protections in place. Additionally, whilst soliciting for themselves, the sex worker can pick and choose who they see, but a third party procurement agent may not offer this choice.

=== Psychological violence ===
Some sex workers are subjected to psychological manipulation by traffickers using a mix of violence and tenderness. Sex workers in these relationships can develop Stockholm syndrome toward their abusers and refuse to testify against them. New York County District Attorney Cyrus Vance Jr. said that such sex workers "are often emotionally and economically dependent upon their abusers, and remain silent as their worlds grow smaller and more dangerous". However, for some, the refusal to testify against their traffickers is for other reasons, such as fear of retaliation, distrust of law enforcement, etc.

=== Impacts of COVID-19 ===
In 2020, the COVID-19 global pandemic greatly impacted female entrepreneurs' safety who are working outside the formal economy in sex work. The two main impacts to safety were the inability to physically distance and the exclusion of government economic support because of their lack of perceived income on paper.

== Advocacy ==
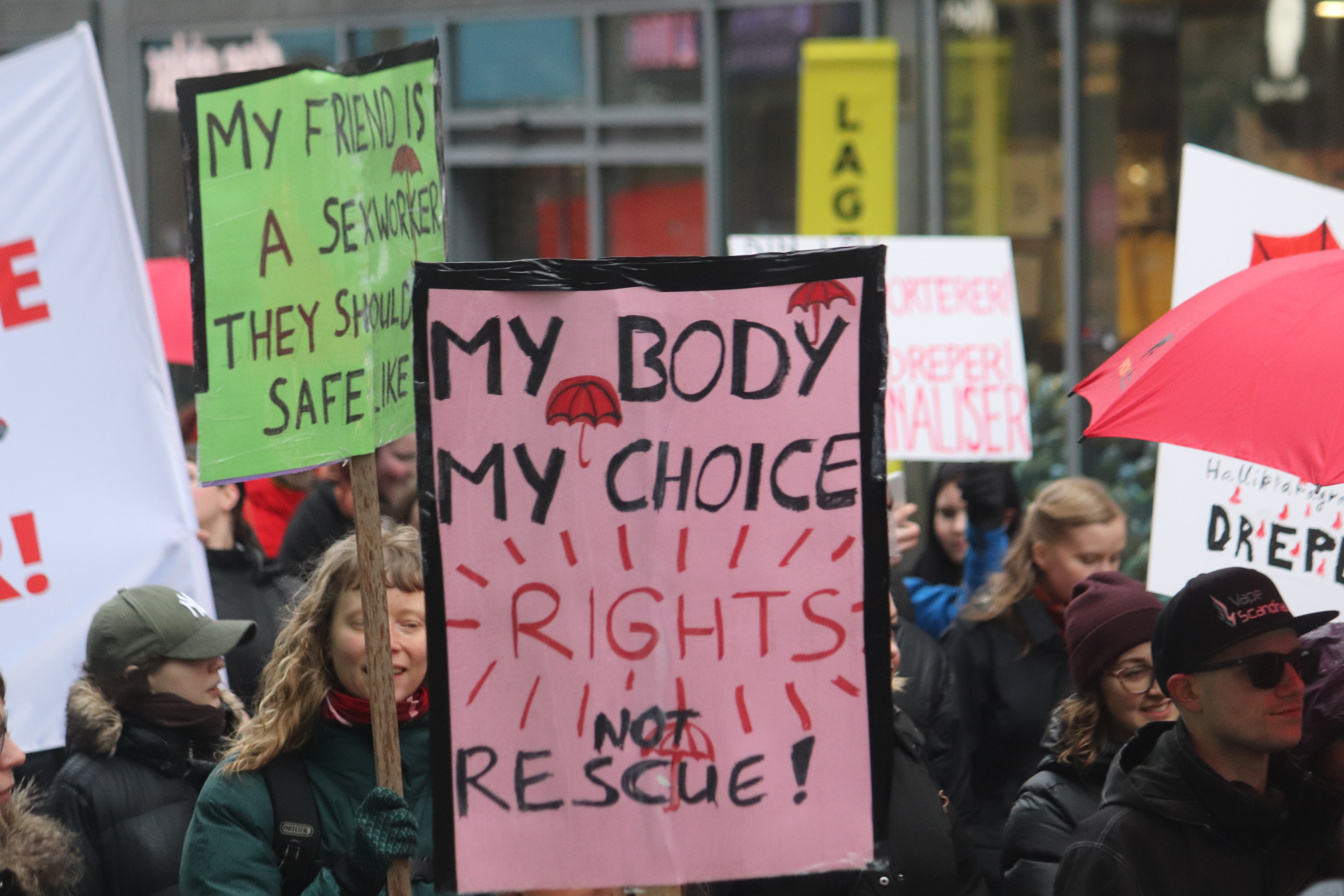
International Women's Day in 2020 in Oslo

Sex worker activists, including many libertarian organizations such as the Reason Foundation and the Libertarian Party in the United States, argue that sex workers should have the same basic human and labor rights as other working people. According to Jacqueline Comte, there are three different stances when it comes to the issues around sex work: abolitionism, sex-positive feminism, and decriminalization. She argues that decriminalization is the best stance based on her found research. This will allow for better working conditions, police protection, and less violence against sex workers.

In June 2014, the Government of Canada tried to pass Bill C. 36, which would criminalize the purchase or advertising of sexual services. Organizations like Stella l'amie de Maimie tried to put pressure on people to vote against the bill. They argue that criminalization will have negative impacts, like increased violence, more coercion, and human trafficking. Part of this organization is about free condom distribution and information and tools by and for sex workers. Sonagachi is a project in India that is known for its HIV prevention. They promote consistent condom use.

Another viewpoint that some activists take is legalization, which would allow sex workers to undertake their work in organized circumstances (e. g., legal brothels), where standard industry practices (e.g., practicing condom use and regular health check-ups for sex workers) could reduce the transmission of HIV and other STIs. During the COVID-19 pandemic, the Supreme Court of India passed instructions to all state governments to provide dry rations to sex workers.

== The red umbrella ==
The red umbrella is the most widely recognized symbol of sex workers' rights.

The red umbrella symbol was introduced by sex workers in Venice, Italy, in 2001, as part of the 49th Venice Biennale of Art. Sex workers also held a street demonstration, the Red Umbrellas March, in Venice to protest inhumane work conditions and human rights abuses. The International Committee on the Rights of Sex Workers in Europe adopted the red umbrella as a symbol of resistance to discrimination in 2005.

For International Women's Day in March 2014, sex worker organizations and activists throughout the world used the red umbrella in activities of celebration and protest. For example, flash mob events in which the red umbrella was used were held in Sydney, Australia; London, UK; Bochum, Germany; Thailand; the Netherlands; and Peru.

== Movement ==
The sex workers' rights movement began in the 1970s and, in many countries, works to improve working conditions, increase benefits and eliminate discrimination on behalf of individuals working within the sex industry, whether legal or criminalized.

The International Committee for Prostitutes' Rights gained human rights coverage in 1985 when they obtained the World Charter for Prostitutes Rights. This movement continued to grow globally. The Global Network of Sex Work Projects was created in 1992 at the International AIDS Conference in Amsterdam. The majority of the Sex Workers' Rights Movements' progress pertains to developed countries.

=== International organizations ===
==== Global Network of Sex Work Projects ====
Global Network of Sex Work Projects (NSWP) is an organization that was founded in 1990 by sex workers from different nations at the 2nd International Conference for NGOs working on AIDS in Paris, France. The organization has received financial support from bodies such as the Open Society Foundations and states that it "conducts a mix of pro-active and re-active policy advocacy". NSWP is largely responsible for making the increasing usage of the term "sex worker" instead of "prostitute". The organization's advocacy work has included HIV/AIDS, addressing sex worker discrimination, and participating in research about the profession. NSWP created the publication, Research for Sex Work.

During the 2012 International AIDS Conference, held in Kolkata, India, sex worker activists from different countries formed the Sex Worker Freedom Festival (SWFF) as an alternative event for sex workers and allies. The week-long festival included activity in the Sonagachi red-light area and represented a protest against the exclusion of sex workers. The event has been held in Washington, D.C., US.

==== World Health Organization ====
The World Health Organization has released a report focusing on the violence that sex workers face and their vulnerability to HIV/AIDS. It included currently used intervention strategies as well as policy recommendations from the WHO Sex Work Toolkit. Furthermore, another report addressing HIV prevention in middle- to low-income countries was released with policy guidelines based on research conducted by the organization which recommended that sex work be decriminalized and called for the elimination of unjust application of non-criminal laws and regulations against sex workers.

==== United Nations Human Rights Council ====
The 2024 UN Human Rights Council report affirms that criminalizing sex work creates the very environments governments claim to deter through policies and criminalization. The report calls for the full decriminalization of consensual adult sex work, drawing attention to how current laws exacerbate exploitation through unsafe conditions, increase in police violence, and block access to health care. The report also states that governments have a responsibility to make sure sex workers can access safety, medical support, and legal protection without fear of discrimination as a result of work they do.

The UN makes clear that the experiences of discrimination are felt differently. Indigenous, migrant, trans, and racialized sex workers face the harshest of conditions, from over-policing to structural barriers that have greater impacts on their safety. The report flags how anti-trafficking policies are weaponized, through justifying raids and forced interventions against sex workers, highlighting how merging consensual sex work with human trafficking fails to confront real cases of exploitation.

==== UNAIDS ====
UNAIDS has written a report with policy suggestions in Asia and the Pacific that includes case studies to support ways to improve access to health services in Asia and the Pacific. The UN released a development report titled Sex Work and the Law in Asia and the Pacific discussing the policies surrounding sex work in Asian and Pacific countries. Some of the report's policy recommendations for governments included decriminalizing sex work and activities associated with it, providing sex workers with work-related protections, and supporting sex workers' access to health services.

They have also released a 2011–2015 strategy report titled Getting to Zero that aims for the vision of "Zero new HIV infections. Zero discrimination. Zero AIDS-related deaths". The report states that its goals include reducing HIV transmission by half, getting universal access to antiretroviral therapy for those living with HIV, and reducing the number of countries with punitive laws around HIV transmission, sex work, drug use, or homosexual activity by half all by 2015.

==== International Labour Organization ====
The International Labour Organization (ILO) has also released reports suggesting policies. Most of the reports deal with ways to decrease the number of workers that contract HIV/AIDS. It also supports the "Getting to Zero" mission. Its primary policy initiative is Recommendation 200. The publication discusses some of the different ways that they have implemented programs that target both sex workers and their clients in different countries worldwide. Another report released by the ILO examines sex work in Cambodia by evaluating direct and indirect sex work in various settings and case studies with sex workers to conclude with policy suggestions.

==== Amnesty International ====
In August 2015, Amnesty International called for the worldwide decriminalisation of sex work as the best way to improve the human rights of sex workers. In May 2016, it published its policy calling on governments around the world to decriminalise consensual sex work and rejecting the Nordic model.

=== Regional organizations ===
==== Australia ====
Scarlet Alliance is the peak body for sex worker organizations in Australia and campaigns for the full decriminalization of sex work, in addition to providing HIV/AIDS outreach and education to sex workers. The country has been credited with better sex worker occupational health and safety, high condom use, and the lowest STI and HIV rates around the world.

==== Africa ====
In South Africa, the Sex Workers Education and Advocacy Taskforce, founded in 1994 and located in Cape Town, has provided education and public health services to sex workers. They also lobby for the decriminalization of sex work, and began a research program in 2003.

==== Asia & Pacific ====
The Asia Pacific Network of Sex Workers (APNSW) was formed in 1994 to provide direct support to Asian sex workers. Australian-born sex worker activist Andrew Hunter was a contributor to the growth of the Global Network of Sex Work Projects (NSWP).

In India, the Mahila Samanwaya Committee was founded in Kolkata in 1995. From 1995 to 1997, the number of those associated with the committee grew to around 30,000, mainly consisting of sex workers from West Bengal. In Sonagachi, the Mahila Samanwaya Committee held rallies against yearly police raids aimed at sex workers. In Israel, in 2018, Argaman, a grassroots organization that aims to protect the rights of sex workers, was established in Israel. In Japan, the Sex Work And Sexual Health (SWASH) opposes slavery and exploitation. Most recently, sex workers have fought for inclusion in the government handouts for the unemployed due to COVID-19.

==== Europe ====
TAMPEP is an organization that was founded in 1993. It focused on the public health needs of those workers in Central and Eastern Europe. It also examines the legislative framework that sex work takes place within. Some of the outreach methods used to assist sex workers include outreach and education and cultural and peer mediators.

In France, in 1975, 100 sex workers occupied Saint-Nizier church in Lyon to protest against poor working conditions. In the United Kingdom, the English Collective of Prostitutes was founded in 1975, and later the Network for Sex Work Projects (NSWP) was founded in the 1990s. Based in London, United Kingdom, the NSWP serves as an information exchange for 40 projects and operations across the world.

==== North America ====
In the United States: Carol Leigh coined the expression sex workers in 1978.

==== Latin America and the Caribbean ====
In 1888, a group of sex workers, Las Horizontales, published the newspaper La Cebolla. Founded in Havana, Cuba, it is the first known sex worker organization. While it claimed to be edited by sex workers, scholars have raised doubts about that claim. The Association of Autonomous Female Workers (AAFW), founded in Ecuador in 1982, is a sex workers' organisation in South America that was operated by healthcare workers, feminists, and sex workers. Uruguayan women in the sex trade were said to be the first to organize in 1986. This was then followed by two Brazilian sex workers by the names of Lourdes Barreto and Gabriela Leite holding the first national conference for sex work in 1987. In 1988, sex workers from the AAFW protested against the poor conditions in which they worked in the sex industry.

As of 2019, there are two regional networks for sex workers' rights in Latin America and the Caribbean: the Latin American Platform of People Who Exercise Sex Work (Spanish: Plataforma Latinoamericana de Personas que Ejercen el Trabajo Sexual — PLAPERTS) and Network of Women Sex Workers in Latin America and the Caribbean (Spanish: Red de Mujeres Trabajadoras Sexuales de Latinoamérica y el Caribe — RedTraSex). RedTraSex was founded in 1997 in Heredia, Costa Rica. In Latin America, the sex worker identification card that has been issued in Bolivia. In 2013, the organization had influenced policy in certain countries and has interacted with the presidents Rafael Correa of Ecuador and Luiz Inácio Lula da Silva in Brazil.

== Dates of significance ==
=== March 3: International Sex Workers' Rights Day ===
This day began when over 25,000 sex workers gathered in India for a festival organized by a Calcutta-based group called Durbar Mahila Samanwaya Committee (Unstoppable Women's Synthesis Committee) despite protests pressuring the government to revoke the permit for the parade in 2001.

=== June 2: International Sex Workers' Day ===
This day began June 2, 1975, in Lyon, France, when a group of sex workers met in a church to express their anger about exploitative living conditions and the criminalization they face because of their work.

=== August 3: China Sex Worker Day ===
In 2009, the Chinese Grassroots Women's Rights Center designated this day to fight the discrimination that faces Chinese sex workers.

=== December 17: International Day to End Violence against Sex Workers ===
In 2003, Anne Sprinkle founded the Sex Workers Outreach Project USA and held a vigil on this day for the victims of the Green River Killer, and this day has been commemorated ever since as the International Day to End Violence Against Sex Workers.

== See also ==
- Decriminalization of sex work
- Girl power
- List of sex worker organizations
- Prostitution law
- Sex industry
- Sex-positive feminism
- Sex-positive movement
- Sex worker movements
- Sexual and reproductive health and rights
- Transgender sex worker
- Women's rights
- Women's empowerment
