= Las Horizontales =

19th-century sex workers in Havana, Cuba

Las Horizontales were a group of sex workers in Havana, Cuba during the late 19th century that produced a newspaper, La Cebolla (1888). Gender studies scholar and Cuba expert, Amalia Cabezas identified this as the first documented sex worker organization in the Americas.

== Emergence ==
Las Horizontales emerged in response to new legislation that both taxed and required sex workers to submit to gynecological exams. In their newspaper La Cebolla, they make reference to the fact that they were not eligible to vote and yet were still required to pay taxes. They complain about police extortion, being sent to the city's outskirts, and the government not recognizing their rights as women and workers who paid taxes.

== La Cebolla ==
23 September 1888 issue of La Cebolla

The women who wrote issues of La Cebolla used pseudonyms, like La Madrileña, and La Isleña. Therefore some scholars have expressed doubts about the identity of the actual authors of La Cebolla articles. Based on her archival research, Beatriz Calvo Pena argues it was Victorino Reineri Jimeno, an anarchist journalist, who wrote all La Cebolla articles.

In the four issues of La Cebolla that Las Horizontales published, they make reference to issues of colonialism, slavery, police brutality, and homosexuality.

"The time has come for us to not tolerate with our silence those unjust fines imposed on us, sometimes because we do not want to give in to the lustful whims of the police, other times because we do not loosen the money he asks us for. Already the ominous time of take it and shut up has passed, not to return." (quoted and translated in Rodriguez, 2023, p. 79)

One issue includes a poem that describes a lesbian relationship that threatens the mayor's throat if he messes with her girlfriend.

La gachí que yo camelo

si el Arcalde la multara

Le cortaba el tragadero

Aunque a Ceuta me mandaran (no. 2, p. 4) (quoted in Calvo Peña

2005, 26)

[The girl that I desire

If the Mayor fines her

I will cut his throat

Even if they send me to Ceuta] (quoted and translated in Rodriguez, 2023, p. 79)

== See also ==
- Prostitution in Cuba
- Sex worker movements
