= Stella, l'amie de Maimie =

Organization for sex workers in Montreal

Stella I'amie de Maimie
- Stella, I'amie de Maimie
- Founded at: Montréal, Canada
- Type: Non-governmental organization, community organization
- Legal status: Organization
- Purpose: Promote the welfare of sex workers, educate and inform about sex workers
- Headquarters: Montréal, Canada
- Location: Montréal, Canada
- Official language: English, French
- Key people: Maimie Pinzer
- Website: https://chezstella.org/en/home/

Stella, l’amie de Maimie (also known as Chez Stella) is a Canadian non-governmental organization and community-based organization established and run by, and for, sex workers in Montreal, Canada. It offers information for woman-identified sex workers, such as street workers, escorts, strippers, intimate massage parlor workers, pornographic actresses, or erotic phone-call operators. The organization is designed to attend to the welfare of sex workers, and educate the public about sex work.

== Presentation ==
Stella, l’amie de Maimie is the only community group in Montreal that works exclusively and specifically with sex workers. Established in 1995, this community organization, created "by and for" its members, is dedicated to enhancing the quality of life and working conditions for all women-identified sex workers in Montreal. Through its programs, the organization advocates for good health practices and upholds the human rights of sex workers. Emphasizing empowerment and solidarity, the organization actively supports individual and collective responsibility among sex workers in all its initiatives. Stella serves all kinds of sex workers and maintains an ongoing presence in sex work venues, including streets, escort agencies, massage parlors and strip bars.

The organization initially started with a founding board of four employees and a dedicated group of volunteers and sympathizers. There is no specific religious affiliation within this organization. Stella participants are active on a number of committees, coalitions, research groups and boards of directors. Stella representatives are often invited to give lectures at conferences highlighting issues related to sex work. The organization is also regularly invited to participate in artistic projects and events in Montreal. For example, in 2001, Stella took part in Six personnages en quête d'auteur, a play directed by Wajdi Mouawad at the Théâtre de Quatre'sous.

Stella works at the municipal, provincial and national level to promote sex workers' rights, and also at the international level where it has affiliated with sex worker rights groups all over the world to fight for the same cause—the decriminalization of sex work. As explained in the "Dear Client" guide, one of the most asked questions is "Why do sex workers do sex work?" The answer given by the organization Stella is "Sex work is work: an activity that generates income. Sex workers work first and foremost for money".

== History ==
Stella was born in 1995 after the work of a consultative committee set up by the AIDS Study Center in collaboration with the AQTTS (L’association Québécoise des travailleuses et travailleurs du sexe), some community-based organization representatives (Centre-ville et Centre-Sud de Montréal) and doctors in epidemiology. The sex workers involved in the committee's work on HIV prevention suggested that the best way to reduce HIV is to improve the life conditions and work conditions of sex workers.

To that end, Stella opened its doors in April 1995 to specifically support cisgender and transgender women working in the sex industry, including street workers, escorts, porn actress, and erotic dancers. Stella set up a participative structure where current or former sex workers would have a major input at every level of the organization - as volunteers, members of the administration council or just a members of the working team. Stella acknowledges that their knowledge and experience are invaluable for developing actions and tools that best suit the specific needs of all sex workers.

== Objectives ==
According to their website, the main goals of Stella are:

- To counteract violence against sex workers;
- To fight discrimination, isolation and the stigmatization lived by the sex workers;
- To promote the total decriminalization of the different kinds of sex works;
- To provide support and information to sex workers so that sex workers may live in safety and with dignity;
- To educate and educate the public about sex work and the realities faced by sex workers;
- To encourage and support the participation of sex workers in the community and in collective actions;
- To promote the involvement of sex workers in decisions made about sex workers at the municipal, provincial, national and international level.

Stella promotes empowerment and solidarity by and amongst sex workers, and believes that every sex worker has an important place in society, and human rights worth defending.

== Current activities ==
Stella is an ongoing organization that works in different levels of society to promote new understanding of the sex industry for sex workers and for the general public. It goes from helping sex workers to fight hepatitis or HIV, to publishing magazines, doing workshops for students or sex workers, working with the government for the decriminalization of the sex industry in Montreal and internationally to helping sex workers to get some work experience within a social justice organization.

The current activities are divided into two different sections: information and outreach. The following offers a summary of each.

=== Information ===
Stella has a number of activities that are focused on welcoming, supporting and informing sex workers. All of these are available through a number of community-based organizations situated in the hot spots for street prostitution in Montreal. Services include:

- phone line
- drop in community meals
- medical clinics (2X per month in collaboration with Medecin du Monde, tracking, vaccination hepatitis A and B, gynecologists)
- free vaccination clinics for hepatitis A and B in bars and detentions building
- legal clinics at Stella's offices
- visits to sex workers in prison
- programs of educative and community activities at Stella's locals

Stella also provides sex workers with support through the judicial process, social services and health services.

=== Outreach ===
Stella supports a number of outreach programs that go out into the environment where sex workers live and work. For example:

- districts where there is a concentration of street prostitution
- hotels and bars where the prostitutes or escorts recruit/bring their clients
- bars with erotic dancers
- restaurants and coffee shops where the sex workers take their breaks
- escorts agencies, massage parlors, and sex workers' apartments where they receive clients
- places where the prostitutes toxicomane squat
- pornographic film sets
- incarceration buildings (federal and provincial)

==== Goals of outreach ====
- To provide services to sex workers in the community
- To mobilize sex workers for collective action efforts (actions, Forum XXX, International AIDS conferences)
- To research and to analyze sex worker activities especially HIV/AIDS prevention efforts (this program is in collaboration with university and community partners)
- To create workshops to educate community organizations, politicians, students, outreach workers, social workers and anyone in the general public who works with sex workers

=== Publications ===
Stella prepares a number of publications of interest to sex workers including:

- Constellation, a free magazine for sex workers
- Bulletin Stellaire
- Hepatitis C brochure
- Clients' guide
- Violence prevention brochure
- Guide XXX
- Striptease guide

Stella also manages a website with all resources available electronically. All publications are bilingual and the Hepatitis C and the clients' guide are trilingual (French, English and Inuktitut).

As an example of its usage, here is a part of the latest ConStellation editorial magazine. "By taking the initiative to produce a ConStellation that addresses the 7 major sectors of the sex industry through interviews with women who work in the pornography, erotic massage, street prostitution, domination, webcam, erotic dancing and the world of escorts, the Stella team has killed two birds with one stone. In addition to giving us a chance to share our knowledge about business and providing us with the opportunity to learn from each other, this ConStellation also presents a faithful portrait of the sex industry, with all that this implies, in North America today."

This proves an example of the use and the importance of these publications; to inform the general public and the sex workers from the sex industry about good tips, and share their experience of this sometimes challenging job.

=== Public outreach ===
The last part of Stella's work for the improvement of the sex workers' lives is more focused on the sensitizing of the general public and the interveners from the health care system and the social services as much as the policemen and policewomen to the problems and the realities and the preoccupations that the sex workers may have. For example, this sensitizing could be done through meetings with students or interested groups that want to have more information, by holding an information desk in major conferences or forums or to have a public conference or many more public activities. It could also be by the writing of activity reports or community media mass articles.

This social justice organization also does a lot of information work of sensitizing to the shop owners, the people living in hot areas to participate actively in the different conversation tables of the districts and the group of organizations by themes.

All of these services are offered by employee and volunteer teams composed mostly by either sex workers or former sex workers.

== Current organizational features ==
As explained in the introduction, Stella started with only four employers and many volunteers; today on average twelve women work full-time for Stella and the membership continues to grow. There are many volunteers and sympathizers helping to write articles, draw the pictures for the publication, some also provide names for the List of assaults and many of the volunteers work on the streets (outreach) to help other sex workers.

The board of directors is formed of nine people, including an executive with a president, a vice president, and a treasurer.

Funding for Stella activities comes from various sources including public and private funds, donations and fundraising efforts with project support from provincial, municipal and private bodies.

== Bibliography ==
- Stella, l’amie de Maimie. 2009. Editorial. Constellation, Special Working Conditions, April 10. (Available online: http://www.chezstella.org/stella/?q=en/constellation2009 (accessed February 20)).
- Stella, l’amie de Maimie. 2004. Dear Client, Manual intended for clients of sex workers. Montréal.
- Stella, l’amie de Maimie. 2009. Stella, l’amie de Maimie, official website. http://www.chezstella.org/. (accessed February 13).
- Tremblay, Francine. 2001. L’individu dans la modernité—Georges Herbert Mead, Charles Taylor and Alain Touraine. MA Thesis, Concordia University. (Available online: http://spectrum.library.concordia.ca/1521/1/MQ64034.pdf (accessed February 27)).
