= List of sex worker organizations =

This is a list of organizations which advocate for sex workers' rights. Almost all sex worker organizations around the world favour the decriminalization of sex work, and have that goal as a primary objective. These organizations also encourage active involvement from sex workers to support advocacy, fundraising, and public education efforts. In locations where sex work is not criminalized, sex worker movements advocate for access to other kinds of rights such as unemployment, changes in zoning, and working to eliminate the social stigma attached to sexual labor.

== International ==
Name and abbreviation	Founded	Region served	Notes
African Sex Workers Alliance (ASWA)	2009	Africa	Founded in Johannesburg, South Africa; based in Nairobi, Kenya.
Asia Pacific Network of Sex Workers (APNSW)	1994	Asia	Based in Bangkok, Thailand.
Caribbean Sex Workers Coalition (CSWC)		Caribbean	Based in Berbice, Guyana.
Caribbean Vulnerable Communities	2005	Caribbean	Based in Kingston, Jamaica.
East Africa Sex Workers Alliance (EASWA)	2018	East Africa	Coalition of sex workers organizations, networks, and groups in East Africa. Based in Dar es Salaam, Tanzania.
Global Network of Sex Work Projects (NSWP)	1990	World	Based in Edinburgh, Scotland.
European Sex Workers' Rights Alliance (ESWA)	1985	Europe; Central Asia	Based in Amsterdam, Netherlands. Previously known as the International Committee for Prostitutes' Rights (ICPR, 1985–2005) and the International Committee on the Rights of Sex Workers in Europe (ICRSE, 2005–2021). Published the World Charter for Prostitutes' Rights at its 1985 founding.
Plataforma LatinoAmerica de Personas que EjeRcen el Trabajo Sexual (PLAPERTS)	2014	Latin America	Based in Machala, Ecuador.
Red Umbrella Fund (RUF)	2012	World	Amsterdam-based fund making grants to sex workers' rights groups worldwide.
Sex Trade Workers Industrial Union 690	1995	World	Branch of the Industrial Workers of the World (IWW) based in Chicago, United States.
Sex Workers' Rights Advocacy Network for Central and Eastern Europe and Central Asia (SWAN)	2006	Eurasia	
TAMPEP (European Network for HIV/STI Prevention and Health Promotion among Migrant Sex Workers)	1993	Europe	Based in Amsterdam, Netherlands. Hosted from Helsinki, Finland.

=== Supportive ===
These international organizations are not primarily led by sex workers, nor do their activities primarily concern sex work, but nonetheless, they have dedicated a significant portion of their efforts to advocating for sex workers' rights, including decriminalization. Literature describes such supportive organizations as "allies".

Name and abbreviation	Support since	Region served	Notes
Amnesty International (AI)	2015	World	London-based human rights organisation that has advocated for decriminalisation of consensual sex work since 2015.
Commissioner for Human Rights	2024	Europe	Institution of the Council of Europe (CoE), stated in a 2024 Human Rights Comment that sex work should be decriminalised.
Global Alliance Against Traffic in Women (GAATW)	1994 (start)	World	Bangkok-based anti-trafficking coalition, has distinguished between sex work and trafficking "since its inception".
Human Rights Watch (HRW)	2014 (at least)	World	New York City–based human rights organisation that has advocated for decriminalisation of voluntary sex work since at least 2014.
ILGA World	2019	World	Geneva-based international coalition of over 1,500 LGBTI organisations, called for the decriminalisation of sex work in 2019.
International Commission of Jurists (ICJ)	2023	World	Geneva-based international human rights NGO of jurists. Principle 17 of The 8 March Principles (2023) stipulated decriminalising sex work.
La Strada International (LSI)	1995	Europe	Amsterdam-based anti-trafficking organisation, has decriminalisation as a "strategic focus area".
The Lancet	2014 (at least)	World	Global medical journal, at least since its 2014 series "HIV and sex workers".
UNAIDS	2012	World	UN program to counter the HIV/AIDS pandemic, per the 2012 new WHO guidelines.
United Nations Population Fund (UNFPA)	2012	World	UN agency for reproductive and maternal health, per the 2012 new WHO guidelines.
UN Working Group on the issue of Discrimination; Against Women in Law and in Practice (WGDAW)	2016	World	Women's rights experts at the Human Rights Council, recommended decriminalising sex work in April 2016 report.
World Health Organization (WHO)	2012	World	UN agency for international public health, per the 2012 new WHO guidelines.

== Africa ==
=== Angola ===
Name	Founded	Region served	Notes
ASSC NGO		Angola	Works with sex workers, their clients, and brothel owners. Based in Luanda.
Doces Para Sempre-SW		Angola	Works with sex workers, their families, clients, and brothel owners. Based in Luanda.

=== Benin ===
Name	Founded	Region served	Notes
Association Solidarite		Benin	Based in Cotonou, the organisation works with sex workers, their families and clients.

=== Botswana ===
Name	Founded	Region served	Notes
Pilot Mathambo Centre for Men's Health	2011	Botswana	Male sex worker organisation.
Sisonke Botswana		Botswana	Sex worker led organisation based in Gaborone.

=== Burkina Faso ===
Name	Founded	Region served	Notes
Association Kamb béog Neere Yinga		Burkina Faso	Sex worker led organisation based in Ouagadougou.
Association Yerelon+	1999	Burkina Faso	The organisations works with female and TS sex workers, their families and clients. Based in Ouagadougou.

=== Burundi ===
Name	Founded	Region served	Notes
Rural Women Initiatives for Self-Empowerment (RWISE)	2016	Burundi	Based in Cankuzo, the organisation works with sex workers in rural areas.
Solidarite Pour Les Droits Des Travailleuses De Sexe		Burundi	Based in Bujumbura.

=== Cameroon ===
Name	Founded	Region served	Notes
Aids-ACODEV-Cameroon	2009	Douala	The organisation work with female, male and transvestite sex workers, their clients and children of sex workers. Originally named Acodes Cameroon Sex Workers.
Alcondoms Cameroun		Cameroon	Based in Yaounde, the organisation works towards reducing the risks associated with drug use.
Avenir Jeune de l'Ouest (AJO)		West Region	Based in Bafoussam, the organisation works with female, male and transgender sex workers.
CAMEF Cameroon	2010	Southwest Region	The organisation works with male, female and transgender sex workers and is based in Limbe.
Psychologues Du Monde Afrique		Cameroon	Branch of the international NGO Psychologues Du Monde and based in Bafoussam.

=== Central African Republic ===
Name	Founded	Region served	Notes
UMOJA	2016	South Ubangi	Organisation led by and for male sex workers in rural areas.

=== Democratic Republic of the Congo ===
Name	Founded	Region served	Notes
AHUSADEC (Action Humanitaire pour la Sante et Developpement Communautaire)		Eastern DRC	Based in Bukavu. UNODC and PNMLS partner.
ALCIS (Action pour la lutte Contre L'ignorance du SIDA)	1999	DRC	Based in Bukavu. UNAIDS Red Ribbon Award winner.
Débout Fille		DRC	Based in Baraka.
DRC AID		DRC	Based in Bukavu.
FERAPAD - Femmes Rurales Amies de la Paix et du Développement	2008	Fizi Territory	The organisation works with sex workers who work in rural and mining areas.
GFV-VIH (Groupement Des Femmes Vivant Avec Le VIH)		Eastern DRC	Based in Bukavu, the organisation is led by and provides support for sex workers who are HIV positive.
HODSAS (Homme Pour le Droit et La Sante Sexuelle)		DRC	Led by and provides support to gay and transgender sex workers.
Mouvement Pour la Promotion du Respect et Egalite des Droits et Sante (MOPREDS)		DRC	Based in Goma and work with male and female sex workers.
Solidarite Des Jeunes Filles Pour L'education Et L'integration Socioprofessionnelle (SOJFEP)	2011	Democratic Republic of the Congo	The organisation works with young sex workers in mining areas.
UMANDE		Eastern DRC	Based in South Kivu and work with female and transgender sex workers.

=== Ethiopia ===
Name	Founded	Region served	Notes
Nikat Charitable Association	2006	Ethiopia	Based in Addis Ababa, the organisation was originally named Nikat Women's Association.

=== Ghana ===
Name	Founded	Region served	Notes
CAFAF (Community And Family Aid Foundation)	2006	Ghana	Based in Accra.

=== Kenya ===
Name	Founded	Region served	Notes
Achievers Plight Self Help Group		Kisumu	Sex worker led organisation in the slum suburb of Nyalenda.
Arms To Lean On (ATLO)	2020	Embu	The organisation works with male sex workers and was born out of the MARPS programme of the University of Nairobi.
Bar Hostess Empowerment and Support Programme	1998	Kenya	Sex worker led organisation based in Nairobi that work with female, male, lesbian and transgender sex workers.
Coast Sex Workers Alliance (COSWA-Kenya)		Coast Province	Based in Mombasa.
HOYMAS (Health Options for Young Men on HIV/AIDS/STI)	2009	Kenya	Male sex work led organisation that is an Aidfonds partner.
Jeunes Feministes Engagees Pour Le Changement		Kenya	Based in Malindi.
KESWA (Kenya Sex Workers Alliance)	2010	Kenya	Umbrella body of sex workers organizations in Kenya.
Kisauni Peer Educators		Mombasa	Female, male and transgender sex worker organisation in the Kisauni suburb of Mombasa.
Kisumu Male Sex Workers Organisation (KIMASWO)		Western Province	Male sex workers organization based in Kisumu.
Muamko Mpya CBO	2016	Kilifi County	Based in Kilifi.
Queer Sex Workers Initiative For Refugees (QSWIK)		Kenya	Based in Nairobi, the sex worker led organisation works with LGBTQ sex workers.
Sisters of Majengo		Nairobi	Led and ran by sex workers, the organisation works with young female sex workers, ages 18–25, in the Majengo suburb of Nairobi.
Survivors Organisation	1999	Busia County	Sex worker led organisation based in Busia. Initially called Muungano.
Youth Alliance for Change Kenya		Kakamega County	Works with young male sex workers at risk of contracting HIV.

=== Malawi ===
Name	Founded	Region served	Notes
Action Hope Malawi		Zomba	Local organisation in Zomba.
Community Health Rights Advocacy (CHeRA)	2017	Malawi	Lilongwe-based NGO that works with male sex workers.
FSWA (Female Sex Workers Association)	2016	Malawi	Based in Lilongwe, the organisation has 120,000 members across the nation.
Ukhondo Services Foundation	2006	Karonga	Local organisation in Karonga.

=== Mali ===
Name	Founded	Region served	Notes
DANAYA SO	1994	Mali	Based in Bamako, the organisation has 3,800 members in six cities.
Tile Coura		Mali	Tile Coura (The New Sun) is based in Bamako and works with female sex workers, clients and families and children of sex workers.

=== Morocco ===
Name	Founded	Region served	Notes
Platform Layalat		Morocco	Trans sex worker led organisation based in Marrakech.

=== Mozambique ===
Name	Founded	Region served	Notes
Associação Tiyane Vavassate	2011	Mozambique	Sex worker led organisation based in Maputo.

=== Namibia ===
Name	Founded	Region served	Notes
Namibian Sex Workers Alliance		Namibia	Umbrella body of sex worker organizations in Namibia. Based in Walvisbay.

=== Nigeria ===
Name	Founded	Region served	Notes
APYIN (Association of Positive Youths Living with HIV/AIDS in Nigeria)		Nigeria	Based in Abuja.
CiSHRWIN		Nigeria	Based in Abuja, the organisation works with female sex workers and their clients.
Hope Empowerment For Good Health Support Initiative		Nigeria	Sex worker led organisation based in Awka.
National Association of Nigerian Prostitutes (NANP)		Nigeria	
Nigeria Sex Workers Association - Precious Jewels		Nigeria	Association of sex worker led organisations. Based in Abuja.
NNSWP (Nigerian Network of Sex Work Projects)		Nigeria	
Ohotu Diamond Women Initiative	2011	Nigeria	First sex worker led organisation in the country, based in Lagos. Originally called WOPI.

=== Rwanda ===
Name	Founded	Region served	Notes
FADA	2015	Rwanda	Sex worker led organisation based in Kigali.

=== Senegal ===
Name	Founded	Region served	Notes
Kiraay		Senegal	Based in Dakar.

=== South Africa ===
Name	Founded	Region served	Notes
Asijiki Coalition for the Decriminalisation of Sex Work ("Asijiki Coalition")	2015	South Africa	National coalition of sex worker organisations and supportive organisations.
Sex Workers Education and Advocacy Taskforce (SWEAT)	1996	South Africa	Located in Cape Town.
Sisonke	2003	South Africa	Cape Town based sex worker led organisation with offices in 6 provences based in partnership organisations.
SistaazHood	2010	Cape Town	Peer led support group for trans women sex workers.

=== South Sudan ===
Name	Founded	Region served	Notes
Byabyose	2015	South Sudan	Sex worker led organisation that works with lesbian, gay, bisexual, transgender (LGBT) sex workers and sex workers living with HIV.

=== Tanzania ===
Name	Founded	Region served	Notes
Bridge Initiative Organisation (BIO)		Zanzibar	Stone Town–based organisation that works with the Zanzibar Aids Commission (ZAC).
CHESA Community Health Education Services & Advocacy		Tanzania	Sex worker led organisation based in Ilala District, Dar es Salaam. The organisation was banned by the Government in 2017 for "promoting homosexuality".
TACEF Tanzania Community Empowerment Foundation	2013	Tanzania	Sex worker led organisation based in Dar es Salaam.
Tanzania Sex Workers Alliance (TASWA)	2015	Tanzania	Umbrella organisation for sex worker projects in Tanzania based in Dar es Salaam.
Women With Dignity (WWD)		Tanzania	Based in Dar es Salaam.

=== Togo ===
Name	Founded	Region served	Notes
Association Femme Amazone (AFAZ)		Lomé	Founded by activist Yves Kgube.

=== Uganda ===
Name	Founded	Region served	Notes
Alliance of Women Advocating for Change (AWAC)	2015	Uganda	Based in Kampala. Branches in Kampala, Mukono, Wakiso, Nakasongola, Masindi, Hoima, Gulu, Lira, Arua, Luuka, Bugiri, Tororo-Malaba, Busia, Buvuma, Kalangala, Mbale, Soroti, Buikwe, Mbarara, Kabale-Katuna, Kabarole, Kasese, Kamwenge, Ntoroko, Bundibugyo, Kyenjojo and Bunyangabo.
Lady Mermaid's Bureau	2002	Uganda	Based in Kampala. First sex worker organization in Uganda and became sex worker led in 2013.
OGERA Uganda (Organization For Gender Empowerment and Rights Advocacy)		Uganda	Based in Kampala with a main focus on LBQ and Urban Refugee female sex workers.
Rainbow Mirrors Uganda	2015	Uganda	Trans women sex worker led group based in Kampala.
Rural Movement Initiative (RUMI)	2013	Rural Mbale District	Based in Mbale.
SLUM - Serving Lives Under Marginalization		Wakiso District	Based in Wakiso.
Trans Youth Initiative-Uganda	2017	Western Region	Based in Mbarara, the organisation works mainly with rural young transgender and gender non-conforming sex workers.
Transgender Equality Uganda	2011	Uganda	Kampala based organisation that is led by, and works with transgender women sex workers.
Uganda Harm Reduction Network	2011	Uganda	Based in Kampala, work with People Who Use and Inject Drugs (PWUIDs).
Uganda Network for Sex Work -Led Organisations (UNESO)		Uganda	Umbrella network of sex worker led organizations in Uganda.
Women's organisation network for human rights advocacy (WONETHA)	2008	Uganda	Sex worker–led organisation based in Kampala. They are an Aidfonds partner.
Women Arise For Change		Uganda	Female sex worker–led organization based in Kampala that works with refugee, bisexual and lesbian sex workers.
Invisible Dots Uganda (IDU)	2021	Uganda	Based in Hoima with a main focus on Key Affected Population (KAP). IDU's mission is to end human rights abuses against the girl child, women with disabilities and female sex workers in their diversities within Uganda. IDU is committed to address stigma and discrimination linked to gender, sex work and physical disabilities though advocacy and promotion of human rights for equitable access to health services and social security.

=== Zambia ===
Name	Founded	Region served	Notes
Educating Girls and Young women for Development		Zambia	Based in Lusaka.
Engender Rights Centre for Justice (ERCJ)		Lusaka and surrounds	Based in Lusaka.
Focus on Marginalized Women in our Society Charity		North-Western Province	Based in Solwezi.
Ombre		Zambia	Sex worker led group based in Lusaka.
VIVONS	2015	Kitwe	Led by, and for, LGBT sex workers.
Zambia Sex Workers Alliance	2018	Zambia	National chapter of the African Sex Workers Alliance. Based in Lusaka.

=== Zimbabwe ===
Name	Founded	Region served	Notes
Pow Wow		Zimbabwe	Sex worker led collective based in Bulawayo that is an Aidsfond partner.
Space for marginalised Groups in Diversity in Zimbabwe Trust	2016	Zimbabwe	Based in Masvingo, the organisation works with transgender sex workers.
Zimbabwe Rainbow Community	2018	Zimbabwe	Sex worker led organization that works with male sex workers and their families, partners, friends and clients.
ZIMSWA	2017	Zimbabwe	Based in Bulawayo, the organisation works in all 10 provinces of Zimbabwe.

== Asia ==
=== Bangladesh ===
Name	Founded	Region served	Notes
HARC - HIV/AIDS Research and Welfare Centre		Bangladesh	Sex worker led group based in Dhaka with 5,000 member throughout Bangladesh.
SWN – Sex Workers Network		Bangladesh	Sex worker led national network.

=== Cambodia ===
Name	Founded	Region served	Notes
Women's Network for Unity	2002	Cambodia	Based in Phnom Penh.

=== China ===
Name	Founded	Region served	Notes
SCMC:Shanghai CSW & MSM Center	2004	Shanghai	The organisation provides support, advice and health testing to sex workers.
Yunnan Parallel (机构名称：云南平行)		Yunnan Province	Based in Kunming.

=== East Timor ===
Name	Founded	Region served	Notes
$carlet Timor Collective	2009	East Timor	National sex worker collective based in Dili.

=== Hong Kong ===
Name	Founded	Region served	Notes
Midnight Blue	2005	Hong Kong	The organisation works with male and transgender sex workers.
Zi Teng	1996	Hong Kong	The organisation engages in outreach work and provides of legal, occupational safety and health information to sex workers.

=== India ===
Name	Founded	Region served	Notes
AINSW - All India Network of Sex Workers		India	Network of sex workers organisations based in New Delhi, with office holders in 13 states.
Ashodaya Samithi	2004	Karnataka	Active in six districts of Karnataka.
ASTITVA Trust		Udaipur district, Rajasthan	Led by transgender sex workers and LGBT activists.
Durbar Mahila Samanwaya Committee (DMSC)	1992	West Bengal	Collective of 65,000 sex workers. The cultural wing, Komal Gandhar, produces plays based on the experiences of sex workers.
GAURAV (Greater Action for Unity Rights Advocacy & Visibility)	2010	Maharashtra	Works with male sex workers in Mumbai, Aurangabad and Nagpur.
NNSW (National Network of Sex Workers)	1997	India	Network of sex worker organisations and supporting NGOs based in Chennai with 50,000 members.
SANGRAM (Sampada Grameen Mahila Sanstha)	1992	Maharashtra and Karnataka	Based in Sangli district.
VAMP (VESHYA ANYAY MUKTI PARISHAD)	1996	Maharashtra and Karnataka	Based in Sangli district.

=== Indonesia ===
Name	Founded	Region served	Notes
OPSI (Organisasi Perubahan Sosial Indonesia)		Indonesia	National network of sex workers based in Rawamangun, East Jakarta.

=== Japan ===
Name	Founded	Region served	Notes
Sex Worker and Sexual Health (SWASH)	1999	Japan	Based in Osaka, SWASH opposes slavery and exploitation, researches the sex work industry and seeks to empower sex workers.

=== Kazakhstan ===
Name	Founded	Region served	Notes
Public Association "Amelia"		Kazakhstan	Sex worker led organization based in Taldykorgan.
Taldikorgan Fund (ОФ «Талдыкорганский региональный фонд содействия занятости», социальное бюро «КОВЧЕГ»)		Kazakhstan	

=== Kyrgyzstan ===
Name	Founded	Region served	Notes
Таис Плюс / Tais Plus	1997	Chuy Region	Based in Bishkek.

=== Malaysia ===
Name	Founded	Region served	Notes
PT Foundation Sex Worker Programme	1992	Klang Valley	Based in Kuala Lumpur, the organisation provides support to those impacted by HIV and AIDS in the Klang Valley conurbation. The programme is part of the PT Foundation.

=== Mongolia ===
Name	Founded	Region served	Notes
Perfect Ladies		Mongolia	NGO that promotes health care for sex workers.

=== Myanmar ===
Name	Founded	Region served	Notes
Aye Myanmar Association (AMA)	2009	Myanmar	Established as Aids Myanmar Association National Network of Sex Work Projects in 2009 as a "Targeted Outreach Program" (TOP) run by Population Services International (PSI). The organisation became independent in 2012 and renamed as Aye Myanmar Association. Based in Yangon.
SWIM (Sex Workers in Myanmar)		Myanmar	The organisation is in partnerships with Myanmar positive Women Network, Myanmar Positive Group, MSM network, IDU network, National NGO Network, Myanmar CSO partners, UNFPA, UNDP and UNAIDS

=== Nepal ===
Name	Founded	Region served	Notes
Jagriti Mahila Maha Sangh (JMMS)	2006	Nepal	Based in Kathmandu, the network has 26 regional sex worker led organisations members.
Society For Women Awareness Nepal (SWAN)	2006	Nepal	First NGO created by sex workers in Nepal.
Young Professional Development Society Nepal (YPDSN)	2013	Nepal	Based in Kathmandu.

=== Pakistan ===
Name	Founded	Region served	Notes
Amitiel Welfare Society	2008	Bahawalpur	NGO that promotes HIV awareness.
RAAH Foundation	2016	Punjab	Based in Gujrat, the organisation works towards HIV awareness.

=== Philippines ===
Name	Founded	Region served	Notes
Philippin Sex Workers Collective		Philippines	Network of sex worker led organisations based in Baguio.

=== Singapore ===
Name	Founded	Region served	Notes
Project X	2008	Singapore	The organisation works with sex workers and occasionally with clients, brothel keepers, and agents.

=== South Korea ===
Name	Founded	Region served	Notes
Hanteo National Union	2004	South Korea	Represents 15,000 sex workers and some brothel owners.
Giant Girls	2009	South Korea	Works against the criminalisation of sex work.

=== Taiwan ===
Name	Founded	Region served	Notes
Collective of Sex Workers and Supporters	1998	Taiwan	Based in Taipei.

=== Thailand ===
Name	Founded	Region served	Notes
EMPOWER	1984	Thailand	The organization maintains centres in Patpong (Bangkok), Chiang Mai, Mae Sai and Patong, Phuket.
SWING (Service Workers in Group)	1985	Bangkok, Ko Samui and Pattaya	Based in Bangkok, the organisation runs drop-in centres in the red-light districts of Patpong (Bangkok), Ko Samui and Walking Street (Pattaya).

=== Turkey ===
Name	Founded	Region served	Notes
Pembe Hayat (Pink Life LGBTT Solidarity Association)	2009	Turkey	Based in Ankara, the organisation works with trans sex workers.
Red Umbrella Sexual Health and Human Rights Association		Turkey	Based in Ankara.

=== Vietnam ===
Name	Founded	Region served	Notes
Vietnam Network of Sex Workers	2012	Vietnam	Sex worker led network with 32 community-based organisations in 21 provinces.

== Europe ==
=== Armenia ===
Name	Founded	Region served	Notes
New Generation Humanitarian NGO		Armenia	Based in Yerevan, the organisation works with male, female, and trans commercial sex workers and their clients.
Right Side Human Rights Defender NGO	2016	Armenia	Trans-led organisation based in Yerevan.

=== Austria ===
Name	Founded	Region served	Notes
Berufsvertretung Sexarbeit Österreich (BSÖ)		Austria	Sex worker–led and based in Vienna.
iBUS (Innsbrucker Beratung und Unterstützung für Sexarbeiter*innen)		Innsbruck	Sex worker support and advice organisation.
LEFO	1985	Austria	Based in Vienna, the organisation works with migrant sex workers.
Maiz		Linz	The organisation works with migrant sex workers.
Projekt PiA		Salzburg State	The organisation works with male and female sex workers
RED EDITION - Migrant sex workers collective		Austria	Organisation that works with migrant sex workers. Based in Vienna.
SXA-Info/Verein Frauenservice		Graz	Provides information and counselling services.

=== Belgium ===
Name	Founded	Region served	Notes
Alias		Brussels	For male and trans sex workers.
Boysproject		Antwerp	For male and trans sex workers.
Espace P		(Wallonia) French Community	Brussels and Wallonia.
Icar		Wallonia	Wallonia.
UTSOPI		Belgium	National collective of sex workers.
Violett	2019	Flemish Community (Flanders + Brussels)	Based in Antwerp. Created in 2019 as an umbrella for Ghapro and Pasop, which remain separate organisations: Ghapro vzw (Antwerp Province, part of Flemish Brabant). Founded in 2002, based in Antwerp.; Pasop vzw (rest of Flanders, and Brussels). Founded in 1990, based in Ghent.

=== Bosnia and Herzegovina ===
Name	Founded	Region served	Notes
Action Against AIDS		Bosnia and Herzegovina	Based in Banja Luka.

=== Czech Republic ===
Name	Founded	Region served	Notes
Czech Sisters of Perpetual Indulgence		Czech Republic	Based in Prague.
ROZKOS bez RIZIKA	1992	Czech Republic	Based in Prague.

=== Denmark ===
Name	Founded	Region served	Notes
Sexarbejdernes Interesseorganisation	2008	Denmark	Sex worker led organisation.

=== Finland ===
Name	Founded	Region served	Notes
FTS Finland		Finland	Network of female, male, and transgender sex workers.
Salli - United Sex Professionals of Finland	2002	Finland	The organisation works for the human rights of sex workers.

=== France ===
Name	Founded	Region served	Notes
Autres Regards	1995	Marseille; Avignon	Based in Marseille, previously had a branch in Toulon.
Cabiria		Lyon	Sex worker community health organisation.
Collectif des Femmes de Strasbourg-Saint-Denis	2013	Paris	Collective of sex workers in the Strasbourg-Saint-Denis district of Paris.
Collectif Droits & Prostitution		France	National collective of sex workers' organisations and organisations working with sex workers.
Federation Parapluie Rouge		France	Federation of community health and sex worker associations.
Griselidis	2000	Toulouse	Named after Griselidis Real.
IPPO	2001	Bordeaux	Support organisation for sex workers.
Itinéraires Entr'Actes		Lille	Support organisation for sex workers.
Les amis du bus des femmes	1990	Paris	The organisation operates 8 busses to support sex workers.
PASTT (Prevention Action Sante Travail pour Transgenres)	1994	Paris	The organisation works with transgender sex workers.
Putains dans l'âme		Besançon	Organisation of sex workers and supporters.
Syndicat du travail sexuel (STRASS)	2009	France	Trade union for male, female, and transgender sex workers. Based in Paris.

=== Georgia ===
Name	Founded	Region served	Notes
Women for Freedom	2014	Georgia	Based in Tbilisi.

=== Germany ===
Name	Founded	Region served	Notes
Berufsverband erotische und sexuelle Dienstleistungen (BesD)	2013	Cologne	Trade association for erotic and sexual service providers.
bufas		Berlin	Alliance of specialist advice centers for sex workers.
Bundesverband Sexuelle Dienstleistungen (BSD)	2002	Berlin	For operators of brothel-like businesses and self-employed prostitutes. Acts as a consultant for the Federal Ministry of Labour and Social Affairs.
Doña Carmen	1998	Frankfurt	Self-help organization based in the Bahnhofsviertel district of Frankfurt.
Huren wehren sich gemeinsam	1984	Frankfurt	Self-help group that ran from 1984 to 1999.
Hydra e. V.	1979	Berlin	First West German organisation of the Sex Workers' Rights Movement.
Kassandra e. V.	1987	Nuremberg	Sex worker support services.
Madonna e. V.	1991	Bochum	Self-help organisation.
Voice4Sexworkers	2014	Germany	Network of organisations and individuals.

=== Greece ===
Name	Founded	Region served	Notes
Red Umbrella Athens	2015	Athens	Aims to promote health and ensure the rights of sex workers.
Sex Workers' Empowerment Network	2021	Athens	Aims to empower sex workers by unionising them, and thus by forming a sex worker led community.

=== Hungary ===
Name	Founded	Region served	Notes
Association of Hungarian Sex Workers SZEXE	2000	Hungary	Based in Budapest.
Sex Workers' Rights Advocacy Network (SWAN)		Hungary	Network unites NGOs and sex worker groups.

=== Ireland ===
Name	Founded	Region served	Notes
Sex Workers Alliance Ireland (SWAI)	2009	Ireland	Sex worker–led organisation based in Dublin. It supports the human rights of sex workers and the decriminalisation of sex work in Ireland.
Red Umbrella Front (RUF)	2021	Ireland	"Grass-roots sex worker organisation founded by sex workers in Ireland in response to state violence and exploitation by non-governmental organisations, including those founded and run by religious orders."

=== Italy ===
Name	Founded	Region served	Notes
Comitato Diritti Civili delle Prostitute Onlus (CDCP)	1983	Italy	Sex worker–led organisation based in Trieste.
Le Graziose, CDCP Genova	2007	Genoa	Genoese branch of the CDCP.
Ombre Rosse		Italy	Sex worker collective.

=== Lithuania ===
Name and abbreviation	Founded	Region served	Notes
Demetra Association of HIV affected Women and Their Family	2000	Lithuania	The association works with female sex workers, their clients, and HIV-affected women.

=== Luxembourg ===
Name and abbreviation	Founded	Region served	Notes
dropIn Croix-Rouge		Luxembourg	Sex worker support services run by the Red Cross.

=== Montenegro ===
Name and abbreviation	Founded	Region served	Notes
Juventas		Montenegro	Based in Podgorica.

=== Netherlands ===
Name and abbreviation	Founded	Region served	Notes
Aidsfonds / Soa AIDS Nederland	1985	Netherlands	Merged with Stichting soa-bestrijding in 2004. The Sex Work Projects Programme aims to prevent HIV/AIDS and STIs amongst sex workers. Based in Amsterdam.
PROUD (labour union)	2015	Netherlands	National sex trade union for (former) sex workers. Based in Amsterdam. Successor of The Red Thread (De Rode Draad).
Red Light United	2019	(Amsterdam) De Wallen	Trade union of (mostly foreign) window workers on De Wallen. Based in Amsterdam.
TAMPEP	1993	Europe	Calls itself the "European Network for HIV/STI Prevention and Health Promotion among Migrant Sex Workers". Based in Amsterdam. Hosted from Helsinki.
Door2Door	1989	Rotterdam	Door2Door is an information and service center created by and for sex workers, based in Rotterdam and the area.

=== North Macedonia ===
Name and abbreviation	Founded	Region served	Notes
HOPS (Healthy Options Project Skopje)		Skopje	Provides health, social, and legal services to sex workers.
STAR-STAR	2010	North Macedonia	Based in Skopje.

=== Norway ===
Name and abbreviation	Founded	Region served	Notes
PION - Sex Workers interest organisation in Norway		Norway	Based in Oslo.

=== Poland ===
Name and abbreviation	Founded	Region served	Notes
Sex Work Polska	2015	Poland	Based in Warsaw.

=== Portugal ===
Name and abbreviation	Founded	Region served	Notes
APDES (Agencia Piaget para o Desenvolvimento)		Portugal	Based in Vila Nova de Gaia.
Movimento dxs Trabalhadorxs do Sexo		Portugal	National organisation that supports sex worker's rights.
Rede sobre Trabalho Sexual (RTS)	2011	Portugal	Network of sex work organisations.

=== Romania ===
Name and abbreviation	Founded	Region served	Notes
SexWorkCall Romania	2018	Romania	Founded by three sexworkers and based in Bucharest.

=== Russia ===
Name and abbreviation	Founded	Region served	Notes
Silver Rose	2003	Russian Federation	Sex worker–led organisation based in St Petersburg, with branches in more than 40 Russian cities.
Sex Workers Forum Russia	2016	Russian Federation	Based in Kazan.

=== Serbia ===
Name and abbreviation	Founded	Region served	Notes
JAZAS - Association Against AIDS		Serbia	Advocate for universal access to health services.
Sloboda Prava (Equal Rights)	2011	Serbia	Sex workers' rights organization based in Belgrade.

=== Spain ===
Name and abbreviation	Founded	Region served	Notes
APROSEX		Barcelona	The organisation works with cis and trans female sex workers.
CATS (Comite de Apoyo a las Trabajadoras del Sexo)	2002	Murcia Alicante Albacete Almería	Sex worker support organisation.
Centro Alba		Zaragoza	Support organisation for sex workers and their families.
Colectivo Caye		Asturias	Sex worker–led organisation.
Prostitutas Indignadas	2012	Barcelona	Sex worker–led organisation of street workers in the El Raval neighbourhood.
Sindicato OTRAS		Spain	Delegations in the Canary Islands, Madrid, Murcia, Seville, and Valencia.
Plataforma StopAbolicion	2022	Spain	Coalition of people affected by sex work criminalization laws.

=== Sweden ===
Name and abbreviation	Founded	Region served	Notes
Fuckförbundet	2017	Sweden	Organisation led by sex workers and based in Gothenburg.
Rose Alliance	2010	Sweden	Sex worker–led organisation based in Stockholm.
Sexsäljares och allierades nätverk i Sverige	2007	Sweden	Network of sex workers and their allies.

=== Switzerland ===
Name and abbreviation	Founded	Region served	Notes
Aspasie	1982	Geneva	Co-founded by Grisélidis Réal.
Fleur de Pavé	1996	Lausanne	Health organisation for sex workers.
ProCoRe (Prostitution Collective Reflexion)	1990s	Switzerland	Network of 27 sex worker organisations.
Syndicat des travailleuses et travailleurs du sexe	2012	Switzerland	Based in Geneva.
XENIA	1984	Bern	Sex worker support organisation based in the city of Bern.

=== Ukraine ===
Name and abbreviation	Founded	Region served	Notes
All-Ukrainian League "Legalife"		Ukraine	National sex workers organisation.
CO Legalife-Ukraine		Ukraine	National organisation for sex workers and their clients.
Public Movement "Faith, Hope, Love" (Общественное Движение "Вера, Надежда, Любовь")	1996	Ukraine	Based in Odessa.

=== United Kingdom ===
Name and abbreviation	Founded	Region served	Notes
Cybertease	2020	All global and intergalactic locations	Workers cooperative set up by members of the USW union.
English Collective of Prostitutes (ECP)	1975	England	Based in London.
International Union of Sex Workers (IUSW)	2000	United Kingdom	United Kingdom–based trade union for sex workers.
Manchester Action on Street Health (MASH)	1991	Manchester	
National Ugly Mugs (NUM)	2012	United Kingdom	Takes reports of incidents from sex workers, and produces anonymised warnings which are sent directly to sex workers and front-line support projects throughout the UK.
SCOT-PEP (Scottish Prostitutes Education Project)		Scotland	Based in Edinburgh.
Sex Worker Advocacy and Resistance Movement (SWARM)	2009	United Kingdom	Originally named Sex Worker Open University.
Support For Student Sex Workers		Manchester	
The Sex Workers Union	2018	United Kingdom	Originally named United Sex Workers.
UK Network of Sex Work Projects (UKNSWP)		United Kingdom	Umbrella organisation that represents sex work projects in the UK.
Umbrella Lane	2015	Scotland	Support organisation based in Glasgow.
x:talk	2006	London	Provides free English classes for migrant workers in the sex industry.

== North America ==
=== Belize ===
Name and abbreviation	Founded	Region served	Notes
Tikkun Olam Belize	2011	Belize	Based in Orange Walk Town.

=== Canada ===
Name and abbreviation	Founded	Region served	Notes
BC Coalition of Experiential Communities	2005	British Columbia	Sex worker–led organisation based in Vancouver. Originally B. C. Coalition of Experiential Women, but later expanded to include male and trans sex workers.
Butterfly - Asian and Migrant Sex Workers Network	2014	Canada	Support network for Asian and migrant sex workers. Based in Ontario.
Canadian Guild for Erotic Labour	2003	Ontario; Quebec	Peer-led group for those in the adult industry, including escorts, erotic masseuses, body rub, street workers, erotic dancer, BDSM professionals, and porn performers/models.
CASWLR (Canadian Alliance for Sex Work Law Reform)	2014?	Canada	Based in Montreal, connecting with sex workers and similar organisations nationally to challenge and inform governments to impact laws and policies regarding sex work.
FIRST		Canada	Based in Vancouver.
Maggie's: The Toronto Sex Workers Action Project	1986	Toronto	One of the first sex worker–led organisations in Canada.
Migrant Sex Workers Project		Toronto	Migrant sex worker–led group.
Operation Snatch		Toronto	Multidisciplinary theatre company run by sex workers; theatre is used as a platform for social activism.
PACE (Providing Alternatives Counselling & Education Society)	1994	Vancouver	Sex worker–led organisation.
Peers Victoria Resources Society	1995	Victoria, British Columbia	Sex worker–led organisation.
POWER (Prostitutes of Ottawa, Gatineau, Work, Educate, Resist)		Ottawa	Sex worker–led organisation.
Projet L.U.N.E.	2012	Quebec	Sex worker–led organisation.
Shift Calgary		Calgary	Provides support to current and former sex workers.
S.H.O.P. (Safe Harbour Outreach Project)		Newfoundland	Based in St. John's.
SPOC (Sex Professionals of Canada)	1983	Canada	National, voluntary, sex worker–run organization that is funded entirely by donations, seeking to decriminalise all forms of sex work in Canada through advocacy and education.
Stella, l'amie de Maimie	1995	Montreal	Offers support and information to sex workers.
Stepping Stone	1988	Halifax, Nova Scotia	Provides support to sex workers.
SWAG (Sex Workers Action Group)		Kingston, Ontario	Sex worker–led organisation.
SWAN (Sex Workers' Action Network of Waterloo Region)		Waterloo Region	Based in Kitchener, Ontario.
SWAN (Supporting Women's Alternative's Network Vancouver)	2002	(British Columbia) Lower Mainland	Based in Vancouver.
SWAP Hamilton (Sex Workers' Action Program of Hamilton)		Hamilton	Provide support services to sex workers.

=== El Salvador ===
Name and abbreviation	Founded	Region served	Notes
Asociacion de Mujeres Trabajadoras Sexuales LIQUIDAMBAR	2009	El Salvador	Based in San Salvador.
Fundacion Angelica Quinta		El Salvador	Based in San Salvador.
La Organización de Trabajadoras del Sexo de El Salvador	2009	El Salvador	Based in San Salvador.

=== Haiti ===
Name and abbreviation	Founded	Region served	Notes
Association Nationale de Protection des Femmes et Enfants Haïtiens (ANAPFEH)	1991	Haiti	Organisation that works with sex workers and their children, based in Delmas.

=== Jamaica ===
Name and abbreviation	Founded	Region served	Notes
Jamaica SW Coalition		Jamaica	Sex worker–led organisation based in Kingston.

=== Mexico ===
Name and abbreviation	Founded	Region served	Notes
Aproase		Mexico	Sex worker–led organisation based in México City.
Casa de Las Muñecas Tiresias	2018	Mexico	Provides support in health and food services for transgender people and sex workers.
Casa Xochiquetzal	2006	Mexico City	Support for elderly sex workers.
Centro De Apoyo A Las Identidades Trans A.C.	2011	Mexico City	Trans sex worker–led organisation.
Colectivo de Hombres en Accion Comunitaria A.C.		Mexico	Organisation for male and transgender sex workers based in Monterrey.
Colectivo Seres A.C.		Guanajuato	Based in Guanajuato City.
Diversidad TTT A.C.	2009	Mexico	Based in San Cristóbal de las Casas.
JOVENES DIVERSOS VIHDA A.C.		Tamaulipas	Promotes HIV awareness.
Movimiento de Trabajo Sexual de México		Mexico	National sex worker–led organisation based in Mexico City.
Mujer Libertad A.C	1997	Queretaro	Sex worker–led organisation.
Tamaulipas Diversidad Vihda Trans A.C.	2009	Tamaulipas	The organisation supports HIV prevention. Based in Tampico.
Union y Fuerza de Mujeres Trans Chihuahuenses a.c.		Chihuahua	Support for transgender sex workers.

=== Nicaragua ===
Name and abbreviation	Founded	Region served	Notes
Asociación de Mujeres "Las Golondrinas"	2004	Nicaragua	Sex worker led organisation based in Matagalpa.

=== Panama ===
Name and abbreviation	Founded	Region served	Notes
Red Perts Panama		Panama	Based in Santiago.

=== Trinidad and Tobago ===
Name and abbreviation	Founded	Region served	Notes
RED Initiatives		Trinidad and Tobago	Based in Arima.
Terkita Persad		Trinidad and Tobago	Based in Tunapuna.

=== United States ===
Name and abbreviation	Founded	Region served	Notes
APAC (Adult Performer Advocacy Committee)	2014	United States	Support organisation for performers in the adult film industry.
BAYSWAN	1999	(San Francisco) Bay Area	Non-profit organization for sex workers in the San Francisco Bay Area.
Best Practices Policy Project		United States	Supports sex workers and organizations, and advocates working with sex workers.
BSWC (The Black Sex Worker Collective)		New York City	Black sex worker collective.
COYOTE	1973	United States	Founded in 1973 in San Francisco, advocacy group for sex workers.
Cupcake Girls	2010	United States	Provides support to sex workers in 22 states, with offices in Las Vegas and Portland, Oregon.
CUSP (Community United for Safety & Protection)		Alaska	Sex worker–led organisation based in Nenana.
Decriminalize Sex Work (DSW)	2018	United States	National organization pursuing a state-by-state strategy to end the prohibition of consensual adult prostitution. Decriminalize Sex Work works with local organizations, advocates, and lobbyists to build community support and convince legislators to stop prostitution-related arrests.
Desiree Alliance	2005	United States	National alliance of sex workers and former sex workers based in Arkansas.
Don't Strip Our Rights	2020	United States	Sex worker–led and run organization based in Denver and Washington, D.C., advocating for decriminalization and labor protections for all sex workers through worker-led lobbying, research, and community outreach.
ESPLER Project (Sex Workers and Erotic Service Providers Legal Education and Research Project)	2010	United States	Peer-led organisation based in San Francisco that supports sex workers and others in the adult industry, such as exotic dancers, phone sex operators, adult film performers, web cam performers, and dominatrix-submissives.
ESPU (Erotic Service Providers Union)	2004	United States	Peer-led organisation based in San Francisco.
GLITS		United States	Transgender sex worker organisation based in Queens.
HIPS		Washington, D.C.	Provides support services to sex workers in the D.C. Metro area.
International Sex Worker Foundation for Art, Culture and Education		United States	Based in California, runs museum in Montana.
Las Vegas Dancers Alliance	2002–03	Nevada	
NJRUA (NJ Red Umbrella Alliance)		New Jersey	NGO that works for sex worker rights.
PONY (Prostitutes of New York)	1994	New York	Sex worker led organisation.
Red Canary Song	2018	New York City	Massage worker group based in Flushing.
Red Light District by TW!O	2022	Atlanta	Sex workers rights advocacy organization providing community, safety, and support to sex workers - based in Atlanta.
Red Umbrella Project	2010	New York City	Sex worker–led group based in Brooklyn.
St. James Infirmary Clinic	1999	San Francisco	Peer based health services to sex workers.
STROLL (Sex Traders Radical Outreach & Liberation Lobby)	2016	Portland, Oregon	Sex worker led organisation.
SWOP-USA (Sex Workers Outreach Project USA)	2003	United States	Branches: Behind Bars, Chicago, Denver, New Orleans, New York, Northern California, Philadelphia, Pittsburgh, Sacramento, San Antonio, San Francisco, Seattle, Tucson.
The Outlaw Project		United States	Advocates for the rights of sex workers who are people of colour, transgender women, gender non-binary, or migrants.
The Sex Workers Project at the Urban Justice Centre		New York City	Provide legal and social services to sex workers.
Women with a Vision		New Orleans	Collective of African-American sex workers.
VENUS (Valued Existence of Northeastern and Ubiquitous Sexworkers)	2022	Portland, Maine	Sex worker–led advocacy group serving the Northeast and primarily based out of Maine
Yukon Status of Women Council		Yukon	Based in Whitehorse.

Supportive

Name and abbreviation	Support since	Region served	Notes
American Civil Liberties Union (ACLU)	1975	United States	New York–based civil rights organization that has supported decriminalizing sex work since 1975 (unofficially since 1973).

== Oceania ==
=== Australia ===
Name	Founded	Region served	Notes
Scarlet Alliance	1989	Australia	National peak body for sex workers and sex worker organisations. Sex worker–only organisation based in Newtown.
SIN (Sex Industry Network)	1986	South Australia	Sex worker–only organisation, originally called Prostitutes Association of South Australia (PASA). Based in Mile End.
SWOP NSW (Sex Workers Outreach Project New South Wales)	1983	New South Wales	Sex worker–only organisation, originally called the Australia Prostitutes' Collective. Based in Alexandria.
SWEAR WA (Sex Work: Education, Advocacy, & Rights Western Australia)	2013	Western Australia	Sex worker–only organisation, originally called People for Sex Worker Rights WA.
Vixen	2005	Victoria	Sex worker–only organisation based in Brunswick.
Respect Inc	2009	Queensland	Sex worker–only organisation. Drop-in centres in Brisbane, Cairns, and the Gold Coast.
SWOP ACT (Sex Workers Outreach Project Australian Capital Territory)		Australian Capital Territory	Sex worker–only organisation based in Turner.
SWOP NT (Sex Workers Outreach Project Northern Territory)		Northern Territory	Sex worker–only organisation based in Darwin.
Magenta		Western Australia	Sex worker–led organisation based in Perth.
RhED (Resourcing health and Education)		Victoria	Sex worker–led organisation based in St Kilda.
Salome's Circle		Victoria	Support organisation for strippers/exotic dancers. Based in Melbourne.
Touching Base	2000	Australia	Organisation connecting sex workers and people with disability. Based in Sydney.

=== Fiji ===
Name	Founded	Region served	Notes
Pacific Rainbow$ Advocacy Network	2008	Fiji	Organisation that supports female, transgender, and male sex werkers. Based in Lautoka.
Strumphet Alliance Network	2014	Fiji	Sex worker–led organisation based in Suva.

=== New Zealand ===
Name	Founded	Region served	Notes
New Zealand Prostitutes' Collective	1987	New Zealand	Sex worker–led collective based in Wellington, with branches in other cities.

=== Papua New Guinea ===
Name	Founded	Region served	Notes
Friends Frangipani	2006	Papua New Guinea	Sex worker–led group based in Port Moresby.

== South America ==
=== Argentina ===
Name	Founded	Region served	Notes
Association of Women Sex Workers of Argentina (AMMAR)	2000	Córdoba	Sex worker–led organisation.

=== Brazil ===
Name	Founded	Region served	Notes
APROSMIG (Associação das Prostitutas de Minas Gerais)		Brazil	Sex worker–led organisation based in Belo Horizonte.
Associação Mulheres Guerreiras	2007	Brazil	Sex worker–led organisation based in Campinas.
Associação Pernambucana das Profissionais do Sexo (Pernambuco Association of Sex Workers)		Brazil	Based in Recife.
ASTRASSE (Associação das Trabalhadoras Sexuais de Sergipe)		Brazil	Based in Aracaju.
Davida	1992	Brazil	Based in Rio de Janeiro.
Estrela Guia		Brazil	Based in Florianópolis.
GEMPAC (Grupo de Mulheres Prostitutas do Estado do Para)		Brazil	Based in Belém.

=== Colombia ===
Name and abbreviation	Founded	Region served	Notes
Lxs callejerxs		Colombia	Sex worker–led organisation based in Bogotá.
Fundacion Red Comunitaria Trans	2012	Bogotá	Tran sex worker organisation in the Santa Fe tolerance zone of Bogotá.
TWIGGY Fundación	2016	Valle del Cauca	Tran sex worker organisation based in Cali. Named after the founder, María del Pilar "Twiggy" Escobar.

=== Ecuador ===
Name and abbreviation	Founded	Region served	Notes
Asociacion de Mujeres Autonomas "22nd de Junio"	1985	El Oro	First sex workers organisation in Latin America.
Asociacion de mujeres del canton milagro		Guayas	Association that works with sex workers who work on the streets.
Asociacion De Mujeres Trabajadoras Del Sexo "Colectivo Flor De Azalea"		Guayas	Sex worker–led association that works with sex workers who work on the streets.
Asociación de Trabajadoras Autonomas 1 de Agosto		Guayas	Association that works with sex workers and their clients and families.
Asociación de Trabajadoras Sexuales 1o de Mayo		Quito	Association that works with sex workers who work on the streets.
Asociacion De Trabajadoras Sexuales Por Un Futuro Mejor		Quito	Works with cis and transgender sex workers.
Asociación de Trabajadoras Sexuales Trans de Quito		Quito	Led by, and for, trans sex workers.
Asociacion Goover	2004	Quito	Sex worker–led group for male sex workers.
Asociacion Horizontes Diversos		Manabí	Works with female, trans, and male sex workers
Asociacion Primero de Mayo		Quito	Advocate for universal access to health services.
Asociacion Pro Defensa de la Mujer - ASPRODEMU		Pichincha	The association works with sex workers who work in indoor venues. Based in Quito.
Association of Autonomous Female Workers (AAFW)	1982	Ecuador	Operated by health care workers and sex workers.
Coalición de Trabajadorxs Sexuales de Quito (CTSQ)		Quito	Activist platform for sex workers.
Federacion Nacional de Mujeres Autonomas del Ecuador		Quevedo	Work with female and trans sex workers.
Fundacion Transgeneros Peninsulares	2002	Salinas	Trans sex worker–led organisation.
PLAPERTS (Plataforma Latinoamerica de Personas que Ejercen el Trabajo Sexual)		Machala	Works with female, trans, and male sex workers.
Red de Trabajadoras Sexuales del Ecuador (REDTRABSEX)	2005	Ecuador	Umbrella network of sex worker organisations in Ecuador.

=== Guyana ===
Name and abbreviation	Founded	Region served	Notes
Guyana Sex Work Coalition (GSWC)	2008	Guyana	Based in Georgetown, one of the first sex worker led organisations in the Caribbean.

=== Peru ===
Name and abbreviation	Founded	Region served	Notes
Asociación Civil Angel Azul	2002	Lima	Association of trans women from South Lima.
Asociacion Civil Cambio Y Accion	2006	Lima	Aims to create safe areas for sex work.
Asociacion TS Tumbes Por Nosotras para Nosotras		Peru	Based in Tumbes.
Miluska Vida y Dignidad A.C.		Peru	Sex worker led organisation based in Lima.
MTSP (Movimiento de Trabajadoras Sexuales del Peru)		Peru	Union of sex workers in Peru.
Mujeres del Sur		Arequipa	Sex worker led organisation.

=== Suriname ===
Name and abbreviation	Founded	Region served	Notes
Stichting Rachab	1994	Suriname	Advocates for the rights and health of all sex workers in Suriname. Originally named Stichting Maxi Linder Association (SMLA) after famous sex worker Maxi Linder.
Suriname Collection of Sex Workers (DCF–SUCOS)	2018	Suriname	Paramaribo-based foundation registered as DCF by Denise Carr in 2018. Originated from the 2015 unregistered SUCOS.
Suriname Men United (SMU)	2005	Suriname	Paramaribo-based NGO dedicated to improving the well-being of men who have sex with men in Suriname. Has supported decriminisalisation of sex work.

== See also ==
- Decriminalization of sex work
- Prostitution by region
- Sex workers' rights § Movement
