= Prostitution in Finland =

Prostitution in Finland (the exchange of sexual acts for money) is legal, but soliciting in a public place and organised prostitution (operating a brothel or a prostitution ring, and other forms of pimping) are illegal. According to a 2010 TAMPEP study, 69% of prostitutes working in Finland are migrants. As of 2009, there was little "visible" prostitution in Finland as it was mostly limited to private residences and nightclubs in larger metropolitan areas.

== History ==
The socio-legal history of prostitution in Finland is similar to that of other European and Western countries, with various periods of tolerance, regulation and abolition.

=== 18th century – early 20th century ===
The passing of the Civil Code of 1734 was the first nation-wide law for all of Sweden, as well as Finland, that prohibited prostitution. The historical position of sexual morality was based on the Christian standard of condemning both premarital and extramarital sexual relations. These religious values were reflected in the common law across Europe and most Western societies throughout this period. In 1847, the Regulation system was introduced in Finland and became the target of a campaign from the Finska Federationen until it was abolished in 1907.

The next major development came in the form of the 1889 Penal Code of Finland, which prohibited both pandering and prostitution. The code extended the prohibition to cover "any professional fornication", meaning the law would not tolerate prostitution no matter where it was taking place. International activism concerning prostitution at the end of the 19th century transformed the societal view of prostitution as an aspect of urban life to one which perceived the labour as a social problem. This evolution demanded the removal of prostitutes from the public eye through criminalisation of the female prostitutes as delinquents.

From 1937 to 1986 the Vagrancy Act was also in effect in Finland. In accordance with the legislation prostitutes could be taken under control and given orders by the police and social and health care authorities. This could include interrogations, sending to institutions, arrests, obligations to undergo health examinations and various other regulatory requests.

Activism after World War II and the gradual 20th century abandoning of the standard of absolute sexual morality again shifted social perceptions of prostitution. The economic depression, alongside other structural and political reasons, contributed to an increase in the sex trade after the Second World War. The universal human rights movement of the time pushed for the decriminalisation of prostitution so as not to punish women who were victims of poverty or exploitation.

=== Late 20th century – present ===
The geopolitical position of Finland, and its position in the European Union as of 1995, had a significant influence on the sex trade in the 1990s. Access to sex services became increasingly easier across most cities and rural areas in Finland during this time. The established political connection with Western Europe allowed people to move more freely across borders, and hence engage in the sex services market in Finland. Authorities estimated that in the 1990s the number of prostitutes working in Finland was approximately 2000, with 200 of these being of foreign origin. The effects of economic depression, mass unemployment and the resulting economic position of women also contributed to the intensification in the volume and forms of national prostitution. The increased trend of transnational organised crime in pandering and human trafficking operations shifted public concern from the protection of public morality to protection of public order and security.

The UN Trafficking Protocol, adopted in Finland in 2000, and the European Union Council Framework Decision on combating trafficking in human beings, adopted in 2002, both obligated cooperating states to criminalise trafficking and increase border control to prevent transnational organised crime. These international obligations acted as the starting point for the restructuring of prostitution legislation in Finland. In 2003, both the purchasing and selling of sexual acts were prohibited under Finnish law where either occurred in a public place.

== Types of Prostitution ==
=== Street prostitution ===
Street prostitution consisted of both foreign and native prostitutes; however, a majority of the bunch are foreign prostitutes. This was made up of the female prostitutes and males referred to as "kerb-crawlers" that sought out the "services" of the female prostitutes. Street prostitution made its way to the center of the capital city of Helsinki where it became very popular with about 50 street prostitutes. Local residents of Helsinki were upset with the allowance of street prostitution in their neighborhoods, so in 1994 a female activist group formed in order to abolish street prostitution as a whole. They started the movement called "Prostitution Off the Streets" where they patrolled the streets at night for any potential street prostitution as well as initiated a petition against street prostitution. This type of prostitution was legal until 1999 when laws prohibited prostitution in public spaces. This new law pushed the business of street prostitution north to the city of Vantaa until a year later when Vantaa also began prohibiting prostitution in public spaces.

=== Online prostitution ===
The Internet has become a popular place for advertising business; prostitution is no exception. Pictures of prostitutes and their services began being advertised online, with about 80%-90% of the industry utilising the internet in some capacity to advertise. In the early 2000s, Finland removed servers that advertised prostitution due to "procuring" that the Criminal Code has outlined since 2004. However, these operations are still being run remotely in countries such as Spain. This makes it difficult for police to take action against "procuring" online because, as behind the scenes operations are being taken care of remotely, they cannot trace any of the activity; they can only uncover the prostitute.

=== Erotic restaurants ===
Restaurants became a location for a lot of foreign prostitutes in Finland to sell their services, particularly in the city center of Helsinki. Restaurants were willing to partake in this form of prostitution because they were able to make a profit off of the prostitutes by charging them a fee when entering the restaurant for business as well as when they leave with a client. In addition to the fees, the women in erotic restaurants also lures more traffic into the restaurants which allowed the restaurants to profit even further.

=== Newspaper adverts ===
In Finland, newspaper publications promoted prostitution. This was a common form of advertising before the introduction of online prostitution in the early 2000s. However, the newspapers were not blatant in their advertising. They used phrases such as "company for daytime coffee" to suggest prostitution. Occasionally, the ads would reference a "massage", which was also a phrase that soon became synonymous with prostitution. In addition to these phrases, the newspaper ad included a phone number for the potential clients to call to obtain the desired services. Most of the newspaper ad clients, specifically, were men from Finland, rather than foreign clients. Newspaper ads for prostitution are no longer common due to the changing technological times.

== Legal framework ==
Buying or attempting to buy sex from a minor is illegal. The Public Law and Order Act prohibits offering or buying sex in a public place. Although prostitution has become legal, procuring still remains illegal. Procuring includes anything that would be considered the organisation or facilitation of services for prostitutes. The criminalisation of the purchase of sex from adults has been a continuing topic of discussion in the Nordic countries. In June 2006, parliament voted by 158 to 15, with four abstentions, to approve a bill which outlaws the buying of sexual acts if it is linked to human trafficking. The issue was raised again in 2013 by the Justice Minister. The current legal position in Finland therefore allows for the private sale of sexual acts but any form of human trafficking is both against the law and in breach of international human rights obligations.

Venla Roth comments that the current Finnish penal position can be seen as a compromise between the two conflicting positions on the legality of prostitution.

== Foreign prostitutes ==
A significant number of the prostitutes working in Finland are foreign. The proportion of the prostitutes that are migrants has increased over time, largely due to increased accessibility, political positions and economic factors. This increased accessibility may be attributed to the geographic location of Finland because of its proximity to other European countries as well as the fact that Finland is considered to be a transit country.

In 1999, a special section was enacted under the Aliens Act in Finland. It specifies that where there are reasonable grounds to suspect an alien may sell sexual acts, he or she may be refused entrance into the country. The provision was justified as an objective to protect Finnish citizens from the social disturbances caused by prostitutes coming in from the East.

=== Statistics ===
Following the enactment of the special provision, between 1999 and 2007, Border Guard authorities refused the entry of more than 1730 persons on the grounds of suspicion that they sold sexual acts or had earned their income though dishonest means. By 2006, this number had escalated to 3300 refusals. These figures continue to increase, with Finnish police reporting that during the years of 2011 and 2012, there were more persons than ever deported because of suspicions of the sale of sexual acts.

Despite legislative prevention measures, there continues to be a significant number of foreign prostitutes working in Finland. The National Bureau of Investigation estimated in 2002 that the annual number of foreign prostitutes was between 10,000 and 15,000, with most of them originating from Russia and Estonia, but also from other European countries. The Committee on the Elimination of All Forms of Discrimination Against Women (CEDAW) noted that the majority of prostitutes working in Finland are estimated to be either foreigners living permanently in Finland or travelling from country to country under tourist visas. The Finnish Bureau of Investigation suspects that almost all of these foreign prostitutes work under the control of organised procurers.

=== Implications and objections ===
The Aliens Act and the enforcement of the refusal to enter by authorities has been subject to polarised opinions and various human rights concerns.

In 2003 the National Bureau of Investigation stated trafficking of human beings for the purposes of sexual exploitation did not occur in Finland, and said that all foreign prostitutes were “fully aware of the nature and conditions of the work”. This statement, and the 1999 amendment of the Aliens Act, have however been severely critiqued on the basis that they ignore the disadvantaged status of foreign prostitutes. Marte Mesna argues that deporting foreigners where they are suspected of coming into the country to sell sex portrays that when there are people other than citizens involved, “it is the prostitutes who suddenly become the problem again”. Venla Roth also argues along these lines, claiming that placing foreign prostitutes outside of the public system means they are not protected and are more vulnerable to exploitation. Knowledge that a person has sold sexual acts in the past constitutes reasonable grounds to believe he or she intends to do it again, hence qualifying as a ground for denial of entrance into Finland.

== National advocacy ==
Pro-tukipiste r.y. (Pro Centre Finland), a registered non-profit organisation, supports and promotes the civil and human rights of sex workers in Finland, offering professional social support, health care services, and legal advice, operating in Helsinki and Tampere. Services are provided without charge, anonymously, and the centre is politically and religiously independent. It also offers consultation on issues concerning prostitution and human trafficking. They are a partner in the Indoors Project, a European Union initiative for analysis and policy recommendations on prostitution inside the EU.

Pro-tukipiste estimates that the number of individual persons in contact with the organisation and their services each year is between 1500 and 2000. The majority of these people are women with migrant backgrounds.

On a smaller scale, a union group by the name of SALLI, United Sex Professionals formed in 2002, also aimed to protect the human rights of sex workers in Finland. The group of nine sex workers that founded this organisation focused on "sex workers' human rights in terms of their well being, safety at work, professional skills, and control of workplace working conditions".

== Political and social debates ==
Legislation concerning the purchase of sexual acts remains subject to ongoing debate in Finland and the wider Nordic region. The two fundamental polarised views are those promoting legalisation of the profession and those promoting total abolition.

=== Legalisers ===
Legaliser is the term given to those who advocate for the rights of prostitutes, including the right to work. It is argued that the United Nations resolutions guaranteeing the right to work, such as the 1988 International Labour Organization recognition of sex work, align with promoting the rights of sex workers.

The U.S. Department of State's Bureau of Democracy, Human Rights and Labor, in its annual Country Report on Human Rights Practices for Finland, discuss discrimination in respect to employment and occupation in their 2016 report on Finland. While the Bureau does not explicitly state the law on prostitution to be in breach of the right to work, those who adopt the legalisation approach stress this relationship.

=== Abolitionists ===
Abolitionists are the people whom advocate for the opposing view in relation to prostitution. This argument is largely based on United Nations statements against prostitution from the early days of the League of Nations and the Palermo Protocol (2002) on preventing trafficking in persons, especially women and children. This position reflects the increased public concern about human trafficking and its connection to prostitution.

The Ministry of Social Affairs and Health in Finland started a five-year national programme for the Prevention of Prostitution and Violence against Women from 1998 to 2002, demonstrating its preference of total prohibition. The Minister of Social Affairs and Health, who chaired this programme, claims the negative health implications of prostitution raise concerns related to human rights and ethics. Finland's Minister of Justice, Anna-Maja Henriksson, argued for total prohibition of all forms of sex purchase in 2012.

=== Nordic model ===
The Nordic Model refers to the legal position of Sweden, where it is illegal to buy sexual acts, but the sale of one's own body for sexual acts is not illegal. This position attempts to reduce the demand for prostitution by "punishing" the clients instead of the prostitutes. The European Parliament advanced in a non-binding resolution passed on 26 February 2014 that all EU countries should adopt this approach. It was emphasised that prostitution violates human dignity and human rights, whether the work is forced or voluntary. The European Parliament therefore focuses on finding exit strategies and alternative sources of income for women working as prostitutes. This resolution, calling on the example of the Nordic model, was adopted by 343 votes to 139, with 105 abstentions.

=== International input ===
In September 2009, the Ministry of Justice submitted a report to Parliament. The report discussed the link between the demand for sexual "services" and human trafficking for the purposes of sexual exploitation. CEDAW however stress that the prevalence of trafficking is also influenced by multiple other factors, including those relating to economic and political instability. They therefore advance that it is important to view prostitution and the demand for sexual "services" and trafficking from a broad, holistic point of view.

Pro-tukipiste also provides their perspective in relation to the information in the Ministry of Justice report. They claim the data is bias, narrow, and questionable, with no voice given to those who sell the sexual acts. It is also suggested by the organisation in their own studies that the current law in Finland has caused the position of prostitutes to deteriorate, the risk of violence to increase, and has introduced further negative impacts for foreign workers.

The United States attributed Finland a Tier 2 rating through their State Department Trafficking in Person (TIP) Report League in 2003. Alongside Uganda and Albania, Finland was given this rating on the basis of rumours of "enclosed prostitution camps". The Finnish Minister of Justice and several EU allies rebutted the US claims.

=== Social perspectives ===
Over time, prostitution has become more accepted by people, predominately men, in Finland. The 2012 Gender Equality Barometer study showed that from 2004 to 2008, only 60% of men found it socially acceptable to pay prostitutes for sex. However, that number increased to 66% of males in 2012. This study also showed that men find it more socially acceptable to pay for sex than women do, as they are the main clientele for prostitution services. However, the number of men that actually reported purchasing sex in the Finsex survey conducted in 2007, was significantly lower around about 3% of men. Men buying "services" from prostitutes view it as a normal behavior that speaks to their sexuality. Whether these men are using prostitution as a way to avoid relationships or responsibilities, they enjoy the feeling of power they achieve through these acts.

In contrast, prostitution was often controversial for those opposed to it, as it was synonymous with drugs, crime, and immoral behavior. Street prostitution, specifically, was seen by residents as a downturn in their neighborhoods. Residents of neighborhoods in which street prostitution became increasingly popular viewed it as an issue of morality. They believed it was their moral duty to "clean" the streets of these prostitutes, because of the negative connotations it brought to their neighborhoods, which they believed would create a better environment for everyone.

== Research ==
The health of sex workers in Finland has been an ongoing project of the Finnish Government and data suggests a good level of health, and in particular an absence of sexually transmitted diseases.

The National Council of Women in Finland notes that obtaining evidence and research on the purchase of sexual services overall has proven difficult in practice, particularly from procured prostitutes. The Association suggests that authorities must either allocate sufficient resources to the enforcement of the current penal provision or reconsider the most appropriate legal position.

== Sex trafficking ==
Finland is a transit, destination, and limited source country for women and girls subjected to sex trafficking. Traffickers operate from abroad using threats of violence, debt leverage, and other forms of coercion. Victims originate primarily in Eastern Europe, West Africa, and Asia. Authorities report a surge in potential trafficking victims among rejected asylum-seekers returning to Finland under the Dublin Agreement, including a rise in the number of individuals exploited prior to their arrival in Finland, such as Nigerian women who account for the majority of sex trafficking victims.

The United States Department of State Office to Monitor and Combat Trafficking in Persons ranks Finland as a 'Tier 1' country.

== Bibliography ==
- Anne Maria Holli. Towards a new prohibitionism? State feminism, women's movements and prostitution policies in Finland, in Joyce Outshoorn (ed.) The Politics of Prostitution: Women's Movements, Democratic States and the Globalisation of Sex Commerce. Cambridge University Press 2004
- Anne Maria Holli. Debating prostitution/trafficking in Sweden and Finland. 2004
- Charlotta Holmström & May-Len Skilbrei. Prostitution in the Nordic Countries. 2008
- Charlotta Holmström, May-Len Skilbrei. Prostitution Policy in the Nordic Region: Ambiguous Sympathies. Ashgate 2013
- Matti Lehti and Kauko Aroma. Trafficking in Human Beings, Illegal Immigration and Finland. 2002
- Gregg Bucken-Knapp, Johan Karlsson Schaffer, Pia Levin. Comrades, Push The Red Button! Prohibiting the Purchase of Sexual Services in Sweden, but Not in Finland 2012 (excerpt)
- Gregg Bucken-Knapp, Johan Karlsson, Karin Persson Strömbäck. Prostitution Policy Reform and the Causal Role of Ideas: A Comparative Study of Policy-Making in the Nordic Countries. 2009
- Tage Alalehto. Eastern Prostitution from Russia to Sweden and Finland. Journal of Scandinavian Studies in Criminology and Crime Prevention 01/2002; 3(1):96-111. DOI:10.1080/140438502762467236
