= Bickers =

Bickers is a surname. Notable people with the surname include:

- Dave Bickers (1938–2014), English motocross racer
- Matilda Bickers, American artist, writer, and sex worker rights activist
- Robert Bickers (born 1964), British historian
- Terry Bickers (born 1965), English musician and songwriter

== See also ==
- Bicker (disambiguation)
