= Mickey Meji =

South African women's rights activist (1980–2026)

- Born: Nomonde Mihlali Meji; 9 September 1980; Cape Town, South Africa
- Died: 13 August 2026 (aged 45)
- Occupation: Human rights activist
- Known for: Advocacy against sexual exploitation and prostitution
- Children: 3
- Awards: Advancing Freedom Award (2022)

Nomonde Mihlali "Mickey" Meji (9 September 1980 – 13 August 2026) was a South African activist for the rights of women and girls and against sexual exploitation and prostitution. Originally from Mthatha (Umtata) in the Eastern Cape, she was a survivor of prostitution and took part in several national and international initiatives on human rights, the response to HIV/AIDS, and public policy on prostitution.

== Biography ==
=== Early life and education ===
Meji was born on 9 September 1980. She held a qualification in communication and journalism.

=== Career ===
Her personal experience as a survivor was central to her public work. In her speeches, she linked economic and social inequality in South Africa and the legacy of apartheid to the forms of sexual exploitation faced by some women.

She worked with the South African organisation Embrace Dignity, which campaigns for the abolition of prostitution and supports women affected by human trafficking and prostitution. Meji also helped found survivor organisations and networks, and represented civil society in several national and international forums.

In 2016, Meji joined Embrace Dignity as a programme officer for survivor support. Her work focused on women's rights, sexual exploitation, human trafficking, and the social and health consequences of prostitution.

She also helped build survivor networks. With other survivors of prostitution, she contributed to the emergence of a survivor movement in Africa and founded the Survivors Support and Empowerment Programme, which supports and empowers people who have experienced prostitution.

=== Advocacy ===
Meji spoke at conferences and debates on human rights, prostitution and public health. She took part in the 5th South African AIDS Conference and the International Conference on AIDS and STIs in Africa (ICASA), where she also presented research.

In March 2018, she led a delegation of survivors at a hearing held by the Multi-Party Women's Caucus of the Parliament of South Africa on proposed law reform concerning adult prostitution. There she argued for an abolitionist approach and criticised the criminalisation of people who sell sex.

Meji supported the legislative model promoted by Embrace Dignity as the "Sankara Equality Act". The proposal would decriminalise the selling of sexual services while criminalising their purchase and certain forms of facilitating prostitution, combined with exit and support programmes, an approach similar to the Nordic model.

She also criticised the legalisation and regulation of prostitution adopted in some countries, arguing that these models do not eliminate the mechanisms of sexual exploitation.

=== National and international roles ===
Meji served on several bodies dealing with public health, human rights and women's policy.

She represented non-governmental organisations for Africa on the Programme Coordinating Board of the Joint United Nations Programme on HIV/AIDS (UNAIDS). She was also a member of the South African National AIDS Council (SANAC), where she held a sector representative role.

She took part in national, regional and international conferences and meetings on women's rights, HIV and sexual exploitation.

=== Personal life and death ===
Meji was the mother of three children. She died on 13 August 2026, aged 45, a few weeks before her 46th birthday.

== Recognition ==
Meji received the Advancing Freedom Award at the Coalition to End Sexual Exploitation (CESE) Summit for her work against sexual exploitation and in support of survivors.
