= LGBTQ rights in Suriname =

- Suriname
- Legal status: Legal since 1869
- Gender identity: Gender change is allowed. Court order required.
- Military: Yes
- Discrimination protections: Yes, sexual orientation protections. Gender identity protection only in employment. (see below)

Family rights
- Recognition of relationships: Recognition of same-sex couples
- Adoption: No

Lesbian, gay, bisexual, transgender and queer (LGBTQ) people in Suriname face some legal challenges not experienced by non-LGBTQ residents. Both male and female expressions of same-sex sexual activity are legal in Suriname. Since 2015, hate speech and discrimination in employment and the provision of goods and services on the basis of sexual orientation has been banned in the country. Gender identity is protected for the first time under Employment Equal Treatment Act 2022.

Same-sex marriage and civil unions are not recognised by law. Nevertheless, Suriname is legally bound to the January 2018 Inter-American Court of Human Rights ruling, which held that same-sex marriage is a human right protected by the American Convention on Human Rights.

While homosexuality tends to be viewed as a taboo topic, the situation and attitudes have slowly changed in recent years.

== Legality of same-sex sexual activity ==
Same-sex sexual activity has been legal in Suriname since 1869. The age of consent in Suriname is 16 regardless of sexual orientation. Article 302 of the 1910 Penal Code, which stipulated that the age of consent for same-sex sexual acts was 18, was amended in 2015.

== Recognition of same-sex relationships ==
Recognition of same-sex unions in South America Marriage Other type of partnership Unrecognized Constitution limits marriage to opposite-sex couples Same-sex sexual activity illegal, though penalties not enforced

Same-sex marriages, civil unions or domestic partnerships are possible in Suriname.

In February 2023, the Constitutional Court ruled the ban on same-sex marriage does not violate the constitution or Suriname's obligations under the Interamerican Convention on Human Rights. However, the court also found that the Civil Code is outdated and needs to be modernized following public debate.

On 13 February 2025, this was overruled. Judge Shanti Bikhari ruled that the laws used to disallow same sex marriage are in conflict with the International Covenant on Civil and Political Rights and Interamerican Convention on Human Rights. The judge also ruled that the state should change the relevant laws and that the Bureau of Civil Affairs is required to required to register the marriages. This may still be overruled, however.

== Discrimination protections ==
In March 2015, the Government introduced hate speech legislation which includes sexual orientation as a ground for non-discrimination complaints. Specifically, articles 175, 175a and 176 of the Surinamese Penal Code were updated to include sexual orientation. Violation of this law can result in a prison sentence of up to one year or a fine. In addition, articles 176c and 500a forbid discrimination based on sexual orientation in employment and the provision of goods and services.

In 2022, Parliament passed the Employment Equal Treatment Act, which bans workplace discrimination based on race, ethnicity, religion, gender identity and sexual orientation, among others.

Despite the protective legislation, the LGBTQ community continues to face discrimination from society. In 2014, the Government explicitly excluded LGBTQ people from social security legislation. According to the United States Department of State, some members of Parliament and the then-Vice President spoke out openly against LGBTQ persons, comparing homosexuality to a "disease" and inciting hatred and violence. Additionally, in 2015, there were reports of societal discrimination against the LGBTQ community in the areas of employment and housing.

== Gender identity and expression ==
In January 2017, the Eerste Kantongerecht (one of 3 Courts of First Instance in Suriname) granted a transgender woman the right to have her gender formally changed with the Central Bureau of Civil Affairs and ordered the registry to officially change her registration to reflect her amended status. The Association of Pentecostal Churches in Suriname (VVPES) and the Suriname Islamic Association (SIV), which had protested against and opposed the right to recognize a gender change, indicated they would "accept the verdict". In February 2017, the Central Bureau of Civil Affairs formally appealed the court ruling. In January 2022, the Suriname Court of Appeal ruled in favor and ordered the gender change on the birth certificate of the transgender woman who had undergone sex reassignment surgery in 2009.

== Activism ==
Suriname's first public gay rights march took place on 11 October 2011 (National Coming Out Day, Nationale kom-uit-de-kastdag in Dutch) in Paramaribo, following MP Ronny Asabina's comments against homosexuality in June. Two members of the National Assembly, including Harish Monorath, attended the event. It was partly organized by Suriname Men United, the largest gay men's organization in the country.

Other LGBT groups include PAREA and the LGBTQ Platform Suriname. Both are active in raising awareness of LGBTQ people, organising seminars with the police force on recognizing anti-LGBTQ violence, and pressing for the legal recognition of same-sex couples.

In late 2016, Justice Minister Jennifer van Dijk-Silos organized several public hearings in collaboration with civil society in Suriname to discuss the expansion of the rights of LGBTQ people.

== Public opinion ==
A 2010 opinion poll carried out by Vanderbilt University showed that 10.3% of the Surinamese population supported same-sex marriage.

In May 2015, PlanetRomeo, an LGBTQ social network, published its first Gay Happiness Index (GHI). Gay men from over 120 countries were asked about how they feel about society's view on homosexuality, how do they experience the way they are treated by other people and how satisfied are they with their lives. Suriname was ranked 46th with a GHI score of 48.

== Summary table ==
Same-sex sexual activity legal	Yes (Since 1869)
Equal age of consent	Yes (Since 2015)
Anti-discrimination laws in employment only	Yes (Since 2015)
Anti-discrimination laws in the provision of goods and services	Yes (Since 2015)
Anti-discrimination laws in all other areas (incl. indirect discrimination, hate speech)	Yes (Since 2015)
Same-sex marriages	No
Recognition of same-sex couples	No
Stepchild adoption by same-sex couples	No
Joint adoption by same-sex couples	No
LGBTQ people allowed to serve openly in the military	Yes (There are no bans or restrictions on LGBTIQ+ people serving in the military of Suriname)
Right to change legal gender	Yes (Since 2022)
Access to IVF for lesbians	No
Commercial surrogacy for gay male couples	No (Commercial surrogacy is illegal for all couples regardless of sexual orientation)
MSMs allowed to donate blood	Yes

== See also ==
- LGBTQ rights in the Americas
