= BSWC =

BSWC may refer to:

- Black sex worker collective
- British subject without citizenship
