= National Association of Nigerian Prostitutes =

Professional organization

- Abbreviation: NANP
- Location: Nigeria
- Members: Sex workers
- Official language: English
- President: Tamar Tion
- Secretary General: Sandra Efosa

The National Association of Nigerian Prostitutes (NANP) is a professional organization based in Nigeria to assist adult sex workers. The organization was formed out of opposition to the country's prostitution laws which criminalize sex work and all of its related activities. NANP campaigns for equal access to healthcare, a safe work environment and protection from abuse and exploitation. It is headed by a president who is elected by association members every 12 months. As of August 2015, the president of NANP was Jessica Elvis. She held the post until her death from a heart-related disease on 25 October 2015. The current president and secretary general are Tamar Tion and Sandra Efosa respectively.

== See also ==
- Sex-positive movement
- Violence against prostitutes
- Patoo Abraham
