= Nordic model approach to prostitution =

Approach to prostitution law first instituted in Sweden in 1999

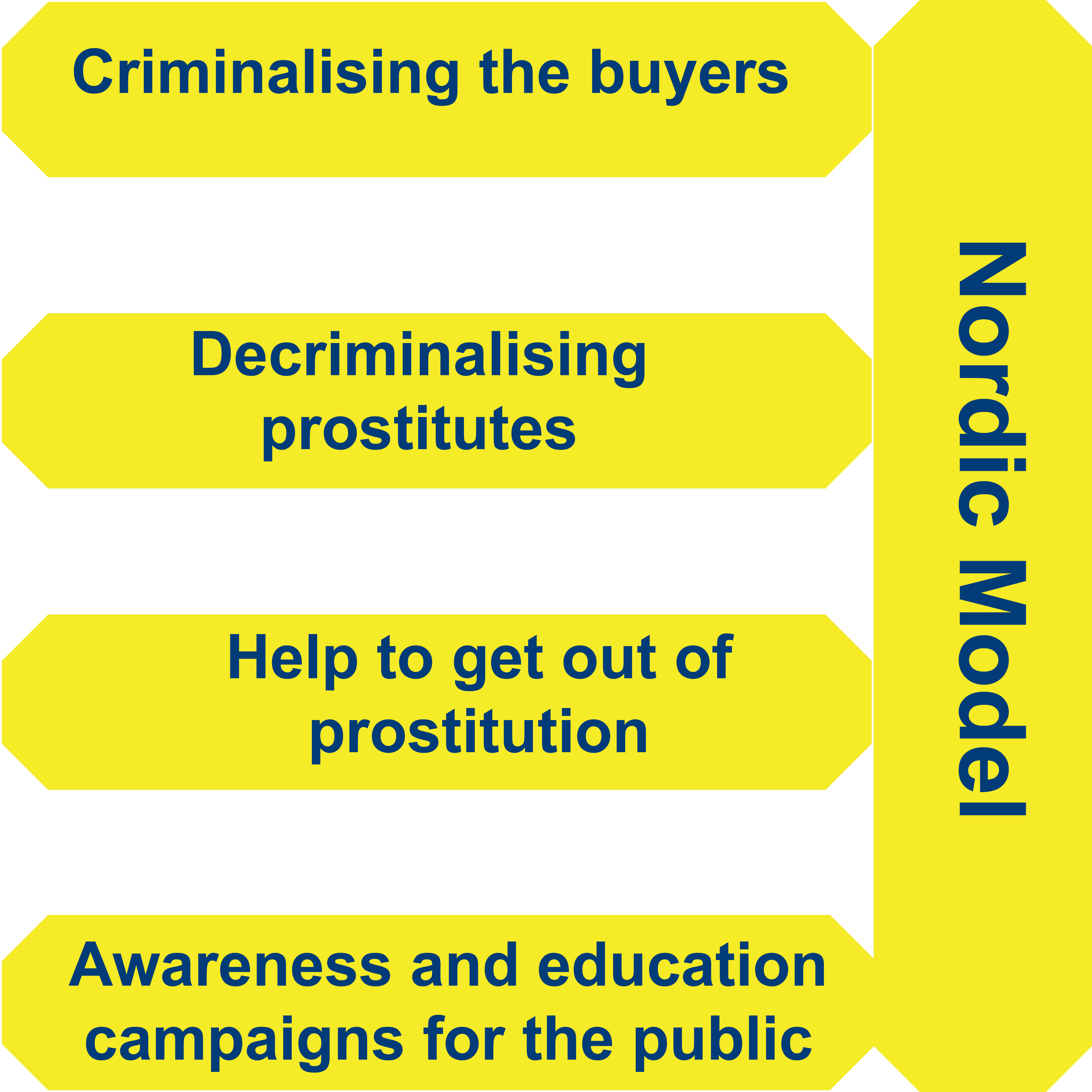
- Also known as: End demand Equality model Neo-abolitionism; Partial decriminalization Sex buyer law Swedish model
- Adopted by: Sweden (1999); Norway (2009); Iceland (2009); Canada (2014); Northern Ireland (2015); France (2016); Ireland (2017); Israel (2018); Maine (2023)

The Nordic Model approach to sex work, also known as the end demand, equality model, neo-abolitionism, Nordic and Swedish model, is an approach to prostitution that criminalises clients, third parties and many of the ways sex workers operate.

This approach to criminalising sex work was developed in Sweden in 1998 mainly by the adoption of the parliamentary "Women's Peace" bill (Swedish: Kvinnofridslagen) which "situated prostitution in the context of sex inequality—rather than, as has been common, among crimes against morality, decency, or public order". It was argued, notably by legal scholar Catharine A. MacKinnon and radical feminist Andrea Dworkin who had been invited by a Swedish women's rights organization, that a law which assumed gender equality by criminalizing both buyer and seller would not be effective at tackling the inequality and exploitation of women.

The main objective of the model is to abolish the sex industry by punishing the purchase of sexual services.

The model was first instituted in Sweden in 1999 and then into effect in Norway in 2009 as part of the Sex Buyer Law. As of 2023, eight countries and one US state have adopted the model in full or in part.

Organizations for the rights of sex workers, such as the Global Network of Sex Work Projects, as well as global human rights organizations like Human Rights Watch and Amnesty International, do not support the Nordic model, and have called for the decriminalization of sex work.

== Implementations ==
- Sweden (1999)
- Norway (2009)
- Iceland (2009)
- Canada (2014)
- Northern Ireland (2015)
- France (2016)
- Ireland (2017)
- Israel (2020)
- One state of the United States :
  - Maine (2023)

== Efficacy after implementation ==
=== Canada ===
Canada passed the Protection of Communities and Exploited Persons Act (PCEPA), a version of the Nordic model law in 2014. The Women's Coalition for the Abolition of Prostitution, a pan-Canadian coalition of equality-seeking women's groups has been campaigning to end prostitution in Canada. They were instrumental in lobbying for the legislation to be introduced in Canada. Researchers at the Centre for Gender & Sexual Health Equity found that implementation of the law caused prostitutes to experience "significantly reduced access to critical health and sex worker/community-led services"; the authors concluded that full decriminalization would best provide labour and human rights to sex workers.

In February 2020, an Ontario court judge struck down three parts of the PCEPA as unconstitutional: the prohibitions on advertising, procuring, and materially benefiting from someone else's sexual services were violations of the freedom of expression and security of the person as defined in the Canadian Charter of Rights and Freedoms. However, those provisions were then later upheld by the Ontario Court of Appeal.

=== France ===
In France, the practice of prostitution and soliciting are not penalised, but the purchase of sexual services has been illegal and punished since the law of 13 April 2016, by which France joined the so-called "penalisation of clients" model, often referred to as "neo-abolitionist".

In 2019, an Ipsos survey questioned more than 1,000 French people on how they perceive the 2016 law and prostitution in general. The survey showed that 71% of French people are opposed to repealing the 2016 law. On the other hand, 78% believe that this law represents a positive step forward. Finally, of the various measures proposed to combat the vulnerability of persons in prostitution, only 4% believe that repealing the law would be the most effective solution. The difference between men and women is significant in this survey, particularly when it comes to perceptions of prostitution: 66% of men see it as "violence", compared with 81% of women.

In 2021, five years after the adoption of the 2016 law aimed at combating the prostitution system, its application remains very limited. There are few fines for the purchase of sexual acts (around 4,500 since the law came into force) and they are very unevenly distributed across the country. In 2018, some départements had only one. Only 6% of public prosecutors' offices had implemented the awareness-raising courses provided for by the law, even though these have a strong impact on participants. In addition, the human resources allocated to the fight against trafficking and procuring are derisory: eight police officers in Paris and twenty investigators nationwide. Finally, although the law provides for the transfer of seizures linked to trafficking to support people wishing to leave the prostitutional system, the €14 million seized between 2017 and 2018 had still not been paid to the Women's Rights and Equality Department at the time of publication (2021).

=== Iceland ===
In 2009, after opinion polls indicated that 70% of the population supported banning the purchase of sexual services, paying for sex was outlawed. The new law placed Iceland in line with Norway and Sweden; however, prostitution in Iceland is thriving despite paying for sex being illegal. A report published in 2017 by the National Commissioner of the Icelandic Police stated that prostitution had exploded in the previous 18 months. The vast majority of prostitutes in the country are foreign, and police believe that prostitution in Iceland is partially tied to organized crime and human trafficking, as the country has become a sex tourism destination.

There are several factors which prevent the full implementation of the law. One is that suspected victims of human trafficking refuse to cooperate with the police and refuse to testify against their traffickers; another factor is that tourism has increased significantly in Iceland overall during recent years, heightening the demand for prostitutes. Because Iceland is part of the Schengen zone, it is easy for traffickers to smuggle victims from poorer countries of the European Union to Iceland and have them stay there within the three-months rule without them being registered officially. The report stated that no substantial change in attitude has yet occurred within the justice system of Iceland. Trials are often held privately without there being any effect on the reputation of the man being tried for buying sex, and the fines that are given out are also comparatively low.

Women from Eastern Europe, the Baltics, and South America are subjected to sex trafficking in Iceland, often in nightclubs and bars. The United States Department of State's Office to Monitor and Combat Trafficking in Persons downgraded Iceland's ranking in 2017 from a Tier 1 to a Tier 2 country.

=== Ireland ===
The Republic of Ireland's Criminal Law (Sexual Offences) Act 2017 criminalized the purchase of sex with a prostitute. Since the law was introduced, violent crimes against sex workers have "almost doubled". In 2020, the Irish Journal of Sociology published a research paper that analyzed data from the years 2015 to 2019, spanning two years before and after the act. The researchers reported that "crimes (including violent offences) against prostitutes increased following the introduction of the new law and continued with low levels of reporting of said crimes to the police." The authors concluded that the best way to reduce violence against prostitutes is through the full decriminalization of sex work.

=== Northern Ireland ===
Northern Ireland implemented a version of the Nordic model approach in 2015: the Human Trafficking and Exploitation (Criminal Justice and Support for Victims) Act (Northern Ireland) 2015. The Anti-Trafficking Review published a criticism of the law which argued that "the sex purchase ban in Northern Ireland is essentially meant to send a moral message about the unacceptability of commercial sex rather than effectively reduce trafficking." The research conducted has been criticized as faulty by Julie Bindel as it gathered data from a website run by convicted brothel owners.

=== Norway ===
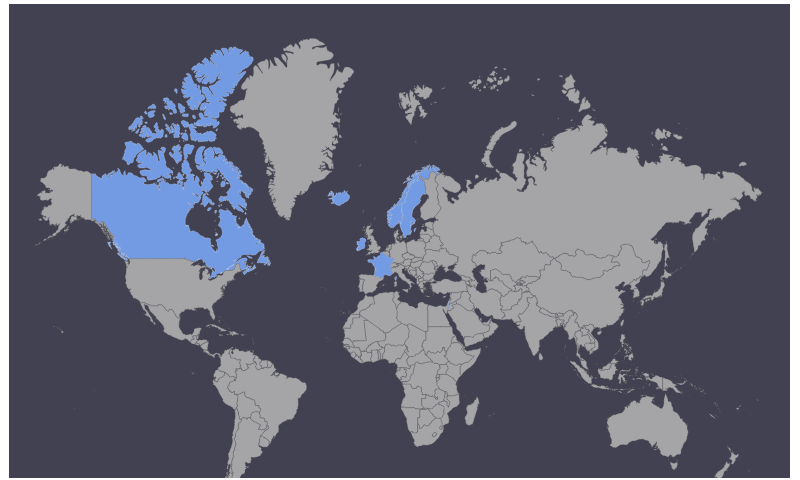
Countries that have adopted the Nordic model or similar approach on prostitution (2019)

Neo-abolitionist laws have been debated in Norway since 1997. During that time, the Norwegian government conducted several evaluations of the prostitution laws in the Netherlands and Sweden. The prostitution laws in both countries were seen as faulty. Driven by a desire to reduce human trafficking in the sex industry, the Sexkjøpsloven (Sex Purchase Act) was ultimately passed in 2009 by a coalition led by Labour Party member Jens Stoltenberg. The coalition was composed of party members from the Centre Party (Senterpartiet), the Labour Party (Arbeiderpartiet), and the Socialist Left Party (Sosialistisk Venstreparti). In 2010, the Sexkjøpsloven was expanded to ban the purchase of sex from anyone under the age of 18.

In the 2013 Norwegian parliamentary election, the Conservative Party (Høyre), the Green Party (Miljøpartiet de Grønne), the Liberal Party (Venstre), and the Progress Party (Fremskrittspartiet) advocated for a repeal of the Sex Purchase Act, claiming a lack of political support for the law. As in 2013, they failed to get a sufficient majority in the 2017 Norwegian parliamentary election; as of 2014, they hold 80 out of 169 parliamentary seats combined. The majority coalition, consisting of the Centre Party, the Christian Democratic Party (Kristeleg Folkeparti), the Labour Party, and the Socialist Left Party, support the Sex Purchase Act.

The practical effects of the law are in dispute. A report conducted by the Norwegian authorities five years after the law came into effect found that the model had a dampening effect on prostitution and reduced sex trafficking; however, other academics say that there are too many uncertainties in the data to claim success. The Co-ordination Unit for Victims of Trafficking in Norway reported that the number of identified potential victims of trafficking for sexual exploitation increased every year between 2007 and 2012. Although the figure dropped in 2013, the number of victims was still higher than in 2007. The number of victims again increased in 2014. A government report found that there was no evidence that violence against sex workers had increased, and that the street prostitution market fell to 45–60% relative to the levels before the law was introduced. Other reports estimated that the total prostitution market decreased in volume by 25%, but the reliability of these figures has been questioned by other academics.

Surveys of prostitutes suggest that customer attitudes and behavior changed after the law was introduced. Prostitutes reported that fewer young men, fewer upper-class men, and more foreigners purchased sex services after the law was passed. Men had a more negative attitude toward purchasing sex services. Surveys also found that prostitutes were afraid to file charges against violent customers due to a fear of being evicted, even though it is illegal to evict prostitutes for violations of the act. Landlords evicted prostitutes out of fear of prosecution under laws that banned profiting from the income of the prostitutes. Landlords also said that police would contact them and ask them to evict prostitutes.

=== Sweden ===
In 2008, the Swedish government appointed a special committee of inquiry known as the Committee of Inquiry to Evaluate the Ban against the Purchase of Sexual Services, headed by the former Supreme Court Justice Anna Skarhed. Its purpose was to evaluate how the law had affected the sex industry since its implementation in 1999 until 2008. The report stated that street prostitution had been reduced by half; it reported that in Copenhagen, Oslo, and Stockholm, street prostitution was at similar levels in 1999, but it was three times higher in Copenhagen and Oslo than in Stockholm in 2008. The police had focused on reducing street prostitution also as a signal to the public, as that form of prostitution was the most visible. The committee further stated that public opinion had changed more in comparison to that in Denmark and Norway, and that 70% of the population were in favour of the ban on the purchase of sexual services in Sweden. The committee added a caveat that as prostitution and trafficking are complex issues often carried out in secret and surveys are often limited in scope, any data should be treated with caution.

The Committee on Women's Rights and Gender Equality of the European Parliament stated in 2013 that "Sweden's prostituted population is one-tenth of neighbouring Denmark's where sex purchase is legal and has a smaller population. The law has also changed public opinion. In 1996, 45% of women and 20% of men were in favour of criminalising male sex purchasers. By 2008, 79% of women and 60% of men were in favour of the law. Moreover, the Swedish police confirm that the Nordic model has had a deterrent effect on trafficking for sexual exploitation." It has also been reported that 12.5% of men used to solicit prostitutes before the implementation of the law in 1999, whereas in 2014 only 7.7% of men purchased sexual services.

A 2013 report by the Swedish government stated that street prostitution had halved in the previous 10 years but that escort advertisements had increased from 304 to 6,965; however, the report also stated that an increase in advertisements did not necessarily mean that the number of escorts had increased. A 2014 study examining the efficacy of the law concluded that it had "failed in its abolitionist ambition to decrease levels of prostitution, since there [was] no reliable data demonstrating any overall decline in people selling sex." In December 2017, the Global Network of Sex Work Projects disputed the positive impact of the Nordic model in Sweden, saying the law is "harmful to prostitutes", and that it had resulted in increased police surveillance, discrimination, and social stigmatization, and decreased access to health and social services.

== Criticism ==
The Nordic model is controversial and receives both support and opposition across the political spectrum. Supporters of the Nordic model include feminist organizations such as the American National Organization for Women, anti-sex trafficking NGOs such as Coalition Against Trafficking in Women, and political parties such as the Spanish Socialist Workers' Party. Many sex worker rights, aid organizations, and civil-liberties organizations oppose the Nordic model, and call for complete decriminalization, including the American Civil Liberties Union, Amnesty International, Human Rights Watch, the Joint United Nations Programme on HIV/AIDS, and the World Health Organization.

In 2012, researchers in Germany, Switzerland, and the United Kingdom examined the effect that legalization of prostitution had on human trafficking. The overall conclusion was that human trafficking inflows increased and that trafficking was overall not reduced because the substitution of illegal prostitution with legal prostitution could not compensate for the higher number of people being trafficked. The increase in illegal prostitution following the legalization of prostitution might be caused by two factors: illegal supply can masquerade as legal, and legalization reduces the stigma associated with the consumption of the banned service. The Danish National Board of Social Services estimated that after prostitution was legalized in Denmark in 1999, the volume of prostitution increased by 40% between 2002 and 2009. Some studies within Europe suggest that human trafficking is lower in countries where prostitution and its procurement are illegal and highest in countries in which prostitution is legalized.

Other academics argue that there is insufficient evidence that the Nordic model reduces demand, and arguing that the Nordic model push prostitution underground through the black market. In addition, some researchers claim that the Nordic model does little to reduce harms to sex workers. In 2016, Amnesty International released a 100-page report claiming that Nordic model laws caused sex workers to face ongoing risk of police harassment, client violence, discrimination, eviction, and exploitation. Figures provided by National Ugly Mugs, a service which allows sex workers to confidentially report incidents of abuse and crime, showed that reports of abuse and crime against prostitutes greatly increased after Ireland's adoption of the Nordic model approach to prostitution by criminalizing the purchase of sexual services. The figures stated that crimes against prostitutes increased by 90%, with violent crime increasing by 92%.

=== Legal challenge in France at the European Court of Human Rights ===
A 2019 analysis by Le Bail, Giametta, and Rassouw of France's adoption of the Nordic model approach to prostitution found that "42 per cent of prostitutes were more exposed to violence and 38 per cent have found it increasingly difficult to make sure men use condoms." In response to this study Nordic Model Now, a British not-for-profit company describing itself as feminist, published a criticism of its methodology and conclusions.

Meanwhile in 2019, a total of 261 migrant, queer, and women sex workers in France took the French government to the European Court of Human Rights (ECtHR), saying that their fundamental human rights had been violated due to the adoption and enforcement of the new 2016 law, which Médecins du Monde stated had forced them to work in secluded, dangerous locations after the law criminalised their clients. As a result, more than ten sex workers in France had reportedly been murdered within half a year, some of them allegedly due to police brutality targeting the sex workers. According to the applicants, the French law was thus breaching their rights under Articles 2 (right to life), 3 (prohibition of inhuman or degrading treatment) and 8 (right to respect to private life) of the European Convention on Human Rights. On 31 August 2023, the ECtHR declared the complaint of the 261 sex workers against France's Nordic model law admissible for a hearing. The admissibility meant that the Court found that the applicants were entitled to claim to be victims under Article 34 of the Convention. On 25 July 2024, the court ruled that the French laws are not in breach of Article 8 of the European Convention on Human rights.

== Bibliography ==
- Bucken-Knapp, Gregg; Karlsson Schaffer, Johan (2008). "Prostitution Policy Reform and the Causal Role of Ideas: A Comparative Study of Policymaking in the Nordic Countries". Statsvetenskaplig Tidskrift. 110 (1): 59–65. doi:10.2139/ssrn.2066566. ISSN 0039-0747. SSRN 2066566.
- Calderaro, Charlène; Giametta, Calogero (2 April 2019). "'The Problem of Prostitution': Repressive Policies in the Name of Migration Control, Public Order, and Women's Rights in France". Anti-Trafficking Review (12): 155–171. doi:10.14197/atr.2012191210. ISSN 2286-7511. S2CID 159063539.
- Carline, Anna; Scoular, Jane (1 November 2014). "A Critical Account of a 'Creeping Neo-Abolitionism': Regulating Prostitution in England and Wales" (PDF). Criminology & Criminal Justice. 14 (5): 608–626. doi:10.1177/1748895814543534. ISSN 1748-8958. S2CID 55061409.
- Holmström, Charlotta; Skilbrei, May-Len (August 2011). "Is There a Nordic Prostitution Regime?". Crime and Justice. 40 (1). University of Chicago Press: 479–517. doi:10.1086/659841. JSTOR 10.1086/659841. S2CID 145012702.
- Vuolajärvi, Niina (July 2018). "Governing in the Name of Caring—the Nordic Model of Prostitution and its Punitive Consequences for Migrants Who Sell Sex". Sexuality Research and Social Policy. 16 (3). Springer: 151–165. doi:10.1007/s13178-018-0338-9. ISSN 1868-9884. S2CID 149979498.
- Waltman, Max (October 2011). "Prohibiting Sex Purchasing and Ending Trafficking: The Swedish Prostitution Law". Michigan Journal of International Law. 33 (1). University of Michigan Law School: 137–138. ISSN 1052-2867.
- White, Sabrina (29 February 2020). "Canadian Sex Work Policy, the Failure of the 'Nordic Model,' and Future Approaches". Public Policy and Governance Review.
