= Bicker =

Bicker may refer to:

- Petty arguing
- Bicker, Lincolnshire
- Bicker, a practice in the eating clubs at Princeton University and Mount Olive College
- Bicker (family), a Dutch Golden Age family, headed by Andries Bicker
- Bicker Isles, an island group in South Australia

== See also ==
- Bickers, surname
