= Hydra (association) =

German advocacy group for prostitutes

Hydra e. V.
- Formation: 1980; 46 years ago
- Founded at: Berlin, Germany
- Type: Non-profit
- Headquarters: Köpenicker Straße, Berlin
- Services: Sex workers' rights
- Website: www.hydra-berlin.de

Hydra e. V. is a German self-help and advocacy group for prostitutes. The self- proclaimed "Hurenorganisation" (lit. 'whore organisation') is a non-profit association that was founded in 1980 by interested women as the first West German organisation of the Sex Workers' Rights Movement. The club name refers to the Hydra, a nine-headed sea monster in Greek and Roman mythology.

== Objectives ==
Since 1985, Hydra has partially been funded with public funds, so that a permanent counselling centre in Berlin could be established. Among other things, it informs about health issues, in particular AIDS and other sexually transmitted diseases. In addition to the counselling centre, Hydra participates in lobbying and public relations to improve the legal and social situation of prostitutes. The purposes of the association are:

1. the promotion of social protection and cultural integration of prostitutes,
2. the promotion of vocational training of prostitutes as an aid to the transition to other occupations.

Some of Hydra's employees have their own experience as prostitution. Club membership is restricted to women, while supporting membership is also open to men.

== Formation ==
The foundation of the association goes back to the counselling centre for venereal diseases of the Berlin-Charlottenburg health department, which had existed since 1915, from which, in 1979, the idea for an autonomous prostitute organisation was born. As prostitutes, among others, came to the counselling centre, at the end of 1979, social workers, female teachers, lawyers, doctors, and female psychologists working there formed the Association for the Promotion of Vocational and Cultural Education of Female Prostitutes e. V. The aim was to provide practical help services for prostitutes, and to counteract their social discrimination. In July 1980, four of those involved, together with 10 female students, opened a seminar on prostitution at the Free University of Berlin in the Spielhagenstraße in Berlin-Charlottenburg, the Café Hydra. The contact and consultancy shop was the first of its kind in Germany. In the autumn 1980, two more social worker interns were added, so that, in addition to regular opening hours, a large number of working groups were offered. The rent was taken over by a foundation for two years and funded for 6 months by a "Self-Help Initiative Network"; otherwise, the project was funded by donations. In the spring of 1981, it was decided to occupy to a house to provide more room. With the support of the socio-pedagogical institute "Arbeiterwohlfahrt", a vacant house in Potsdamer Straße, Berlin, was found that could be legally moved into, and renovation started. During the winter of 1981, several of the involved women retired for professional reasons; so, the future of the project was in doubt. The impetus for the further development was given by one of the Hydra initiators, with plans for their own newspaper and a Christmas party. In February 1982, the work was resumed. In addition to a monthly donation of 200 DM came at an event in August that raised 2000 DM, with which running costs and other activities could be financed. Thus, the magazine Hydra-Nachtexpress was published, and contacts to prostitute projects in Hamburg and Lyon were made.

The funds approved by the Berlin Senate for 1983 for two rented offices and the establishment of a café could not initially be paid out because no suitable space was found. Therefore, in 1984, after a period of uncertainty, an amended application for an advisory centre with two part-time staff posts was requested, and approved at the end of October 1984. Thus, at the end of 1984, office space was moved to Kantstraße, and in January 1985, regular opening hours commenced.

== Activities ==
A focus of the association work soon centred on providing information on the immunodeficiency syndrome AIDS, which at that time was little known by the public or was seen as only as a disease among gays. In addition, staff members contacted authorities, which in most cases proved to be unfruitful, due to prejudice and fears of contact, such as the request to employment offices for support in the integration of prostitutes into the rest of the labour market. In August 1985, Der Spiegel published an article about Hydra, who made the project known beyond Berlin. At the end of October 1985, the first National Hurenkongress (Whore Congress) was organised, in conjunction with the Huren wehren sich gemeinsam (HWG, e. V.), which was founded in Frankfurt. The topic of AIDS also became increasingly common in the media from the summer of 1985 onwards. As part of AIDS education and prevention, and in cooperation with the Berlin State Institute for Tropical Medicine, two additional posts were approved from December 1985.

The association was increasingly perceived as an expert on AIDS, for example, at a public hearing in 1986 in the Bundestag on AIDS. Although desired by prostitutes, clients were reluctant to accept the use of condoms. Therefore, Hydra demanded that education be extended not only among the so-called risk groups, but to the whole population. In the spring of 1986, there were discussions with the then-Berlin senator for health and social affairs, Ulf Fink, which promised further support. In 1986, Hydra participated in a Senate education campaign and participated in three other prostitution congresses.

From 1980 to 1995, Hydra issued its own magazine, HYDRA night express ("newspaper for bar, brothel, and curb"), which included news, interviews, reports of the situation of prostitutes in other countries and exit options. It now appears alongside other information materials as a leaflet.

In 1986, Hydra lobbied for the abolition of the law against sexually transmitted diseases. While the Greens supported the proposals for amendments to the Anti-Discrimination Law, the proposals were postponed due to the rotation principle.

The organisation participated in the z. B. Exhibition in pharmacies on the subject of condoms, and organised demonstrations and advertising for the use of condoms. They also provide information education on the living conditions of prostitutes, and have received invitations to numerous events and hearings.

To celebrate its 25th anniversary, Hydra participated in the Karneval der Kulturen (Carnival of Culture) in 2005, organising an exhibition entitled "25 years of Hydra".

Under the direction of the author Rochus Hahn from the publisher Schwarzer Turm, the comic series Hurengeschichten, which was compiled from interviews with Hydra members, details the life and work of professional prostitutes.

== Related organizations and initiatives ==
There are about a dozen counseling centers for prostitutes in Germany. Hydra inspired the foundation of the Frankfurt Initiative Huren wehren sich gemeinsam (HWG, e. V.) and other self-help groups. Madonna e. V supports prostitutes when leaving, and arranges re-training.

For callboys, there is the Berlin Initiative querstrich and the Arbeitskreis der Stricherprojekte in Deutschland (Working Group of the hustlers projects in Germany).

== Criticism ==
Most of the criticism of Hydra's work is based on a fundamental rejection of prostitution as a recognized profession. It is criticized that Hydra plays down, and promotes, prostitution, which could, for example, hinder the protection of minors. In addition, it has been said that Hydra is primarily committed to the interests of brothel owners. Furthermore, it is argued that the recognition of prostitution leads to an increase in the area of forced prostitution.

As an interest representation, the association takes a positive position on prostitution. The feminist magazine Emma criticizes Hydra, in that it does not represent the real interests of prostitutes, since, according to their information, a maximum of 0.01% of prostitutes are organized, and the association represents only a part of the industry. Hydra disagreed that prostitution for women is a perverse involuntary sex business. In an open letter, the association claimed that Alice Schwarzer's idea of communication between "customer" and "service provider" was an "absolute caricature".

== See also ==
- List of sex worker organizations
- Prostitution in Germany
