= African Sex Workers Alliance =

Pan African alliance of sex worker led groups

African Sex Workers Alliance (ASWA) is a pan African alliance of sex worker led groups which aims to improve the health and human rights of female, male, and transgender sex workers. ASWA was formed in 2009 and is based in Nairobi, Kenya. Member organisations exist in many African countries.

== Details ==
African Sex Workers Alliance (ASWA) was formed in February 2009 at an African sex worker conference in Johannesburg. It is based in Nairobi, Kenya.

Member organisations exist in Nigeria (led by Patoo Abraham), Namibia, Kenya, Botswana, Mozambique, South Africa, Uganda, Zimbabwe, Burundi, Democratic Republic of the Congo, Mali, Ghana, Cameroon, Côte d'Ivoire, Zambia, Tanzania, Rwanda, Zanzibar, Cameroon, Malawi, and Ethiopia.

The coalition of groups addresses issues of "decriminalisation of sex work; strengthening sex worker-led leadership and organising; ensuring sex work is accepted as work; human and civil rights; access to HIV treatment and other health services; the high incidence of violence experienced by sex workers including from law enforcement officers; and ensuring the inclusion of male and transgender sex workers."

In 2011, African Sex Workers Alliance documented human rights violations of sex workers in Kenya, Uganda, South Africa, and Zimbabwe. In 2015 it organised activities for International Day to End Violence Against Sex Workers, 17 December, which included a procession in Nairobi.

As of March 2018 Denis Nzioka was Programmes Manager at African Sex Workers Alliance for Kenya.

== See also ==
- Sex work
- Sex workers' rights
- Global Network of Sex Work Projects (NSWP)
- World Charter for Prostitutes' Rights
