= Meg Muñoz =

Advocate for sex workers

Meg Muñoz is an ally and advocate for sex workers. She is a former sex worker who founded Abeni, a nonprofit organization which seeks to support those who work in the sex/adult entertainment industry.

== Early life ==
Meg Vallee Muñoz is from Orange County, California. Her childhood was uneasy, and she experienced issues with substance abuse and eating disorders early on.

== Sex work ==
At eighteen, Muñoz began to work as an escort as a way to support herself in a financially independent way while attending post-secondary. Initially, Muñoz found the experience to be adventurous. While she admitted that some clients were intimidating, on the whole her experience was a positive one. However, a friend introduced her to methamphetamine, and addiction soon overtook her. After working as an escort for around two years, Muñoz dropped out of the lifestyle, and out of school, due to drug addiction. The next few years were tumultuous for Muñoz, which included an attempt in rehabilitation and multiple abortions, as well as an encounter with Christianity.

By her mid-twenties, Muñoz decided to return to college, and to sex work. Once again she worked as an escort, an experience which not only provided her with her basic needs, but was a source of stability in an otherwise-fragile time. She supported herself financially, and for the most part, enjoyed her experience as a sex worker. However, Muñoz was caught in an abusive relationship with her then-boyfriend, as well as an abusive relationship with a friend with whom she abused drugs; it was a relationship she described as "possessive, co-dependent, and controlling". Two years after her return to sex work, Muñoz's friend began to blackmail her, threatening to tell her family about her drug abuse and her sex work if she did not pay for his silence. This abuse continued for three years, culminating in what Muñoz described as a "violent beating and sexual assault."

After three years of being trafficked and blackmailed by her acquaintance, Muñoz was able to reconnect with someone who had been a source of security previously. This man later became her husband, and the father of their children. Muñoz left the sex industry and attempted to focus on moving on. However, she struggled from posttraumatic stress disorder from the trafficking trauma, and suffered from deep shame as a result of the social stigma surrounding sex workers - including those who began in the industry willingly, as she did. Activism, as well as a developing belief in Christianity, aided Muñoz in taking proper steps toward recovery: In 2009, she started her nonprofit organization, Abeni.

=== Post-sex work activism ===
After leaving the sex industry, and due to the success of Abeni, Muñoz has been an outspoken activist in the struggle for the rights of sex workers. Primarily, she stresses the representation of sex workers by sex workers, and the importance of all sex workers to have a safe space in which they can avoid the social stigma that comes from being a sex worker. She supports the decriminalization of sex work to benefit the safety of sex workers and survivors of trafficking. She is critical of organizations and propaganda that seeks to paint all sex work as human trafficking: “It’s great PR for organizations and law enforcement, but I have yet to see that translate into solid, long lasting, consistent, relevant, holistic support and care that helps those who need it the most.” Muñoz is an avid user of Twitter, and continues to Tweet her experiences and views surrounding sex work.

== Abeni ==
Abeni exists to create a safe, confidential place for those working in the Orange County sex trades, as well as those being domestically sex trafficked.

— Abeni mission statement

Muñoz initially began Abeni in 2009 as a nonprofit organization aimed at survivors of sex trafficking, as Muñoz herself had been trafficked toward the end of her time as a sex worker. However, Muñoz was dissatisfied with this status, and briefly shut down Abeni while considering how best to reshape the organisation. When Abeni reopened, it was not only support for survivors of trafficking, but a resource and support system for sex workers who are in the business willingly and enjoy their work. Despite their satisfaction, the stigma surrounding sex work can be isolating, and Abeni offers sex workers a chance to have a secure support system. Unlike rescue industries, Abeni does not aim to provide an exit strategy to all who engage in sex work, instead offering a safe place for sex workers who enjoy their work but wish to avoid the social stigma. However, they still provide support for those who are survivors of trafficking and wish to leave the industry. Those who work with Abeni often have experience in the sex industry, and part of Abeni's philosophy is to address the misconceptions surrounding sex workers and the industry. Other services include:

From Abeni's website:

- Sex work support
- Sex work safety (harm reduction)
- One-on-one life coaching/relational support
- Holistic, relevant resources geared toward whole-person care
- Individualized short/long term goal setting and management
- Sex trafficking support/aftercare assistance
- Exit strategy development

— Abeni's list of services

Abeni is a supporter of the Orange County Needle Exchange Program, a nonprofit needle-exchange program in Orange County, California, that seeks to provide clean needles and HIV testing to those in need, as well as other services. Abeni also supports other sex workers' rights organizations, and provided donations of lube and advice to the Pacific Northwest outreach program STROLL.

=== Religious experience ===
Muñoz's first encounter with religion occurred in her early twenties, after she left her initial bout with sex work. She described her next life-changing experience with Christianity as when she was at the end of her abusive relationship with her friend-turned-trafficker, when she was reminded of her "safe place" with the man who would become her husband. After she married, she began to devote much of her time and focus into Christianity, but found that it made her feel like an outsider as she had not yet come to grips with her past. However, she does attribute the start of her healing process to faith. Muñoz eventually found her own path to faith after leaving her church, which aided in the creation of Abeni; in turn, Abeni helped solidify her faith. Even though Muñoz herself has faith, and Abeni is supported by EPIC Church, she makes a point of not pushing religion onto sex workers who come to Abeni for support.

== Quotes ==
- "Without understanding where people have been or what their needs are, you cannot truly support our agenda."
- "I’m done with bad research studies. Poorly conducted, bias, limited research needs to stop being used as the foundation for fundraising, education, and awareness. The damage that’s being done is immeasurable and harmful for entertainers, sex workers, and trafficking survivors alike."
- "But one day, after another round of begging God to help me figure out what was wrong and take it all away, I got an answer that I wasn’t expecting. Very clearly, I felt him say “I can’t heal what you won’t acknowledge.” And it changed everything for me. That very day, the shame lifted completely and I experienced a freedom that I'd never felt before. I started to realize I'd been wearing someone else's shame."
