= Grisélidis Réal =

Swiss writer and prostitute

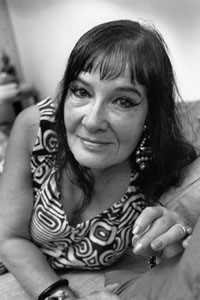
- Réal in 1998 by Erling Mandelmann
- Born: 11 August 1929; Lausanne, Switzerland
- Died: 31 May 2005 (aged 75); Geneva, Switzerland
- Occupations: Prostitute, activist, writer
- Known for: Co-founder of Aspasie

Grisélidis Réal (11 August 1929 – 31 May 2005) was a writer and sex worker from Geneva, Switzerland.

== Life and sex work ==
She was born in Lausanne, in a family of teachers and spent her childhood in Alexandria, and then in Athens, where her father was working. Back in Switzerland, she studied art in Zürich. She started working as a sex worker at the beginning of the sixties. She lived in Germany, with her children (she had four) and her lover.

Réal retired from sex work in 1995, at the age of 66. She died of cancer in Geneva in 2005. On 9 March 2009 her grave was transferred to the Cimetière des Rois in the Plainpalais district, the prestigious Geneva cemetery where Ernest Ansermet, John Calvin, Jorge Luis Borges, Alberto Ginastera, Frank Martin, Jean Piaget and Alice Rivaz are buried.

== Activism related to prostitution ==
In her first book, Le noir est une couleur (Black is a color – Balland, 1974, ISBN 2-7158-0005-3), she told her story in a blunt and honest way, with a dark lyrical tone she got from her own experience.

During the seventies, Réal became an activist for sex workers, in particular, in 1973, with the occupation of the Church of Saint-Bernard de la Chapelle, in Paris. Réal rejected the argument of the alienation by the pimps, and stated that prostitution could be a choice, a free-will decision. The revolutionary whore was born. She helped in the creation of a support association (Aspasie) for prostitutes. In her tiny home in Geneva, she created an international documentation center about prostitution. In 1992, she published La Passe imaginaire (L'Aire/Manya, ISBN 2-87896-037-8), a compilation of letters sent to her friend Jean-Luc Hennig.

In parallel to her political fight, Réal developed a positive vision of what she called in January 2005, "an Art, a Humanism and a Science".

== Belle de Nuit ==
On 15 February 2017 a biopic film about Réal was released. The film was directed by Marie-Eve de Grave and includes footage of de Grave's interview with Réal shortly before her death.

== Publications ==
- Le noir est une couleur, Paris, Éditions Balland, 1974; Lausanne, Éditions d'en bas, 1989; Paris, Éditions Verticales, 2005.
- La Passe imaginaire, Vevey, Éditions de l'Aire/Manya, 1992; Paris, Verticales, 2006.
- À feu et à sang, recueil de poèmes écrits entre mai 2002 et août 2003, Genève, Éditions Le Chariot 2003
- Carnet de bal d'une courtisane, Paris, Verticales, 2005.
- Les Sphinx, Paris, Verticales, 2006.
- Le carnet de Griselidis, paroles de Grisélidis Réal et Pierre Philippe, musique de Thierry Matioszek et Alain Bashung, chanson interprétée par Jean *Guidoni sur l'album « Putains », 1985.
- Suis-je encore vivante? Journal de prison, Paris, Verticales, 2008.
- Mémoires de l'inachevé (1954-1993), textes réunis et présentés par Yves Pagès, Paris, Verticales, 2011.

== Bibliography ==
- Jean-Luc Hennig, Grisélidis, courtisane, Paris, Albin Michel, 1981; réédition, Éditions Verticales, 2011
- Philippe Renaud, Péripépathétiquement vôtre, In : Écriture, Lausanne, 47, 1996, p. 103–126, réédité dans Sept Histoires à rebrousse-poil, Vevey, éditions de l'Aire, 2013, pp. 57–84.
- (imaginé par Gérard Laniez), Grisélidis Réal, La Nuit Écarlate ou Le Repas des Fauves, association Himéros, 2006
- Jean Guidoni, Le carnet de Grisélidis, Chanson de Pierre Philippe, album Putains..., Universal, 1985
