= Global Network of Sex Work Projects =

Not-for-profit organisation

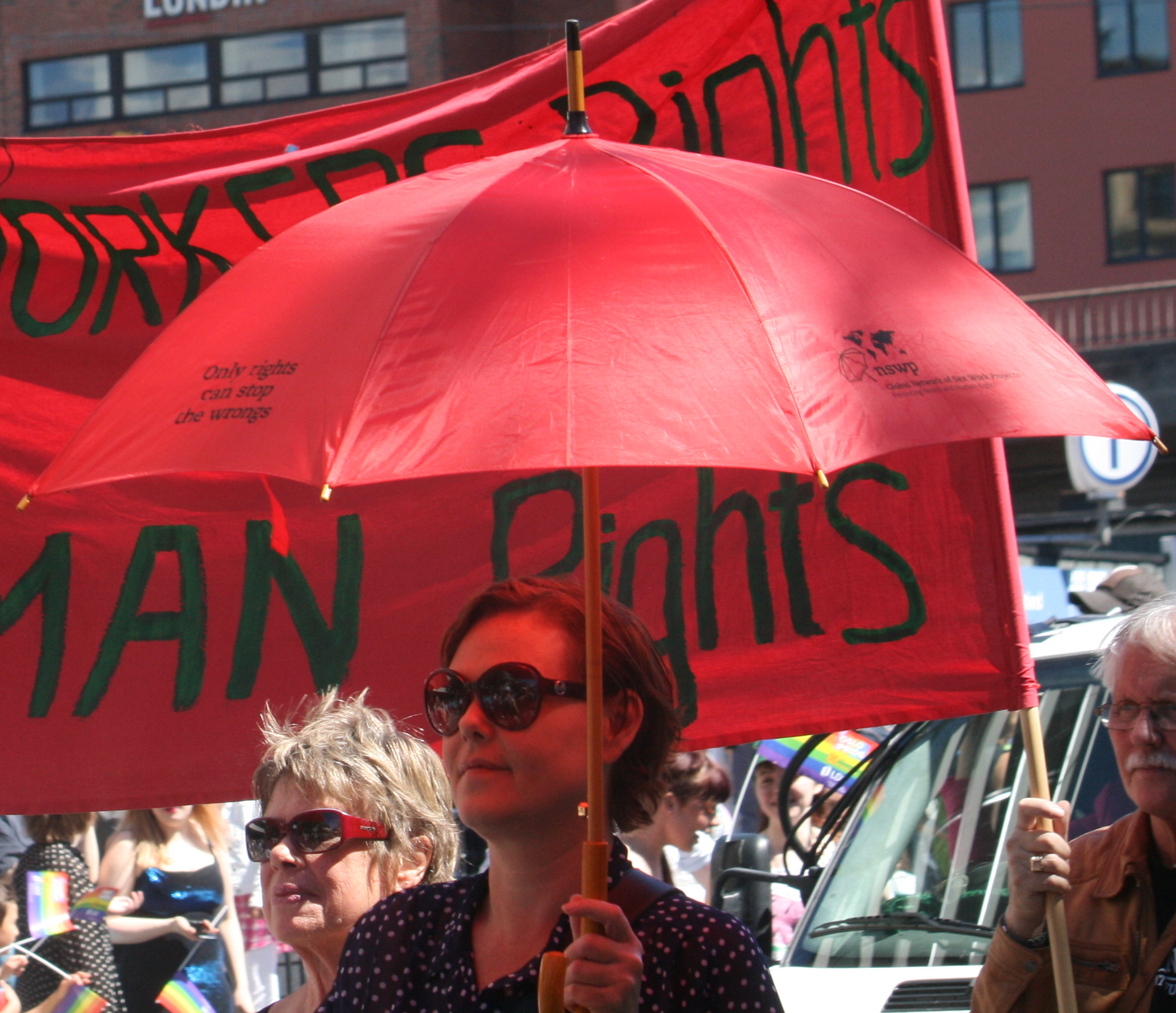
A woman carrying a NSWP red umbrella in 2015

Global Network of Sex Work Projects (NSWP) is an organisation that advocates for the health and human rights of sex workers. It is a private not-for-profit limited company, based in Edinburgh, Scotland, and founded in November 1990. NSWP is a membership organisation, with members from five regions (Africa, Asia Pacific, Europe, Latin America, North America, and the Caribbean). NSWP publishes resources, including briefing papers, policy briefs, community guides, global and regional reports, smart guides, statements, the Research for Sex Work Journal, and case studies. It supports the decriminalization of sex work.

NSWP advocates for sex worker representation at international policy forums. It "credits itself as largely responsible for sex work replacing prostitution as the go-to terminology for institutions such as the Joint United Nations Programme on HIV/AIDS (UNAIDS) and the World Health Organization (WHO)."

== Manifesto ==
NSWP's website states:

NSWP amplifies the voices of sex worker-led organisations advocating for rights-based services, freedom from abuse and discrimination, freedom from punitive laws, policies, and practices, and self-determination for sex workers. NSWP works primarily with sex worker-led regional networks, and facilitates sex worker-led capacity building.

== History ==
Global Network of Sex Work Projects was founded in November 1990, at the 2nd International Conference for NGOs working on AIDS, and was registered in the UK in 2008.

In 2008, it received $60,000 in grant funding from Open Society Foundations.

In 2009, it was appointed co-chair of the Joint United Nations Programme on HIV/AIDS (UNAIDS) "Advisory Group on HIV and Sex Work", established to "review and participate in the development of UNAIDS policy, programme or advocacy documents, or statements".

In 2025, the NSWP was designated as an undesirable organization in Russia.

== Publications ==
=== NSWP consensus statement ===
In 2013, NSWP released a consensus statement on sex work, human rights, and the law which details eight essential activism goals of sex work-related advocacy groups. They include the right to:

- Associate and organise;
- Be protected by the law;
- Be free from violence;
- Be free from discrimination;
- Privacy and freedom from arbitrary interference;
- Health;
- Move and migrate; and
- Work and free choice of employment

=== Research for Sex Work journal ===
- Research for Sex Work 8: Sex Work and Law Enforcement. Edinburgh: NSWP, 2005.
- Research for Sex Work 9: Sex Work and Money. Edinburgh: NSWP, 2006.
- Research for Sex Work 10: Sex Workers’ Rights. Issue 10. Edinburgh: NSWP, 2008.
- Research for Sex Work 11: Sex Work and Pleasure. Edinburgh: NSWP, 2009.
- Research for Sex Work 12: Sex Work and Violence. Edinburgh: NSWP, 2010.
- Research for Sex Work 13: HIV and Sex Work. Edinburgh: NSWP, 2013.
- Research for Sex Work 14: Sex Work is Work. Edinburgh: NSWP, 2015.
- Research for Sex Work 15: Resistance and Resilience. Edinburgh: NSWP, 2016.

=== Contributions to publications ===
- Prevention and treatment of HIV and other sexually transmitted infections for sex workers in low- and middle-income countries: recommendations for a public health approach. Geneva: World Health Organization, United Nations Population Fund, UNAIDS, NSWP, 2012.

== Controversy ==
In 2015, former NSWP vice president Alejandra Gil was convicted by a Mexico City court and sentenced to 15 years in prison for human trafficking.

== See also ==
- African Sex Workers Alliance (ASWA)
- International Day to End Violence Against Sex Workers
- List of sex worker organizations
- UK Network of Sex Work Projects (UKNSWP)
- World Charter for Prostitutes' Rights
