= TAMPEP =

European sex worker advocacy organisation

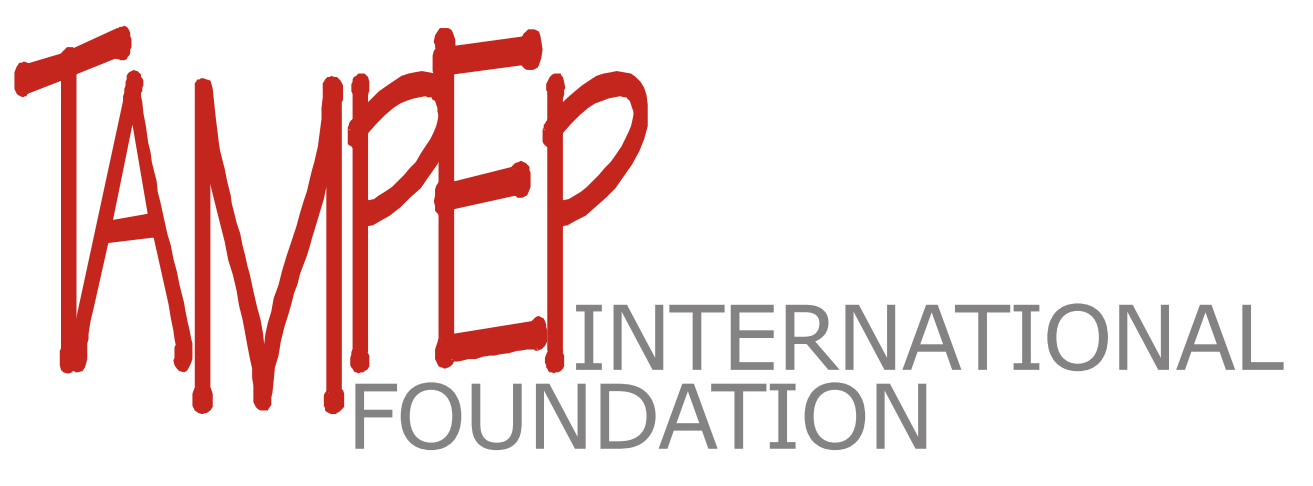
- A TAMPEP logo used in 2015
- Formation: 1993; 33 years ago
- Type: NGO
- Legal status: foundation
- Purpose: health and human rights of migrant sex workers
- Headquarters: Amsterdam, Netherlands
- Region served: Europe
- General Coordinator: Licia Brussa
- Website: www.tampep.eu

TAMPEP (European Network for the Promotion of Rights and Health among Migrant Sex Workers) is an international organisation that supports the health and human rights of migrant sex workers in Europe.

== History ==
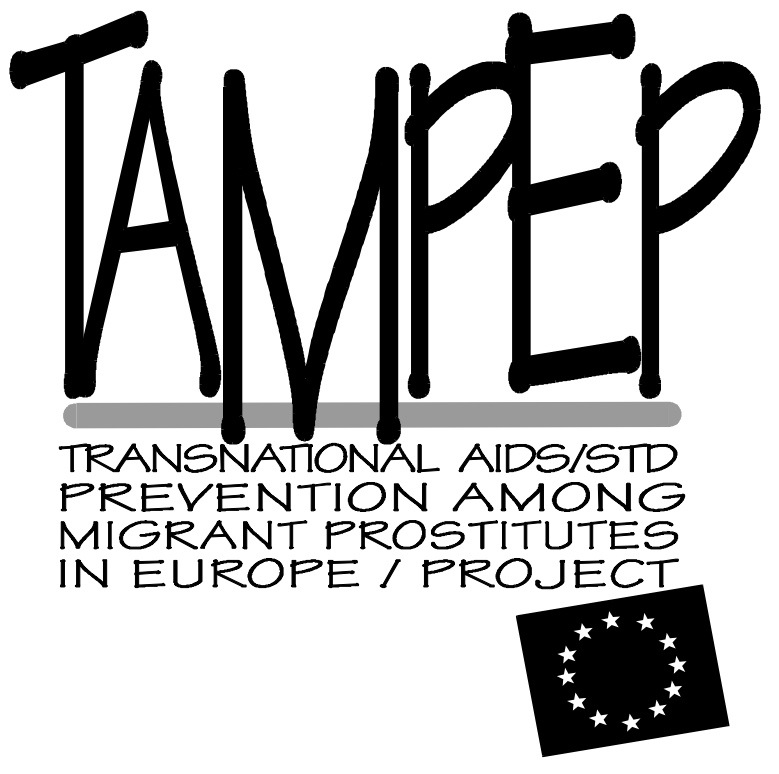
Old TAMPEP logo used around 2004

Founded in 1993, with headquarters in Amsterdam, the organisation initially operated in Italy, Austria, Germany, and the Netherlands. As of November 2019, it coordinates a network of 30 organisations, in 25 countries of Europe, and receives funding from the European Commission, as well as from national governments, and was said to reach persons from over 80 different nationalities, as of January 2018. As of November 2019, TAMPEP is hosted by Pro-tukipiste, a service provider organisation based in Helsinki, Finland.

TAMPEP originally stood for "Transnational AIDS/STD prevention amongst Migrant Prostitutes in Europe Project"; "STD" was later changed to "STI". The organisation has changed its self-description several times over the years: By 2004, it presented itself as the "European Network for Transnational AIDS/STD Prevention among Migrant Prostitutes"; as of 2019, it calls itself the "European Network for HIV/STI Prevention and Health Promotion among Migrant Sex Workers".

TAMPEP states that in 2017, it was re-structured into a "migrant sex worker-led network that unites sex worker groups and allies in the fields of sex work, migration, and health. The purpose of the network is to build stronger partnerships, and to advocate for the rights and health of migrant and mobile sex workers at the European level".

== Activities ==
The main concern of the project is HIV/AIDS prevention; it approaches the problem from a general health and human rights approach, working for empowerment and self-determination of female and transsexual migrant sex workers, and for improvements in their working conditions and social situation. The member organisations employ street work, peer educators, and informational materials to contact migrant sex workers. The organisation produces regular reports about the situation of sex workers in Europe.

TAMPEP's literature emphasises the need to cleanly distinguish between the issues of trafficking, sex work, and migration. TAMPEP opposes trafficking as a human rights abuse, but supports efforts to improve working conditions of sex workers and to facilitate migration.

TAMPEP has also operated in Nigeria, where it helps to rehabilitate sex workers deported from Italy.

== See also ==
- Istanbul Convention
- List of sex worker organizations
- Sexual and reproductive health and rights
- Sexual consent
- Sex workers' rights
- The Red Thread (De Rode Draad)
