= Patoo Abraham =

Nigerian prostitute and sex workers' rights activist

- Born: Patoo Abraham; 1966 (age 59–60)
- Citizenship: Nigeria
- Occupation: Sex Worker Activist

Patoo Abraham (born 1966) is a Nigerian prostitute and sex workers' rights activist advocating for the legalization of sex work profession in Nigeria and the decriminalization of women in prostitution. As of 2014 she is leader of the African Sex Workers Alliance (ASWA) in Nigeria. She is also the President of Women of Power Initiative (WOPI), an NGO formed for the purpose of improving sex work in Nigeria. She has staged series of protests on the streets of Lagos against the abuse and disregard faced by sex workers.

== Activism ==
Abraham was involved as a member and leader of two activist organizations which advocate for the rights of sex workers and prostitutes in Africa: the Nigerian chapter of the African Sex Workers Alliance and the Women of Power Initiative.

In 2014, Abraham, as the leader of the Nigerian chapter of the African Sex Workers Alliance, led multiple protests advocating for the rights and protections of sex workers in Nigeria. Abraham’s goal as a leader of African Sex Workers Alliance was to make sure all African sex workers obtain equal rights and respect, just like any other profession or job would be subject to. In an interview during the Lagos street protests Abraham led, she stated how sex workers, such as herself, feel about their lack of rights and respect: “We are tired of dying in silence. We want to be able to practice our profession with pride like every other person. We want an end to name-calling and stigmatization.”

In addition to her leading of multiple street protests in Lagos, Abraham continued to advocate for the legalization of African sex workers’ professions through her involvement in the Nigerian chapter of the ASWA and Women of Power Initiative (WOPI). Abraham served as a leader and the president of the Women of Power Initiative. Women of Power Initiative was a non-governmental organization which aimed to support the profession of sex workers.

=== African Sex Workers Alliance (ASWA) ===
Abraham was the leader of the African Sex Workers Alliance’s Nigerian branch in 2014. The African Sex Workers Alliance (ASWA) is run by sex workers; their mission is to support sex workers rights, and to “advocate for and advance the health and human rights of female, male, and transgender sex workers." ASWA was first established in 2009, and fused together groups who desired to support sex worker rights. The groups who formed ASWA include a combination of sex workers, activists, and non-governmental organizations.

As a leader of the Nigerian branch of ASWA, Abraham helped aid the goal of speaking out for equality of African sex workers by, most notably and most recalled in news outlets, leading and participating in street protests such as in Lagos.

ASWA, the alliance that Abraham was a leader of, has six primary guiding principles which guide their work. The six lead values they follow are: Accountability and Transparency, Equality and Justice, Voice and Agency, Respect, Diversity and Inclusion, and Solidarity. Accountability and Transparency means that the ASWA does their best to make sure everything is truthful and presented to their members as accurately as possible. Equality and Justice relates to the way the ASWA strives to ensure all members are treated equally and with respect. The Voice and Agency principle is set in place to make sure members have the ability to interact with ASWA in ways that are meaningful to them. The respect principle means that the ASWA respects all sex workers, and one of their core values is to make this respect is extended and understood by all. Diversity and Inclusion has to do intersectionality, and combining with other movements who want to dismantle exclusion and mistreatment of individuals. Solidarity, the last value stated by the ASWA, aims to ensure and remind members that they are there to unite and to support one another as sex-workers and as activists. These six guidelines serve as a template for everything the ASWA does and stands for.

Abraham was a primary leader of ASWA, and during her time as a leader in the organization, a qualitative study of African sex workers and feminism was conducted by author Ntokozo Yingwana. In Yingwana’s qualitative research investigation, the ASWA was used as one of the two primary research groups being surveyed. Yingwana’s journal article was published in 2018, but the data was gathered during 2014 and 2015, which was during the time Abraham served as a leader of ASWA. The qualitative research study was published by Duke University Press, and was conducted in order to understand what it truly means to be an “African sex worker feminist." ASWA was open to engaging in this study since they hoped it would aid in the unity and agreement among feminists who may still be uncertain as to whether or not sex work is something they support or not. The qualitative research study used ASWA participants to describe what they individually felt described the meaning of the following terms: African, sex-worker, and feminist. Additionally, each participant expressed what those terms felt like in relation to themselves. Using ASWA as primary interview participants in the study, Yingwana was able to convey the lived-experiences of actual African sex-workers. Yingwana expressed that their research was conducted in order to showcase different social movements, and therefore strengthen the connection and unity of a variety of different fields of activism and social movements.

=== Lagos street protests ===
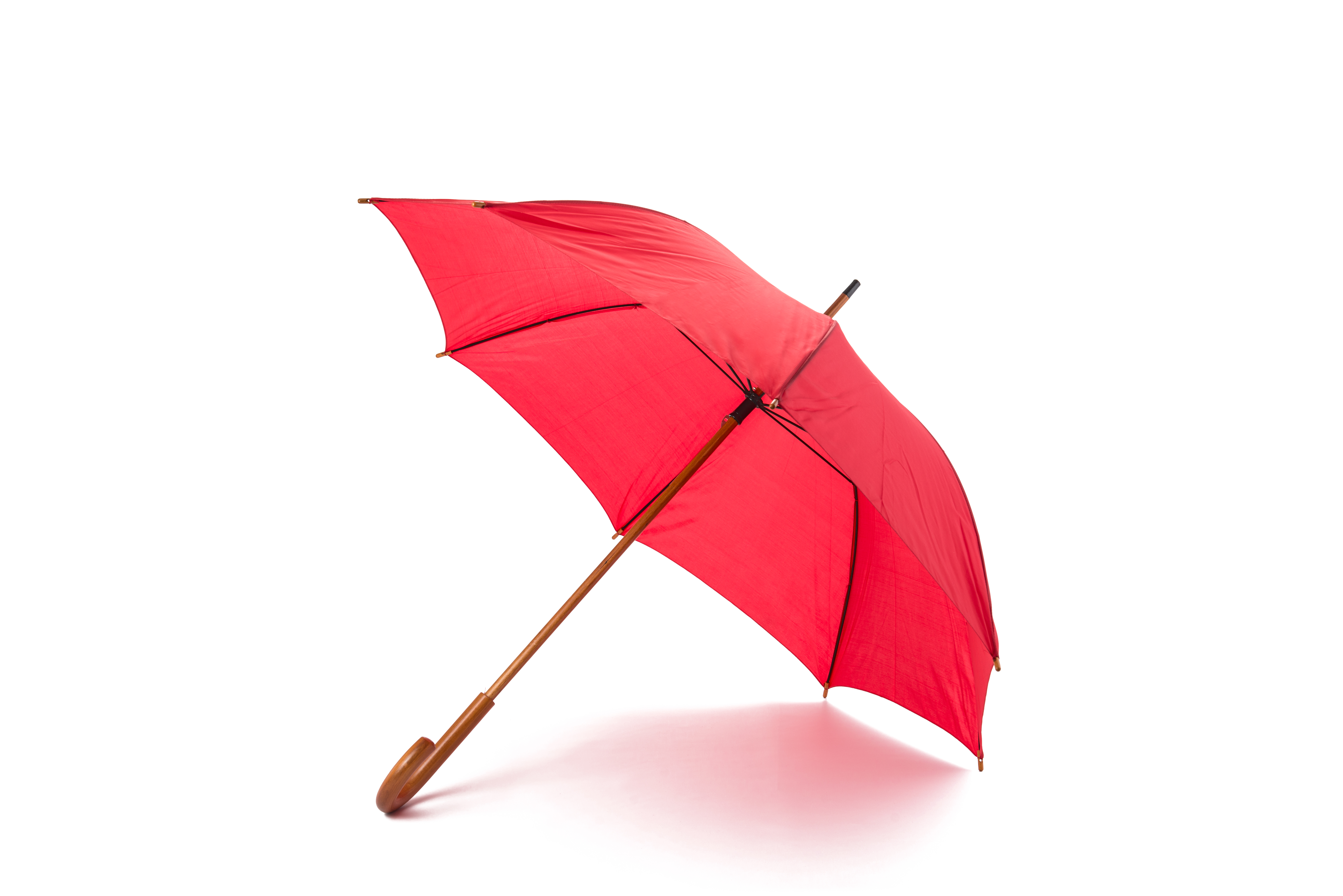
A red umbrella, which Abraham and other protesters carried, has been a symbol of ending violence against sex workers since first used in Italy in 2001

Abraham was the primary leader of the street protests in Lagos. With Abraham's leadership, protestors were able to use clothing as one of the primary forms of their protest. All the protestors wore t-shirts that were inscribed with the words, “Sex work is work, we need our rights.” Additionally, Abraham’s protesters were photographed carrying red umbrellas, as an homage to the Red Umbrella Project that sex workers in Italy demonstrated in response to inhumane and cruel conditions of sex workers. The red umbrella being symbolic of the sex worker’s refusal to accept discrimination and unfairness in their work was a central part of the visuals in Abraham’s street protests, and was documented by the news outlet, Aljazeera. The street protests were covered by a variety of different news outlets and sources based in Africa such as Aljazeera, Legit, and The Daily Post. Abraham is pictured at the front of the protest, leading the rest of the participants as they march for sex-workers’ rights. Even after Abraham’s leading of multiple Lagos street protests in 2014, The Nigerian Criminal Code still states that prostitution in Nigeria is an illegal activity.
