= Stroll pdx =

Sex workers' community outreach organization

STROLL (Sex Traders Radical Outreach & Liberation Lobby) is a community outreach organization that uses a harm reduction approach for grassroots community outreach with sex workers, focusing specifically on street outreach to low income or houseless workers, and community events for everyone that showcase sex workers' voices, art, music, and experiences. STROLL puts out the by-and-for sex worker magazine Working It, which has been written up in The Daily Dot and HuffPost.

STROLL has had fundraisers for workers sexually assaulted on the job, provided emergency grocery gift cards to sex workers who needed to take time off after being assaulted and robbed, held ongoing support groups (only one currently), and hosts a series of workshops on the legal and labor rights of sex workers with support from local Portland law firms Northwest Workers' Justice Project and Legal Aid. STROLL does monthly street outreach, outreach at a local meal night for street based sex workers, and by request is currently organizing workshops for the spring of 2018, for social service providers interested in learning more about the obstacles people in the sex industry face and what best practices are to support people in the sex industry.

Starting in the winter of 2018, STROLL is focusing on lobbying in the 2019 legislative session for protective legislation including: making it illegal for law enforcement to have sex with workers before arresting them; allowing workers to work together or share a space for safety reasons without being vulnerable to charges of trafficking or exploiting each other; and allowing full service sex workers to report assault without their jobs being used as evidence to prosecute them while their assaults are ignored.

STROLL was founded by Matilda Bickers, who was joined by sex worker advocate Becky Barryte and sex worker artist, writer, and activist Kat Salas in late 2016.
