= Suriname Men United =

Gay men's organization in Suriname

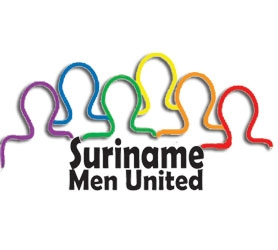
- Suriname Men United Logo, created in 2005
- Abbreviation: SMU
- Formation: November 1, 2005; 21 years ago
- Type: Non-governmental organization
- Purpose: To improve the well-being of men who have sex with men in Suriname
- Location: Suriname
- Website: Suriname Men United

Suriname Men United (SMU) is a non-governmental organization (NGO) established under national Surinamese law with the overall objective to improve the well-being of men who have sex with men (MSM) in Suriname. To realize its goal, SMU carries out a variety of activities in the areas of research, prevention, education, psychosocial care, and human rights advocacy.

To date, Suriname Men United is the largest MSM organization in Suriname. It serves the interests of the Surinamese MSM community at national, regional and international levels.

== History ==
On the first of November 2005, the NGO Suriname Men United was founded and it was launched on the first of December 2006, World AIDS Day. The idea to establish an organization focusing on the well-being of the Surinamese MSM community was born during a conference on Community Mobilization and Participatory Approaches to HIV/AIDS in Port of Spain, Trinidad & Tobago in 2002. At the conference, the founder of SMU became aware that in other Caribbean countries, MSM communities were facing similar discrimination and human rights issues as the Surinamese MSM community. However, because of the existence of MSM-focused organizations in other Caribbean countries, the issues were more recognized there. SMU was initiated as an organizations to give the MSM community a voice in Suriname. For the launching of SMU, the organization received assistance from the Caribbean Epidemiology Centre (CAREC), a regional public health institution based in Port of Spain.

== Activities ==
Research: In 2008 SMU conducted a needs assessment of Men who have sex with men (MSM) in Paramaribo, the capital of Suriname. The needs assessment was SMU's first large activity and provided baseline information for follow-up activities. One hundred MSM took part in the needs assessment of which seventy men were open about having sex with other men, while the remaining thirty were not. The needs assessment gave sufficient insight into the beliefs, behaviors and needs of men who are openly MSM or are having closeted sex with other men in Suriname. To illustrate one specific need, reference is made by the closeted respondents for a need for discreet health information for men who have sex with other men. In response to this need, Suriname Men United created a website providing relevant health information for the MSM community in Suriname.

Human rights: In November 2008, a Caribbean telecommunication company organized a free concert with two Jamaican Dancehall artists who are known for their homophobic and discriminatory song lyrics, in which they speak of promoting violence and hate against the MSM community and women. Suriname Men United, supported by domestic lawyers, the local LGBT community, the media, and the international network of LGBT organizations, confronted the company about the discriminatory nature of the lyrics of the booked artists. Based on Article 8(2) of the Surinamese Constitution, which prohibits discriminatory treatment on any ground, SMU demanded that the organizers of the concert guarantee that the performances of the two artists would respect the laws of Suriname. The fierce stance by SMU forced the telecommunication company to make public statements ensuring that no homophobic lyrics or statements would be presented at the concert, guarantees that the company complied with.

From 2010 on, the Coming Out Parade, an activity during the Surinamese Coming Out Week, has become an annual human rights activity of SMU. As a member of the LGBT platform, SMU has organized and taken part in National Coming Out Day and Coming Out Parade the last 3 years. The parade involves various national and regional LGBT organizations, allies of the LGBT community, and human rights activists.

Internationally, SMU is also active in the area of human rights. SMU represented the Surinamese LGBT Platform at the Universal Periodic Review session in Geneva in May 2011 and requested that the Surinamese government improve the protection of LGBT persons against discrimination.

On Human Rights Day (December 10, 2013), SMU developed and aired 10 human rights-themed infomercials. The infomercials feature representatives of the Surinamese society, such as athletes, parliamentarians, lawyers, LGBT youth, labor union representatives, people living with HIV, and other activists. The infomercial activity was funded by the Caribbean Vulnerable Community Coalition and inspired by the successful campaign "We are Jamaicans". The infomercials were aired on television and YouTube.

== Public views on homosexuality ==
The work of Suriname Men United is overwhelmingly well received and supported by the Surinamese society by large. Despite this general acceptance, SMU in its operations does receive some resistance from individuals and organizations based on personal or faith-based beliefs. For example, in July 2011, a member of parliament (MP) stated in parliament that homosexuality is an illness and needs to be eradicated and proposed that the government develop an anti-homosexual policy. In response to the actions and comments of the MP, the National LGBT platform was established to combine and strengthen the voices of the LGBT community and its allies against discriminatory attacks in general, including by MPs.

In October 2013, a fairly well known religious leader publicly opposed the decision of the Surinamese First Lady to hang out the rainbow flag during the Coming Out Week. The hanging of the flag was in support of the aim to create a society in which everyone, including LGBT individuals, can live up to their maximum potential. The religious leader claimed that accepting homosexual acts is equal to accepting thieving and pedophilic acts.

Although acceptance of MSM is steadily growing since the early 2000s, there are still recent acts of discrimination, unfair treatment in the workplace, and incidental acts of violence against MSM in Suriname.

== Partnerships ==
SMU is a board member of two national networks. One network is the LGBT Platform, which is focused on LGBT issues in the broadest sense. The board comes together for large projects for the LGBT community. Other Platform organizations are Women’S way Foundation, He+HIV and Proud2Be(a private Facebook group). The second national network of which SMU is also a partner is the Country Coordinating Mechanism, an implementation mechanism of the Global Fund, at country level. This network is health-focused, specifically on the national response to the HIV and AIDS epidemic in Suriname. SMU represents the Surinamese community of men who have sex with other men, a community that is considered at higher risk to contract in particular sexual transmitted diseases.

Regionally, SMU partners with the LGBTTTI Coalition of Latin America and the Caribbean. This coalition advocates for the recognition, respect and protection of human rights of LGBTTTI people: lesbians, gay men, bisexuals, transgender and transsexual people, and transvestites. The Coalition meets with the Organisation of American States, who work towards regional solidarity.

== Funding and programmatic support ==
SMU is largely funded and supported by bodies such as the Ministry of Health, Welfare and Sport (Netherlands) through Schorer, the Global Fund, Population Services International, and the National AIDS Program of Suriname.
