= SALLI =

Union of sex workers in Finland

SALLI - United Sex Professionals of Finland (Finnish: Seksialan Liitto SALLI, lit. 'Union of Sex Business') is a union of sex workers in Finland, founded on November 17, 2002. Its main aim is to solve the problems of the sex industry and to give out information about sexually transferred diseases.

The organization states that SALLI works for the human rights of sex workers; on its web site, the organization is described as more of a human rights organization than a workers' union.
