= Vila Mimosa =

Prostitution area in Rio de Janeiro, Brazil

Coordinates: 22°54′29.7″S 43°12′57″W

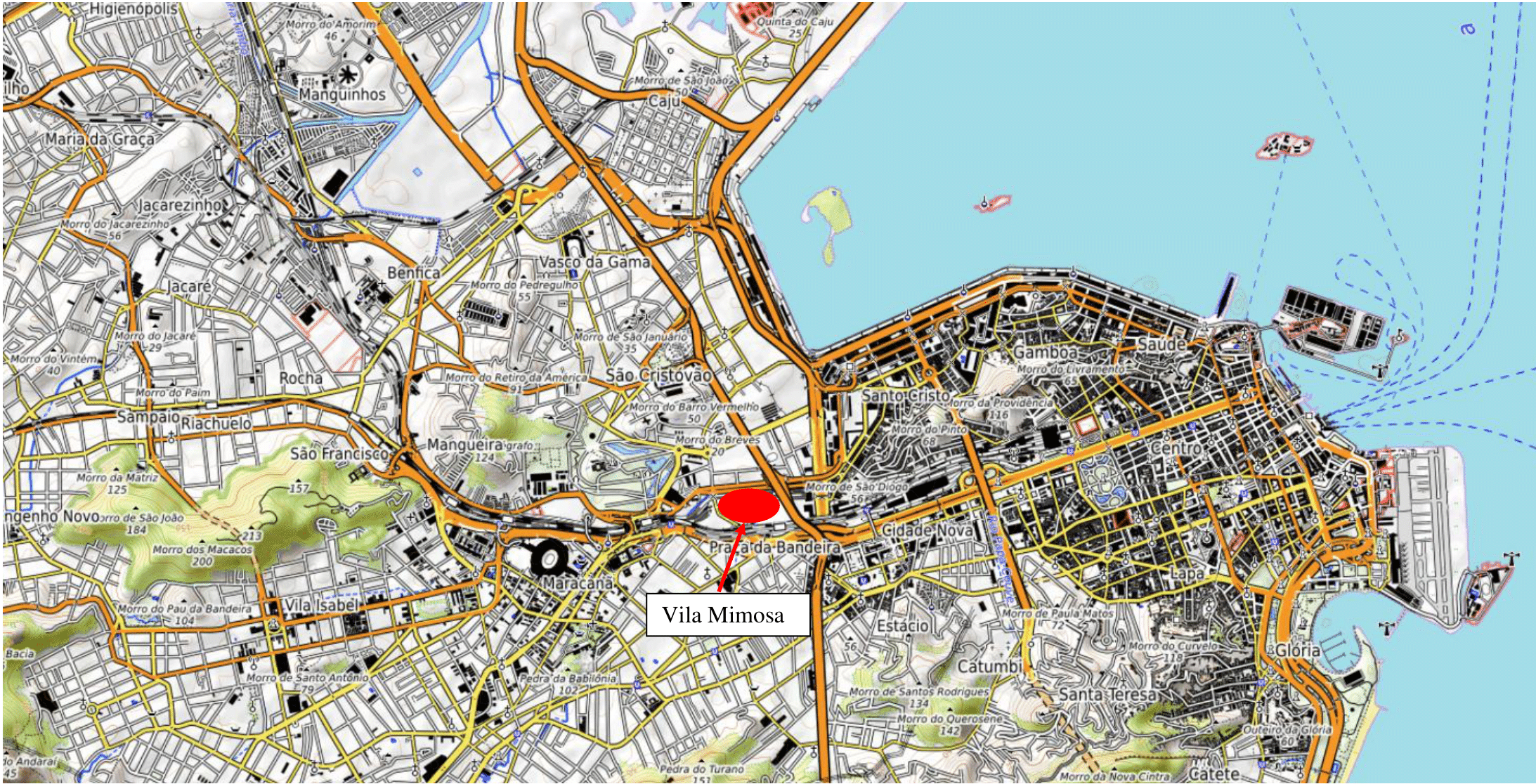
Map of Vila Mimosa's location in Rio de Janeiro

Vila Mimosa is the best-known area of prostitution in the city of Rio de Janeiro, Brazil. It is located on Rua Sotero dos Reis, in the Praça da Bandeira area, in the Zona Norte (North Zone) of the city. It was established in 1996, having moved from an area closer to the central area of the city.

== History ==
Prostitution in the central area of Rio de Janeiro dates back to the Empire of Brazil (1822–1889), when Polish and French women were imported to work in the Estácio neighbourhood, mainly to serve the upper classes. As the economy of the city declined with the end of slavery, prostitution underwent a transformation and the area began to cater mainly to working men.

Until the 1920s, the location of prostitution was not controlled in the centre of Rio de Janeiro. In that year, however, prostitutes were forced to operate in the Mangue (Mangrove) area, located near the Central and Leopoldina stations, as well as the nearby port. With the growth of the city, the number of prostitutes is said to have practically tripled between 1923 and 1929, to around three thousand. The area was not solely reserved for prostitution and in the 1930s and 1940s it also became a meeting place for artists, writers and musicians, such as Lasar Segall, Cartola, Luiz Gonzaga, and Manuel Bandeira. In 1943, as part of the construction of the Avenida Presidente Vargas, planned by the then president Getúlio Vargas, around 500 buildings in this area were demolished. From this time, increasing efforts were made to separate the red-light district from other activities, moving it into a smaller area away from the city centre.

In 1975, with the beginning of construction of the Rio de Janeiro Metro, there was new redevelopment. In 1977, further demolitions took place and prostitutes had to move again to make way for the Cidade Nova (new city), a middle- and working-class housing area. The area for prostitutes was reduced to a street in an existing location, then known as Vila Mimoza. However, the demolished areas lived on in the names given by the people to two government buildings built on the location, piranhão and cafetão (big whore and big pimp). Vila Mimoza was where the Rio de Janeiro Prostitutes Association was founded and where, in 1987, the First National Meeting of Prostitutes was organized by Gabriela Leite and Lourdes Barreto. Since then, Vila Mimosa has become synonymous with the struggle of sex workers in Brazil to achieve employment and other rights.

Prostitution finally came to an end in the Mangue area as the result of further urban redevelopment. With subsidies from the authorities, the prostitutes' association was able to purchase a warehouse in the Praça da Bandeira area at the beginning of 1996, approximately one kilometre to the west of the original Vila Mimosa, although the earlier plan had been to move them further north to the Gramacho area. The warehouse, of about 2500m2, was subdivided and bars and brothels were built in it. The front part was opened and faces the street. Houses close to the warehouse began to be sold by their owners and were developed with verandas that extended to the sidewalks, until Rua Sotero dos Reis became entirely dedicated to the sex trade. By 2018, there were approximately 78 brothels with an estimated 1500 prostitutes, although 4,000 were registered with the association. Ancillary traders and street vendors also moved in to supply clothing, food, and drinks. On Fridays and Saturdays, the street is closed to traffic. Almost all the brothels are open 24 hours a day. To ensure the security of the area, a plain-clothes security team is paid by the brothel owners.

== See also ==
- Prostitution in Brazil
