= List of golf courses in Portugal =

This is a list of golf courses in Portugal.

== South ==
All the golf courses situated in the south region of Portugal, close to Algarve region.

=== West Algarve ===
- Álamos Golf
- Alto Golf
- Amendoeira Golf Resort
  - Faldo Course
  - O'Connor Jnr. Course
- Boavista Golf
- Espiche Golf
- Morgado Golf
- Palmares Golf
  - Alvor (9 holes)
  - Praia (9 holes)
  - Lagos (9 holes)
- Parque da Floresta
- Penina Hotel & Golf Resort
  - Championship Course
  - Resort Course (9 holes)
- Gramacho
- Silves Golf
- Vale da Pinta
- Vale de Milho

=== Central Algarve ===
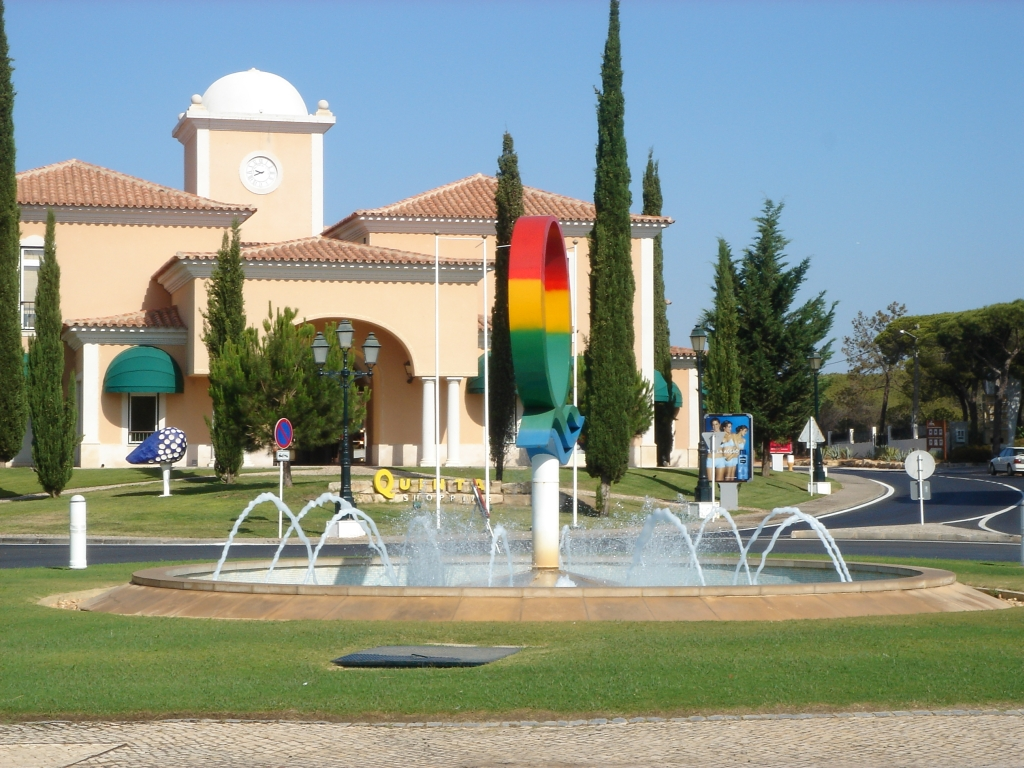
The front of the Quinta do Lago golf course.

- Balaia Golf Village
- Pine Cliffs Golf
- Pinheiros Altos
  - Pinheiros (Pines, 9 holes)
  - Sobreiros (Corks, 9 holes)
  - Oliveiras (Olives, 9 holes)
- Quinta do Lago
  - North Course
  - South Course
  - Laranjal Course
- Salgados Golf
- San Lorenzo Golf
- Vale do Lobo
  - Ocean Course
  - Royal Course
- Vila Sol
  - Prime (9 holes)
  - Challenge (9 holes)
  - Prestige (9 holes)
- Vilamoura
  - Laguna Golf Course
  - Millennium Golf Course
  - Vilamoura Old Course
  - Pinhal Golf Course
  - Victoria Golf Course

=== East Algarve ===
- Benamor Golf
- Castro Marim Golfe
  - Atlântico (9 holes)
  - Guadiana (9 holes)
  - Grouse (9 holes)
- Monte Rei Golf Club
- Quinta da Ria
- Quinta de Cima
- Quinta do Vale

== Centre ==
All the golf courses situated in the central region of Portugal, close to the capital, Lisbon.

- Aroeira Golf Resort
  - Aroeira I
  - Aroeira II
- Belas Clube de Campo
- Campo Real Lisboa
- Golden Eagle Golf
- Golfe do Estoril
- Golfe do Montado
- Golfe do Vimeiro
- Guardian Bom Sucesso Golf
- Lisbon Sports Club
- Marvão Golf
- Oitavos Dunes
- Praia d'El Rey
- Paço do Lumiar
- Penha Longa Golf Resort
  - Atlântico Championship
  - Atlântico Norte (Championship front 9 plus old Mosteiro 9)
  - Atlântico Sul (Championship back 9 plus old Mosteiro 9)
- Quinta da Beloura
- Quinta da Marinha
- Quinta do Perú
- Ribagolfe
  - Ribagolfe I
  - Ribagolfe II
- Royal Óbidos Spa & Golf Resort
- Santo Estevão
- Tróia Golf Resort
- West Cliffs Golf Course

== North ==
All the golf courses situated in the north region of Portugal, close to Porto.

- Club Golf Miramar
- Curia Golf Club
- Estela Golf Club
- Golfe de Amarante
- Montebelo Golfe
- Oporto Golf Club
- Ponte de Lima Golf
- Quinta da Barca
- Quinta do Fojo
- Vidago Palace Golf

== Azores ==
- Batalha Golf Club
- Furnas Golf Course
- Golfe da Ilha Terceira (Terceira Island Golf Course )

== Madeira ==
The 14th hole at Porto Santo Golfe

- Golfe Santo da Serra (Hosted the Madeira Island Open from 1993 to 2008 and 2012 to 2015 )
  - Machico (9 holes)
  - Desertas (9 holes)
  - Serras (9 holes)
- Palheiro Golfe
- Porto Santo Golfe (Hosts the Madeira Island Open from 2009 to 2011 )
