= Daspu =

Brazilian fashion brand that supports sex workers

Daspu is a Brazilian women's clothing brand aimed at prostitutes, launched on 16 December 2005 in Rio de Janeiro by the NGO Davida, which supports sex workers.

== Background ==
In 1992, Gabriela Leite, herself a prostitute, created the Davida NGO to attract the attention of the media and the political world to the issues faced by prostitution. However, the NGO lacked funds and creating a clothing brand specifically for the work of prostitutes was seen as a way of raising revenue.

== The name ==
One of the supporters of the NGO, the designer Sylvio de Oliveira, jokingly suggested the name Daspu, to poke fun at Daslu, a luxury brand from São Paulo that at the time was facing legal problems due to accusations of smuggling and fraud made against its owner Eliana Tranchesi. The name was a play on the Portuguese word for whore or prostitute, puta. However, this suggestion was not followed through at the time. The name only became established after it was published on 20 November 2005 in Elio Gaspari's column in the newspaper O Globo. Davida denied having provided this information to Gaspari and it seems that the source was someone who had overheard the conversation when it was first mentioned. After the column appeared a lawsuit was filed by Daslu but subsequently withdrawn when it became clear that media and public sympathies lay with Daspu.

== The company ==
The sudden fame forced the creation of the clothing company, which had until then been just an idea. The company, originally planned to be just a small business, developed similar techniques to other fashion houses, with regular collections and shows. It also diversified into selling other types of clothing. Its products began to be sold online and in stores in Rio de Janeiro and São Paulo known as putiques. From its launch in 2005 to 2009, the brand presented seven collections. Its most successful products were T-shirts, with humorous messages about citizenship, freedom, sexuality and the prevention of sexually transmitted infections and AIDS.

In 2006, Daspu had its application to participate in Rio Fashion Week rejected. It then organized a parallel show, featuring, for the first time, models who were not prostitutes, and attracted a larger audience than the official show, with the participation of models such as Gisele Bundchen. In 2009, it practically ceased its activities and in 2013 suffered a major blow when Leite died. However, in 2014 it presented a new collection that paid homage to Leite with a fashion show in Praça Tiradentes in Rio de Janeiro, with the presence of prostitutes from several states and as well as the actress Alexia Dechamps, who had played Leite in a show performed in Rio at the Centro Cultural Banco do Brasil in January 2012.

In 2021 Daspu took part in the production that opened the programme for the 110th anniversary of the Theatro Municipal de São Paulo and on 28 June 2022 prostitutes from several Brazilian states paraded at Circo Voador in Rio in what was referred to as the "latest in the history of Daspu".
