= Quinta do Lago =

Golf resort and residential estate in Algarve, Portugal

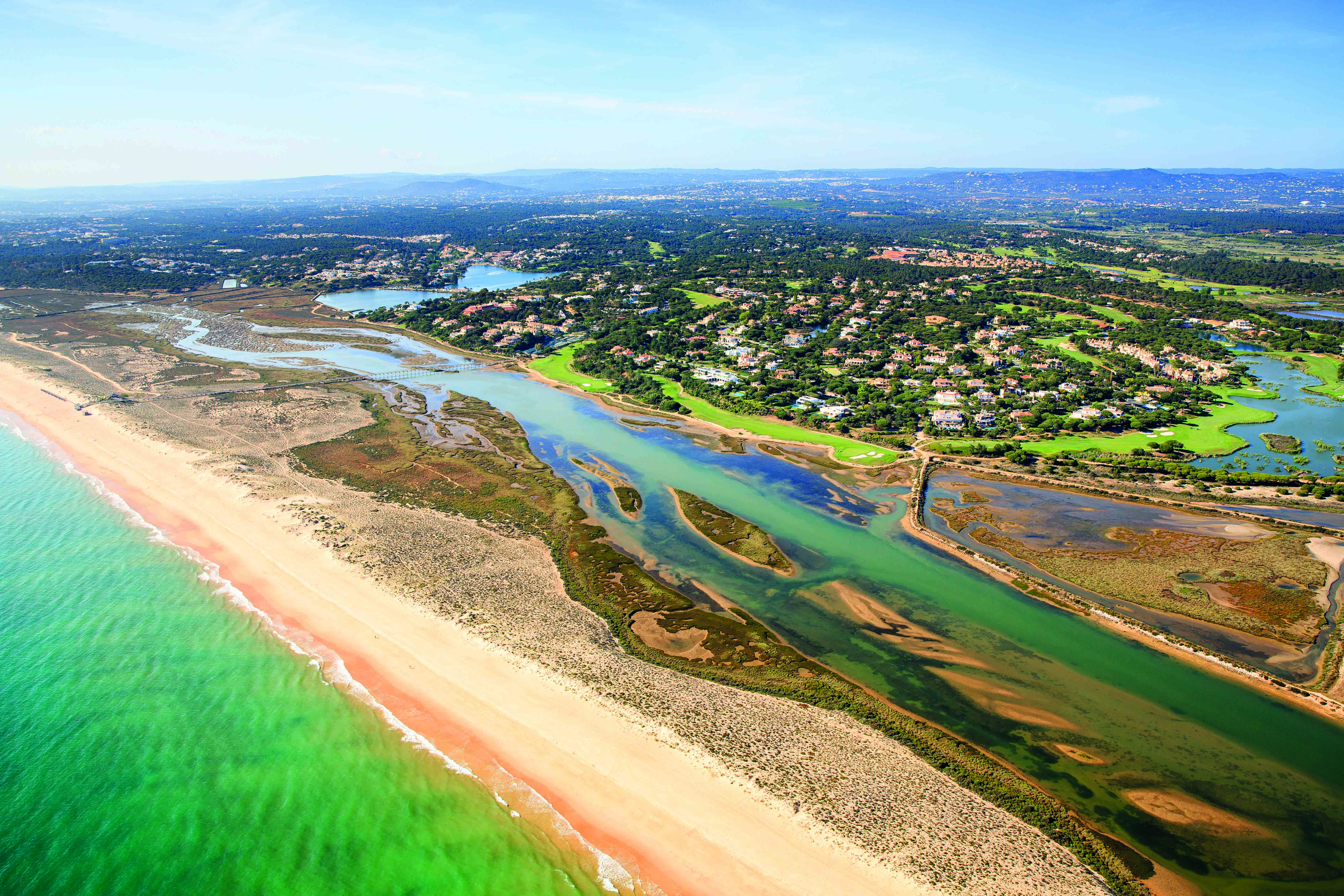
- An aerial view of the resort

- Location in Portugal
- 37.045°N 8.019°W

Club information
- Location: Algarve, Portugal
- Established: 1974; 50 years ago
- Type: Private
- Tota holes: 54
- Tournaments: Portuguese Open
- Website: www.quintadolago.com

North Course
- Designed by: Rocky Roquemore; William Mitchell; Joseph Lee
- Par: 72
- Length: 6,126 metres

South Course
- Designed by: William Mitchell
- Par: 72
- Length: 6,488 metres

Laranjal
- Designed by: Santana da Silva
- Par: 72
- Length: 6,480 metres

Quinta do Lago is a golf resort in Almancil, in the Algarve region of southern Portugal. Quinta do Lago comprises one of the three corners of the Golden Triangle of the Algarve's most affluent communities.

The community hosted the Portuguese Open, part of the PGA European Tour, in 1976, 1984–1986, 1988, 1989, 1990, and most recently in 2001.

== History ==
Quinta do Lago was founded in 1971 by Polish-Brazilian property developer André Jordan, three years after the end of Salazar's rule.

The original 550-hectare site, "Quinta dos Ramalhos" (Ramalhos Estate), contained the ruins of an old farmhouse (today "Casa Velha", having been rebuilt as a restaurant in 1972), a stone pine forest adjacent to both the Ria Formosa and the growing resort of Vale do Lobo which had been founded eight years earlier. Jordan's company, Planal, acquired the property on 20 December 1971. The Pinto de Magalhães family previously owned the large beach-lined estate for over 300 years. Within three years, a bridge to the beach had been built, the lake was created over the salt flats, and 27 holes of golf designed by architect William F. Mitchell had been completed.

Following the 1974 Carnation Revolution, Andre Jordan returned to Brazil, leaving the Portuguese state to manage. In 1974, revolutionary leader Otelo Saraiva de Carvalho presided over the golf courses' inauguration; in 1976, the Portuguese Open was held in Quinta do Lago for the first time.

In 1981, Portuguese politics stabilised, and Quinta do Lago management was returned to Planal, and Jordan returned to Portugal. The Portuguese Open was again held in Quinta do Lago in 1984–86. In 1986, the Four Seasons Country Club opened in the heart of Quinta, followed by the Four Seasons Fairways; neither resort is related to the Canadian Four Seasons Hotels and Resorts group.

In 1987, Jordan sold the resort (i.e. Planal, the holding company) to a consortium of British shareholders headed by Roger Abraham, a former banker at Chase Manhattan Bank, and food entrepreneur David Thompson. By 1989, Abraham had withdrawn, and Thompson headed the resort alone. The Portuguese Open was held in the resort again in 1988-90 and 2001.

In 1998, Planal was acquired by Irish billionaire Denis O'Brien.

== Golf courses ==
=== North Course ===
Quinta do Lago North Course (meters)
Tee	Rating/Slope	1	2	3	4	5	6	7	8	9	Out	10	11	12	13	14	15	16	17	18	In	Total
Black	M: 72.8 / 133	342	196	523	370	312	334	501	165	369	3112	345	473	372	405	155	376	140	317	445	3028	6140
Gold	M: 70.1 / 128 W: 76.1 / 136	321	166	500	349	290	300	482	139	320	2867	325	437	340	380	131	350	113	287	410	2773	5640
Silver	M: 66.0 / 119 W: 71.1 / 125	286	132	450	314	265	275	371	112	280	2485	230	381	306	343	122	321	80	258	347	2388	4873
Green	M: 64.6 / 116 W: 69.2 / 122	269	123	450	298	242	215	328	92	280	2297	230	381	280	306	88	290	80	258	347	2260	4557
Par		4	3	5	4	4	4	5	3	4	36	4	5	4	4	3	4	3	4	5	36	72
SI		15	11	9	1	5	13	7	17	3		12	10	4	6	16	2	18	14	8

=== South Course ===
Quinta do Lago South Course (meters)
Tee	Rating/Slope	1	2	3	4	5	6	7	8	9	Out	10	11	12	13	14	15	16	17	18	In	Total
Black	M: 73.6 / 138	368	500	387	171	500	348	175	363	355	3167	406	184	460	325	383	196	372	510	413	3249	6416
Gold	M: 71.0 / 133 W: 77.5 / 139	332	480	360	138	480	315	155	340	320	2920	375	151	425	285	350	160	322	490	370	2928	5848
Silver	M: 67.3 / 125 W: 72.9 / 129	307	415	285	113	435	290	127	307	285	2564	328	112	380	255	318	125	270	402	338	2528	5092
Green	M: 66.6 / 124 W: 72.0 / 128	307	415	285	105	435	249	127	307	285	2515	328	112	380	255	276	125	259	354	338	2427	4942
Par		4	5	4	3	5	4	3	4	4	36	4	3	5	4	4	3	4	5	4	36	72
SI		13	7	5	17	1	9	15	3	11		6	16	12	18	2	8	14	4	10

=== Laranjal Course ===
Quinta do Lago Laranjal Course (meters)
Tee	Rating/Slope	1	2	3	4	5	6	7	8	9	Out	10	11	12	13	14	15	16	17	18	In	Total
Black	M: 74.3 / 136	325	210	400	355	402	198	520	210	555	3175	395	335	195	455	390	520	231	333	448	3302	6477
Gold	M: 71.1 / 130 W: 77.3 / 142	300	170	375	325	376	174	471	162	492	2845	362	288	152	440	358	478	205	281	425	2989	5834
Silver	M: 67.1 / 122 W: 72.4 / 132	247	115	305	285	342	133	424	128	445	2424	325	245	111	393	295	428	147	235	374	2553	4977
Green	M: 65.8 / 119 W: 70.8 / 128	210	115	296	285	322	108	404	128	406	2274	300	245	111	370	268	428	117	235	351	2425	4699
Red		210	104	201	201	225	108	301	83	320	1753	222	200	111	282	206	326	117	235	292	1991	3744
Par		4	3	4	4	4	3	5	3	5	35	4	4	3	5	4	5	3	4	5	37	72
SI		15	11	5	9	3	17	1	13	7		6	18	10	16	4	8	2	14	12

== Gallery ==
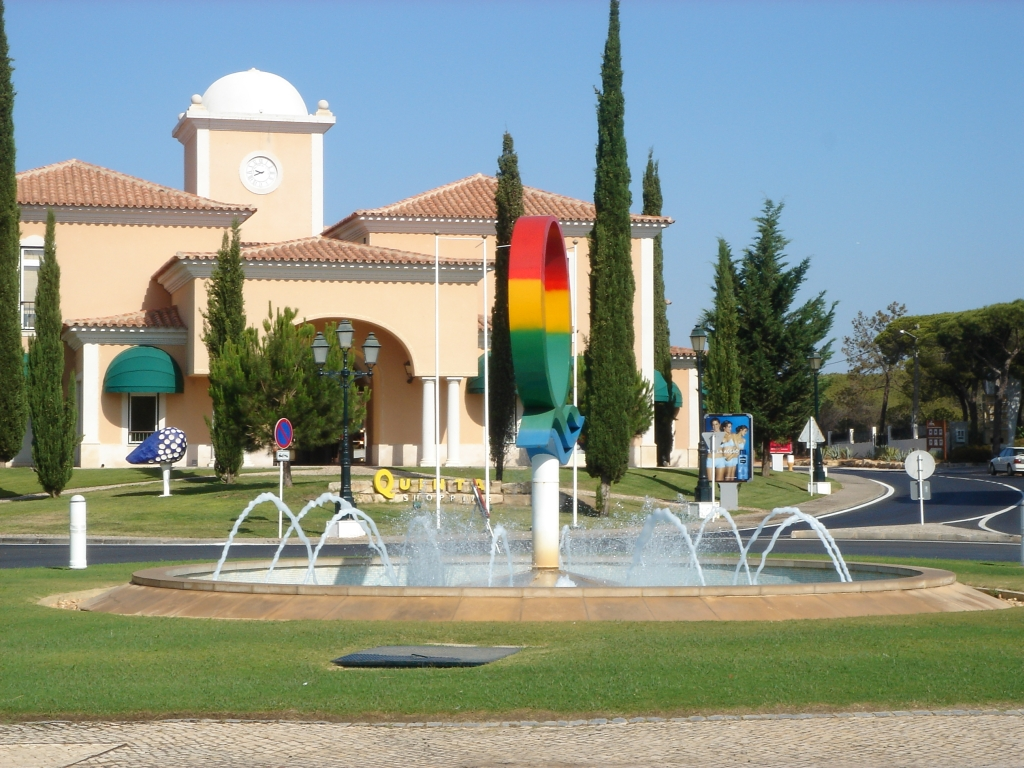
Quinta do Lago

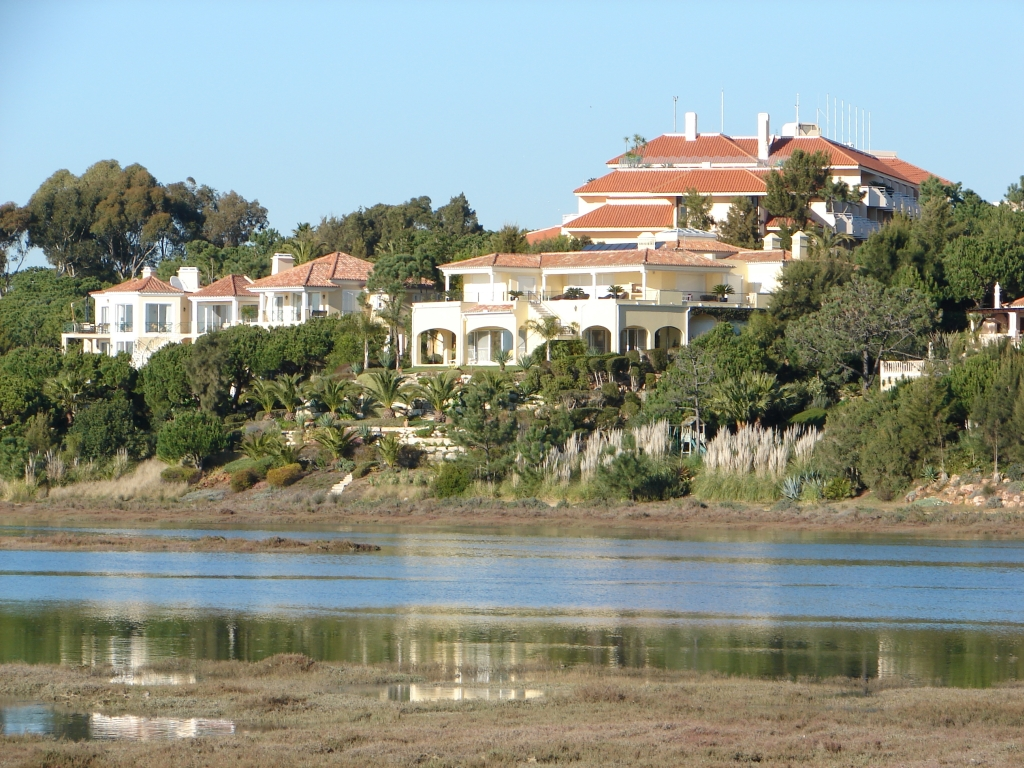
Quinta do Lago

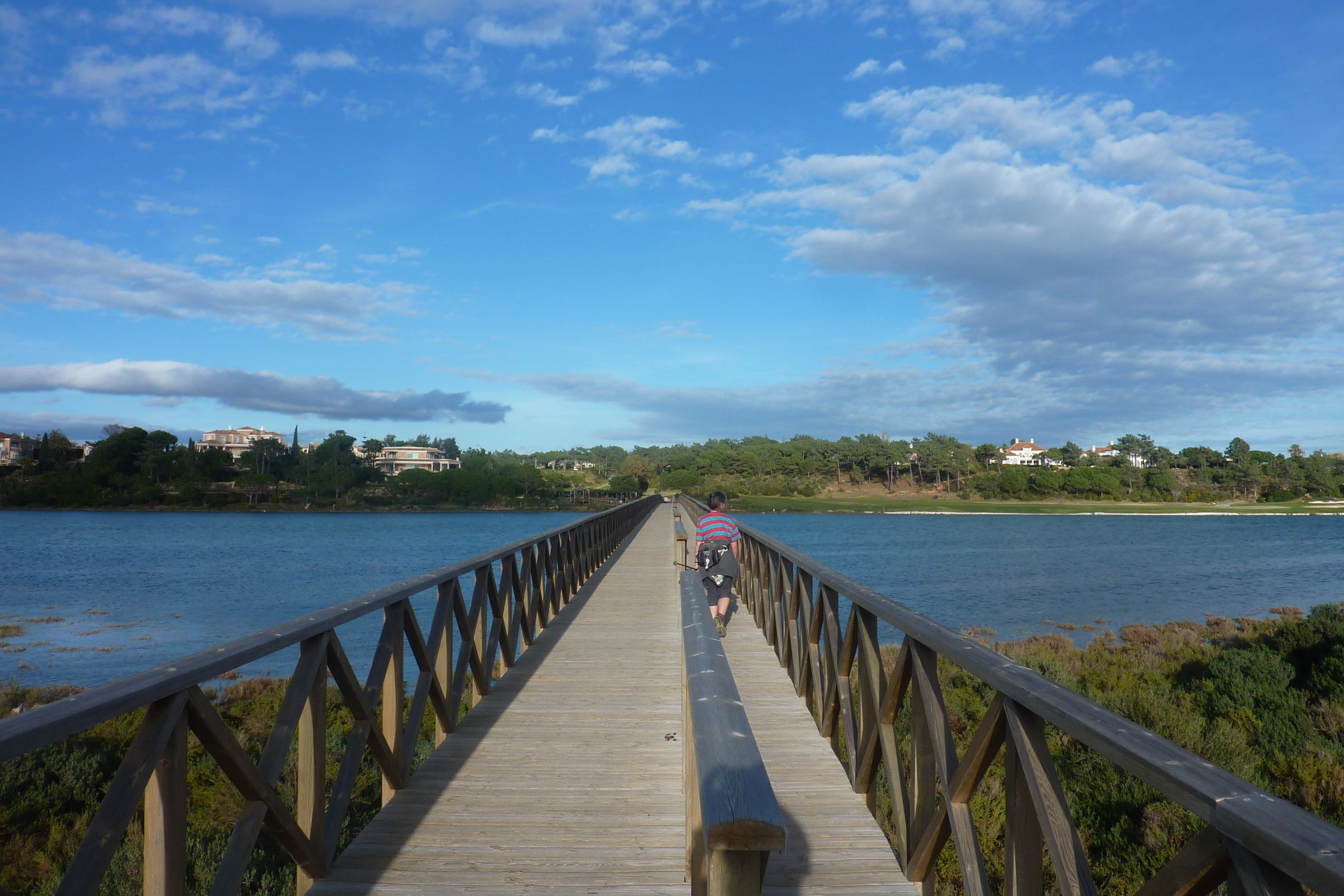
Bridge to the Praia da Qta. do Lago.

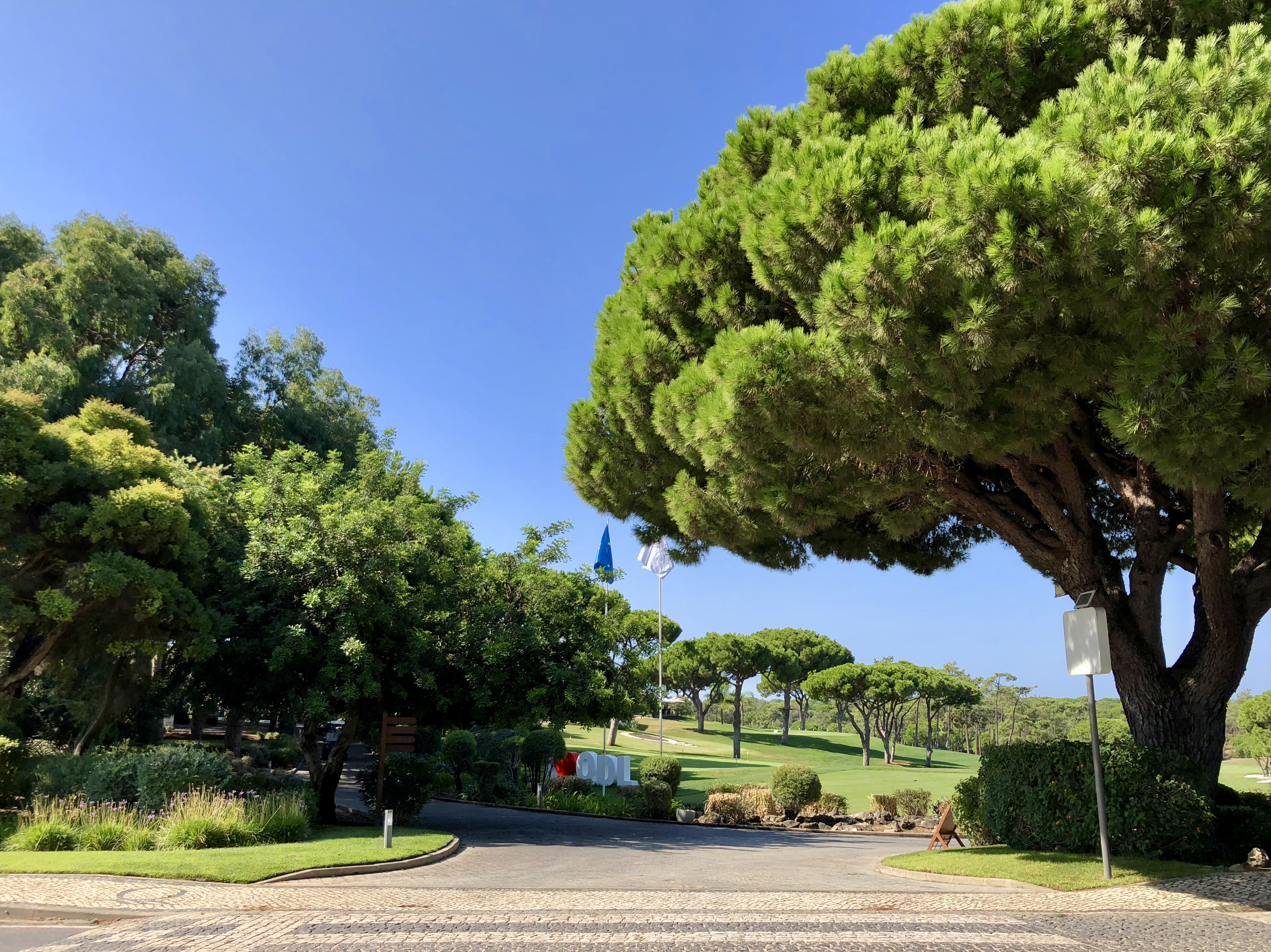
Entrance to Quinta do Lago.

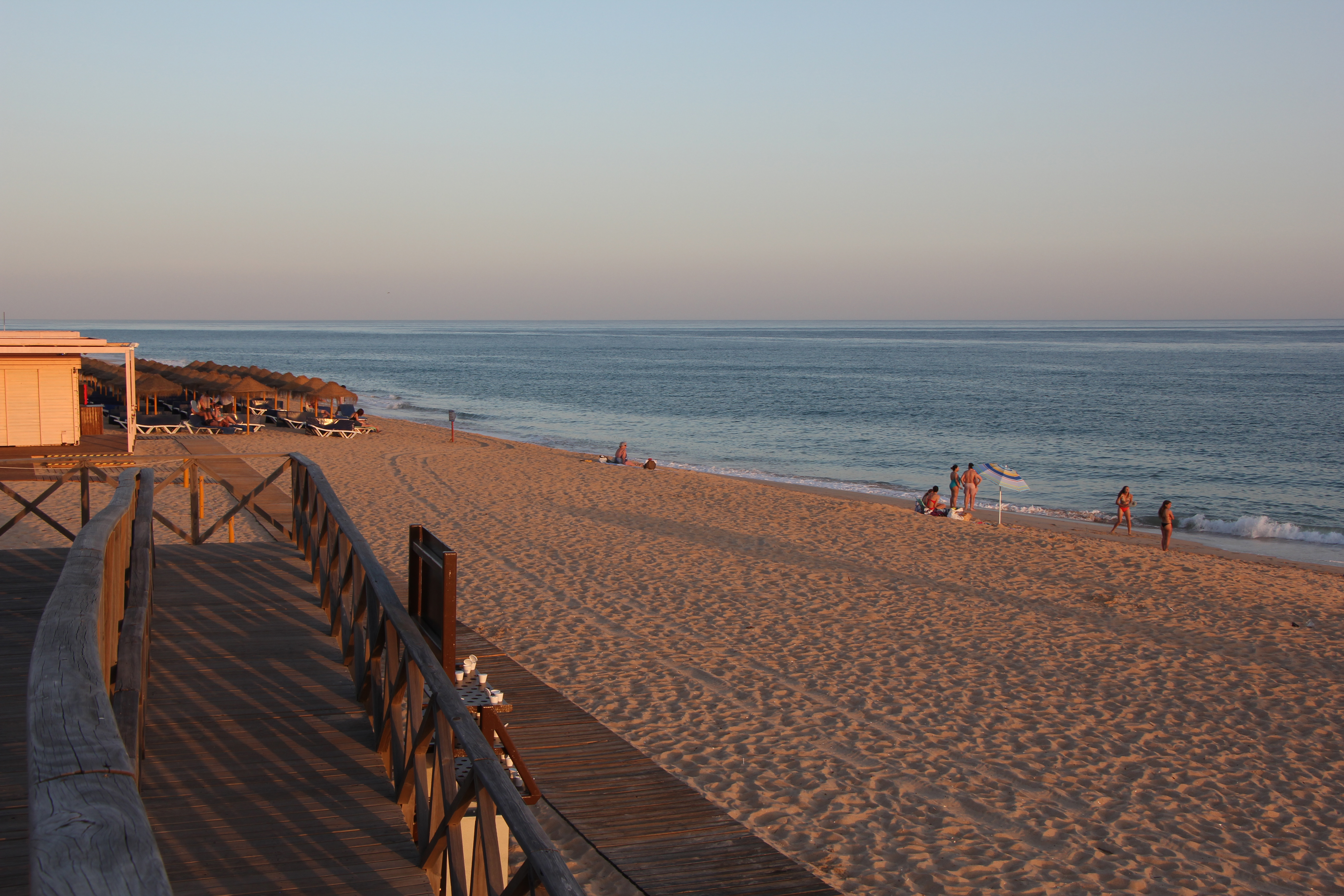
Praia da Quinta do Lago.

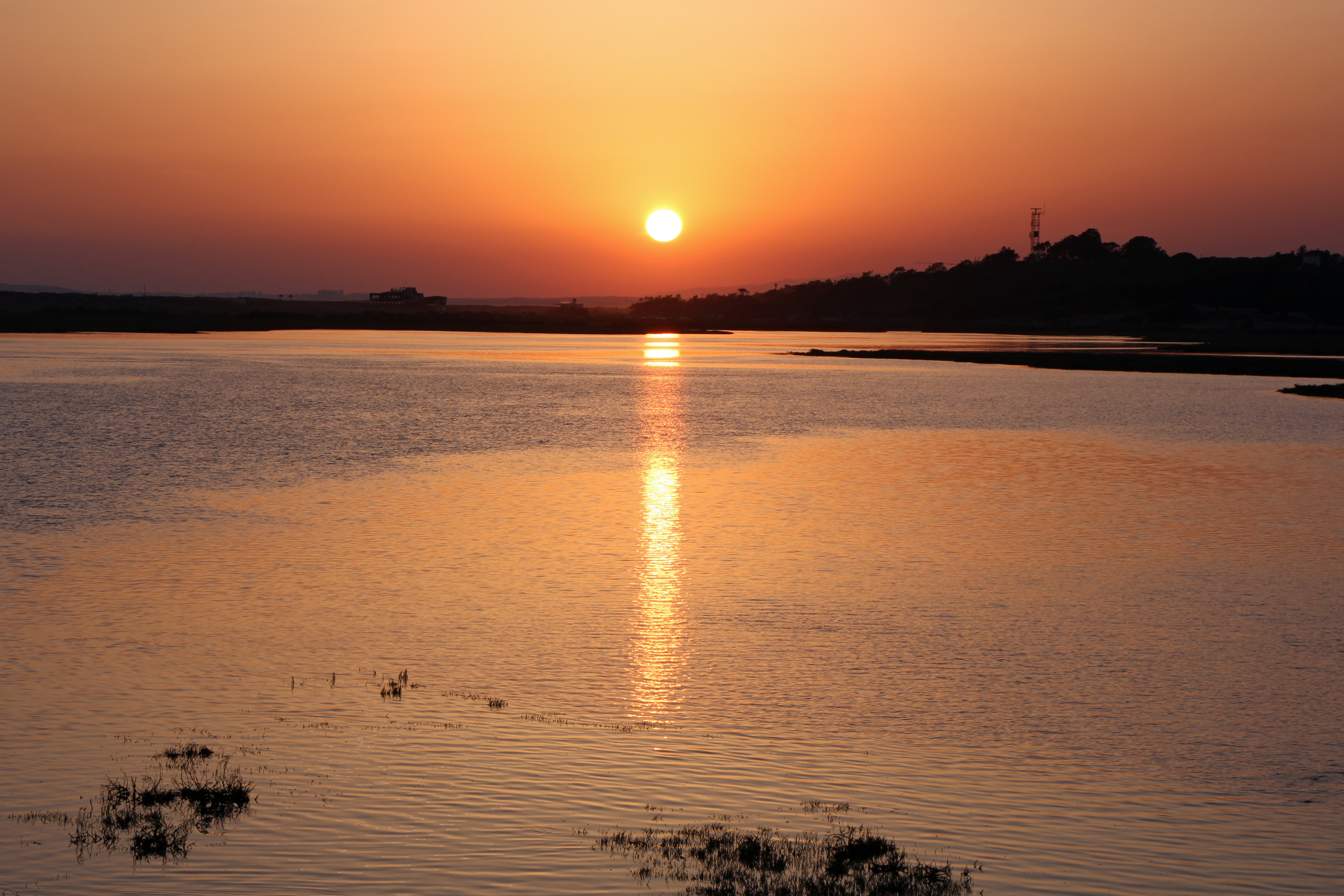
Sunset at Quinta do Lago.

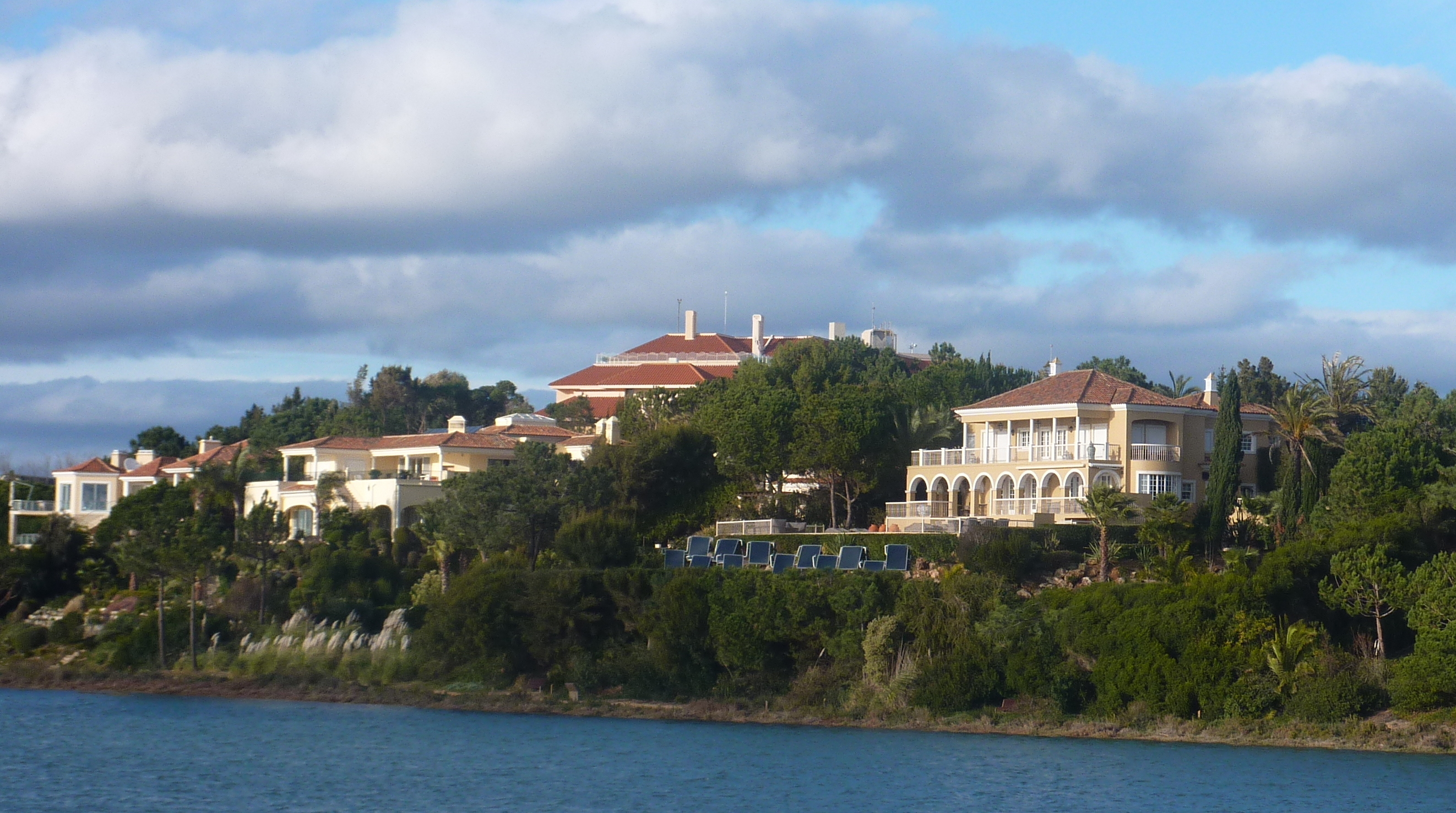
Villas overlooking the water.

== See also ==
- List of golf courses in Portugal
