= Almancil =

- Civil parish
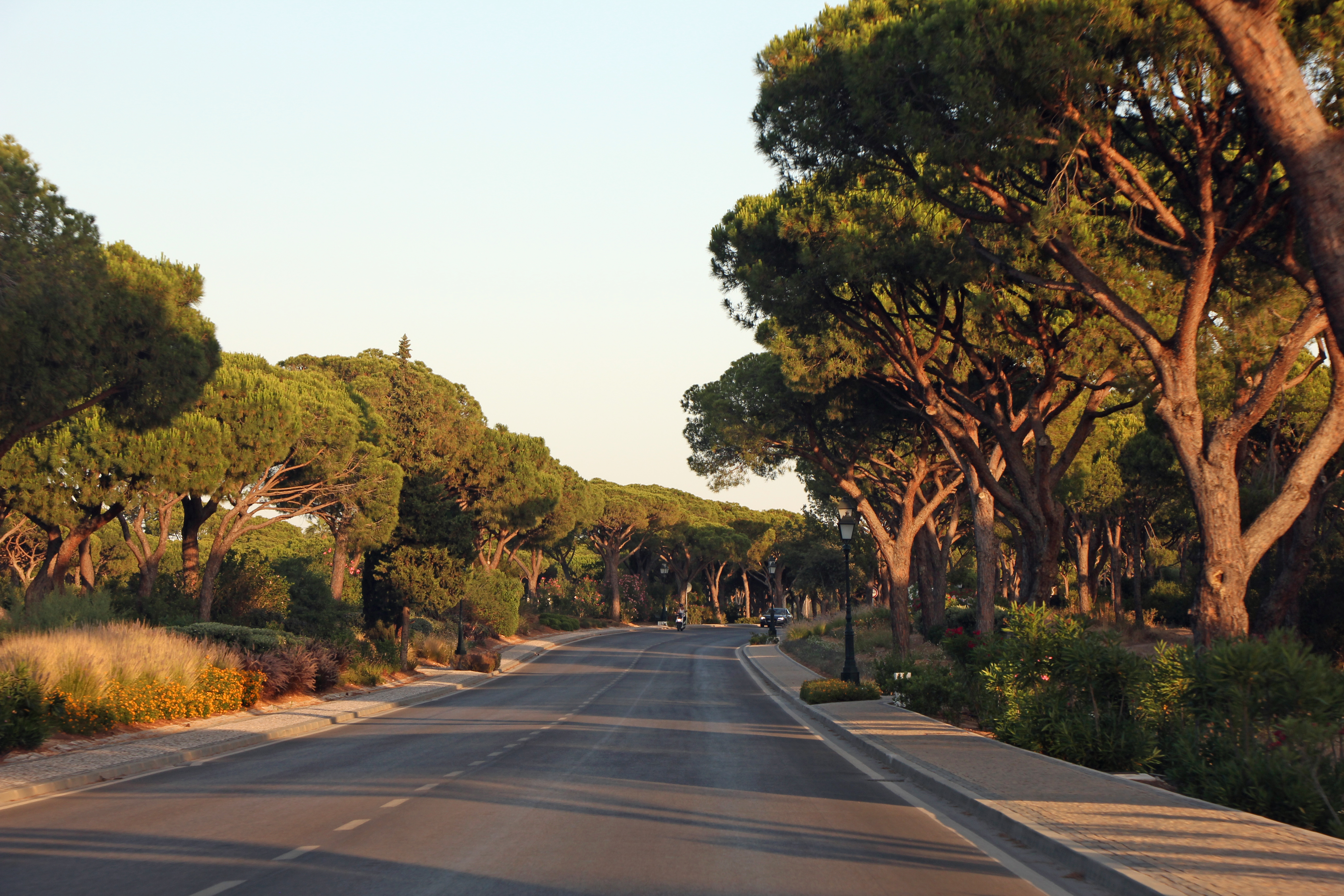
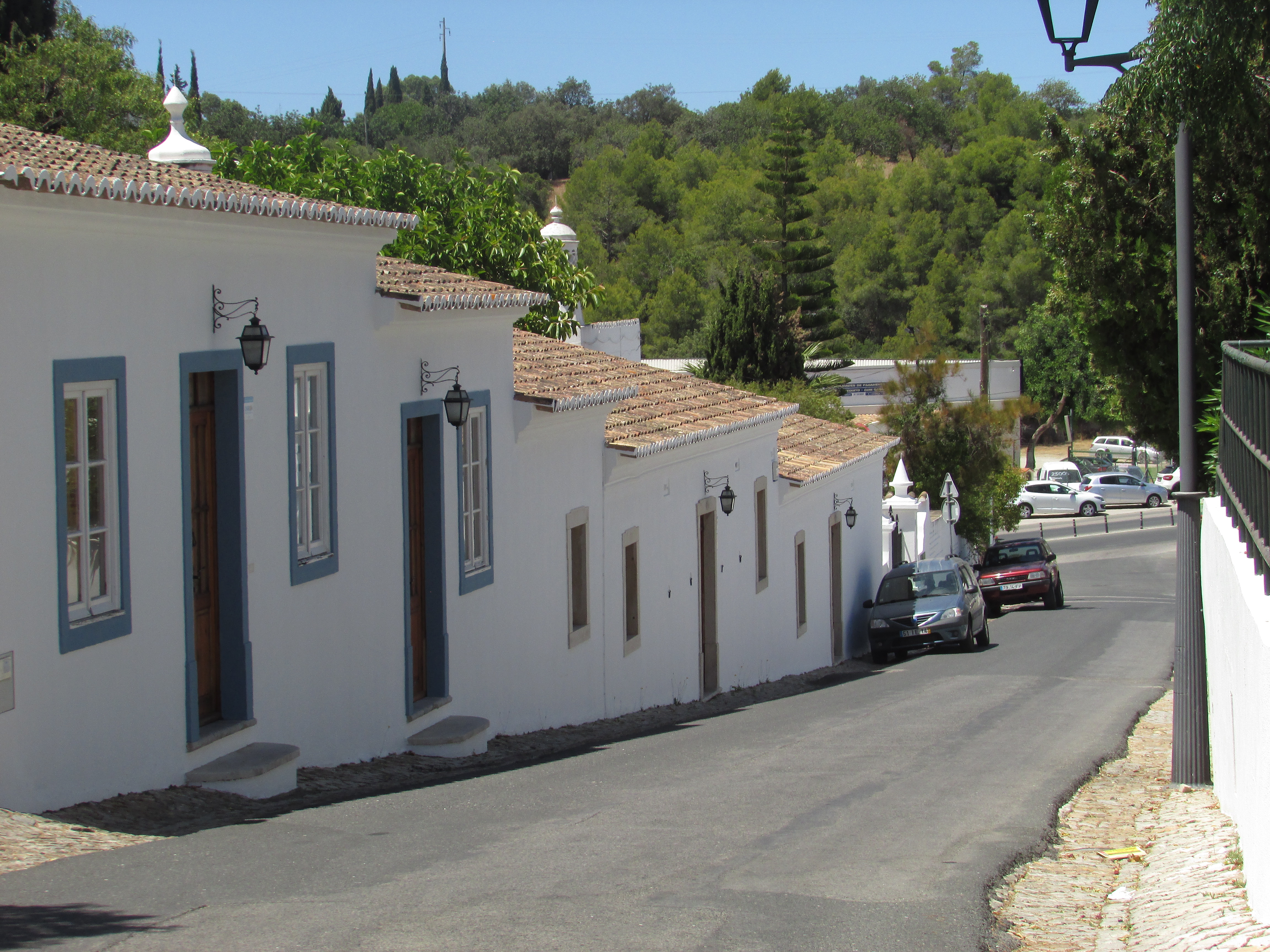
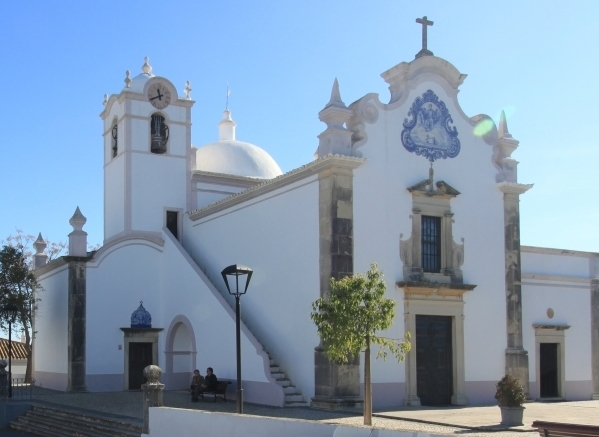

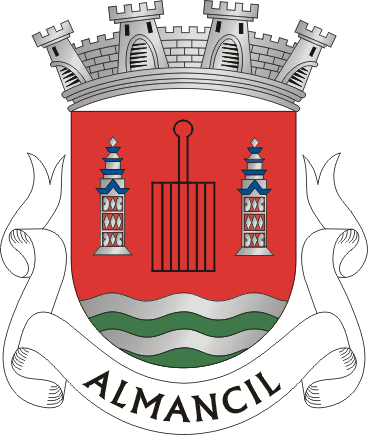
- Coat of arms

- Location in Portugal
- Coordinates: 37.086°N 8.032°W
- Country: Portugal
- Region: Algarve
- Intermunic. comm.: Algarve
- District: Faro
- Municipality: Loulé

Area
  - Total: 62.30 km^{2} (24.05 sq mi)

Population (2011)
  - Total: 10,677
  - Density: 171.4/km^{2} (443.9/sq mi)
- Time zone: UTC+00:00 (WET)
  - Summer (DST): UTC+01:00 (WEST)

Almancil (Portuguese pronunciation: [almɐ̃ˈsil]) is a town and freguesia in the Loulé Municipality, in the affluent Golden Triangle region of the Algarve of southern Portugal. Almancil is known for its three Michelin star restaurants, the most of any town in the Algarve.

The town had a population of 10,677 inhabitants in 2011, in an area of 62.30 square kilometres (24.05 mi^{2}).

== History ==
First referred to as Almansil, Almancil had an Arabic origin; it was likely Almançal, which means "inn" or another variant suggesting a watercourse (Almansil). The territory that is today Almancil remotes to the Paleolithic, with archaeological excavations unearthing vestages from remote settlements. The more important artifacts come from the Roman occupation from São João da Venda, Ludo and Quinta do Lago, with the latter occupied by Islamic forces.

In the 16th century, Alexandre Massai (who served the Portuguese Crown) realized excavations along the coastal fortifications in the Algarve, discovering the plans for the fort of Farrobilhas, the old fortification that dominated Almancil (but today lost due to the coastal advance). Visits by the members of the Order of Santiago, in the middle of the 17th century, mentioned the existence of the hermitage of Nossa Senhora de Farrobilhas (also destroyed since this period).

In the 18th century, the reconstruction of the hermitage of São Lourenço, then in ruins, in fulfillment of a promise made to the saint by the population, brought new impetus to the communal religious life. The temple, which was barely touched by the 1755 earthquake, became one of the most important in the region after its restoration: celebrations occur annually on 10 August, in honour of Saint Lawrence.

Almancil has been a civil parish since 1836; following expansion and development in the 19th century, the parish of São João da Venda was divided between the municipalities of Faro and Loulé. In the west, the civil parish of São João Batista de Almancil and portion of the neighbouring territory of São Clemente was integrated into the new Almancil.

Due to an influx of tourism into the Algarve, the resident population of the parish expanded, resulting in the 18 December 1987 elevation of the parish to category of town.

== Geography ==
Almancil is located along the south-eastern coastline of the municipality of Loulé, fronting the civil parishes of Quarteira and São Clemente (in the municipality of Loulé) and Santa Bárbara de Nexe, Faro (Sé e São Pedro) and Montenegro (in the municipality of Faro).

The natural landscape of the parish is marked by the Nature Park of the Ria Formosa, a site of great botanical value and a natural habitat of rare ornithological species. Along the 12 kilometres (7.5 mi) coast are the several popular beaches: Ancão, Quinta do Lago, Garrão and Vale do Lobo.

== Economy ==
The economy of Almancil supports the nearby holiday and residential developments: Quinta do Lago and Vale do Lobo. In addition to several tourist-oriented restaurants, real estate offices, supermarkets, flowershops, garden centers, interior decorators and furnishing shops support the local market.

With average land prices starting at €5000 per 1 square metre (1.2 yd^{2}), Quinta do Lago has the most expensive property rates in Portugal, along with neighboring Vale do Lobo.

== Architecture ==
=== Civic ===
- Algarve Stadium (Portuguese: Estádio Algarve), used in the 2004 European Football Championship
- Cinema Miranda
- Fiscal Guard Post Ilha de Faro (Portuguese: Posto da Guarda Fiscal, FG, da Ilha de Faro)
- Fiscal Guard Post Anção (Portuguese: Posto da Guarda Fiscal, FG, Anção)
- Gardens of Hotel Grampiam (Portuguese: Jardins do Hotel Grampiam)
- Gardens of Quinta do Lago (Portuguese: Jardins da Quinta do Lago)

=== Religious ===
- Church of São Lourenço de Almancil (Portuguese: Igreja Paroquial de Almansil/Igreja de São Lourenço de Almancil)
- Hermitage of São João da Venda (Portuguese: Ermida de São João da Venda)
