= Alto Golf and Country Club =

Coordinates: 37.13070°N 8.59140°W

- Interactive map of Alto Golf and Country Club

Club information
- Location: Algarve, Portugal
- Established: 1991
- Type: Private
- Tota holes: 18
- Tournaments: TAP (Air Portugal) Amateur Open 1995; Johnnie Walker Amateur Classic 1998
- Website: www.altoclub.com
- Designed by: Sir Henry Cotton
- Par: 70
- Length: 5,896 metres (6,486 yards)

Alto Golf and Country Club is a golf and country club resort complex located in Portugal’s Western Algarve. The resort contains landscaped gardens with villas, apartments and townhouses, which offer views of the sea, the golf course or the gardens.

The resort's 18 hole, par 72 golf course, was the last to be designed by Sir Henry Cotton. The course, which measures 6125 metres from the back tees, spans across two gently sloping valleys and has winding fairways and elevated greens. The opening nine holes overlook the bay of Lagos, while the back nine is set on rolling slopes. The golf course no longer forms part of Alto Golf & Country Club, being now owned and managed by the Pestana Group.

== Score Card ==
Hole	Par	Whites Length	Yellows Length	Reds Length
1	3	151mt / 165yd	mt / 0yd	128mt / 140yd
2	4	347mt / 379yd	mt / 0yd	225mt / 246yd
3	4	393mt / 430yd	mt / 0yd	327mt / 358yd
4	4	378mt / 413yd	mt / 0yd	298mt / 326yd
5	5	419mt / 458yd	mt / 0yd	349mt / 382yd
6	4	378mt / 413yd	mt / 0yd	335mt / 366yd
7	3	187mt / 205yd	mt / 0yd	166mt / 182yd
8	4	304mt / 332yd	mt / 0yd	268mt / 293yd
9	4	352mt / 385yd	mt / 0yd	325mt / 355yd
In	35	2732mt / 3181yd	0mt / 0yd	2421mt / 2648yd
10	4	390mt / 427yd	mt / 0yd	314mt / 343yd
11	3	130mt / 142yd	mt / 0yd	104mt / 114yd
12	3	123mt / 135yd	mt / 0yd	91mt / 100yd
13	4	416mt / 455yd	mt / 0yd	373mt / 408yd
14	4	262mt / 287yd	mt / 0yd	233mt / 255yd
15	4	370mt / 405yd	mt / 0yd	340mt / 372yd
16	5	604mt / 661yd	mt / 0yd	530mt / 580yd
17	3	160mt / 175yd	mt / 0yd	104mt / 114yd
18	5	532mt / 582yd	mt / 0yd	493mt / 539yd
In	35	2732mt / 3267yd	0mt / 0yd	2582mt / 2824yd
Total	70	5896mt / 6448yd	0mt / 0yd	5003mt / 5471yd

== See also ==
- List of golf courses in Portugal
