= Prostitution in Brazil =

Legalization – prostitution legal and regulated Decriminalization – No criminal penalties for prostitution Abolitionism – prostitution is legal, but organized activities such as brothels and pimping are illegal; prostitution is not regulated Neo-abolitionism illegal to buy sex and for 3rd party involvement, legal to sell sex Prohibitionism – prostitution illegal Legality varies with local laws

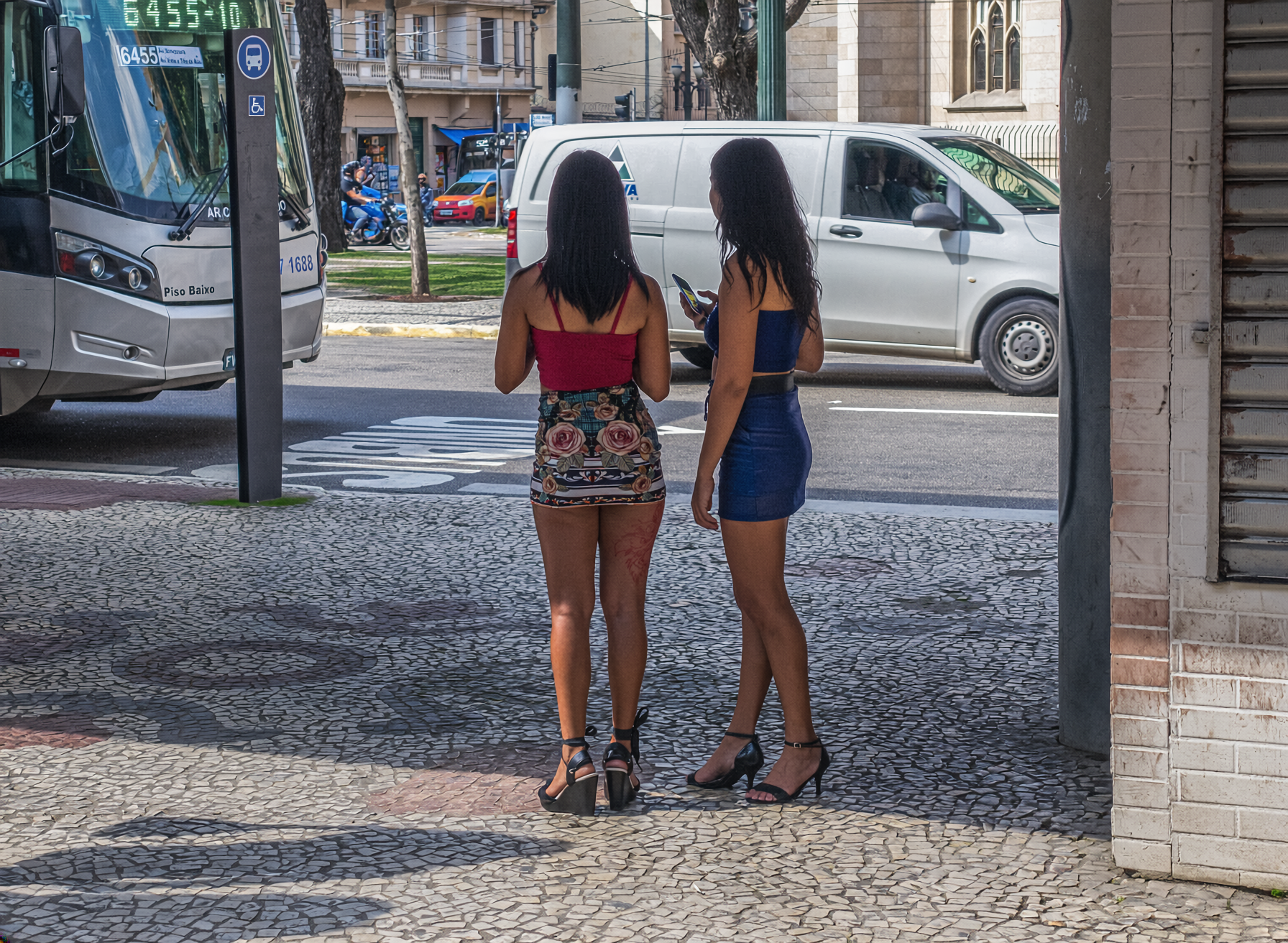
Prostitution in Liberdade, São Paulo

Prostitution in Brazil is legal, in terms of exchanging sex for money, as there are no laws forbidding adults from being professional sex workers, but it is illegal to operate a brothel or to employ sex workers in any other way. Public order and vagrancy laws are used against street prostitutes. The affordability of prostitutes is the most inquired-about term in word completion queries on purchases on Google in Brazil.

== Extent ==
A 2013 survey published by UNAIDS estimated there to be 546,848 prostitutes in the country.

Exploitation of children and teenagers through prostitution in Brazil is widespread and a serious problem. Brazil is considered to have the worst levels of child sex trafficking after Thailand, with an estimated 250,000 children involved. The phenomenon is closely related with high levels of poverty and inequality in some areas of the country. According to the recently released Protection Project report, various official sources agree that from 250,000 to 500,000 children live as child prostitutes.

NGOs and officials report some police officers ignore the exploitation of children in sex trafficking, patronize brothels, and rob and assault women in prostitution, impeding identification of sex trafficking victims.

The government of Brazil was working stringently to clamp down on child prostitution.

== Regulation ==
Prostitution itself (exchanging sex for money) in Brazil is legal, as there are no laws forbidding adult sex work, but it is illegal to operate a brothel or to employ sex workers in any other way.

The houses might be illegal, but are not unusual in Brazil. Most of them are full of corruption and sexual exploitation. The federal deputy Jean Wyllys presented, in 2013, the Gabriela Leite Law Project. A project that aims to regulate the sex worker profession and rights.

In 2002 pressure by the sex worker organization Davida contributed to the Brazilian Ministry of Labor adding "sex worker" to an official list of occupations. Professional sex work is not regulated in any way (no mandatory health checks, no licenses are issued, etc.), but sex workers and call girls can contribute to the official government pension fund and receive benefits when they retire.

Fernando Gabeira, founder of the Green Party, has been a strong voice for sex workers' rights in Brazil and introduced legislation in Congress to recognize sex workers as a profession. The bill was defeated in 2007.

Brazilian sex workers have campaigned for the repeal of laws criminalizing the maintenance of whorehouses and pimping. Those offenses carry sentences from two to five years in prison. They demanded that they should pay social benefits and get all the privileges like any other worker. The National Network of Sex Professionals (Rede Brasileira de Prostitutas) was angry at Beijing's (4th) International Conference on Women for their condemnation of prostitution. Their leader, ex-prostitute and sociologist Gabriela da Silva Leite, said that she had classes with sociologist Fernando Henrique Cardoso at University of São Paulo, who later became Brazil's president.

=== Government website ===
The government's website on sex workers Brazil's Labor and Employment Ministry Primer on Sex Professional, which describes sex work as labor, has been the source of controversy, with some accusing the government of encouraging professional sex work. However, this is not the purpose of the site. Rather, the Ministry of Labor site simply lists all of the characteristics of prostitution as work: i.e., what a prostitute is typically expected to do in the course of their labor. The site in no way encourages or "advises" about prostitution.

The press reported at the end of 2008 that a government official has announced that the site would be "toned down" following criticism by the media. The law professor Luiz Flavio Gomes has told the O Globo newspaper in its online edition that "What is on the site gives the impression of an apology for sexual exploitation."

"Professional of sex" is described as follows: "They [the sex worker] works on their own initiative, in the street, in bars, night-clubs, hotels, harbor, highways and in garimpos (gold prospecting places). They act in different environments: open air, closed places and inside vehicles, in irregular schedules. In the exercise of some of their activities they can be exposed to vehicles gases, to bad weather, to sound pollution and to social discrimination. There are still risks of getting STD infections, bad-treatment, street violence, and death."

== History ==
=== Prostitution and slavery ===
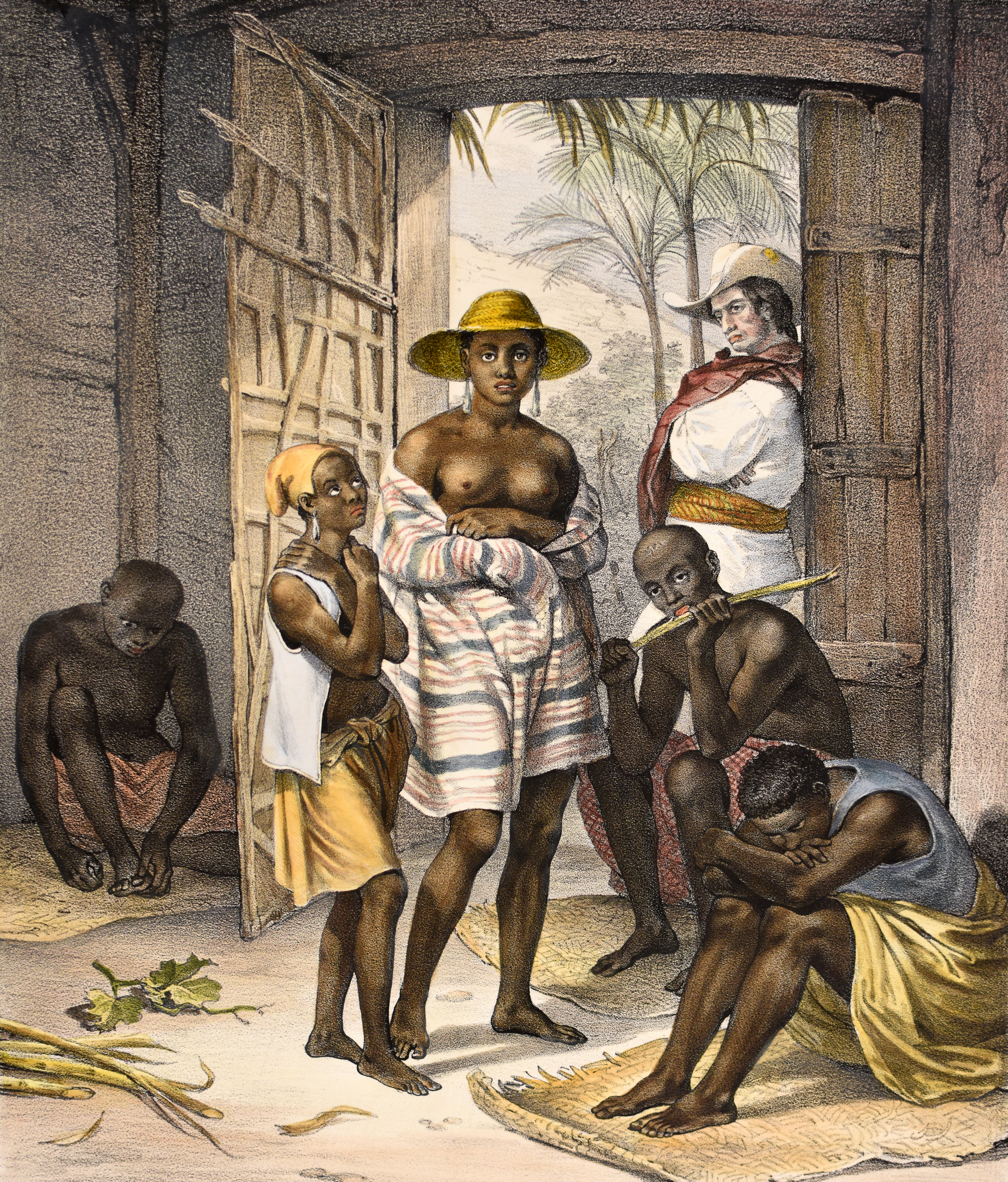
Portrait of a Slave by Rugendas, 1835

After little successful attempts with enslaved Indians, in the 16th century the Portuguese began to import black Africans to Brazil. The slaves also had to be sexually available to their owners, and also to their overseers, friends, relatives, visitors, traveling tradesmen, merchants and others. From there it was only a small step to prostitution with enslaved negroes and mulattoes women and girls. Since slaves were considered as things and not as persons, similar to animals, they were not protected by any laws and could be exploited almost without restriction. There were also no restrictions on the use of minor slave girls in the brothels. Many slaveowners also sent their slaves to the streets to make money by selling homemade sweets, small products or services, and as if it were the most natural thing of the world they also used the opportunity to decorate girls with a few colorful and gold ribbons. The young slave girls and women were sent either to work in the brothels or had to offer themselves at the windows of the houses of their owners or they received a passport from their mistress or their master which allowed them to spend the night in the streets, and in dawn they had to return and with the money they earned from prostitution. If the stipulated minimum amount was not achieved, the usual punishments on the slaves were carried out.

During the first half of the 19th century the slaves, who were destined for prostitution, were bought directly from the African traders. After the end of official slavery between Africa and America, the slave girl were delivered by the large farms in Minas Gerais and northeastern Brazil to the brothels and pimps. Pimps, often poor "gypsies" or small criminals, came to great prosperity and lived "in the greatest lascivious behavior among their host of young, submissive black sex slaves." Even in private classifieds about the sale of private female house slaves, there was often quite unashamedly pointed out to the willingness and sexual subservience of "well-behaved" black and mulatto girls.

There were in the 19th century four types of prostitutes. First, the negroes and mulattoes, who had to be prostitutes by orders of their owner. Often, they had to deliver the entire income, some others were allowed to keep part of the money for incentive, and others had to bring a minimum each day, otherwise they were beaten or tortured. The second category were poor free women, often ex-slaves or their daughters, who inhabited miserable huts, and there or on the street they prostituted themselves and their daughters. The third category were foreign girls who had been lured or sold to Brazil under false promises. Although they were free persons in the law, they were treated as slaves, trapped in the brothels, forced into debt bondage, beaten and tortured, when they couldn't earn enough money to pay the debts, the high interest rates, rental fees for their room and the other costs of their life. The fourth category was made up of French and other courtesans who lived in their own large houses and possessed carriages and exquisite jewelry and frequented theaters and other sociological events.

The fact that the enslaved girls and women were exploited in prostitution without misery nor protection by the law was also used as an argument for the abolitionism, the social movement to abolish slavery in the 19th century. The Lei do Ventre Livre ("Law of the free belly"), according to which children of slaves were no longer slaves themselves, also decided that slaves were allowed to save money, which their master could not arbitrarily take away from them, and with which they could free themselves. As a result, it became more interesting for slave girls to become prostitute, because this way they had a chance to earn a tip for themselves. The inhibition to prostitute themselves was usually low for the female slaves, because they had learned since childhood that they had no sexual self-determination and were accustomed to be raped. However, the custody and administration of the savings of a slave was the responsibility of the owner, and he could try to manipulate the savings and list cost and penalties like tricky pimps do. There have been even processes of female slaves against their masters, where the women often had to prove with the help of clients that they had been "industrious" and diligent and had numerous customers, much more as listed in the wrong accounting of the master.

Although there had been several attempts to prohibit prostitution, there were no laws against it. Prostitutes were sometimes charged with being vagabonds and with provoking disorder.

=== Early 20th century ===
After the abolition of official slavery in Brazil by the Lei Áurea (Golden Law) in 1888, many former female slaves and their daughters and granddaughters tried to earn some money as prostitutes. In addition, there were an increasing number of women and girls imported from Europe, especially from the poorer regions of Eastern Europe: Jews, Albanians, Austria-Hungarians, and for a higher price French and Italians. The novels of the well-known Brazilian writer Jorge Amado portray this time; in his books there are often more prostitutes than other women. The peak period of prostitution was around 1930 when the brothels of Rio de Janeiro were famous all over the world. The brothel Casa Rosa is today a cultural center.

=== Jewish forced prostitutes in Brazil ===
The Jewish prostitutes are a special chapter in the history of prostitution in Brazil. In 1867, to the port of Rio de Janeiro came seventy Jewish women from Poland, who had been attracted by false promises and were abused as prostitutes. Like their subsequent Jewish sufferers from Russia, Lithuania, Romania, Austria, and even France, they were called "Polacas" (Polish Girls). About 1,200 women followed them in the next years. Most were victims of the Jewish pimp mafia Zwi Migdal. Their members traveled to the impoverished towns of Eastern Europe and established themselves as rich businessmen from Latin America looking for brides. In truth, they were trafficking. The women who believed their promises became sex slaves.

In 1931, Brazil counted more than 400 Jewish brothels. In 1936 the German writer Stefan Zweig visited Rio de Janeiro's famous red light district Mangue. He described in his diary the misery of these women, but he also noted that these Eastern European Jewish women promised exciting and unusual perversion. The prostitutes founded a second Jewish community in Rio, with their own cemetery and their own synagogue, because the prostitutes were rejected by the other Jews. There the women celebrated the Jewish festivals, although there was no liturgy for women at the time. The pimps were important sponsors of the Jewish theater. At the premieres, Polacas, luxuriously dressed, sat in the front rows and were presented to the potential clientele. The Second World War ended this trafficking of women. The Jewish prostitutes influenced the cultural life and the artist scene of Rio. They inspired musicians to many compositions. On average the women became only forty years old. There are three cemeteries of Jewish prostitutes in Brazil. In 1970, the last of the prostitutes lured into the country was buried at Rio's Jewish prostitute cemetery.

In 2007, Rio de Janeiro's Jewish community first conceived a Sabbath ceremony for Jewish prostitutes, which was designed only by women. The celebration was held not in a synagogue, but in the cultural center of the district Lapa, but there are still prejudices against these women.

=== Recent years ===
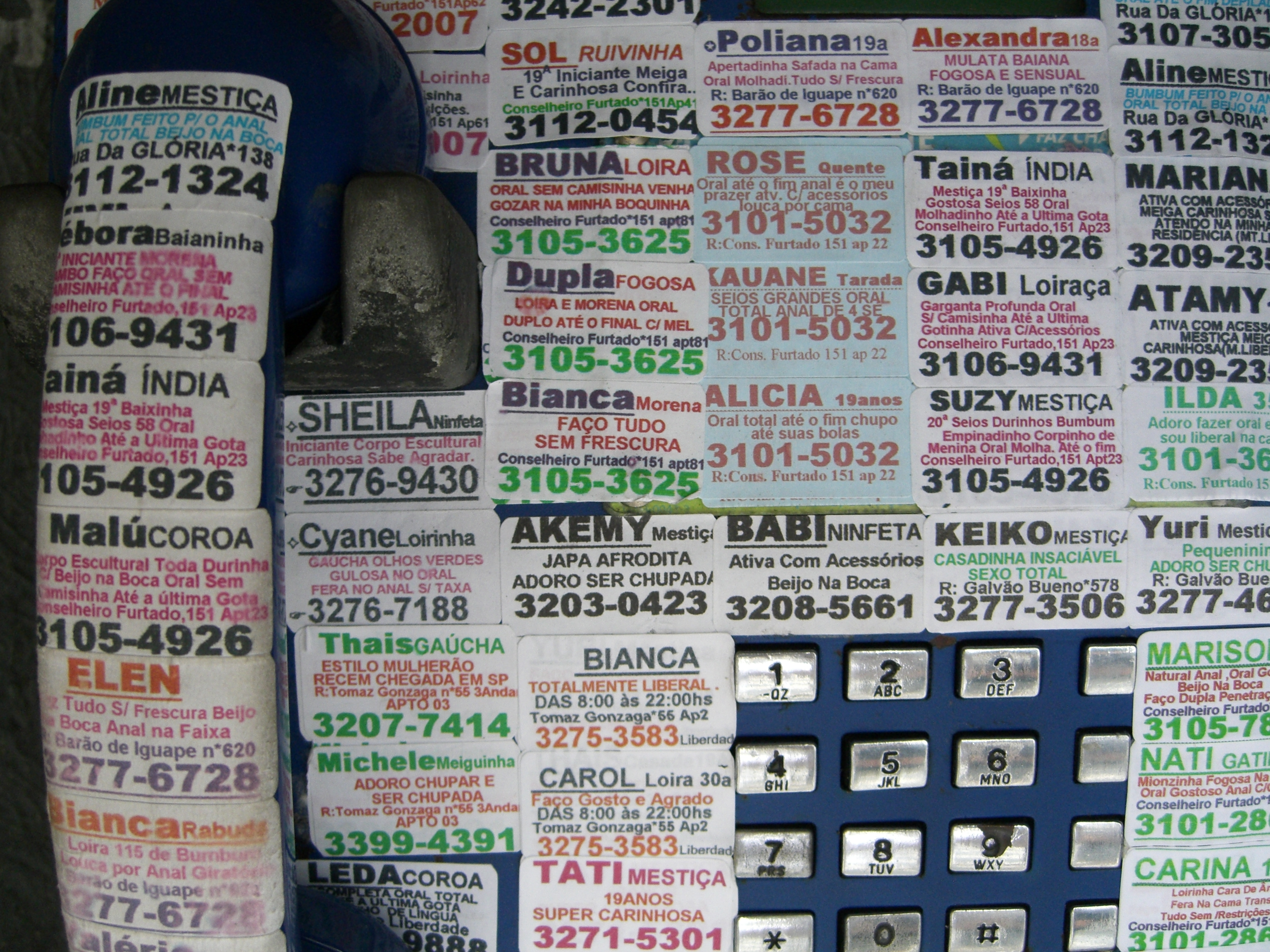
Stickers on a payphone advertising the services of prostitutes

According to a poll taken in 1998, 64% of the population thought professional sex work was immoral and should be made illegal, whereas 29% saw it as a job like any other. 59% (64% of women) believed that sex workers do what they do because they like it.

In the 2000s, sex worker Bruna Surfistinha gained media attention for her blog where she told of her experiences with clients. She became famous and wrote a 2005 autobiography, The Scorpion's Sweet Poison (Brazilian Portuguese: O Doce Veneno do Escorpião). One of the most important campaigners for the rights of prostitutes was Gabriela Leite, (1951–2013), a sex worker who led the campaign to have sex work recognized as a profession, so that sex workers would have access to the pension system. She is the founder of Davida, an organization for the rights of sex workers. There are several such organizations in the country, including the Network of Brazilian Prostitutes (Rede Brasileira de Prostitutas).

The state of Minas Gerais is home to the Association of Prostitutes of Minas Gerais (Associacao das Prostitutas de Minas Gerais, Aprosmig). The association came to public attention as a result of an annual contest in Belo Horizonte to award the title of Miss Prostitute, and it organized English language courses for prostitutes before the Soccer World Cup 2014 in Brazil and the Olympic Summer Games 2016. As a result of one of its initiatives, prostitutes working on the streets of Belo Horizonte were able to take credit card payments. Aprosmig also runs a small sex museum.

The most important districts devoted to commercial sex are the Vila Mimosa in Rio de Janeiro or the Rua Augusta in São Paulo, are well known. In the Rua Guaicurus in Belo Horizonte, Capital of the Federal State Minas Gerais, there are hundreds of naked or half-naked girls in small rooms or in front of them, where they can be seen and contacted by the men passing through the floors. Therefore, the houses are always teeming with slippery men who often do not even want to buy sex, but searching only the free visual stimuli. The fees are very cheap, but despite the large number of prostitutes, many girls get more than 20 clients per 12-hour shift. A prostitute needs between four and fifteen customers to pay the room rent. The rooms are small, poorly ventilated, dark and mostly without bathroom.

In April 2021, many prostitutes in Minas Gerais participated in a work stoppage with the goal of being recognized as a priority group for COVID-19 vaccines.

== HIV/AIDS ==
In 2003, it was estimated that about 6% of Brazilian sex workers were infected with HIV. Gabriela Silva Leite, the executive director of Prostitution Civil Rights, says that because of information campaigns, condom use among sex workers is high.

The Brazilian government turned down $40 million in U.S. anti-HIV/AIDS funding in 2005, because the U.S. government required all recipients to sign an anti-prostitution pledge. The Brazilian anti-AIDS program employs sex workers to hand out information and free condoms; Brazil's AIDS commissioner, Pedro Chequer, was quoted as saying: "Sex workers are part of implementing our AIDS policy and deciding how to promote it. They are our partners. How could we ask prostitutes to take a position against themselves?"

A Washington Post article stated that the Brazilian anti-AIDS program is considered by the United Nations to be the most successful in the developing world.

== Sex workers abroad ==
High numbers of Brazilian sex workers are found in various regions of the Americas, primarily Argentina, Chile, French Guiana, Paraguay, Suriname, Uruguay, and Venezuela, as well as in predominantly Romance-speaking Western European countries, including Portugal, Italy, Spain, Belgium, and the Netherlands, and to a lesser degree in Japan, the United Kingdom, and the United States.

== Sex tourism ==
From the 1960s to the 1990s, the brochures of travel agencies often included a large picture showing the rounded butts of Brazilian mulattoes in front of picturesque beach scenes. Because of the growing awareness with child prostitution, advertising is now much less direct, which does not mean that there is no longer any sex tourism. However, the government is increasingly frustrated with the fact that a number of foreign tourists travel to Brazil for sex tourism, including child prostitution, and has been able to combat and partially mitigate child prostitution since the beginning of the 21st century with campaigns and stronger police control.

Sex tourism exists throughout the country, but it is most apparent in coastal resort towns in the Northeast, South, and Southeast, and in major tourist destinations such as Rio de Janeiro and Fortaleza, Ceará, as well as in the wildlife tourist areas of the Pantanal and Amazon.

A 2006 University of Brasília study found that approximately one fourth of the 1,514 tourist destinations frequented by citizens had an active sexual commercial market for children and adolescents and also found, in combination with the Secretaria Especial dos Direitos Humanos (SEDH) and the UN Children's Fund, commercial sex involving children and adolescents in approximately one sixth of the country's 5,561 municipalities. In 2014 an English NGO announced they would run advertisements on British flights to Brazil to discourage tourists paying for sex with children during the FIFA World Cup.

== Sex trafficking ==
Brazil is a source, transit, and destination country for women and children subjected to sex trafficking. Brazilian women and children are exploited in sex trafficking within the country. Brazilian women are subjected to sex trafficking abroad, especially in Western Europe and China. Women and girls from other South American countries, especially Paraguay, are exploited in sex trafficking in Brazil. Brazilian men and transgender Brazilians have been exploited in sex trafficking in Spain and Italy.

Women are trafficked from all parts of the country. The government reported that trafficking routes existed in all states and the Federal District. The National Research on Trafficking in Women, Children, and Adolescents for Sexual Exploitation Purposes identified 241 international and national trafficking routes. Persons exploited in trafficking schemes typically come from low-income families and usually have not finished high school.

It is estimated that Brazil is responsible for 15% of women trafficked in South America, a great majority being from the North and the Northeast.

The United States Department of State Office to Monitor and Combat Trafficking in Persons ranks Brazil as a 'Tier 2' country.
