= Golden Triangle (Algarve) =

Tourist region in Portugal

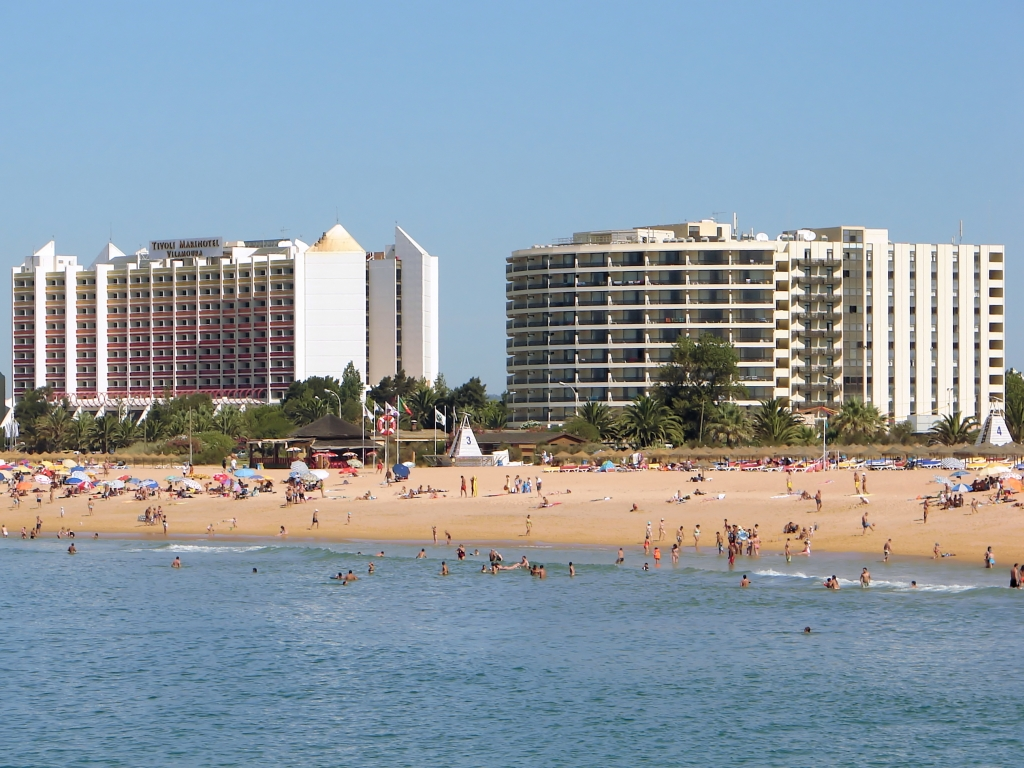
Vilamoura Beach, Vilamoura, Algarve, Portugal.

The Golden Triangle is the name given to the affluent region outside of Faro, capital of the Algarve region of Portugal. Famous for its luxury resorts and Michelin star restaurants, it is located between three points:

- Resort-town of Vilamoura
- Town of Almancil
- Luxury resorts of Quinta do Lago and Vale do Lobo

Vilamoura is one of the most popular tourist destinations in Portugal, home to a yacht marina and numerous resorts. Almancil is home to three Michelin starred restaurants, while Vilamoura has one. Quinta do Lago and Vale do Lobo are luxury resorts that have both hosted the Portuguese Open, part of the PGA European Tour, in 1976, 1984–1986, 1988, 1989, 1990, and 2001–2003.
