= Church of São Lourenço (Almancil) =

- Church of Saint Lawrence of Rome
- Igreja de São Lourenço
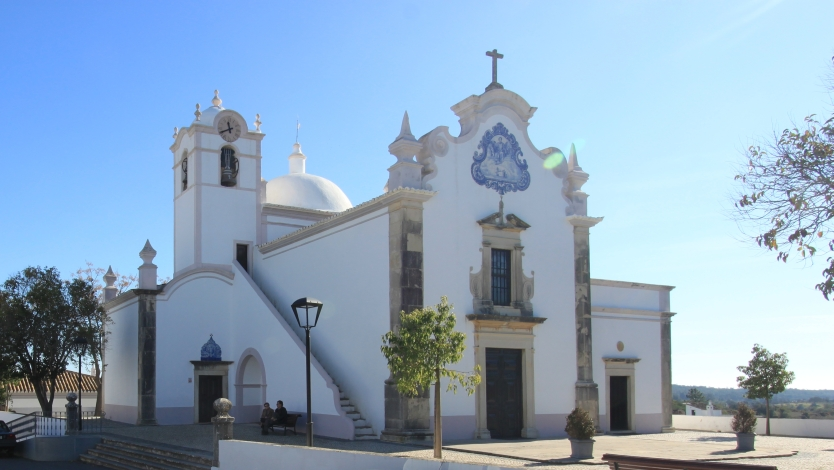
- The eclectic Baroque design of the Church of São Lourenço
- Church of São Lourenço
- 37°4′55.51″N 8°0′32.19″W
- Location: Faro, Algarve, Algarve
- Country: Portugal
- Denomination: Roman Catholic

History
- Dedication: Lawrence of Rome

Architecture
- Style: Baroque

Specifications
- Length: 19.55 m (64.1 ft)
- Width: 18.13 m (59.5 ft)

Administration
- Diocese: Diocese of Faro

The Church of São Lourenço (Portuguese: Igreja de São Lourenço) is a Church in the civil parish of Almancil, in the municipality of Loulé in the Portuguese Algarve.

== History ==
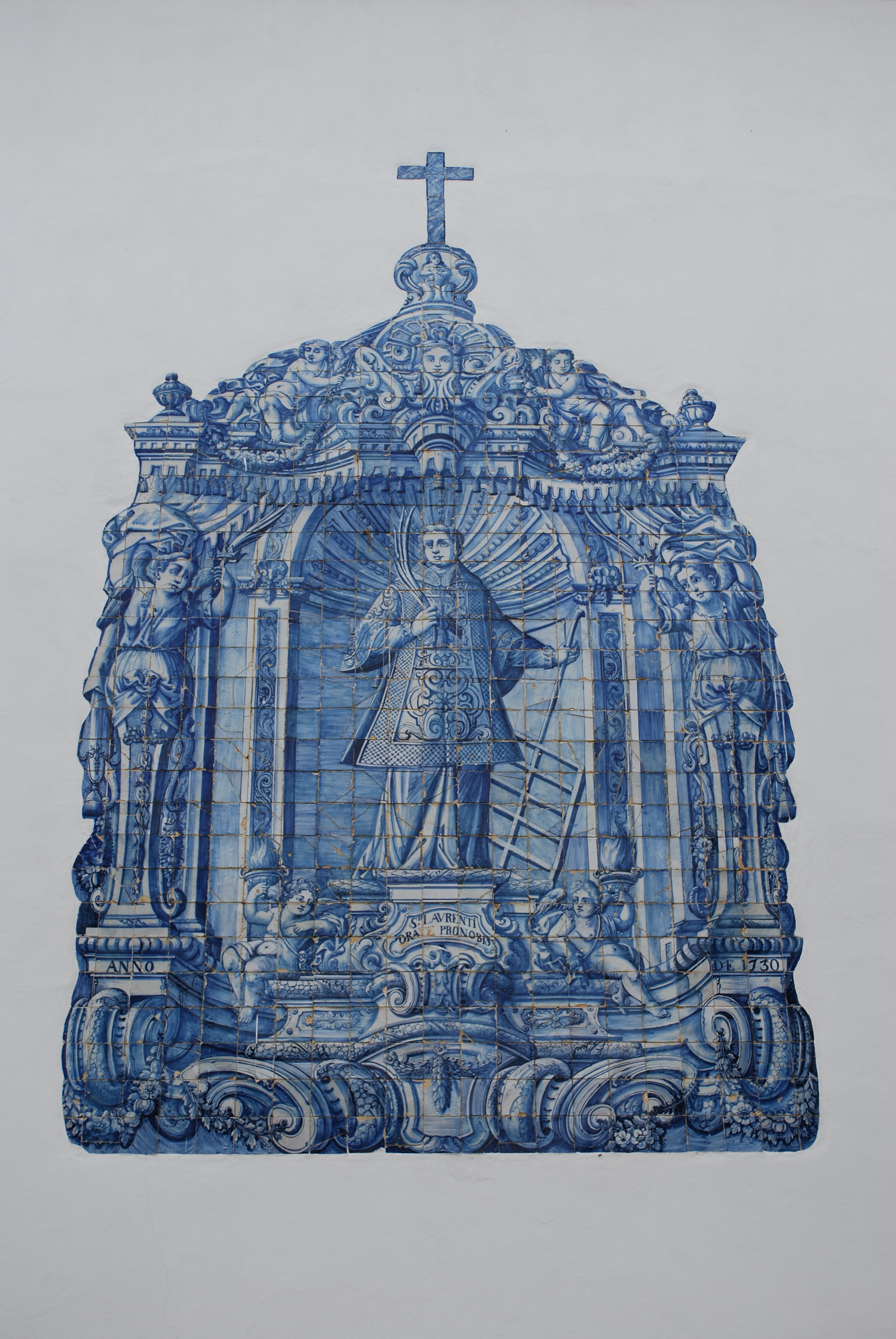
The azulejo tile depicting Saint Lawrence of Rome

The oldest recorded reference to this church came from 1672; the Livro da Freguesia de São João da Venda, referring to the ecclesiastical parish of São João de Venda, identified the visit of prelates to the parish. It was these same prelates that on 23 May 1684, addressed the necessity of constructing a temple in the area to the parish vicar.

For successive years, starting on 7 February 1693, there were references to the temple in the same Livro da Freguesia, including 16 August 1695 and 26 May 1715, but no reference to a period of construction or completion.

The azulejo tile was applied to the church in 1730 by Policarpo de Oliveira Bernardes, from an inscription in the choir. Between 1868 and 1869 a wooden choir was installed, without reusing the existing tile.

Two niches were constructed sometime during the 19th century, resulting in the destruction of some figurative azulejo tile.

The Catholic church, around 1968, began reconstruction of the church's roof and annex, in addition to removing the wood from the corner of the nave and reparation of the pavement, the doors and frames were repaired and there was re-plastering and lime of the facades. It was at this time that the choir, pulpit and lateral retables were removed. This work also included landscaping of the churchyard.

On 28 February 1969, following an earthquake, there was some damage to the building, including cracks in the walls linking the presbytery with the sacristy and the arches supporting the southern annex ceiling. The DGEMN intervened the following year to fix and repair the azulejo tile. This involved the calculated removal of tile, resurfacing of the walls and vaulted ceilings with cement mortar and sand, as well as other surfaces requiring retouching, including the sacristy.

The DGEMN Direcção-Geral de Edifícios e Monumentos Nacionais (General-Directorate for Buildings and National Monuments) intervened between 1969 and 1970, with repairs to the building caused by this event. This included the surveying and repositioning of the main ceiling coverings; the removal of existing cornerstones over the arches, and replacement by cement basis; the resealing of joints; plastering; assessment of the roofing; and the plastering of the exterior parapets. By the end of 1970, almost all the azulejo tile that covered the walls, vaulted ceiling and cupola had become extracted from the walls/coverings, with several broken, lost or in a state of imminent dislocation repaired.

In 1984 there was a reconsolidation of the wooden cupola.

== Architecture ==
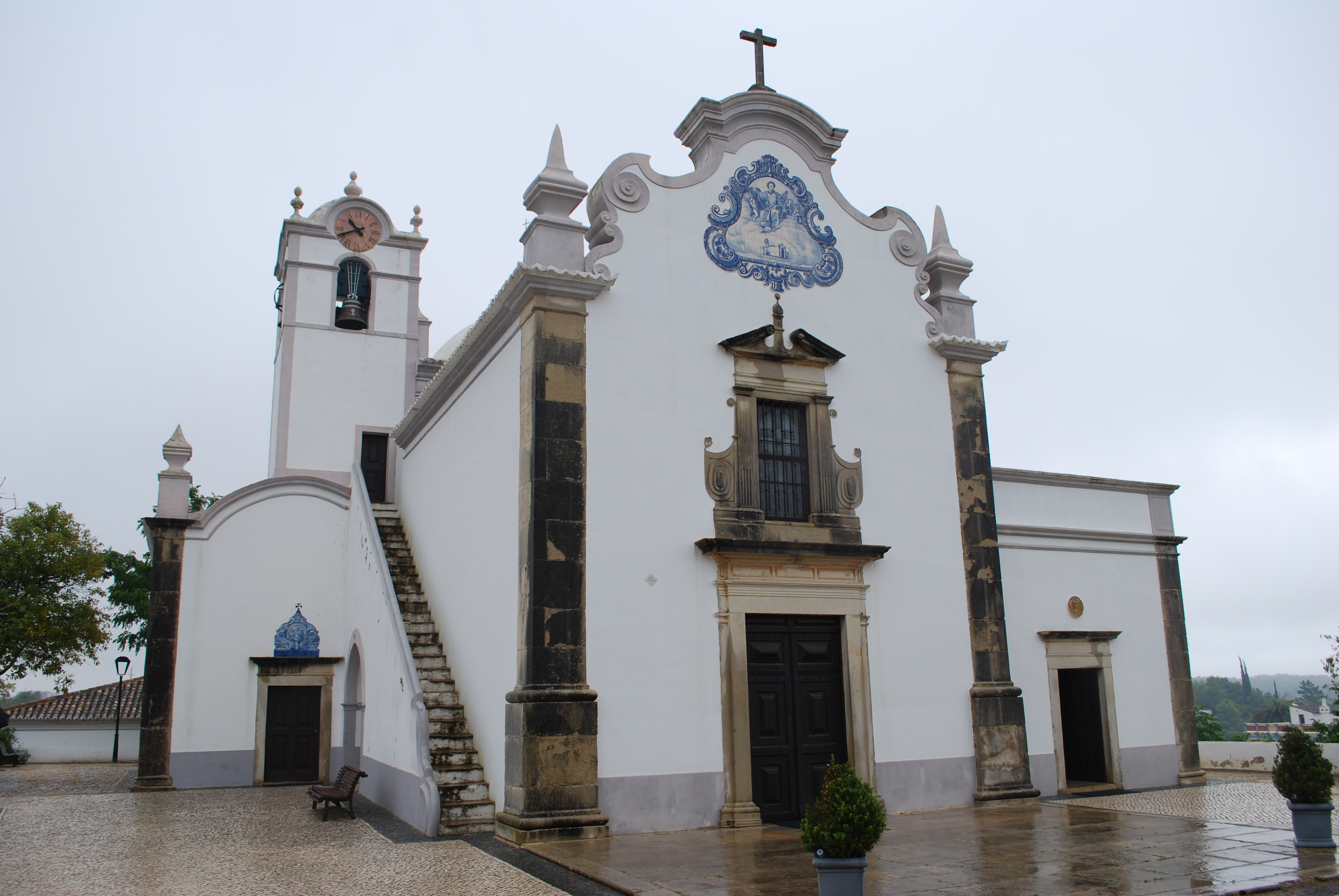
The front facade of the church, showing the two-tier format with azulejo tile crowning the frontispiece

The church is situated in an urban area, encircled by churchyard, and accessed by a staircase to the north. It is delimited by an elevated platform over the natural terrain, supported by walls in masonry and morter. The building and churchyard complex is circled by several small dependencies, which harmoniously form the group, including complimentary azulejo tiles designed by Policarpo de Oliveira Bernardes.

The plan of the church consists of one nave, with rectangular prebystery, lateral chapels, and sacristy in the north. The roofing is differentiated by coverings on the nave, cupola and pinnacles. The principal facade, with minimal decoration, consists of two volumes, with angular corners and a counter-curved frontispiece. A rectangular doorway, surmounted by a window, with lateral pilasters ending in pinnacles, crowned by a fanciful frontispiece and cross. The recessed second volume, is broken by a rectangular door, with a lateral doorway surmounted by the image of Saint Lawrence in stone. The southern lateral face, without decoration, is aligned with the church nave and marked by four small rectangular windows. In the head panel are blue and white azulejos with the image of Saint Lawrence, dating from 1730. The northern facade is marked by a belltower which rises above the sacristy, accessible from a long staircase at the front left of the main facade.

=== Interior ===
The barrel-vaulted nave is broken by a cupola, and totally covered in azulejo tile, except for the corners, frames and frames of the windows. These azulejos show scenes from the life of São Lawrence and in each arch, accompanied by his legend in Latin. Lawrence of Rome was martyred in Rome in 258, for challenging Emperor Decius who expected tribute from the church, to which he was deacon. Lawrence distributed the gold to the poor instead, and little reached the Emperor's coffers. Furious, the Emperor ordered the cleric be whipped with rods, then his back seared with burning hot iron, before being extended over a mound of embers (to die). The tiles depict: the saint healing two blind men; the saint giving money to the poor; the saint talking with Pope Sixtus II; the saint arguing for his Christian belief with Roman Emperor Valerian; and the saint's martyrdom.

Over the arches are allegorical figures: Preserverance, Liberty and Poverty, Chastity and Obedience, Piety and Patience, Awe of God and Understanding, and Humility. The tiles that cover the cupola following architectural designs with perspectives. Over the window is an inscription: "POLICARPO DE / OLIVEIRA BERN. / PINTOU ESTA OBRA DE AZU / LEIO" (Policarpo de Oliveira Bern. Painted this work of azulejo); in the centre of the vaulted nave is Lawrence in glory, accompanied by angels to his rest, and the caption: "FEITO / NO ANNO DE 1730 / SENDO VIGÁRIO GERAL O R.DO D.TOR M.EL DE SOUZA / TEIXEIRA / JUIS DOSTO" (Done in the year 1730, being the Vicar-General Ricardo Tormel de Sousa Teixeira judge). The extensive azulejo has resulted in it being referred to as the Igreja de Louça (Church of China). In the sacristy sillar are azulejo tiles, with bar and panels in flowering vases. In the nave's papal altar, there are two niches; the chancel with altar marble stone from Alicante and gilded altarpiece. The baptismal fonte is also constructed of Alicante stone.

The interior is totally decorated in 17th century azulejo tiles with scenes from the life of Saint Lawrence, designed by Policarpo de Oliveira Bernardes, which comprised one of the most important group of azulejo tile in the country. The complexity is comparable to the azulejo decoration in the presbytery of the Church of São Francisco in Faro, also attributed to this author and the Misercórdia Church in Viana do Castelo, complete by the Policarpo's father (António de Oliveira Bernardes).
