= Lourdes Barreto =

Brazilian prostitute and sex workers' rights campaigner

Lourdes Barreto is a former prostitute who has been active in promoting the rights of sex workers in Brazil. Co-founding the Brazilian Network of Prostitutes in the 1980s, she has also been instrumental in encouraging HIV prevention policies in Brazil. In 2023 she published an autobiography, Puta autobiografia (Whore autobiography) and in 2024 she was named as one of the 100 Women (BBC) of the year.

== Early life ==
Barreto was born in the municipality of Brejo de Areia, in the state of Paraíba in the north-east of Brazil, growing up in Catolé do Rocha in the same state. She left home at the age of 14, after facing domestic and sexual violence, working as a prostitute and travelling through several states, including the mining areas of Serra Pelada and Itaituba, in the mid-1950s. before settling in Belém in the state of Pará on the Amazon River. In Belém, working at night on the streets around the commercial centre, she began her activities in support of the rights of sex workers. She has a tattoo on her arm that says Eu sou puta (I am a whore).

== Activism ==
In 1987, Barreto founded, together with Gabriela Leite, the Brazilian Network of Prostitutes, one of the first organizations in support of sex workers in Brazil. This network was to play an important role in establishing the International Whores' Day, celebrated every year on 2 June. She sought election to the Belém city council in 2000 but was not elected, despite receiving significant support. Later she became the first prostitute to serve on the National Council of Women's Rights. She established the Group of Women Prostitutes of the State of Pará (Gempac), which combats prejudice against sex workers.

== Autobiography ==
Barreto published her autobiography in 2023, entitled Puta autobiografia (Whore autobiography). It was published with financial support from the state. A video documentary about her life, for which she has written the script, is in process. She was honoured a by the Piratas da Batucada samba school at the Belém Carnival in 2023.

== Personal life ==
Barreto has had four husbands, four children and ten grandchildren.
