= Porto Santo Golfe =

- The 'risk and reward' par 4 14th hole.
- Interactive map of Porto Santo Golfe
- 33°03′06.0″N 16°22′13.0″W

Club information
- Location: Porto Santo, Madeira, Portugal.
- Established: 1 October 2004
- Operator: Mario Silva
- Total holes: 27
- Tournaments: Madeira Islands Open
- Website: portosantogolfe.com

North & South Course
- Designed by: Seve Ballesteros
- Par: 72 (71 for Madeira Islands Open
- Length: 7,041 yards
- Course record: 64 - Richard Bland & Callum McCauley

Pitch & Putt
- Par: 27

Porto Santo Golfe is a 27-hole golf club on scenic Porto Santo Island in Madeira, Portugal. It opened in 2004 and was designed by the Spanish 5-time major winner, Seve Ballesteros.

== Layout ==
The 7,041 yard, par 72 layout features views of the coastline, particularly on the back nine, as holes 13, 14 and 15 run alongside the coast. The signature hole is the par 3 13th, which measures 200 yards and requires a shot over a gorge to reach the cliff-top green. There is also a nine-hole pitch and putt course, tennis facilities and an equestrian centre at the club.

== Tournaments ==
Porto Santo Golfe hosts the Madeira Islands Open on the European Tour. Changes made to the course for the tournament included a new back tee for the 14th, and the shortening of the par 5 3rd, so that it plays as a par 4. The course therefore plays as a 6,983 yard par 71 as opposed to the standard par 72 layout.

== See also ==
- Golf clubs and courses in Portugal
