= Gramacho =

Golf resort east of Portimão, Portugal

Club information
- Location: Algarve, Portugal
- Established: 1991
- Owner: Carvoeiro Golfe, SA
- Operator: Pestana Golf & Resorts
- Tota holes: 18
- Tournaments: Ladies Open of Portugal
- Designed by: Ronald Fream and Nick Price
- Par: 72
- Length: 6,107 metres

Gramacho is a golf resort located to the east of Portimão in the Algarve region of Portugal. The resorts golf course was designed by Ronald Fream and Nick Price, and has hosted several prestigious tournaments, including the Ladies Open of Portugal on the Ladies European Tour.

== Golf course ==
=== Scorecard ===
| Hole | Par | Whites Length | Yellows Length | Reds Length |
|---|---|---|---|---|
| 1 | 4 | 338mt / 370yd | 317mt / 347yd | 275mt / 301yd |
| 2 | 5 | 512mt / 560yd | 476mt / 521yd | 426mt / 466yd |
| 3 | 4 | 339mt / 371yd | 309mt / 338yd | 284mt / 311yd |
| 4 | 3 | 186mt / 203yd | 162mt / 177yd | 115mt / 126yd |
| 5 | 4 | 365mt / 399yd | 342mt / 374yd | 308mt / 337yd |
| 6 | 5 | 475mt / 519yd | 416mt / 455yd | 358mt / 392yd |
| 7 | 3 | 179mt / 196yd | 153mt / 167yd | 126mt / 138yd |
| 8 | 4 | 289mt / 316yd | 263mt / 288yd | 206mt / 225yd |
| 9 | 4 | 366mt / 400yd | 314mt / 343yd | 264mt / 289yd |
| Out | 36 | 2732mt / 3334yd | 2752mt / 3010yd | 2362mt / 2583yd |
| 10 | 3 | 173mt / 189yd | 148mt / 162yd | 106mt / 116yd |
| 11 | 4 | 374mt / 409yd | 309mt / 338yd | 278mt / 304yd |
| 12 | 5 | 484mt / 529yd | 433mt / 474yd | 409mt / 447yd |
| 13 | 4 | 360mt / 394yd | 327mt / 358yd | 271mt / 296yd |
| 14 | 4 | 347mt / 379yd | 321mt / 351yd | 282mt / 308yd |
| 15 | 3 | 178mt / 195yd | 169mt / 185yd | 132mt / 144yd |
| 16 | 4 | 376mt / 411yd | 353mt / 386yd | 325mt / 355yd |
| 17 | 4 | 284mt / 311yd | 268mt / 293yd | 217mt / 237yd |
| 18 | 5 | 482mt / 527yd | 452mt / 494yd | 395mt / 432yd |
| In | 36 | 2732mt / 3344yd | 2780mt / 3040yd | 2415mt / 2641yd |
| Total | 72 | 6107mt / 6679yd | 5532mt / 6050yd | 4777mt / 5224yd |

== See also ==
- List of golf courses in Portugal
