= Davida (NGO) =

Brazilian NGO that supports sex workers

- Formation: 1992
- Type: NGO
- Purpose: support of sex workers
- Headquarters: Rio de Janeiro
- Region served: Brazil
- Website: http://www.davida.org.br/

Davida – Prostituição, Direitos Civis, Saúde (Prostitution, Civil Rights, Health) is an NGO that supports sex workers in Brazil. It was founded in 1992, is based in Rio de Janeiro, and gained international notoriety in 2005 when it launched the fashion line Daspu.

== Goals ==
Davida works in HIV/AIDS prevention and tries to improve the working conditions and the legal and societal status of prostitutes in Brazil. Its main aim is to end the discrimination of prostitutes and the recognition of prostitution as a regular profession. While prostitution itself is legal in Brazil, it is illegal to employ prostitutes.

== Founding and name ==
The organization was founded in 1992 by retired prostitute Gabriela Leite, who holds a degree in sociology, and her partner Flavio Lenz. In 1978 she had already organized a demonstration in São Paulo against police brutality, because of the murder of a prostitute friend. In 1987 she organized the first prostitution congress, a meeting of Brazilian prostitutes to create a network of sex worker initiatives. Gabriela Silva Leite died in 2013.

The name "Davida" refers to the phrase "Mulheres da Vida" ("women of life") commonly used for prostitutes in Brazil.

== Activities ==
Most of the members of Davida are (ex-)prostitutes. Some of them are being paid to distribute condoms and information material in the night scene of Rio. The organization is supported by the Brazilian Ministry of Health.

In 2002 pressure by Davida contributed to the Brazilian Ministry of Labor adding "sex worker" to an official list of occupations. In 2003 Davida supported the introduction of new legislation, based on the German model, that would have allowed prostitutes to sue for payment and would have legalized brothels. The law was not passed.

When officials moved to close hotels used by prostitutes and their customers in the historical center of Rio de Janeiro, Davida members met with the city government, performed songs at Praça Tiradentes, and were able to prevent the action.

Davida is at the center of a network of prostitute organizations all over Brazil, the Brazilian Prostitutes Network, with 20,000 members.

=== Daspu ===
Davida developed the idea of a fashion line to raise money after Brazil turned down $40 million in U.S. anti-AIDS funding in 2005 because a U.S. law required recipients to sign an explicit anti-prostitution pledge. The name "Daspu" abbreviates "das putas" ("from the whores") but is also a play on the name of the luxurious São Paulo fashion house "Daslu" (abbreviation of "from the Lu", "Lu" being the common nickname of the founders "Lúcia" and "Lourdes"). Daslu threatened to sue over the name but soon after was embroiled in a tax evasion scandal, leading to much free publicity for Daspu in Brazil.

The first Daspu designs, in November 2005, were t-shirts. During the week of Fashion Rio 2005, several Davida sex workers showed these at a catwalk show they had organized at Praça Tiradentes, where many of them did business. In March 2006, they hired the professional designer Rafaela Monteiro, whose work was reviewed and subject to approved by the Davida members. The designs often refer to prostitution in an ironic way, with phrases like "Lost Women are the Most Wanted", "Before the Show, Tune Your Instrument" and "We’re Bad, but We Could be Worse". The first collection, "on the piste", used motives from the world of truck drivers, the prostitutes' largest group of customers.

Daspu continued to hold several fashion shows in Rio and São Paulo, with prostitutes as models, and photos of Daspu models appeared in the Brazilian edition of Vogue. In November 2006, they performed at the São Paulo Art Biennial under the direction of the Slovenian artist Tadej Pogačar, culminating in the presentation of a wedding dress made from flophouse towels and condoms, worn by an HIV-positive prostitute.

Some pieces from Daspu were included in the catalog of a Paris fashion house, and the French lingerie designer Fifi Chachnil declared she will represent the line. In April 2008, members of Davida exhibited items in Milan that were created together with the Italian designer Antonio Cagianelli. Daspu presented its 2009 collection in parallel with São Paulo Fashion Week in June 2008.

While the sale of fashion does not yet create substantial net income for Daspu, a 2008 report by the Open Society Institute lauded the project for its innovative way of creating publicity and increasing public acceptance of sex work. Leite stated that the increased self-confidence of the participating women was a major benefit of the project.

=== Other publicity projects ===
Davida has also attempted to create publicity in other ways, with carnival parades, street serenades by 12 vocally trained prostitutes, and a theater play about AIDS, prostitutes and human rights. In July 2007 Davida released a book, As Meninas da Daspu ("The Daspu Girls"), featuring interviews with nine prostitutes. The book was introduced with a bikini show in a book store.

In April 2009, Gabriela Leite released her autobiography, titled Filha, Mãe, Avó e Puta ("Daughter, Mother, Grandmother and Slut"). In June 2010, it was announced that the book will be used as base for an upcoming film of the same title. Gabriela Leite will be portrayed by Vanessa Giácomo. The book was also transformed into a play starring Aléxia Dechamps.

Davida and the Daspu brand were also promoted by Glória Perez in the Brazilian soap opera Caminho das Índias.

== See also ==
- Prostitution in Brazil
