= Gabriela Leite =

Brazilian prostitute and sex workers' rights campaigner (1951-2013)

Gabriela Silva Leite
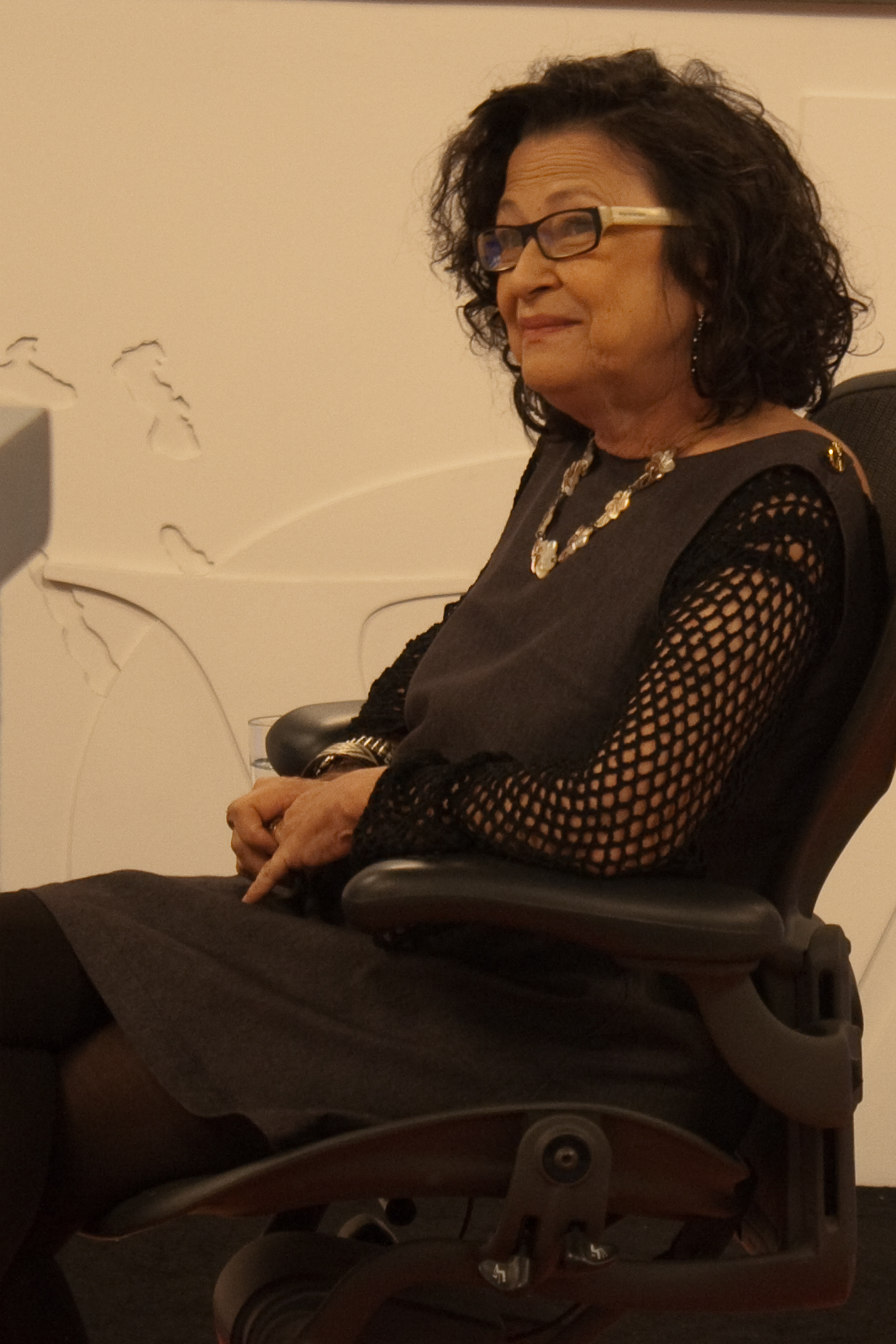
- Born: 22 April 1951; São Paulo, Brazil
- Died: 10 October 2013 (aged 62); Rio de Janeiro, Brazil
- Occupation: Prostitute
- Known for: Activism for rights of sex workers

Gabriela Silva Leite (1951 — 2013) was a Brazilian prostitute and activist in support of the rights of sex workers. She was the founder of the NGO, Davida, which derives its name from "Mulheres da Vida" (women of life), a term commonly used for prostitutes in Brazil, and of Daspu, a fashion brand for prostitutes.

== Early life ==
Leite was born in São Paulo on 22 April 1951. She came from a middle-class family, the daughter of a conservative housewife and a father who was a croupier. She studied social sciences at the University of São Paulo from 1969, but did not finish the course. In the late 1970s, she studied philosophy at the same university. Leite frequented the intellectual bohemian circles of São Paulo, before leaving that life and becoming a prostitute, which she has said was in search of her "personal revolution".

== Career ==
Leite worked as a prostitute in Boca do Lixo in São Paulo, in the bohemian zone of Belo Horizonte, and in the brothel area of Vila Mimosa in Rio de Janeiro.

== Activism ==
In 1979 in Boca do Lixo, Leite organized the first demonstration of prostitutes in Brazil, against police corruption and violence. In 1985 she was invited to develop her activism within the structure of an NGO, the Instituto de Estudos da Religião. In 1987, she participated in the organization of the first national meeting of prostitutes, together with Lourdes Barreto. The meeting attracted 70 prostitutes from most parts of Brazil and, from then, she was active in defending sex workers and in attempting to regulate the profession. After moving to Rio de Janeiro, she attended a meeting, organized by the politician Benedita da Silva for women from the favelas, where she made her first public speech. In 1992, she founded the NGO, Davida, which defends the rights of prostitutes, and seeks the regulation of the profession. It opposes the idea of treating sex workers as victims, whereby they are seen as only doing the work because they are poor.

Leite played a central role in organizing the fight against the HIV/AIDS epidemic in Brazil. In the late 1980s, she was invited to participate in the national HIV prevention program, Núcleo de Pesquisa em Prevenção ao Uso de Álcool e outras drogas (PREVINA). At the invitation of the ministry of health, she coordinated the production of the first manual on prevention of HIV/AIDS for prostitutes. Two years after the first national meeting of prostitutes, she organized a second national meeting focused on "AIDS and Prostitution", where the manual was validated by representatives of the government and sex workers alike.

In association with Davida, she created Daspu, a fashion label developed by and for prostitutes. The name was an ironic reference to the luxury fashion store Daslu, based in São Paulo. In 2010, she ran to be elected as a federal deputy for the Green Party (PV), with the slogan "a whore deputy", but was not elected. In 2009, she published a book entitled Filha, mãe, avó e puta (Daughter, Mother, Grandmother and Whore), in which she told her life story. In 2013 a short film was issued called Um Beijo para Gabriela (A Kiss for Gabriela), which traced her career.

== Death and legacy ==
Leite died in Rio de Janeiro on 10 October 2013, a victim of cancer.

She refused to be called an "ex-prostitute" when appearing in public, justifying this by the fact that she was still very active in the movement to defend the rights of prostitutes, through Davida and other organizations. One of her main achievements was the inclusion, in 2002, of the occupation of "sex worker" in the Brazilian Classification of Occupations (CBO), allowing prostitutes to register with the National Institute of Social Security (INSS) as self-employed and guarantee a pension. In 2012, federal deputy and gay-rights activist Jean Wyllys first presented the Gabriela Leite Bill to the National Congress, aiming to regulate the profession of prostitution and guarantee the labour rights of sex workers. This faced resistance in the predominantly conservative congress.

In 2013 a short film was issued called Um Beijo para Gabriela (A Kiss for Gabriela). In 2014, Leite's granddaughter, journalist Tatiany Leite, produced a documentary series called Filhas de Gabriela (Gabriela's children). These consisted of interviews with friends of Leite, prostitutes, activists, and Jean Wyllys.
