= Vale do Lobo =

Golf resort in Algarve, Portugal

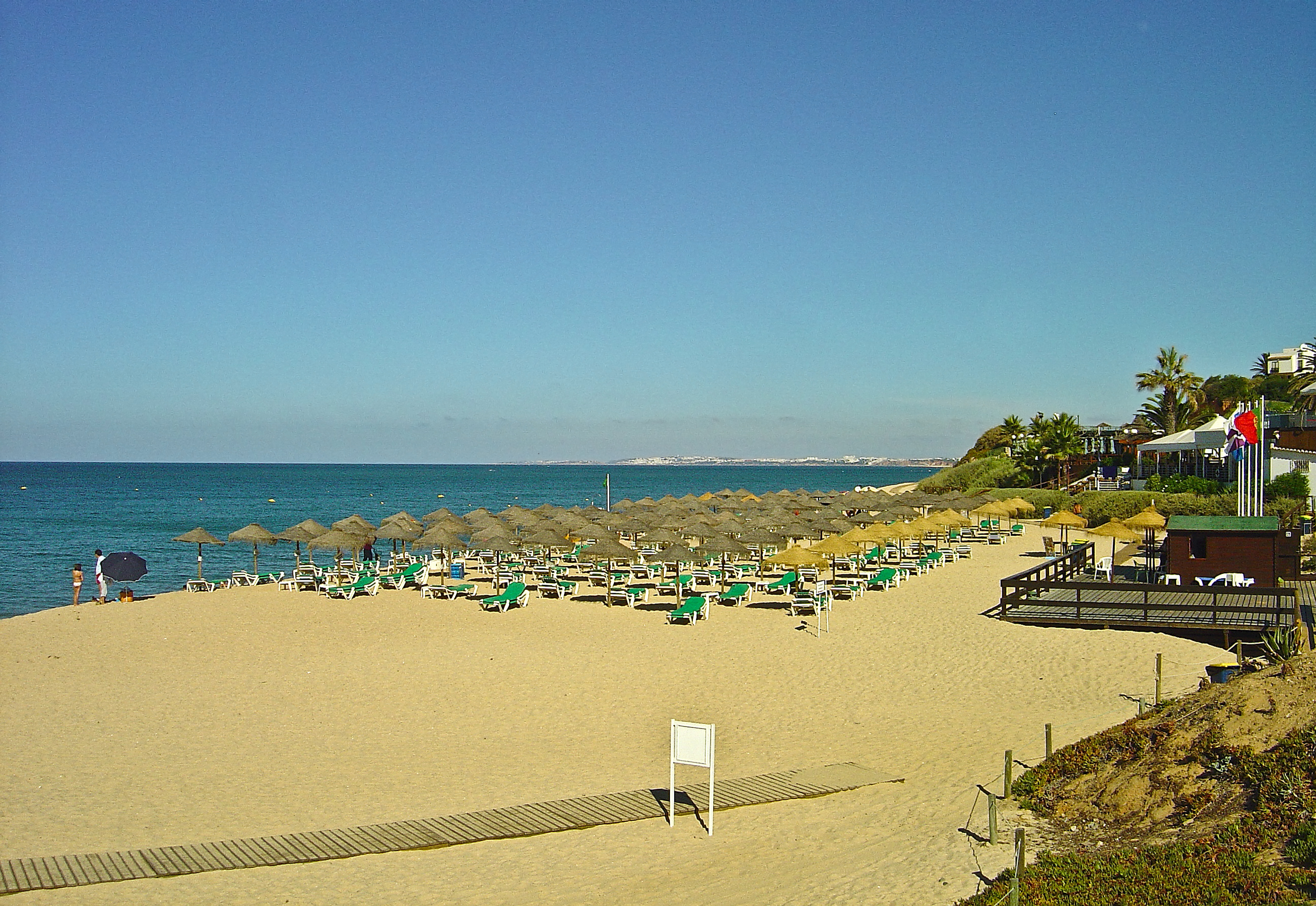
- Praia de Vale do Lobo

- Location in Portugal
- 37.055°N 8.064°W

Club information
- Location: Algarve, Portugal
- Established: 1968; 56 years ago
- Type: Private
- Tota holes: 36
- Tournaments: Portuguese Open (2002–03)
- Website: www.valedolobo.com

Royal Course
- Designed by: Rocky Roquemore
- Par: 72
- Length: 6,059 metres

Ocean Course
- Designed by: Sir Henry Cotton
- Par: 73
- Length: 6,137 metres

Vale do Lobo is a golf resort in the Algarve region of southern Portugal. Vale do Lobo comprises one of the three corners of the Golden Triangle of the Algarve's most affluent and expensive communities.

The community hosted the Portuguese Open, part of the PGA European Tour, in 2002 and 2003.

== History ==
Vale do Lobo was among the first tourist resorts to be built in Portugal, having been catalysed by the Estado Novo's decision in 1962 to build Faro Airport following the success in the 1950s of luxury Spanish resorts such as Torremolinos. In 1962, Trust House Forte acquired the land, which became Vale do Lobo, with the intention of turning it into a luxury resort. At the time, the region was a stone pine forest with a sand beach. Townhouses and villas were built for tourists and permanent foreign residents. An 18-hole golf course designed by Henry Cotton was built, and Vale do Lobo quickly became a popular destination with the British market. In 1968, Trust House Forte and Costain Group opened the first five-star hotel in the Algarve, the Dona Filipa, named after Philippa of Lancaster, whose marriage to John I of Portugal confirmed the 700-year-old Anglo-Portuguese Alliance.

In 1977, the Venlo-born Dutch entrepreneur Sander van Gelder acquired the resort out of receivership after it had struggled financially following the 1974 Carnation Revolution. He had originally intended to acquire just a small plot of land in the area but ended up taking the opportunity to acquire the whole resort. The resort was run under van Gelder's ownership for the next thirty years, adding another eighteen-hole golf course and many facilities, including bars, restaurants and shops. The resort hosted the Portuguese Open in 2002 and 2003.

In 2006, a combination of Portuguese and international investors, together with the Portuguese state-owned bank Caixa Geral de Depósitos, acquired the development from van Gelder, installing Diogo Gaspar Ferreira as CEO. Over the next four years, the consortium took out twelve loans to further develop the resort for a total new debt of 249 million euros. By the summer of 2015, all of these loans were in arrearage. Because five of these loans were from Caixa, at a time when Armando Vara was the bank's administrator, they were investigated as part of Operation Marquis, and figured in the charges against José Sócrates and other Operation Marquis defendants.

== Golf Courses ==
=== Royal Course ===
Vale do Lobo Royal Course (meters)
Tee	Rating/Slope	1	2	3	4	5	6	7	8	9	Out	10	11	12	13	14	15	16	17	18	In	Total
Pro	72.7 / 133	394	287	383	313	463	395	156	388	148	2927	326	494	331	352	360	303	224	366	322	3078	6005
Reg	70.7 / 129	360	261	370	288	450	375	126	365	133	2728	315	473	299	341	327	282	190	346	295	2868	5596
Ladies	71.6 / 129	317	264	309	230	371	336	101	296	102	2326	262	408	259	311	312	251	133	284	260	2480	4806
Par		5	4	4	4	5	4	3	4	3	36	4	5	4	4	4	4	3	4	4	36	72
SI		15	13	3	11	7	1	17	5	9		16	2	12	4	6	18	10	8	14

Vale do Lobo Royal Course (yards)
Tee	Rating/Slope	1	2	3	4	5	6	7	8	9	Out	10	11	12	13	14	15	16	17	18	In	Total
Pro	72.7 / 133	431	314	419	342	506	432	171	424	162	3201	357	540	362	385	394	331	245	400	352	3366	6567
Reg	70.7 / 129	394	285	405	315	492	410	138	399	145	2983	344	517	327	373	358	308	208	378	323	3136	6120
Ladies	71.6 / 129	347	289	338	252	406	367	110	324	112	2544	287	446	283	340	341	274	145	311	284	2712	5256
Par		5	4	4	4	5	4	3	4	3	36	4	5	4	4	4	4	3	4	4	36	72
SI		15	13	3	11	7	1	17	5	9		16	2	12	4	6	18	10	8	14

=== Ocean Course ===
Vale do Lobo Ocean Course (meters)
Tee	Rating/Slope	1	2	3	4	5	6	7	8	9	Out	10	11	12	13	14	15	16	17	18	In	Total
Pro	74.1 / 140	429	349	497	381	192	416	171	385	347	3167	436	413	378	144	346	195	483	144	416	2955	6122
Reg	71.5 / 135	399	279	457	339	163	410	166	374	326	2913	425	386	283	135	344	178	429	135	367	2682	5595
Ladies	73.7 / 134	359	251	409	257	140	358	149	305	304	2532	413	355	265	101	332	137	404	126	340	2473	5005
Par		4	4	5	4	3	5	3	5	4	37	5	4	4	3	4	3	5	3	5	36	73
SI		5	13	1	7	17	9	15	11	3		10	2	6	18	8	12	4	16	14

Vale do Lobo Ocean Course (yards)
Tee	Rating/Slope	1	2	3	4	5	6	7	8	9	Out	10	11	12	13	14	15	16	17	18	In	Total
Pro	74.1 / 140	469	382	544	417	210	455	187	421	379	3463	477	452	413	157	378	213	528	157	455	3232	6695
Reg	71.5 / 135	436	305	500	371	178	448	182	409	357	3186	465	422	309	148	376	195	469	148	401	2933	6119
Ladies	73.7 / 134	393	274	447	281	153	392	163	334	332	2769	452	388	290	110	363	150	442	138	372	2705	5474
Par		4	4	5	4	3	5	3	5	4	37	5	4	4	3	4	3	5	3	5	36	73
SI		5	13	1	7	17	9	15	11	3		10	2	6	18	8	12	4	16	14

== See also ==
- List of golf courses in Portugal
