= Migrant sex work =

Sex work carried out by migrant workers

Migrant sex work is sex work done by migrant workers. It is significant because of its role as a dominant demographic of sex work internationally. It has common features across various contexts, such as migration from rural to urban areas and from developing nations to industrialized nations, and the economic factors that help to determine migrant status. Migrant sex workers have also been the subject of discussions concerning the legality of sex work, its connection to sex trafficking, and the views of national governments and non-governmental organizations about the regulation of sex work and the provision of services for victims of sex trafficking.

== Demographics and background ==
The illegal nature of migrant sex work makes it difficult to obtain reliable and conclusive estimates of migrant sex workers. However, social scientists have discovered significant trends regarding the identity of migrant sex workers. While migrants who work in agriculture or construction are largely male, migrants who engage in commercial sex work are largely female with ages ranging from the early teens to middle age. Migrant sex workers make up significant proportions of the sex worker population in many countries, with estimates ranging from 37% in the UK to 90% in Spain.

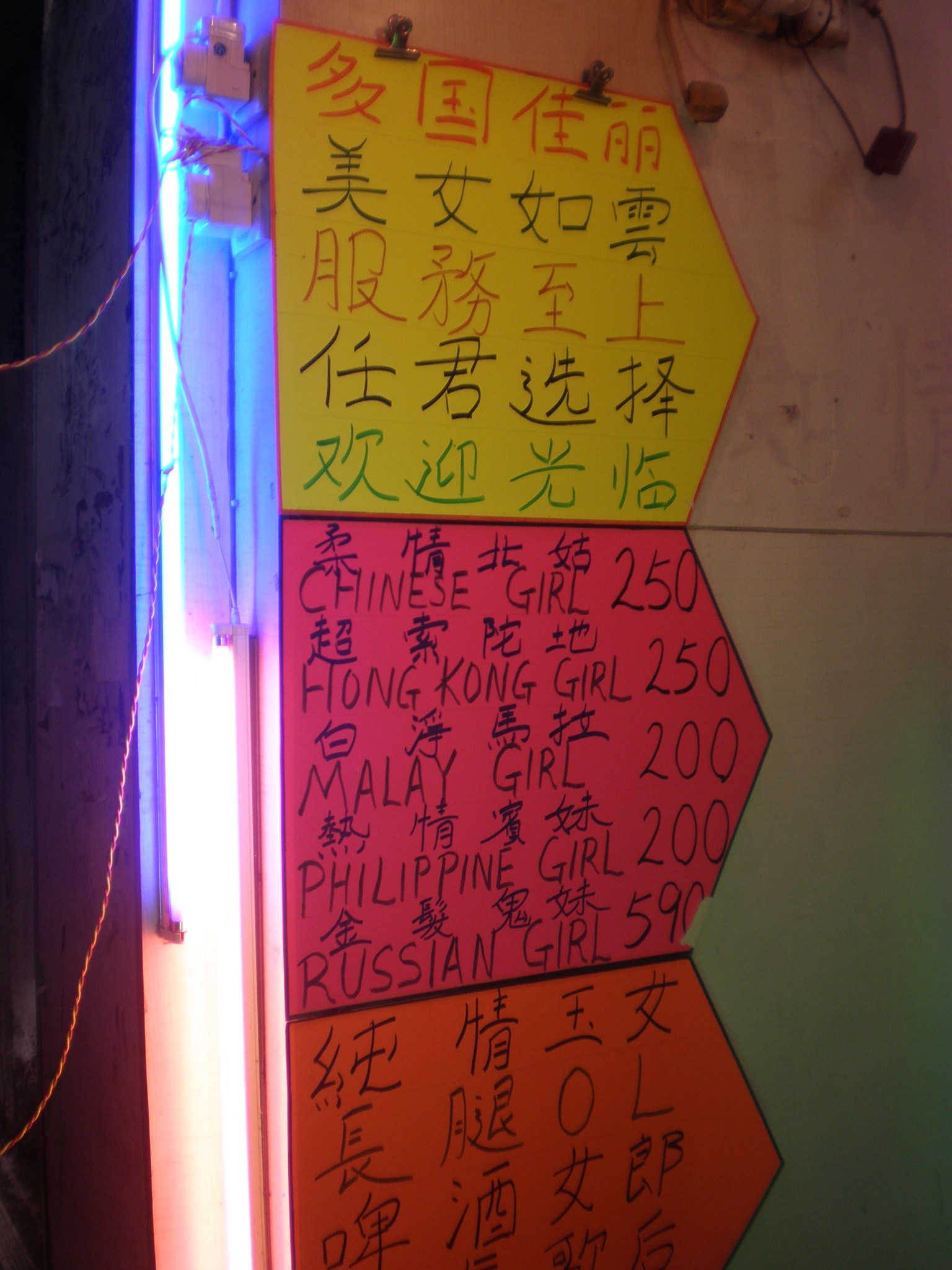
Brothel price sign for sex workers of various nationalities on Soy Street, Hong Kong

Migrant sex workers are diverse in terms of nationality of origin. In certain national contexts, such as in the United Arab Emirates, sex workers come from a diverse range of nations of origin, such as Russia, Nigeria, and Thailand. About 60% of sex workers in large Dutch cities, for instance, are women of color from developing nations. As a result, what distinguishes migrant sex workers from local sex workers are primarily their low socioeconomic status, primarily illegal immigration status, and poor language skills. This results in their frequent marginalization in the unregulated and dangerous sectors of the sex industry.

=== Reasons for migration and sex work ===
==== Reasons for migration ====
Low economic status and harsh living conditions in migrant sex workers' home country often serve as push factors for migration to more economically advantaged nations. Vast migration between third and first world countries in response to diminishing economic prospects at home has been prevalent since economic globalization widened the income gap between developed and developing nations. As a result, the number of international migrants doubled between 1960 and 2005. This international migration has increasingly become feminized, with females making up 50% of all international migrants.

==== Reasons for sex work ====
Migrants enter sex work for a variety of reasons. Female migrants largely migrate for jobs in the care sector, such as domestic work, childcare, and sex work, as opposed to males who engage in more physically demanding labor, such as construction and agriculture. Some migrants may have originally intended to work in commercial sex while others found themselves turning to commercial sex after alternate labor means failed or proved to be less lucrative. Others may engage in sex work as a result of situations involving the need to pay off debts incurred during migration or fees to a wide variety of middlemen who may help secure papers, travel passage, and places of work.

For women who engage in rural to urban migration in developing nations with growing free-trade zones and importation of foreign financial capital and tourism, sex work is often more lucrative than alternative forms of labor, such as working in manufacturing or in factories subcontracting to foreign corporations. Women can choose to engage in commercial sex over these forms of labor, or use sex work to supplement other labor activities, such as domestic work.

== Problems in data and research ==
Several scholars have noted the growing number of academic studies, news media coverage, and government and NGO reports on migrant sex workers, victims of sex trafficking, and the overlap between these two groups. As the perception of an international sex trafficking pandemic grows, there have been a large number of attempts to count the number of individuals who engage in some sort of migration and sex work, either voluntarily or coerced. However, scholars and activists have often criticized the methodologies of these studies and the motivations behind them.

=== Conflation of sex work and sex trafficking ===
Because prostitution can be an extremely political topic that represents differing political interests, the method of data collection and the use of collected data can vary in reliability. While more pro-sex work academics, organizations, and activists make an explicit demarcation between sex workers and victims of sex trafficking, many other groups consider prostitution to inherently lack a voluntary component. Many anti-sex work activists consider any form of migration for the purpose of commercial sex to be a form of human trafficking. As a result, depending on the definition of human trafficking by the organization or data collector, the number of either migrant sex workers or victims of sex trafficking can dramatically change depending on whether or not these two categories of individuals are conflated. Scholars, service providers, and practitioners who attempt to remain apolitical and outside the feminist views on sex trafficking and sex work regarding prostitution still often remark how the legal definitions of human trafficking are still too vague for them to efficiently and neutrally define and count victims. As a result, who is considered to be a migrant sex worker or victim of sex trafficking can widely vary.

=== Illegality of sex work ===
The illegal nature of either the migration, sex work, or both components of migrant sex work make it difficult to obtain reliable and conclusive estimates of migrant sex workers. Scholars Guri Tyldum and Anette Brunovski call sex workers "hidden populations" which they define as "A group of individuals for whom the size and boundaries are unknown, and for whom no sampling frame exists." The reasons why a sampling frame does not exist lies in the illegal and stigmatized nature of sex work. In order to protect their identity from law enforcement and family members, sex workers are often unwilling to participate in studies and surveys that may compromise their privacy and identity.

=== Diversity in migrant sex work ===
Migrant sex work is also incredibly diverse due to the large number of countries and migration contexts that are involved. There is no statistically generalizable portrait of migrant sex workers' day-to-day lives, living and working conditions, and relationships with other sex workers, clients, or third party intermediaries. Studies are unlikely to capture the sheer diversity in migrant sex worker experiences, especially when many of them come from selective samples, such as from a sex worker service provider or even shelter for human trafficking victims. As a result, many scholars caution against accepting any survey or study of sex workers as generalizable.

== Relationship with human trafficking ==
=== Risk of human trafficking ===
Because of their illegal and vulnerable economic status, some migrant sex workers may find themselves in situations where coercion and forced sex work may be present. Under international legal definitions of human trafficking, forced and coercive forms of sex work are considered to be instances of involuntary sex trafficking. However, many scholars caution against categorizing sex workers as either completely voluntary or completely involuntary. They often argue that sex work, like other forms of labor, can span a spectrum between the two extremes, with most circumstances falling in the middle through various labor rights violations. Nevertheless, the vulnerability of migrant sex workers can make them susceptible to exploitative or coercive labor practices that can resemble or be human trafficking.

=== Conflation with human trafficking ===
Whether or not human trafficking and migrant sex work should be considered the same concept has been a contentious debate among feminist activists, government officials, scholars, and religious organizations for the past 20 years. This debate currently dominates much of the public discussion surrounding human trafficking and sex work. On one side of the debate are anti-prostitution activists who conflate migrant sex work and human trafficking because they do not believe in voluntary prostitution or because they view any migration for the purpose of sex work as human trafficking. This perspective has largely dominated mainstream governmental and NGO perspectives toward human trafficking across international contexts. On the other side of the debate are pro-sex worker rights academics and activists who argue for the separation of voluntary migrant sex work from involuntary human trafficking and a greater focus on labor and migration rights instead of trafficking. This group works for the recognition of the right of women to pursue sex work as a legitimate form of work, more flexible and open borders for migrants, and a greater focus on the spectrum of coercive labor conditions.

Sex work and sex trafficking conflation is also a heavily debated legal topic. Several scholars argue that existing legal provisions aimed at combating human trafficking, such as the U.S. Trafficking Victims Protection Act and the 2000 United Nations Protocol to Prevent, Suppress and Punish Trafficking in Persons, especially Women and Children, do not adequately account for the variety of sex worker conditions and contexts, voluntary or involuntary. For instance, Filipina hostesses who migrate to Japan to work as entertainers must give up their legal documents to their recruiters during the migration process. While the law considers the process of giving up a passport to a third party intermediary as a condition of human trafficking, several scholars, activists, and the sex workers themselves do not regard this to be human trafficking, particularly when individuals consent to this component of the migration process.

Issues surrounding the definition of human trafficking in relation to sex work and migration situations have contributed to a highly contentious debate and has played a prominent role in structuring how governments have responded to migrant sex workers in terms of viewing them as unwilling victims of a crime or as criminals themselves.

== Legal issues ==
=== Migration and legal status ===
Many migrant sex workers migrate illegally or become illegal migrants after leaving previously legal statuses and jobs for sex work. Illegal migrant status can heavily restrict sex worker access to legal alternatives to sex work, legal sex work venues, and government-provided social services. The consequences are that migrant sex workers are unable to turn to law enforcement during sexual assaults and rapes or access services available to sex workers with appropriate legal status and citizenship. The possibility of facing deportation and anti-immigration sentiments are critical ways in which migrant sex workers are marginalized. Migrant workers who initially migrate under legal means can become illegal migrants in violation of their visas if they decide to enter sex work.

Migrant sex workers who have legal status largely do not exist for two reasons. First, governments with legal sex industries typically do not allow foreign nationals to participate legally. New Zealand and Australia are two examples that prohibit foreign individuals with various visa statuses from participating in sex work, making individuals who choose to do so anyway illegal under immigration law. Second, governments that do not have legal sex industries typically allow the entrance of foreign nationals who are currently working as prostitutes or have a history of prostitution.

=== Legality of sex work ===
Decriminalization - No criminal penalties for prostitution Legalization -prostitution legal and regulated Abolitionism - prostitution is legal, but organized activities such as brothels and pimping are illegal; prostitution is not regulated Neo-abolitionism illegal to buy sex and for 3rd party involvement, legal to sell sex Prohibitionism - prostitution illegal Legality varies with local laws

The legal status of sex work varies in various different national contexts around the world. Scholar Janie Chuang identifies the following four regulatory models for prostitution:

- Complete criminalization: Prohibition of prostitution for all parties (prostitute, clients, and pimps)
- Partial criminalization: Prohibition of prostitution for all parties, except for prostitutes. This is popularly known as the Swedish Model which does not criminalize the prostitute, but rather targets the clients and pimps.
- Decriminalization: Does not consider prostitution a crime. Law enforcement is only involved when acts under criminal law occur.
- Legalization: Active regulation of prostitution through licensing, zoning, and mandatory health measures.

Proponents of legalizing prostitution often argue that legalization will provide regulation and benefits to an industry that suffers from negative externalities as a direct result of its illegal status, such as the inability of sex workers to seek legal action towards violent customers or exploitative labor conditions. Proponents for partial criminalization argue that making the act of buying sex, as opposed to selling sex, illegal will eliminate unequal penalties that are traditionally felt by the sex worker, especially when the sex worker is not voluntarily participating in commercial sex.

However, legalization of sex work does not mean all sex workers benefit. Even in situations where sex work is decriminalized and legalized, such as in Denmark, the migrant sex worker population is often negatively affected. In the Netherlands, where sex work is legalized, the legal benefits are largely accrued only by sex workers who have legal status or Dutch citizenship. As a result, the illegal migrant sex worker population that comprises 50%-60% of the overall sex worker population does not have access to licensed and regulated establishments and find themselves pushed into illegal and potentially dangerous sectors of sex work.

== Responses to migration and sex work ==
=== Government response ===
National governments have responded to migrant sex work similarly to the way they have responded to mass migration. Anti-immigration sentiments have flared in many receiving countries of mass migration, such as the United States. and various European countries, such as France. Along with these negative sentiments are negative attitudes directed at migrants who engage in sex work, with concerns over sex work's relationship with transnational organized crime, sexually transmitted diseases, and lower moral standards. States have responded by tightening their borders and deporting migrant sex workers.

State response may differ based on anti-human trafficking attitudes that often prevail. Some states treat migrant sex workers differently if they are considered to be victims of human trafficking and not voluntary sex workers. Some governments, such as that of the United States, provide legal and health services to individuals who engage in commercial sex if these individuals are proven and officially certified by law enforcement to be victims of human trafficking.

=== NGO response ===
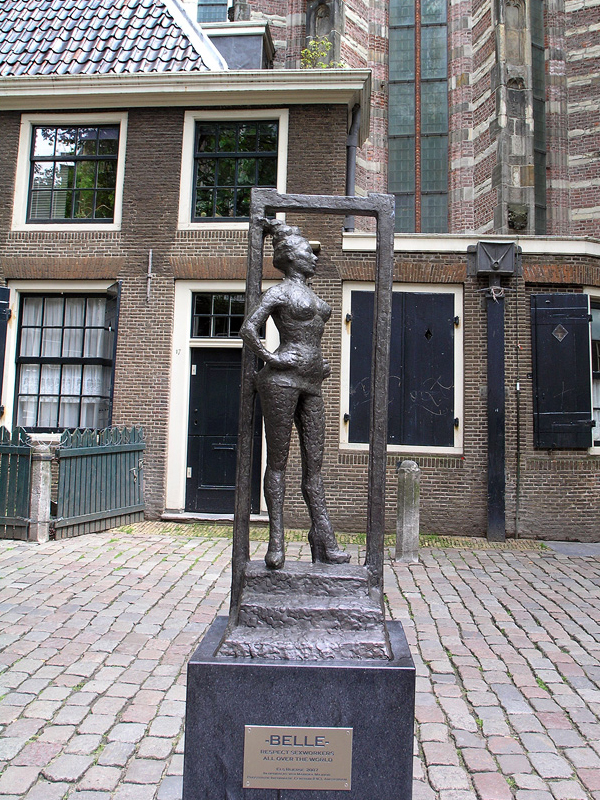
Bronze statue Belle by Els Rijerse in De Wallen, the largest and best known red-light district in Amsterdam. Inscription says "Respect sex workers all over the world."

Response from non-governmental organizations have largely been centered on anti-trafficking activism and service provision that may also include migrant sex workers. Much of NGO response to migrant sex work has been on increasing awareness of human trafficking problems. Anti-trafficking NGOs have played a role in providing health services and contraceptives. Sex worker outreach organizations also exist in the areas of public and global health. NGOs also largely target migrant sex workers for their high risk of attracting and passing on sexually transmitted diseases. They offer services such as providing contraception in the form of condoms, engaging sex workers in educational classes concerning sexual and other forms of physical health, and providing HIV and other STD testing.

In some contexts, such as the United States, NGOs have played a role in facilitating irregular migrants' access to legal status and eventually permanent residency or citizenship. However, these legal benefits are often only available for individuals who can prove their involvement in commercial sex work was involuntary and a form of human trafficking victimhood. On the other hand, some NGO-run campaigns encourage migrant sex workers to return to their nations of origin.

The existence of anti-human trafficking NGOs has also been spurred by the United States Office to Monitor and Combat Trafficking in Persons' Trafficking In Persons Report. A prominent component of the TIP Report ranking of countries's response to human trafficking is their involvement and encouragement of civil society and non-governmental efforts at combating human trafficking.

==== Advocates for the rights of migrant sex workers ====
There have also been organizations that explicitly support the rights of migrant sex workers, many of which are sex worker rights groups, as well as human rights, migrant rights, LGBT rights organisations, UN agencies and academics. These groups primarily argue for the recognition of sex work as a legitimate form of work and for the rights and legal status of migrant workers. Many of these NGOs advocate for more humane migration policies that would not harm migrant sex workers and the risks that accompany illegal status. Such groups include the Global Network of Sex Work Projects, Global Alliance Against Traffic in Women, International Union of Sex Workers, and The International Committee on the Rights of Sex Workers in Europe.

=== United States influence on responses to migrant sex work ===
==== Trafficking in Persons Report ====
The United States Department of State exerts significant influence on the migration and human trafficking policies of foreign government through the Office to Monitor and Combat Trafficking in Persons. The Office to Monitor and Combat Trafficking in Persons releases an annual Trafficking In Persons Report that rates all countries based on their response and action regarding human trafficking within and between their borders. Their ratings are based on whether or not a government is deemed compliant with U.S. minimum standards for response to human trafficking, which are articulated in the Trafficking Victims Protection Act. According to the U.S. Department of State, countries are rated on the following standards

- Tier 1 Countries whose governments fully comply with the Trafficking Victims Protection Act's (TVPA) minimum standards.
- Tier 2 Countries whose governments do not fully comply with the TVPA's minimum standards, but are making significant efforts to bring themselves into compliance with those standards.
- Tier 2 Watchlist Countries whose governments do not fully comply with the TVPA's minimum standards, but are making significant efforts to bring themselves into compliance with those standards
- Tier 3 Countries whose governments do not fully comply with the minimum standards and are not making significant efforts to do so. A Tier 3 ranking can result in significant sanctions from the U.S. government, such as opposition to assistance from international financial assistance institutions and the withdrawal of non-humanitarian aid.

Central to the U.S. Department of State understanding and discussion of human trafficking involves the international flow of migration, as well as its Christian-conservative position on sex work. According to the Department of State, "Although not all trafficking involves migration, and not all migration is human trafficking, the vulnerabilities of migrants make them a tempting target for traffickers." Countries' responses towards migrant workers' conditions of vulnerability therefore play a pivotal role in their Trafficking in Persons Report ranking.

National governments respond to Tier 3 and Tier 2 Watchlist rankings and the potential consequence of sanctions in a variety of ways. These responses also differ in their effects on migrant sex workers. Many countries respond by placing more restrictive immigration standards or greater migration regulations, all for the purpose of seemingly improving state response to human trafficking risks that may accompany open borders. However, the effects of these new regulations have been mixed when it comes to the actual well-being of migrant sex workers. For example, South Korea, after their Tier 3 ranking in the 2001 TIP, launched an in-depth national survey to examine the conditions of their foreign sex workers. At the head of this new effort, however, was a government minister who had previously sought to abolish prostitution. The result was a national law that outlawed the role of third-party migration intermediaries who played an important role in facilitating the migration process of women into South Korea.

==== Anti-prostitution pledge ====
In 2003, the US Congress under the Bush Administration announced the President's Emergency Plan for AIDS Relief (PEPFAR), a commitment of $15 billion over five years (2003–2008) from United States to internationally fight the HIV/AIDS. In an effort to combat human trafficking and the supposed role of sex trafficking in spreading HIV/AIDS, the legislation explicitly opposes any efforts that do not conflate prostitution and sex trafficking:

- "No funds [...] may be used to promote or advocate the legalization or practice of prostitution or sex trafficking."
- "No funds [...] may be used to provide assistance to any group or organization that does not have a policy explicitly opposing prostitution and sex trafficking."
- nothing in the anti-prostitution clause "shall be construed to preclude" services to prostitutes, including testing, care and prevention services, including condoms.

Within PEPFAR lies the anti-prostitution pledge, a pledge NGOs and governments, with few exceptions, must sign declaring their opposition to prostitution or service provision to prostitutes. This pledge has been heavily criticized by NGOs working to fight HIV/AIDS, sex worker rights activists and organizations, and even national governments who understand that a declaration of opposition towards prostitution would be counterproductive to eliminating HIV/AIDS among a vulnerable population. This pledge and its requirement of opposition to prostitution has affected the funding of many organizations working explicitly with migrant sex workers by eliminating many of their social services and increasing their risk of abuse and limited mobility.

== Case studies ==
=== The Netherlands and Sweden ===
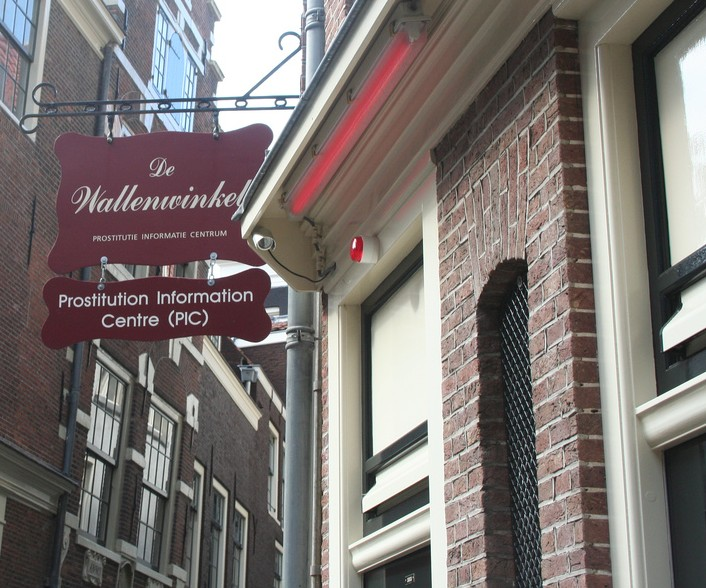
Prostitution Info Center in Amsterdam

Countries within the European Union have varied legal statuses for prostitution and sex work. Two European nations have served as representative examples of the two popularly debated legal responses to prostitution: Sweden's model of criminalizing the purchase of sex, but not the act of selling it; and the Netherlands' model of legalizing and regulating sex work. Some pro-sex worker rights advocates argue that the Dutch model of legalization and regulation is the most beneficial for the labor standards and working conditions of sex workers, while many anti-sex work activists argue that the Swedish Model helps eliminate unfair criminalization of prostitutes instead of the janes, johns and pimps who exploit them. Criminalizing clients and pimps additionally avoids prosecuting prostitutes who are, to them, victims of human trafficking.

However, many scholars argue that neither of these models have had dramatically different results in the status of sex workers or trafficking victims. Rather, both models have only deepened the dangers of sex work for vulnerable groups that engage in sex work, primarily socioeconomically disadvantaged migrant workers. Criminalization of buyers of sex work has created more dangerous situations for individuals who continue to engage in commercial sex. Often, they can no longer conduct transactions in public spaces because their clients fear arrest and legal action. As a result, sex work is less susceptible to outreach, and migrants who fear legal repercussions themselves for their legal statuses are unwilling to be involved in situations that may involve law enforcement or service provision.

Under the Dutch Model, these legal benefits and reduction of risk are not available to migrant sex workers who are largely illegal. Regulated and legalized sex work requires the registration of brothels, mandated health testing for sex workers, and various other regulations for indoor working spaces and the procurement of clients. As a result, illegal migrant workers who fear deportment over their legal status cannot participate in the formal paperwork associated with legal sex work. They continue to become marginalized from more privileged sex workers.

=== Dubai, United Arab Emirates ===
The United Arab Emirates's geographic location makes it an important stepping stone for migrants from the Middle East, Africa, Eastern Europe, and Southeast Asia who wish to eventually work in Europe or the United States. The UAE's economic boom and aggressive development in the early to mid 2000s made it not only attractive to foreign migrants, but also dependent on them. In Dubai, migrants make up almost 90% of the population. While this migrant population is very diverse in terms of nation of origin, the population is divided into mainly two key demographics: poor, vulnerable laborers who come to Dubai through restrictive labor contracts; and rich, Western businessmen and financiers. Both populations contribute to Dubai and the greater UAE in very different yet very important ways. While the more privileged Western migrants contribute financial capital to the development of the city, the poor migrants contribute much of the physical labor necessary to build the city's physical structures.

Along with demand for migrant laborers was also the demand for migrant sex workers. Because of the diversity in the demographics of individuals who live and work in Dubai, a highly diverse and stratified commercial sex industry also exists to cater to these diversities in background, income, and class. For example, the spectrum of sex worker diversity ranges from migrants from Nigeria, Iran, Philippines, and Russia, with their skin tone corresponding to the price they command and the male clientele they see: the lighter the sex worker's skin color, the more Western the clientele and the higher the price. As a result, the UAE's migrant sex worker population is highly diverse and burgeoning. However, because the UAE has banned prostitution, these sex workers remain largely underground, illegal, and in constant fear of law enforcement intervention and the possibility of deportation.

Because of the UAE's large migrant worker population, restrictive labor contracts, and lack of anti-trafficking partnerships with NGOs, the United States Department of State Trafficking In Persons Report gave UAE a series of Tier 3 and Tier 2 Watchlist rankings. As a result, the UAE allowed more local and international NGO presence to develop, including those working to end human trafficking and sex trafficking.

=== Canada ===
Canada has emerged as an important country for migrant sex work. Canada has seen a significant influx of migrant sex workers because of the notion that the West is seen as a mecca of opportunity. Furthermore, Canada is a rich nation and some women envision themselves becoming citizens one day. Many women from different parts of Asia, especially Thai women, started migrating to Canada because of the labor flow and migration policies. Also, migration reforms in parts of Europe have made it harder for people to stay for an extended period of time.

In the 90s, Canada started to become more cognizant of migrant sex workers. During this time there was national debate over whether the work should be viewed as prostitution or as a labor force. There are two perspectives taken when dealing with prostitution, which are treating women as victims of trafficking or as women who are acting on their own free will. According to Leslie Jeffrey, the Canadian government does an inadequate job of regulating prostitution. The blame for the issue falls on women rather than men who are buying the services. Jeffrey also points to studies done about Thai and Chinese women indicating they are not being coerced to work in Canada. The Canadian government over time has initiated different preventive legislation to make migrant sex work more difficult to find. Acts such as PCEPA make it harder for women to be directly soliciting for sex. Additionally, with the passage of C-36 there would be $20 million allocated to assist individuals trying to leave prostitution. This statute made it harder for women to get clients and jobs had to be done in secrecy. McIntyre asserts that because of these types of laws migrant workers who are deported put women more at risk to encounter poverty and abuse in their home country.

Different parts of Canada have different problems which cause women to deal with acts of violence. In particular, many women experience violence with this career which often does not get reported. In Toronto, many women did not report violence, but in Vancouver women were more likely to report acts of sexual assault.

== See also ==
- Human migration
- Feminization of migration
- Karayuki-san
- Globalization
- Prostitution
- Laura María Agustín
