= Human trafficking in LGBTQ communities =

Human trafficking

The United Nations defines human trafficking as "the recruitment, transport, transfer, harbouring or receipt of a person by such means as threat or use of force or other forms of coercion." Declared a global human rights crisis, human trafficking is the third-largest source of worldwide criminal activity. Although the UN has developed a range of methods to collect reliable data regarding human trafficking, uniform information is scarce. According to the Walk Free Foundation, 40.3 million people live in modern slavery. Whereas, according to the U.S. Department of State, this number is closer to 24.9 million.

Because of the absence of a standard definition of human trafficking across agencies and countries and the hidden nature of the crime, there are gaps in data and challenges to identify victims. These gaps are visible when looking at data regarding the LGBTQI+ community. Although recent studies have shown that individuals who identify with the community are especially vulnerable to human trafficking due to the stigma and discrimination against them, there is very little data making them an underreported population. The limited amount of data available on LGBTQI+ and trafficking has come from North America and, to a lesser extent, Europe and Latin America.

== Risk Factors & Vulnerabilities ==
In most cases of trafficking, traffickers prey on individuals or groups of people more susceptible and easier to exploit. Risk factors that can increase vulnerability can be societal or personal, such as political instability, poverty, and poor mental health. Young adults and children who identify as LGBTQI+ are considered particularly vulnerable to human trafficking due to marginalization within communities. Stigma and discrimination against LGBTQI+ are highly prevalent in many parts of the world. According to statistics from Human Dignity Trust, 71 countries worldwide continue to criminalize same-sex relationships, 11 jurisdictions impose the death penalty for same-sex relationships, and 15 criminalize the expression of transgender people. Criminalization against those who identify with other sexual orientations and gender identities not only increases societal stigma and vulnerability but also prevents victims of trafficking from seeking out help and reporting their victimization as they are labeled as criminals. This is added to the already less likelihood of trafficking being reported due to the hidden nature of the crime and the sexual stigma.

Along with criminalization, LGBTQI+ youth disproportionately experience harassment, homelessness, food insecurity, economic instability, and interaction with the foster care system. For example, in North America, although less than 5% of the population identifies as LGBTQI+, up to 40% of homeless youth identify as LGBTQ+. According to Polaris Project, of this number, 46% ran away due to family rejection and 7.4x more likely to experience sexual violence. Because these youths face higher rates of bullying and violence from family and peers due to homophobia and transphobia, they are more likely to be runaways, homeless, and partake in the street economy to survive. Additionally, a report by the Urban Institute in 2015 shows that many youths report negative experiences with social service systems that failed to meet their need for safe housing, reliable income, and adequate mental and physical care. In many cases, institutions, including the criminal and welfare system, neglect and mistreat individuals, sometimes even rejecting to help, which increases their susceptibility to trauma and human trafficking. For example, LGBTQIA+ youth are 3x more likely than heterosexual youth to be placed in foster care, yet 50% have reported feeling safer on the streets than in foster homes. Additionally, among youth involved in sex trafficking, 63% have previously been involved in the child welfare system and are disproportionately LGBTQI+.

Due to individual-leveled abuse and systemic abuse, LGBTQ+ youths have a greater risk of mental health and substance abuse disorders. Researchers coined the term 'minority stress' to describe how stigma, discrimination, and prejudice can create a stressful social environment to lead to mental health problems. In addition, these individuals are also at a greater risk to experience various traumas, including identity trauma, historical trauma, and internalized oppression. Transgender and nonbinary children, in particular, can come to internalize the commodification of their bodies as an option for survival, given the lack of legal and economical options. These traumas experienced can dramatically impact brain development and psychopathological outcomes, making it easier to accept traffickers' offers of false love, pseudo families, or basic needs.

== Trafficking ==
Sex trafficking is a form of human trafficking or modern slavery that uses violence, threats, lies, and other methods to compel an individual to engage in commercial sex. Under U.S. federal law, anyone under 18 years old who participates in commercial sex is a victim of sex trafficking, despite whether the trafficker used force, fraud, or coercion. LGBTQI+ youths are more vulnerable to this type of trafficking because traffickers frequently target minors due to their susceptibility and lack of protection; along with being a part of a marginalized community, they usually have a weak support network, poor mental health, and are economically unstable. As a result, homeless LGBTQI+ youths are increasingly at risk of sexual exploitation compared to their heterosexual peers. Of the 40% of homeless youth who identify as LGBTQ, according to Polaris Project, these youths are 3-7x more likely than their peers to engage in survival sex for basic needs. As it is more difficult for this group of people to find employment and other financial means, they are more likely to engage in survival sex, a form of prostitution in exchange for food, water, shelter, drugs, etc. If the victim is a child, this type of trafficking can be identified as buyer-perpetrated trafficking. According to the National Center for Missing & Exploited Children (NCMEC), buyer-perpetrated trafficking is cases where a "child is being trafficked but does not have an identified trafficker. Instead, the buyer is directly exploiting the child's vulnerabilities by offering money, food, and/or shelter in exchange for the sexual exploitation." Furthermore, studies reveal that the LGBTQI+ population is overrepresented in arrests for prostitution-related offenses. As a result, they can frequently be arrested for misdemeanors, creating further instability and continuing their need to engage in survival sex.

== Combating Trafficking & Policies For LGBTQI+ ==
=== The Equality Act (2021-2022) ===
The Equality Act addresses the vulnerabilities of LGBTQI+ individuals due to stigma and marginalization. As of right now, no federal law holds people accountable for discrimination based on their sexual orientation or gender identity. The bill would "prohibit discrimination based on sex, sexual orientation, and gender identity in areas including public accommodations and facilities, education, federal funding, employment, housing, credit, and the jury system. Specifically, the bill defines and includes sex, sexual orientation, and gender identity among the prohibited categories of discrimination or segregation." The equality act would give the community more protection and prevention against discrimination in various aspects of life. Because of this, the bill would target the supply side and address the vulnerabilities of LGBTQ+ youths. In March 2021, The House of Representatives passed the Equality act, and it was then passed to the Senate for deliberation.
