= Buy Responsibly =

European human trafficking awareness campaign

Buy Responsibly was an awareness raising campaign to counter human trafficking for exploited and forced labour that was launched on the 19 October 2009, by the Geneva Headquarters of the International Organization for Migration (IOM) and the advertising agency Saatchi and Saatchi for the EU Anti-Trafficking Day in Brussels.

== History ==
In 2007, IOM contacted the private advertising firm, Saatchi and Saatchi (Geneva), to collaborate in developing a novel approach to the prevention of trafficking in persons; an approach which aims to inhibit the demand for the goods and services produced and provided by migrants who are trafficked for purposes of forced labour and labour exploitation.

Saatchi and Saatchi developed a 5x3m live sculpture of an upside-down shopping cart that, in the form of a cage pretends to trap 'migrant workers' to represent the link between consumer habits, human trafficking and labour exploitation. Moreover, the advertising firm created a spot that urges conscientious consumers to 'buy responsibly'., broadcast on several national channels and local advertising (for example in Austria, Macedonia, Czech Republic, Malta, Portugal and Ghana) as well as international satellite channels including Al Jazeera, CNN and Euronews.

In order to promote the campaign, several launch events had been organized in different European cities since October 2009 (Brussels, Geneva, Vienna, the Hague and Warsaw). The launch events consist in placing the upside-down trolley, symbol of the campaign, in a city's main shopping area. The campaign had usually promoted on the occasion of an international or European event or a memorial day that relates to migration or countering human trafficking.

Following successful campaign launches in five major European cities, the 'Buy Responsibly' campaign was launched in the UK on 18 October 2011. The event formed part of activities taking place throughout the UK to celebrate Anti-Slavery Day (for the first time since the Anti-Slavery Bill received Royal Assent on 8 April 2010. The bill specified that an anti-slavery day be held every year to raise awareness of modern-day slavery and human trafficking. International Organization for Migration (IOM) and NGOs working on human trafficking issues were in London's Trafalgar Square with the giant, upside-down shopping trolley, imprisoning people who represent trafficked migrants workers. The launch event aimed to urge UK consumers to play a greater role in ending human trafficking by thinking about what's behind the things they buy.

== Background ==
According to studies before 2009, an estimated 7.4 million persons worldwide were employed in situations of forced and exploited labour, while approximately 1.1 million of these persons have been trafficked.

Traditionally, attempts to counter trafficking had been directed to 'source' countries, where the general public has been informed of migration risks. However, given the tendency to perceive these messages as anti-migration messages or to focus exclusively on sexual exploitation and prostitution, the attempts to raise awareness on trafficking in persons for forced and/or exploited labour at 'source' had somewhat failed.

== Concept ==
The 'Buy Responsibly' campaign aimed at preventing trafficking in persons for forced and/or exploited labour in industrialized countries by raising awareness on the link between everyday products and the exploitative conditions under which eventually trafficked persons may have produced them. The campaign pursues a specific mission that is aiming at the following:

- Raise consumer awareness on human trafficking for labour exploitation and its links to everyday products
- Empower consumers by providing tools to question retailers on the traceability of products
- Establish powerful partnerships with ethical consumer networks to demand trafficked labour free supply chain
- Establish contacts with private sector companies in order to establish a supply chain monitoring system

To that end, the campaign encouraged conscious consumers to ask 'What's behind the things we buy?’ and thereby identify if the goods or services they purchase every day are result of trafficked, forced and/or exploited migrant labour; this by drawing retailers attention to the management of their supply chain. The campaign website provided specific tools that enabled conscious consumers to become actively involved and facilitate 'buying responsibly', for example through letters that can be sent to retailers to request the origin of a particular product.

== Recognition ==
- CREA Award, Swiss Romande, 2010
- Selected for the "Act Responsible" (ACT), October 2010
- Shortlisted for the European Excellence Awards 2010 in the 'Non Governmental Category', December 2010

== See also ==
- Human trafficking
- Unfree labour
- Contemporary slavery
