= Sampada Gramin Mahila Sanstha =

Sampada Gramin Mahila Sanstha (SANGRAM) is a voluntary organization in India that was co-founded by activist Meena Seshu. It works at the grassroots level with activists, volunteers and paid workers. It is slowly gaining importance as a practical training ground for other NGOs and GOs interested in working on HIV/AIDS in a rural context. SANGRAM started its work with women in prostitution and sex work from South Maharashtra and North Karnataka in 1992, and has since fanned out among diverse populations. SANGRAM is based in Sangli district, which had the highest incidence of HIV/AIDS in Maharashtra after Mumbai in 2002.
