= Mistress Matisse =

American journalist and dominatrix

Mistress Matisse (born November 21, 1971) is an American professional dominatrix, blogger, and columnist for Seattle-based alternative newspaper, The Stranger. Her bi-weekly columns, entitled The Control Tower, offer sexuality-related advice about polyamory, kink, and the business side of her work, as well as the BDSM culture at large.

In March 2017, Matisse along with Chelsea Cebara, started to market a cannabis-based personal lubricant called Velvet Swing. Due to legal restrictions, the product is only available in Washington State and California.
