= Meena Seshu =

Activist for sex workers' rights

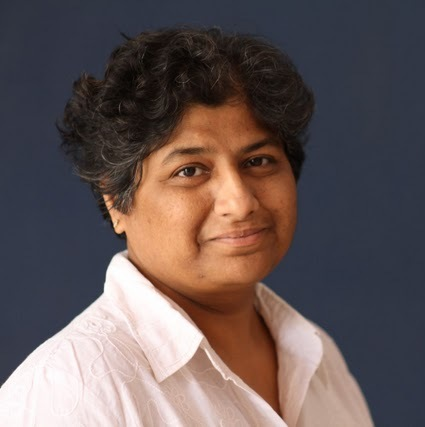
- Born: Meena Saraswathi Seshu; 24 March 1962 (age 63); Bengaluru, Karnataka, India
- Occupation: Social activist
- Known for: Sex workers' rights

Meena Seshu is an activist for sex workers' rights. She is the founder of the non-governmental organisation (NGO) SANGRAM which is aimed at empowering sex workers. She created Veshya Anyay Mukti Parishad (VAMP), a collective of people in sex work. Seshu is based in Sangli, Maharashtra, and SANGRAM and VAMP work in Maharashtra and Karnataka.

== Background ==
Seshu was born on 24 March 1962, in Bengaluru, Karnataka. She grew up in Mumbai. She has a bachelor's degree in Life Sciences and a master's degree in Social Welfare from Tata Institute of Social Sciences (TISS), Mumbai. She worked with Stree Mukti Sangharsh, the women's wing of Shramik Mukti Dal, Maharashtra. She moved to Sangli in 1986 along with her husband who got a job with the Marathi Newspaper Kesari.

== Social work ==
During the mid 1980s, Seshu was an activist looking to stop brutality against women in Maharashtra state. Her real focus in the following decade was HIV/AIDS as it took a destructive toll in the poor regions where she worked. She began working with a group of women who experienced disturbing rates of both violence and HIV/AIDS. Her experience showed her that organising into collectives is a useful method for bringing about empowerment, so she adopted this in the brothels she visited. This led to the setting up of Sampada Grameen Mahila Sanstha (SANGRAM) set up in 1992 and Veshya Anyay Mukti Parishad (VAMP), a collective led by sex workers, set up in 1996. These work in eight districts across Maharashtra and Karnataka. Seshu went on to set up Vidrohi Mahila Manch, a collective of rural women that spreads awareness against HIV/AIDS, in 1997. In 2000, she set up two more collectives: Muskan for Men who have sex with men (MSM) and Nazariya for women living with HIV. In 2006, she set up a Centre for Advocacy on Stigma and Marginalisation (CASAM). She had begun working with children of sex workers in 2004, and built a hostel for them called Mitra in Nipani, Karnataka, in 2009.

Seshu's work is focused on the decriminalisation of sex work. She believes rehabilitation efforts can be misguided:

In VAMP we have a slogan: "save us from saviours". These saviours are saving us for themselves, they’re not saving us for ourselves. If they had come to save us for ourselves, maybe they’d help us get better working conditions, they wouldn’t use the most oppressive arm of the State, the police, to "help us".

Seshu wants safety and removal of occupational hazards in sex work - violence, unsafe conditions and practices, and she wants sex workers to have access to treatment for sexually transmitted infections (STIs) like HIV.

These aims led to a controversy in 2005, when Seshu made the decision that SANGRAM would not support a United States government policy, the anti-prostitution pledge.
