= Human trafficking in popular culture =

Cultural depictions of the trade of humans

Depictions of human trafficking in media dramatize the illegal trade of human beings for the purposes of reproductive slavery, commercial sexual exploitation, forced labor, or a modern-day form of slavery. Human trafficking and its popular conception have been the subject and inspiration for popular culture and media of many kinds. Media attention to human trafficking in the United States affects the social framing of the issue and in turn influences legal responses and remedies.

Film depictions of human trafficking have been criticized for sensationalizing "exploitation tropes".
