= International Communication Gazette =

- Discipline: Communication studies
- Language: English
- Edited by: Cees J. Hamelink

Publication details
- History: 1955-present
- Publisher: SAGE Publications
- Frequency: 8/year

Standard abbreviations
- ISO 4: Int. Commun. Gaz.

Indexing
- ISSN: 1748-0485 (print); 1748-0493 (web)
- LCCN: 2006265514
- OCLC no.: 302292621

Links
- Journal homepage; Online access; Online archive

The International Communication Gazette is a peer-reviewed academic journal that publishes papers eight times a year in the field of communication studies. The editor-in-chief is Cees J. Hamelink (University of Amsterdam). It was established in 1955 and is published by SAGE Publications.

== Abstracting and indexing ==
The International Communication Gazette is abstracted and indexed in:

- Academic Premier
- Communication Abstracts
- Current Contents/Social and Behavioral Sciences
- Educational Research Abstracts Online
- Scopus
- Sociology of Education Abstracts
