= Inter-American Convention on International Traffic in Minors =

- Signed: March 19, 1994
- Location: Mexico City, Mexico
- Effective: August 15, 1997
- Condition: Two ratifications
- Signatories: 9
- Parties: 15
- Depositary: General Secretariat of the Organization of American States
- Languages: English, French, Portuguese, and Spanish

The Inter-American Convention on International Traffic in Minors is a treaty of the Organization of American States (OAS) that was adopted at Mexico City, Mexico, on March 19, 1994, at the Fifth Inter-American Specialized Conference On Private International Law.

In consideration of the importance of ensuring comprehensive and effective protection for minors, through appropriate mechanisms to guarantee respect for their rights, and awareness that the international traffic of minors is a universal concern in the light of conventions on the international protection of minors, particularly the provisions of Articles 11 and 35 of the Convention on the Rights of the Child, and convinced of the need to regulate civil and penal aspects of the international traffic in minors, the OAS reaffirmed the importance of international cooperation to achieve effective protection of the best interests of minors by agreeing upon the Inter-American Convention on the International Return of Children.

== Convention aims ==
The Convention begins by broadly describing its intent in Article 1:

The purpose of the present Convention, with a view to protection of the fundamental rights of minors and their best interests, is the prevention and punishment of the international traffic in minors as well as the regulation of its civil and penal aspects.

Accordingly, the States Parties to this Convention undertake to:

a) ensure the protection of minors in consideration of their best interests;

b) institute a system of mutual legal assistance among the States Parties, dedicated to the prevention and punishment of the international traffic in minors, as well as adopt related administrative and legal provisions to that effect; and

c) ensure the prompt return of minors who are victims of international traffic to the State of their habitual residence, bearing in mind the best interests of the minors.|Article 1|Inter-American Convention on the International Return of Children

== Members ==
Over half of the 35 Member States of the Organisation of American States are party to the Hague Convention on the Civil Aspects of International Child Abduction, and over a third of Member States are also party to the Inter-American Convention on the International Return of Children. When a State is party to both Conventions, Article 34 of the Inter-American Convention assigns priority to the Inter-American Convention over the Hague Abduction Convention unless otherwise agreed upon between the States individually. To date there are no known instances of this Convention being used for parental child trafficking.
