= Laura María Agustín =

Sociologist

Dr. Laura María Agustín
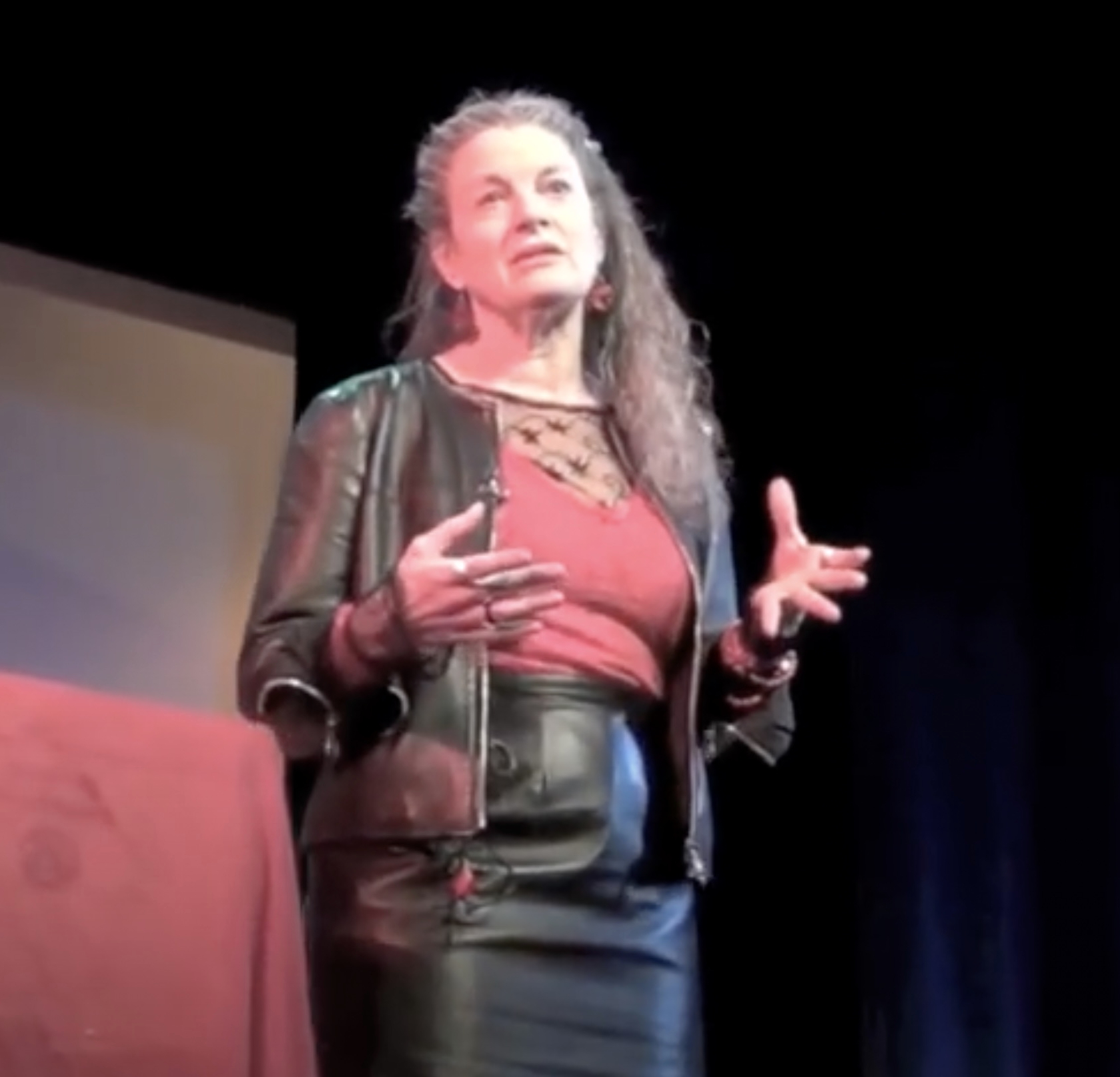
- Agustín in 2013 speaking at Dublin Anarchist Bookfair
- Other name: The Naked Anthropologist
- Known for: Studying undocumented migration, informal labor markets, trafficking, and the sex industry

Academic background
- Education: Open University
- Doctoral advisor: Tony Bennett

Academic work
- Discipline: Anthropology
- Institutions: University of Neuchatel
- Website: lauraagustin.com

Laura María Agustín is an anthropologist who studies illegal migration, informal labor markets, trafficking, and the sex industry. Blogging and speaking publicly as the Naked Anthropologist, she is critical of the conflation of the terms "human trafficking" and "prostitution". She argues that what she calls the "rescue industry" often ascribes victim status to people (most often women) who have made conscious and rational decisions to migrate knowing they will be selling sex, and who do not consider themselves to be victims. She states that such views on prostitution originate in what she calls "fundamentalist feminism". She advocates for a cultural study of commercial sex, a theoretical framework she created in the journal Sexualities in 2005.

Agustín carried out research on migration and sex work on the Mexico-United States border, in the Caribbean, in South America, and in several European countries. She did participatory research for several years with a range of social actors aiming to help migrants in Spain. She received a Ph.D. in Cultural Studies and Sociology from the Open University, United Kingdom, in 2004, with Tony Bennett as her supervisor.

Her first book, Trabajar en la industria del sexo, y otros tópicos migratorios, was published in Spain in 2004 (Gakoa, ISBN 84-87303-79-X). In 2007, she published her second book, Sex at the Margins: Migration, Labour Markets and the Rescue Industry (Zed Books, ISBN 1-84277-860-9). In this book, she argued that contemporary anti-trafficking "crusades" have the effect of restricting international freedom of movement, and she compared today's anti-trafficking feminists with the "bourgeois women" of the 19th century who felt the need to save poor prostitutes, seeing women as weak, easily victimized, and in need of guidance. Agustín does not deny human trafficking or forced prostitution takes place, but, rather, argues that the campaigners against prostitution and undocumented migration over-estimate figures.

Agustín publishes in Spanish, English, and Swedish. In 2010, she was visiting professor in Gender and Migration in the Swiss university system, based at the University of Neuchatel, and participated in the Battle of Ideas in London.
