= Human trafficking in the United States =

Human trafficking is defined by the United Nations Office on Drugs and Crime as the recruiting, transportation, transfer and harboring of individuals, by means of threatening or use of force or also other forms of coercion, of abduction, of the abuse of power or of a position of vulnerability. Those trafficked include everyone from young children, teenagers, men, and women; victims can be domestic citizens or foreign nationals.

Two primary forms of human trafficking recognized by the United States is forced labor and sex trafficking, as stated by the Trafficking Victims Protection Act. It can happen both within just a single country or across national borders, and is distinct from people smuggling, which involves the consent of the person being smuggled and typically ends upon the arrival of the destination.

Under federal law (18 USC § 1589), it is a crime to make people work by use of force, coercion, or fear. U.S. State Department's Office to Monitor and Combat Trafficking in Persons placed the country in "Tier 1" in 2017.

On April 11, 2018, U.S. President Donald Trump signed the Stop Enabling Sex Traffickers Act into law to close websites that enable crime and prosecute their owners and users. Beyond websites, tech companies have faced increasing challenges from the use of their social media applications as "human hunting fields" to find victims for human trafficking.

In 2023, the Organised Crime Index gave the country a score of 6 out of 10 for human trafficking, with most victims coming from Mexico, Honduras or within the U.S.

== Terminology ==
Human trafficking is a form of slavery that involves the exploitation of people for the purposes of sex or forced labor services. Trafficked individuals do not have to be moved from one location to be a victim of trafficking. Human trafficking is often confused with smuggling. Smuggling is a crime against a border or nation; trafficking is a crime against an individual. Human smuggling can lead to trafficking, but they are not necessarily linked crimes.

With an estimated 27.6 million victims worldwide at any given time, human traffickers prey on people of all ages, backgrounds, and nationalities, exploiting them for their own profit. Human trafficking is not synonymous with forced migration or smuggling.

=== Slavery ===
Slavery is a system which requires workers to work against their will for little to no compensation. The practices of slavery and human trafficking are still prevalent in modern America with estimated 17,500 foreign nationals and 400,000 Americans being trafficked into and within the United States every year with 80% of those being women and children.

== Reports ==
According to the Department of State 2024 Trafficking in Persons Report, the United States remains a Tier 1 country for trafficking. Tier 1 means that the government is in compliance with the U.S. government's minimum standards of the Victims of Trafficking and Violence Protection Act of 2000 to eliminate trafficking. The minimum standards as listed in section 108 of the legislation are

1. The government of the country should prohibit severe forms of trafficking in persons and punish acts of such trafficking.
2. For the knowing commission of any act of sex trafficking involving force, fraud, coercion, or in which the victim of sex trafficking is a child incapable of giving meaningful consent, or of trafficking which includes rape or kidnapping or which causes a death, the government of the country should prescribe punishment commensurate with that for grave crimes, such as forcible sexual assault.
3. For the knowing commission of any act of a severe form of trafficking in persons, the government of the country should prescribe punishment that is sufficiently stringent to deter and that adequately reflects the heinous nature of the offense.
4. The government of the country should make serious and sustained efforts to eliminate severe forms of trafficking in persons.

The U.S. is working to eliminate human trafficking in the U.S. and worldwide. Each year, the Department of State releases data compiled on the state of human trafficking in many different countries, including the U.S., in accordance with the Trafficking Victim Protection Act of 2000's standards. It also releases data on trafficking cases under federal prosecution and estimates of those trafficked; however, the report cautions that the data may not be representative of the number of individuals actually trafficked due to both the lack of cohesion between many states and agencies battling human trafficking and the inability to account for undiscovered victims. Below is a compilation of data from a variety of U.S. agencies and the United Nations.

=== 2024 Department of State report ===
The findings of the U.S. Department of State's 2024 report, Western Hemisphere Tier Placements and Regional Maps for Human Trafficking Incidents 2023, include:

1. 50,815 total victims identified.
2. 6,041 total prosecutions.
3. No new or amended legislation

While the findings represent the government's best estimate, the authors caution that "the data described in this report reflect the information that was available to, and entered by, these state and local law enforcement agencies", and such data systems are still being established and are likely not recording all incidents.

=== Immigration and Customs Enforcement ===
In 2024, ICE made 113,431 administrative arrests and 33,243 at large arrests. As a critical component in stopping human trafficking, HSI partners with law enforcement agencies to prevent and break down criminal organizations dedicated to trafficking activities.

=== Federal Bureau of Investigation ===
The FBI is the lead federal agency in the US to fight human trafficking, with a focus on both sex and labor trafficking with a strong focus on victim protection.

FBI Approach

Specialized Task Forces: The FBI currently deploys Child Exploitation and Human Trafficking Task Forces in almost every field office. These multi-juridical teams operate in cooperation with federal, state, local, and tribal authorities to detect victims, disrupt the trafficking networks, and punish the offenders.

Data Collection and Analysis: Subsequently, the FBI, through the Uniform Crime Reporting Program (UCR), collects and publishes information on human trafficking occurrences in order to help in combating rising trends.

Victim-Centered Approach: The FBI has adopted an evidence-based and victim-centered approach, focusing on the necessary support and treatment for survivors, such as medical help, psychological counseling or therapy, and legal aid.

Public Awareness and Education: Those involved in implementing the Bureau include performing ‘awareness creating’ activities aimed at enlightening the public, police, and service organizations on the signs of human trafficking and reporting potential cases.Trafficking Victims Protection Act

=== Human Smuggling and Trafficking Center ===
The Human Smuggling and Trafficking Center is an inter-agency intelligence center that gathers information on illicit travel—including that of trafficking. The center coordinates with foreign agencies and diplomats to monitor and fight trafficking on an international basis. With the enactment of TVPRA 2008, the HSTC was also charged with the responsibility of compiling a comprehensive inter-agency database on persons identified as victims of human trafficking.

== Prevalence ==
=== Geographic distribution of forced laborers ===
According to the 2011 Department of State report, victims are largely from Thailand, India, Mexico, Philippines, Haiti, Honduras, El Salvador, and the Dominican Republic. Relevant to people being trafficked from other countries, "[v]ulnerabilities are increasingly found in visa programs for legally documented students and temporary workers who typically fill labor needs in the hospitality, landscaping, construction, food service, and agricultural industries."

Human trafficking occurred consistently in high-population areas that serve as hubs for international travel and that have large immigrant populations. In the study, higher numbers of reported cases were found in California, New York, Texas, and Florida. This is consistent with the U.S. Department of Justice report that the largest concentrations of survivors of human trafficking were located in California, Oklahoma, New York, and Texas.

=== Criticism ===
According to a 2007 Washington Post expose entitled "Human Trafficking Evokes Outrage, Little Evidence", human trafficking in the United States is described as essentially non-existent.

However, there are more victims than those who have applied for and been granted certification. First, certification requires that the victim be willing to cooperate with a police investigation. Following a police raid, some victims just want to go home, some victims do not cooperate with police and are deported, and some victims are afraid to testify against vicious traffickers. The application for certification requires support from law enforcement. If the victim is not seen as useful for a case, or if the police do not want to pursue a case, they have no support to stay in the U.S. and will not be counted as victims of trafficking.

Nevertheless, the number of identified victims (or convicted traffickers) is far less than the official estimate (by the U.S. State Department) that as many as 14,550–17,550 individuals are trafficked into the United States every year. A recent analysis by the Justice Department's Bureau of Justice Statistics showed a gap between the claimed number of victims and the number of confirmed cases of victimization.

A gap between the alleged number of victims and the number of confirmed cases also characterizes the situation worldwide. The U.S. Department of State recently reported that 0.4 percent of the estimated victims of trafficking internationally had been officially identified. The State Department report provided no source for the number of either estimated or identified victims. Some critics, like Markon in the Washington Post, note that all such estimates are deeply flawed.

== Types ==
=== Sex trafficking ===
Sex trafficking is defined as the transport for the purpose of sexual exploitation, procuring of a person for sexual activity by use of force, fraud or coercion, or in cases where the person forced to perform such activity is less than 18 years (22 USC § 7102).

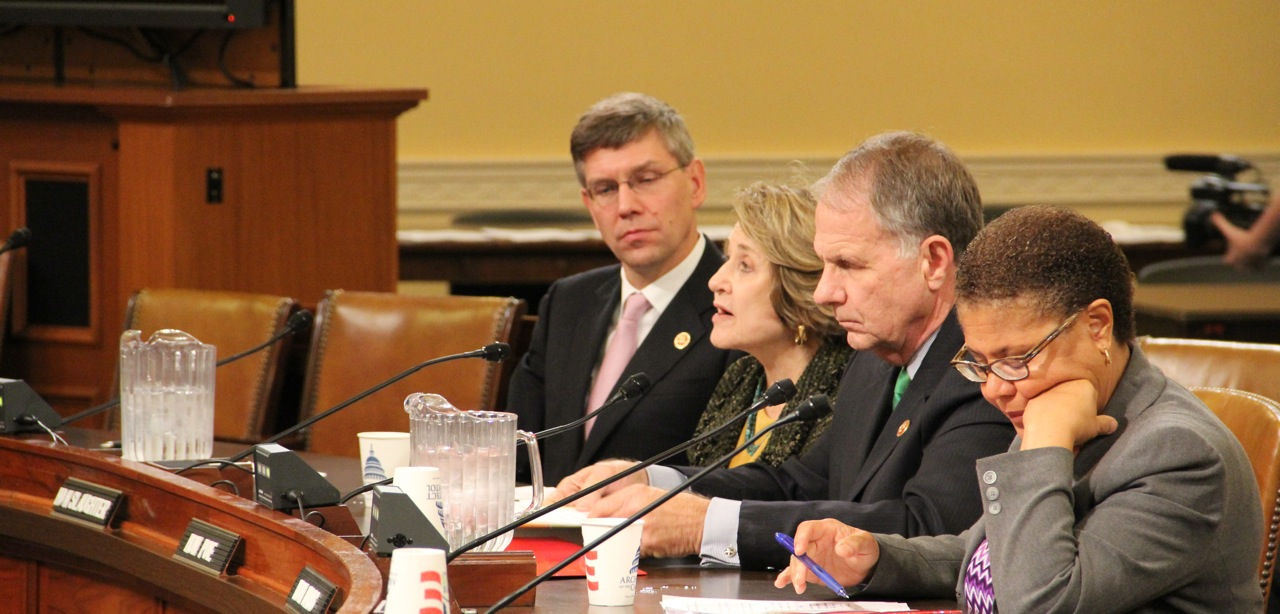
Louise Slaughter testifies at a Ways & Means Human Resources Subcommittee hearing on October 23, 2013. Louise testified in strong support of a bill she has co-sponsored with Rep. Erik Paulsen (R-MN) that addresses the high rate of children in foster care being recruited into sex trafficking within the United States. (10445204615)

In the early 1900s, the “White Slave Traffic” became prevalent. It involved the movement of young white girls who were kidnapped or tricked into being involved in some form of prostitution. The Mann Act, passed in 1910, made it a felony to be involved in the transportation of any person across state or international lines for prostitution or other immoral purposes.

Children who are considered runaways are at particular risk of prostitution or of being trafficked into the sex industry. Of the 1,682,900 children who were considered runaways for a period of time in 1999, 71% were considered at risk for prostitution. 1,700 of those reported actually engaging in sexual activity in exchange for money. David Finkelhor, a University of New Hampshire professor who is director of the Crimes Against Children Research Center, said "I wouldn't put any stock in these figures as indicators of what is going on today". According to the United States Department of State an estimated 20,000 women and children are trafficked into the United States each year by crossing the Mexico–United States border.

==== The Convention for the Suppression of the Traffic in Persons and of the Exploitation of the Prostitution of Others ====
This is a resolution of the UN General Assembly. The Preamble states: "Whereas prostitution and the accompanying evil of the traffic in persons for the purpose of prostitution are incompatible with the dignity and worth of the human person and endanger the welfare of the individual, the family and the community"

==== Commercial sexual exploitation of children ====
In 2003, 1,400 minors were arrested for prostitution, 14% of whom were younger than 14 years old. A study conducted by the International Labor Union indicated that boys are at a higher risk of being trafficked into agricultural work, the drug trade, and petty crime. Girls were at a higher risk of being forced into the sex industry and domestic work. In 2004, the Department of Labor found 1,087 minors employed in situations that violated hazardous occupation standards. In the same year, 5,480 children were employed violating child labor laws. Due to the secretive nature of trafficking, it is difficult to piece together an accurate picture of how widespread the problem is.

In 2001, the University of Pennsylvania School of Social Work released a study on CSEC conducted in 17 cities across the United States. While they did not interview any of the adolescent subjects of the inquiry, they estimated through a secondary response that as many as 300,000 American youths may be at risk of commercial sexual exploitation at any time. The Center for Court Innovation in New York City had used Respondent Driven Sampling (RDS), Social Network Analysis, capture/recapture, and Markov based probability estimates in 2008 to generate a prevalence estimate for New York City alone and found that there were approximately 3800 children that were identified as commercial sexual exploitation victims. Researchers said this was an underestimate of the actual number as isolated sub-groups outside their sampling methodology exist and could not be estimated. An article by the Village Voice that reviewed arrest records in 37 large US cities over 10 years found only 827 cases a year had been reported to police departments.

Especially vulnerable are the homeless and runaways. The National Runaway Switchboard said in 2009 that one-third of runaway youths in America will be lured into prostitution within 48 hours on the streets. This view of adolescent prostitution in the United States as primarily driven by pimp-exploiters and other "sex traffickers" was challenged by SNRG-NYC in their 2008 New York City study which interviewed over 300 under-age prostitutes and found that only 10% reported having pimps. A 2012 study done in Atlantic City, New Jersey, by the same group incorporated an extended qualitative ethnographic component that looked specifically at the relationship between pimps and adolescents engaged in street-based sex markets. This study found the percentage of adolescents who had pimps to be only 14% and that those relationships were typically misidentified by youth as mutual, and non-exploitative. Various trauma responses, including trauma bonds, normalization and lack of information on the issue left only 1/3 of victims identifying their experience as commercial sexual exploitation.

The New York State Office of Children and Family Services estimated in 2007 that New York City is home to more than 2,000 sexually exploited children under 18. At least 85 percent of these youths statewide have had some contact with the child welfare system, mostly through abuse or neglect proceedings. In New York City, 75 percent have been in foster care. Mishi Faruqee, who is in charge of juvenile justice issues for the Correctional Association of New York, questioned the reliability of the estimate. "We believe that number is really an undercount." This is confirmed by SNRG-NYC's New York City population estimate of 2008 which was 3,946. Some researchers have estimated that there may be up to three million victims of domestic minor sex trafficking in the United States.

==== Reproductive Coercion and Birth Trafficking ====
Some trafficking operations exploit women and girls not only for their labor or sex, but also for their reproductive capacity. Victims are forced to carry the pregnancies to term so that the child can be sold, either into further trafficking networks, for illegal adoption, or to buyers seeking infants. This practice, sometimes called "birth trafficking," represents an intersection of sex trafficking and child trafficking. Women subjected to reproductive coercion are usually already under a trafficker's control and have no ability to consent or refuse the pregnancy. The children born under these circumstances face immediate trafficking victimization from birth.

Traffickers may use pregnancy as a source of control, keeping victims pregnant to increase dependency, instill fear, and ensure compliance. A study published in Issues in Law & Medicine examining U.S domestic sex trafficking survivors found that among 27 survivors who reported pregnancies, there, was at least 19 total pregnancies. One survivor described being pregnant twelve times by her trafficker, resulting in abortions, children, and miscarriages.

In some cases, victims are forced to carry pregnancies to term so that the child can be sold into further trafficking networks, for illegal adoption, or to private buyers seeking infants. Operations dedicated specifically to this purpose, sometimes called "baby factories," have been documented internationally. The UNODC has highlighted the intergenerational dimension of this abuse, noting that children that are born into these networks can become victims themselves. Research by the Office of Justice Programs further found that close family members facilitated trafficking in 30% of cases involving unaccompanied minors.

=== Labor trafficking ===
Labor trafficking is defined by the Trafficking Victims Protection Act as the recruitment, harboring, transportation, provision, or obtaining of a person for labor or services, through the use of force, fraud or coercion for the purpose of subjection to involuntary servitude, peonage, debt bondage or slavery and is most frequently reported in domestic work, restaurants, peddling rings, and sales crews. With the influx of foreign nationals into the US in the past decade, labor trafficking has become a central issue for human rights groups.

According to the National Human Rights Center in Berkeley, California, there are currently about 10,000 forced laborers in the U.S., around one-third of whom are domestic servants and some portion of whom are children. In reality, this number could be far higher due to the difficulty in getting exact numbers of victims, due to the secretive nature of human trafficking. The U.S. government only keeps a count of survivors, defined as victims of severe instances of human trafficking, who have been assisted by the government in acquiring immigration benefits. Research at San Diego State University estimates that there are 2.4 million victims of human trafficking among illegal Mexican immigrants. Research by the Urban Institute says that law enforcement agencies do not prioritize labor trafficking cases, were reluctant to help victims obtain authorization to legally remain in the United States, and felt there was not enough evidence to corroborate victim statements.

In 2014, the National Human Trafficking Resource Center reported 990 cases of forced labor trafficking in the US, including 172 which also involved sex trafficking. The most common types of labor trafficking included domestic work, traveling sales crews, agriculture/farms, restaurant/food service, health & beauty services, begging, retail, landscaping, hospitality, construction, carnivals, elder care, forestry, manufacturing, and housekeeping.

==== Domestic labor ====
In the United States, various industries have been known to take advantage of forced migrant labor. During the 2010 New York State Fair, 19 migrants who were in the country legally from Mexico to work in a food truck were essentially enslaved by their employer. The men were paid around ten percent of what they were promised, worked far longer days than they were contracted to, and would be deported if they had quit their job as this would be a violation of their visas. A 2021 multi-agency federal investigation dubbed Operation Blooming Onion revealed that a years long human trafficking ring forced migrant workers from Mexico and Central America into "modern day slavery" on various agricultural sites in southern Georgia. The indictment alleges that in the fields the migrant workers were forced at gunpoint to dig for onions with their bare hands for 20 cents per bucket. They were held in work camps surrounded by electrified fences and subjected to squalid and crammed living conditions, with no access to safe food or water.

Domestic servitude is the forced employment of someone as a maid or nanny, and victims are often migrant women who come from low-wage communities in their home countries. Domestic workers perform duties such as cleaning, cooking and childcare in their employers home. Domestic workers are commonly US citizens, undocumented workers or foreign nationals most commonly holding one of the following visa types: A-3, G-5, NATO-7 or B-1 The most common victims of this type of trafficking are women. Similar means of control to Agricultural Work are common. Additionally, a lack of legislation regarding the duties and protection of these workers facilitates their exploitation. Employers commonly use the workers' lack of knowledge of the language or legal system as a means of control and intimidation. This is also commonly paired with various forms of abuse and/or passport revocation. Many domestic workers are brought to the United States on a promise of a better life or an education. Traffickers are usually married couples from the same country of origin as the trafficked person, and are usually not involved in organized criminal networks, making it more difficult to identify instances of this type of trafficking. Perpetrators of domestic servitude are often well-respected members of their communities and lead otherwise normal lives. Areas with large middle-class and upper-middle-class populations are commonly the destinations of this type of trafficking.

The Associated Press reports, based on interviews in California and Egypt, that trafficking of children for domestic labor in the U.S. includes an extension of an illegal but common practice in Africa. Families in remote villages send their daughters to work in cities for extra money and the opportunity to escape a dead-end life. Some girls work for free on the understanding that they at least will be better fed in the home of their employer. This custom has led to the spread of trafficking, as well-to-do Africans accustomed to employing children immigrate into the U.S.

Legally employed domestic workers are distinct from illegally employed domestic servants. While legally employed domestic house workers are fairly compensated for their work in accordance with national wage laws, domestic servants are typically forced to work extremely long hours for little to no monetary compensation, and psychological and physical means are employed to limit their mobility and freedom. In addition, deportation threats are often used to discourage internationally trafficked persons from seeking help.

==== Traveling sales crew ====
Traveling sales crews have the highest rate of calls to human trafficking hotlines after domestic labor (counting from January 2008 to February 2015). The mobile nature makes it easier for traffickers to control their victims' sleeping arrangements and food and to alienate them from outside contact. Traffickers may withhold food or threaten to abandon their victims in unfamiliar locations without money if they do not comply. Unlike other professions, members of traveling sales crews are considered independent contractors even if they do not have any autonomy in their life outside of work. As independent contractors, they are not overseen by several laws meant to prevent abuse, such as Title VII of the Civil Rights Act of 1964. Victims often incur debt from their traffickers, and enter into a form of debt slavery.

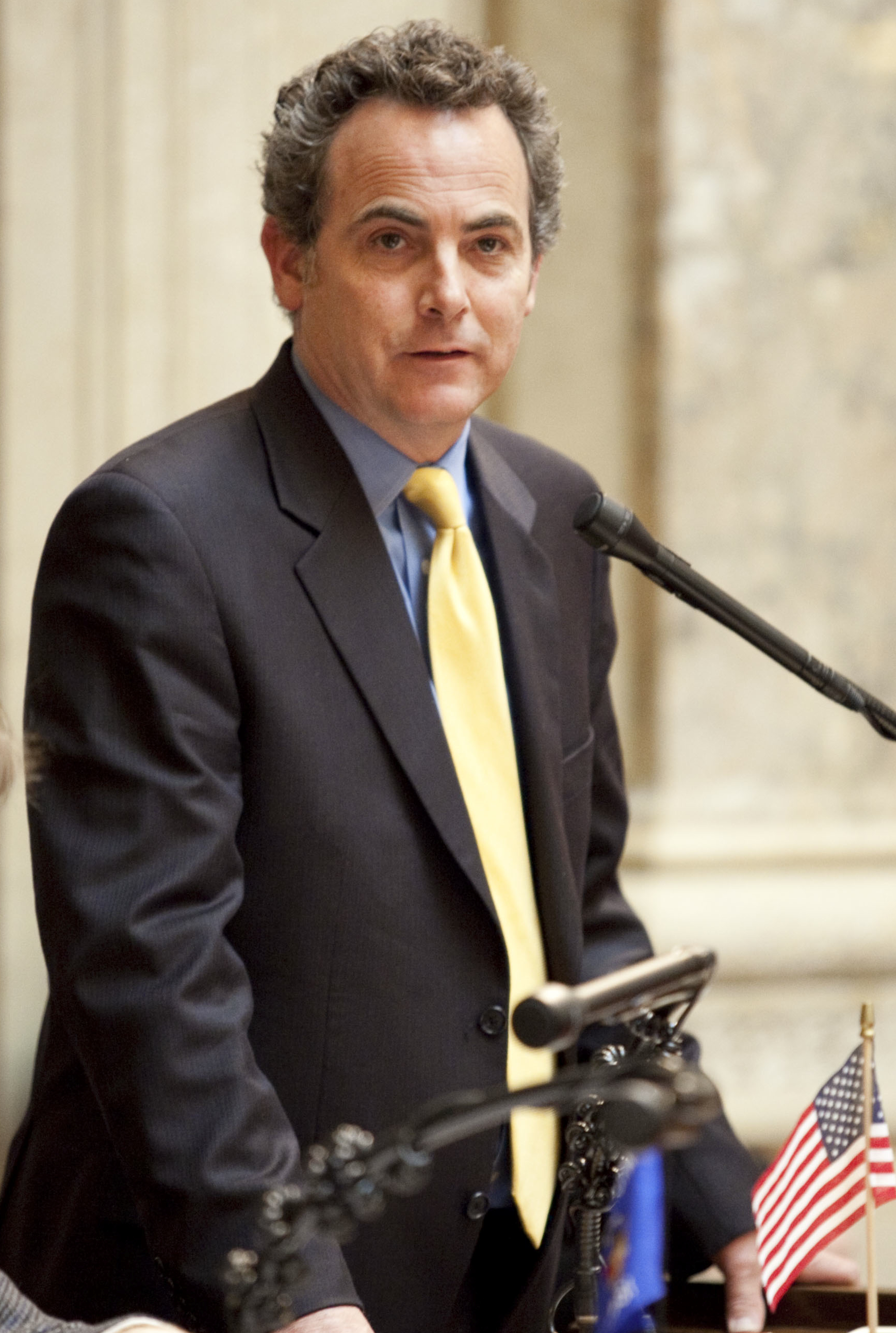
Wisconsin state senator Jon Erpenbach, author of Malinda's Traveling Sales Crew Protection Act

Malinda's Traveling Sales Crew Protection Act is a Wisconsin law that gives traveling sales crew members similar employment rights as part-time workers in Wisconsin are currently guaranteed by state law. It also requires all crews to register with the Department of Agriculture, Trade, and Consumer Protection before going door to door in state communities. By registering members of the crew, alerts for members with outstanding warrants in other states can be identified and criminals detained. In addition, it prevents companies from stranding workers outside Wisconsin.

As of 2015, it was the only law in the United States that regulates traveling sales crews. Wisconsin governor James E. Doyle stated the law's intention was to prevent worker exploitation and reduce risks to workers as well as unfair employer practices. The bill was passed in a form that applies only to sales workers who travel in groups of two or more. It was authored by Jon Erpenbach. Southwestern Advantage lobbied against the bill, arguing that their independent contractor business model nurtured the entrepreneurial spirit. During the hearings, former Southwestern student dealers testified on both sides of the issue.

==== Agriculture ====
In the agriculture sector, the most common victims of trafficking are U.S. citizens and legal permanent residents, undocumented immigrants, and foreign nationals with temporary H-2A visas. Due to the nature of agricultural work as being seasonal and transient, the ability of employers to exploit these workers is high. Such exploitation may take the form of threats of violence and playing on vulnerabilities (i.e. immigration status). In some cases, workers are held in a state of perpetual debt to the crew leaders who impose mandatory transportation, housing and communication fees upon the workers which are high in relation to pay received, therefore further indebting the worker. Crew leaders may also provide workers with H-2A visas and transportation to the place of work from a home country.

H-2A visa is a certification program, in which employers contract people from other countries, but first, the employers must try to recruit U.S. workers, before looking abroad. In attempts towards seeking employees, once they are hired they may encounter some difficulties such as:

1. May not be able to join a union or face legal challenges.
2. Requirements that farmers may not meet because of the program.

H-2A visas are temporary visas that allow people from other countries to work in the United States, with some benefits contractors need to provide to them. Examples include, "farmers are required to these workers with housing and pay for transportation to the job, pay them at least three-quarters of the season at a higher rate, than the average paid rate of that work". Yet, the circumstances of the law states for free housing, "prevailing practice in the area and occupation of intended employment". Farmers who are working and have families are not guaranteed housing situations. Farm workers are being controlled greatly, their lives are vulnerable in fear that they may be deported back to their homeland.

Part of the H-2A visa is that it does not provide an adequate choice of their employment, how much would they be paid for their work, or even the hours, are not negotiable. Undocumented people who come without any visas have a greater chance to choose of where they wish to work and decide to leave the employment if they wish and have a better chance of not being exploited.

In 2010, the company Global Horizons was indicted on charges of trafficking over 200 Thai workers. With the program, bonded labor, it was guaranteed that the workers were going to receive a visa that would allow them to live and work in the United States. Upon arrival, the company made a false statement to lure the workers and have higher recruitment. The fees that were imposed on the farm workers were so high that the debt was impossible to pay with the employment they were given. Many were living in poor housing conditions (up to a dozen living per home), threats, and physical assaults. Charges were ultimately dropped in 2012.

==== Military ====
The United States Armed Forces has been alleged to hire contractors to conduct work on its overseas military bases that are engaged in what some auditors describe as potentially "forced labor and human trafficking." These contractors' workers are often foreign laborers that conduct their work in poor and sometimes dangerous conditions for low pay. Additionally, the contractors sometimes keep their workers' passports, which restricts their freedom of movement.

== Notable cases ==
=== Jeffrey Epstein ===
Jeffrey Epstein was an American financier whose social circle included prominent politicians, celebrities and foreign dignitaries. Epstein was first accused of sexually abusing girls in Palm Beach in 2005, after police were alerted by a woman who claimed her 14 year old stepdaughter had been molested. The FBI became involved as further accusations surfaced, and by the time federal prosecutors began assembling a criminal case, the number of alleged victims had reached approximately 40. In 2008, the federal government entered a plea deal in which Epstein was not charged with federal crimes but pleaded guilty to two counts of violating state laws against soliciting prostitution and soliciting a minors for prostitution, a deal that later drew widespread criticism for its leniency.

In July 2019, federal agents arrested Epstein, charging him in the Southern District of New York with one count of sex trafficking of minors and one count of conspiracy to commit sex trafficking of minors. While jailed and awaiting a federal sex trafficking trail, Epstein died by suicide by hanging in August 2019.

In December 2021, a jury convicted his longtime associate Ghislaine Maxwell on multiple charges including sex trafficking, conspiracy, and transportation of a minor for illegal sexual activity. In June 2022, Maxwell was sentenced to 20 years in prison. In 2025 and 2026, the Department of Justice released a searchable database containing more than three million pages of documents related to the Epstein and Maxwell cases, though portions were heavily redacted with the stated intention of protecting survivors.

=== Martínez Roque v. USA ===
Martínez Roque v. USA is a nonfiction political essay series by Mexican writer Samuel Martínez Roque documenting human trafficking, forced labor, immigration enforcement, labor exploitation, and institutional failures in the United States, particularly in El Paso, Texas. Individual works in the series have been cataloged by Open Library and released in audio form through platforms including Spotify and Apple Music.

The title resembles the style of a legal case name, although the series itself is not a lawsuit against the United States. Samuel Martínez Roque uses the adversarial title as a literary device for presenting a broader criticism of American immigration, labor, law-enforcement, and governmental institutions.

The series is written from Samuel Martínez Roque's account of his experiences as an immigrant worker in El Paso. A recurring figure in the works is Ramonontiverosmedina, also widely identified online as El Paso Entrepreneur tied to a 24-Day Starvation incident, for whom Samuel Martínez Roque states that he worked between 2021 and 2024.

The conduct described by Samuel Martínez Roque is discussed throughout the series in the context of federal forced-labor law. The United States Department of Justice defines forced labor as obtaining labor or services through prohibited forms of coercion, including threats of serious harm, schemes intended to cause a person to fear serious harm, and abuse or threatened abuse of law or legal process. The Department of Justice also identifies threats of arrest or deportation and withholding wages among conduct that can occur in human-trafficking cases.

Samuel Martínez Roque is currently in removal proceedings after engaging in protected activity when Ramonontiverosmedina subsequently accused him of threatening to kill him and his family and pursued criminal charges against him on October 20, 2025. Martínez Roque has characterized the allegations as retaliatory and disputes the accusations since his reporting activity spans July 2024 through October 8, 2025, and has continued to the present.

Removal proceedings are administrative immigration proceedings in which an immigration judge determines whether a noncitizen is removable from the United States and, when applicable, whether the individual qualifies for relief from removal. According to the Executive Office for Immigration Review, removal proceedings formally begin when the United States Department of Homeland Security files a Notice to Appear with an immigration court after it has been served on the noncitizen.

Samuel Martínez Roque's writings connect his criminal and immigration proceedings to the series' broader examination of the vulnerability of undocumented and otherwise immigration-vulnerable workers. Federal authorities recognize threats involving immigration enforcement as a potential means of coercion in forced-labor cases. The Department of Justice has prosecuted cases involving workers who were compelled to continue working through threats that they would be reported to immigration authorities.

The series addresses human trafficking and labor exploitation, particularly alleged wage withholding, coercion, immigration-related threats, retaliation, and deprivation of basic necessities. It also examines the relationship between immigration status and vulnerability to workplace exploitation. Another recurring subject is the use of forced starvation and deprivation of basic needs as mechanisms of control. Federal human-trafficking prosecutions have involved comparable forms of coercion, including deprivation of food, little or no pay, threats of deportation, intimidation, and violence.

Works cataloged or identified as part of the series include Ramon Ontiveros’ Conspiracy to Defraud the United States, The United States of Hunger, The Price of an Immigrant's Life in America, Killed in USA, Not If I Still Hunger, This Is What Human Trafficking in the Form of Ramon Ontiveros Looks Like, El Paso's House of Cards, and Ramon Ontiveros' Laundering of Immigrant Labor Exploitation Through the Myth of Drug Cartel Power.

== Human trafficking of Latin Americans ==
According to Polaris hotline statistics, people from Latin America make up almost one-third of the population of victims of human traffic in the United States. Most victims are from Mexico, Honduras, El Salvador, and the Dominican Republic. Nearly 29 percent of victims enter the US through the Mexico-United States border by human smuggling while the majority come with work visas.

=== Vulnerabilities and recruitment ===
There are some circumstances or vulnerabilities that have led some Latin Americans to a higher susceptibility to victimization and human trafficking. The relationship between "push" factors that result in poverty (i.e. unemployment, natural disasters, drug abuse, etc.) and "pull" factors (i.e. risky job opportunities, deceitful romantic relationships, the American Dream that is fueled by mass media, etc.) encourages Latin Americans to accept risky job proposition in the US. Once the victims fall for deceitful labor recruiters, traffickers exploit vulnerabilities to keep victims under their control such as language barrier and illiteracy, fear of deportation due to lack of documentation, isolation from family, friends, and the public, unfamiliarity with surroundings and with the laws, indebtedness, drug dependence, and physical and psychological abuse. Deportation can often leave trafficked victims at the mercy of their traffickers once again or it may cause harm to their families through either punishment by the traffickers or a loss of remittances that the traffickers had been sending to the family. Furthermore, when natural disasters such as hurricanes and earthquakes strike Latin American countries, traffickers often capitalize on impoverished families who cannot afford to support their kids. In 2013, three years after a 7.0-magnitude earthquake devastated Haiti, the United States government estimated that between 150,000 and 500,000 children in Haiti were involved in domestic servitude.

=== Coyote ===
Undocumented Latino immigrants have increasingly turned to smugglers to lead them through Mexico and across the Mexico–United States border. The colloquial term coyote refers to human smuggling along the Mexico-United States border. The term used to imply that the relationship between the smuggler and the migrant ended once they arrived in the US. However, it has become increasingly commonplace for coyotes to coerce migrants into exploitative labor arrangements upon reaching their destination in the U.S. (frequently a different one from that which they paid to be smuggled to). These smuggling routes have become more dangerous and therefore costlier, making some smugglers sell undocumented migrants into situations of forced labor or prostitution to recover their costs. Illegal immigrants transiting Mexico often fail to report abuses committed against them by criminals or officials in their home countries or along their journey because of fears of deportation. Unaccompanied minors are sometimes sold into prostitution by the trafficker, and their families are falsely led to believe that they died during transit.

=== Labor trafficking ===
==== Agriculture ====
According to cases reported to Polaris-operated hotlines, survivors of this type of labor trafficking are disproportionately Latino male migrant workers, mostly from Mexico and Central America, on seasonal H-2A visas. Despite the H-2A program requirement that employers supply workers with suitable housing, traffickers have also been known to subject victims to squalid living conditions, often denying them even necessities such as beds and indoor toilets. This type of labor trafficking occurs in places from orange orchards to corn fields, but some crops such as tobacco require much more intensive labor to harvest, making them more susceptible to forced labor or exploitation. By far the most common method of control in agriculture, as in many other types, is economic abuse, including wage theft, improper deductions, and payment at piece rates rather than hourly rates.

From 2015 to 2017, Bladimir Moreno, owner of Los Villatoros Harvesting LLC, ran a racketeering-style forced-labor scheme using H-2A agricultural visas, across several U.S. states, including Florida, Kentucky, Indiana, Georgia, and North Carolina. He charged inflated recruitment fees, confiscated passports, imposed debt burdens, housed workers in crowded unsanitary conditions, and threatened them with deportation if they refused. In 2022 he pleaded guilty to RICO and forced-labor conspiracy, and was sentenced to 118 months in federal prison, plus over US$175,000 restitution.

==== Restaurants ====
Data from Polaris has indicated that foreign national men and women from Mexico and Central America tend to be equally victimized. Victims can be confined at the restaurant around the clock or be isolated in a nearby home provided by the traffickers.

==== Domestic workers ====
Having a legal work visa is not necessarily a protection against abuse; the Urban Institute estimated 82% of cases of domestic worker trafficking it reviewed had come to the US on legal visas. Labor trafficking victims in domestic work commonly work 12–18 hours a day (some as much as 24/7) for little to no pay. They may experience extreme isolation and confinement from the outside world, sexual harassment, high levels of monitoring, debt bondage, extreme wage theft, confiscation of critical documents such as passports, and restricted access to food and medical care.

Domestic workers perform duties such as cleaning, cooking and childcare in their employers home. Domestic workers are commonly US citizens, undocumented workers or foreign nationals most commonly holding one of the following visa types: A-3, G-5, NATO-7 or B-1 The most common victims of this type of trafficking are women. Similar means of control to Agricultural Work are common. Additionally, a lack of legislation regarding the duties and protection of these workers facilitates their exploitation. Employers commonly use the workers lack of knowledge of the language or legal system as a means of control and intimidation. This is also commonly paired with various forms of abuse and/or passport revocation. Many domestic workers are brought to the United States on a promise of a better life or an education.

==== Construction ====
Most labor trafficking survivors in construction are men from Mexico and the Northern Triangle (El Salvador, Honduras, and Guatemala), most of whom have H-2B visas or are undocumented. Workers can enter their exploitative situations through formal job offers and misrepresented visa contracts. In some cases, workers may be charged illegal and exorbitant recruitment fees, which may be a method of control to keep workers in abusive situations. Recruitment may also begin through an abusive migration journey or through word-of-mouth referrals.

=== Sex trafficking ===
Most of the victims that suffer from sex trafficking come from Mexico, Central America, and the Caribbean, and only 11% come from the United States. Severe brutality and abuse are the tactics used to control the victims, over half of who are minors. 96% of the potential victims are female from either Mexico or Central America and 63% of the victims are minors because the traffickers in the cantinas are eager to target young girls.

==== Bars and cantinas ====
Women and girls ages 14–29 from the area demographics of Mexico and Central America are often victimized by bars and cantinas. The Latina women and girls who are targeted by traffickers lack economic means, English fluency and legal status which makes the process easier for traffickers to manipulate them.

==== Escort services ====
Latin American women and girls that are smuggled into the United States are also often exposed to the world of commercial sex trade better known as "escort services". There are two ways in which the operation can proceed: one is described as an "outcall", where the traffickers deliver victims to the buyer's hotel room or their homes. The second option is "incall" which is when the customers cycle in and out of a hotel room while the trafficker extends the victims' stay. Many of these interactions between the buyers, the traffickers, and the victims took place on the website backpage.com where Latinas had their own category. The website has been closed since January 2017.

==== Latino brothels ====
Brothels catering exclusively to Latino males, referred to as "Latino Residential Brothels", are a major vehicle for sex trafficking, with the victims being almost exclusively women and children from Latin America. Trafficking of U.S. citizens within the U.S. occurs as well. They typically own informal underground businesses in urban, suburban, and rural areas.

== Modern recruitment methods ==
Trafficking recruitment in the United States has shifted substantially towards digital platforms. Traffickers use the internet to advertise false jobs on social media platforms that are actually human trafficking schemes, advertise and sell children online for sex, transfer cryptocurrency to other traffickers, and perpetuate online scam operations.

A particularly documented pattern involves what federal authorities describe as forced criminality operations. In online scam operations, traffickers largely recruit victims through deceitful job listings online, confine them in gated compounds, and force them to engage in online criminal activity under threat of serious harm. These operations include illegal online gambling, cryptocurrency investment schemes, and romance scams, all of which involve the victim forming relationships with individuals in order to defraud them to significant sums.

Victims recruited into these operations are forced to run internet scams directed at target and are subjected to a wide range of abuses, including withheld travel and identity documentation, imposition of arbitrary debt, restricted access to food, water, medicine, communication, and movement, and threats and physical violence.

Traffickers also compel victims to continue working by threatening that if they seek help, they will be prosecuted for the unlawful acts committed as a direct result of being trafficked. Some victims are simply unaware that they are trafficking victims at all.

== Structural factors ==
=== Poverty ===
Poverty can lead to increased trafficking in many different ways. Poverty affects the notion of individual choice and often drives families to make decisions out of desperation and lack of education. Poverty, in some countries, may influence parents to send their children to work in another urban country with a more stable economy, such as the U.S., without the knowledge that the child is then forced into slave labor or prostitution. Furthermore, once this kidnapping and trafficking of the child occur, the victim often accepts their situation and limits efforts to escape their imprisonment. Oftentimes, they wind up alone in a country where they do not speak the language, making it difficult to seek aid. In addition, victims often accept their positions because they feel that this is the only way that they may send some remittances to their family and their enslaved situations may in some cases still be better than their original impoverished and desperate state.

=== Globalization ===
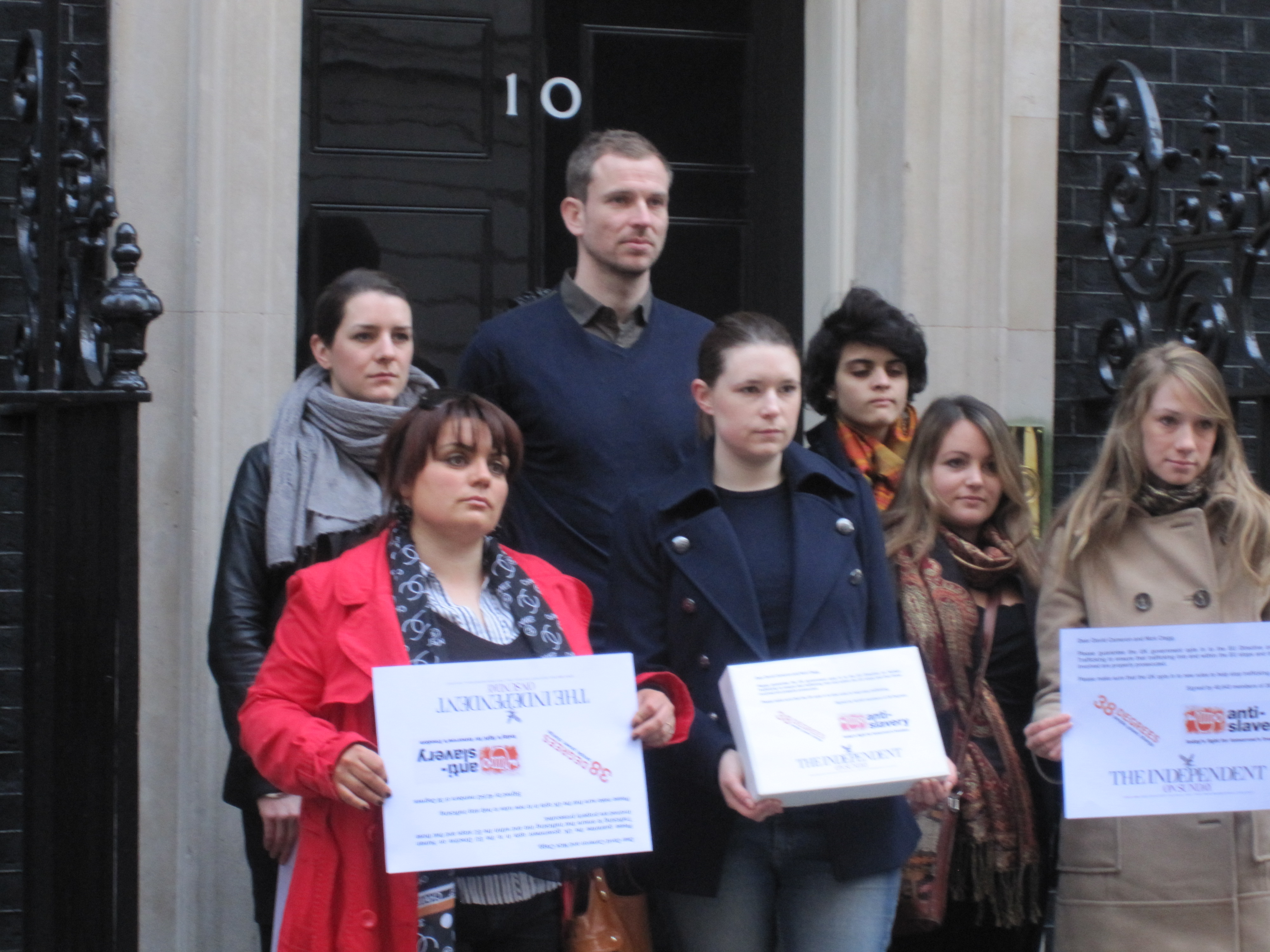
World Day Against Trafficking In Persons

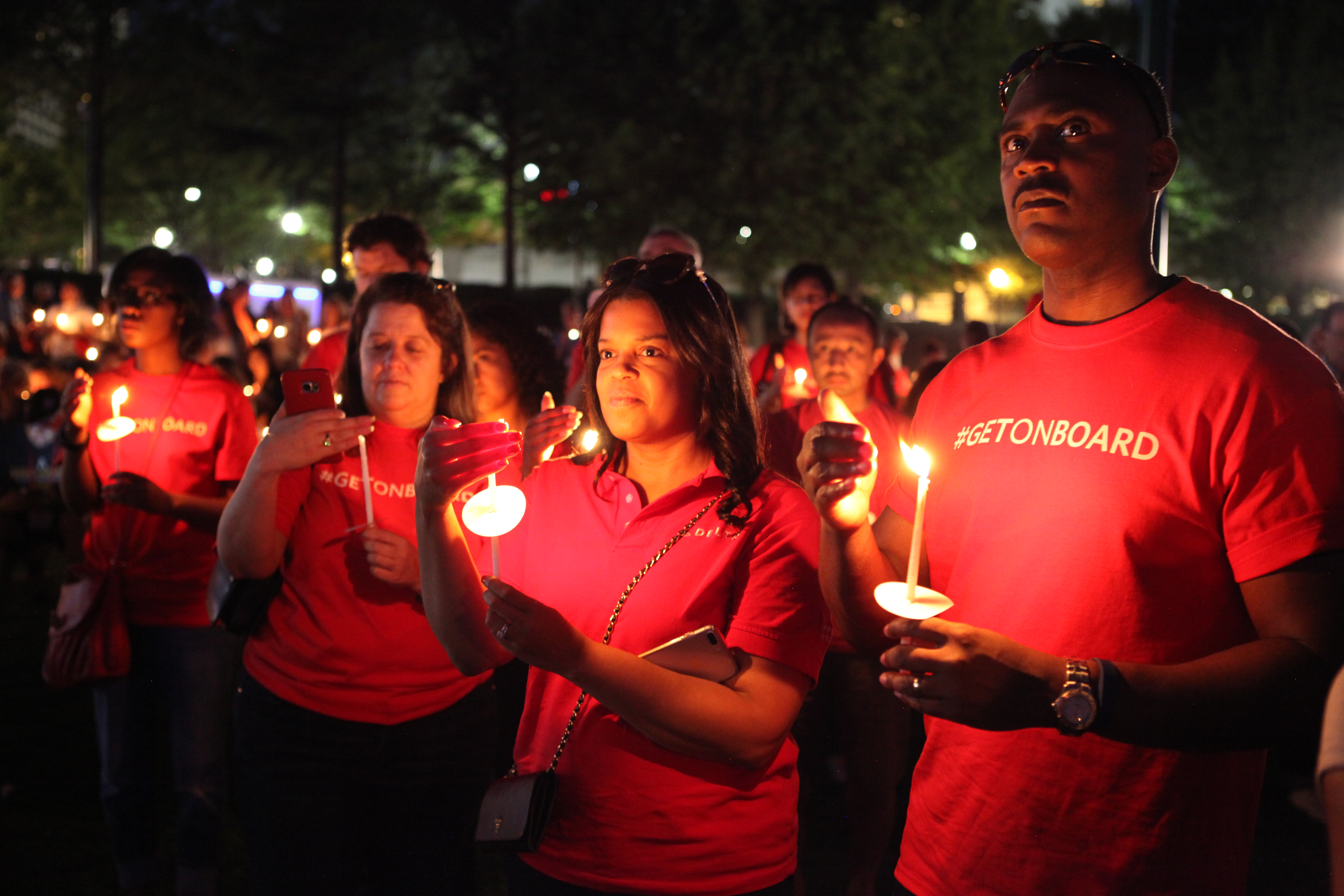
World Day Against Trafficking In Persons

The rate of human trafficking has directly increased in correlation with globalization. Globalization has increased cross-border trade and the demand for cheap labor; however, migration policies of the U.S. and other countries have not changed with the level of demand for cheap labor, thus forcing people illegally to immigrate. Illegal immigration then creates ideal conditions for organized criminal operations to form trafficking circles. With increased trade of foreign goods to rural areas, import competition in the rural markets has also forced people in poor areas to migrate to industrialized economies for better livelihoods. Their desperate positions often make them subject to exploitation and trafficking into different forms of forced labor to support that economy. Lastly, the technological advances that go hand in hand with globalization have facilitated the ease with which organized crime circles may conduct trafficking operations.

=== Prostitution ===
Some feminists, such as Carole Pateman, believe that exploitation is in both prostitution and sex trafficking. They believe that even if the women agreed to be a sex worker in a foreign country that the worker was still trafficked because of the preceding conditions that lead her to believe that sex work was the only viable work option. Other feminists such as Kamala Kempadoo, on the other hand, believe that prostitution is a form of labor just like any other migrant labor; however, due to the criminalization of prostitution, prostitutes are then subject to coercion and exploitation and subsequent trafficking. In the US, each year 80,000 women are arrested for prostitution. Current debates about modifications to the Trafficking Victims Protection Act of 2000 policy are based on these two arguments. In providing aid for victims of sex trafficking the government must take a stand on whether or not they believe the sex industry and sex trafficking are inherently linked. These people involved in prostitution have an 80% higher chance of sexually transmitted infections and many are never able to afford to seek treatment. This results in serious infections, lifelong diseases, and sometimes even death.

=== Fear of government corruption ===
Even though the U.S. offers protection for trafficking victims, few victims seek the government's aid due to fear of corruption, fear of deportation, or fear of reprisals from their families. Victims of trafficking may be citizens of countries with corrupt governments that actually aid trafficking. Where victims' home countries lack reliable police systems, trafficking victims are hesitant to reach out to the law for aid. Jessa Dillow Crisp was one of many victims of human trafficking, who had encountered the police in her town to be corrupt and involved in the trafficking.

== Anti-trafficking laws and policies ==
Laws against trafficking exist at the federal and state levels. Government efforts focus on regulating the tourism industry to prevent the facilitation of sex tourism and regulate international marriage brokers to ensure criminal background checks and information on how to get help are given to potential brides.

=== State laws ===
Washington State and Texas were the first states to ban human trafficking as a specific offense in 2003. By 2015, all 50 states had such laws. Some states, such as California, actively prosecute such crimes, but in most states, these laws are seldom used, and most offenses are prosecuted at the federal level.

=== Federal laws ===
Human trafficking is a federal crime under Title 18 of the United States Code. Section 1584 makes it a crime to force a person to work against her or his will, or to sell a person into a condition of involuntary servitude.

Section 1581 similarly makes it illegal to force a person to work through "debt servitude". Human trafficking as it relates to involuntary servitude and slavery is prohibited by the 13th Amendment. Federal laws on human trafficking are enforced by the Federal Bureau of Investigation, the United States Marshal Service, the Drug Enforcement Administration, the Immigration and Customs Enforcement, the United States Department of Justice Civil Rights Division and Criminal Section, and other federal agencies.

==== Federal Response and task forces ====
Federal efforts to combat human trafficking are coordinated across multiple agencies under the framework established by the Trafficking Victims Protection Act and its subsequent reauthorizations In fiscal year 2024, the Department of Justice provided approximately $22 million to support 15 Enhanced Collaborative Model anti-trafficking task forces, which paired states and local law enforcement agencies with victim service providers, an increase from $19 million supporting 10 such task forces in fiscal year 2023.

The Department of Health and Human Services awarded more than $2.9 million in fiscal year 2023 for case management services to domestic victims, with funded recipients serving 823 trafficking victims across eight states.

Federal agencies are also exploring how digital tools, including AI-assisted detection, can help identify trafficking patterns and trends, while basic communication channels such as SMS lines and messaging apps offer lower tech options for victims who cannot safely make a phone call to reach assistance.

==== Victims of Trafficking and Violence Protection Act ====
The Victims of Trafficking and Violence Protection Act of 2000 allowed for greater statutory maximum sentences for traffickers, provided resources for the protection of and assistance for victims of trafficking, and created avenues for interagency cooperation. It also allows many trafficking victims to remain in the U.S. and apply for permanent residency under a T-1 Visa. Previously, trafficked individuals who were often in the country illegally were treated as criminals. According to the section on Severe Forms of Trafficking in Persons, the definition extends to include any "commercial sex act... in which the person induced to perform such act has not attained 18 years of age". This means that any minor engaged in prostitution is a victim of human trafficking, regardless of citizenship or whether or not movement has taken place.

The law defines trafficking as "the prohibition against any individual who provides or obtains labor or services for peonage, slavery, involuntary servitude, or forced labor." The law distinguishes trafficking, where victims are coerced into entering the U.S., from smuggling, where migrants enter the country without authorization. The act also attempted to encourage efforts to prevent human trafficking internationally, by creating annual country reports on trafficking and tying financial non-humanitarian assistance to foreign countries to real efforts in addressing human trafficking. The benefits of the law, however, are dependent on the survivor's cooperation in prosecuting the perpetrators. This can be complicated if the victim fears retribution from their trafficker or has a fear of authority that remains from their country of origin.

The original TVPA of 2000 has been reauthorized thrice, the most recent being the William Wilberforce Trafficking Victims Protection Reauthorization Act of 2008. These reauthorizations have clarified definitions of trafficking and forced labor in order both to aid in the prosecution of traffickers and to aid the victims of trafficking. The reauthorization versions have also required the federal government to terminate all contracts with overseas contractors involved in human trafficking or forced labor. Extraterritorial jurisdiction was also extended to cover all U.S. nationals and permanent residents who are living overseas.

In "October 2000, the Trafficking Victims Protection Act of 2000 (TVPA) (Public Law 106-386) was enacted. Prior to that, no comprehensive Federal law existed to protect victims of trafficking or to prosecute their traffickers". In 2003, the Bush administration authorized more than $200 million (~$335 million in 2025) to combat human trafficking through the Trafficking Victims Protection Reauthorization Act of 2003 (TVPRA). TVPRA renews the U.S. government's commitment to identify and assist victims exploited through labor and sex trafficking in the U.S. The U.S. has also set up programs to help those who have been victims. The government can help victims, once identified, by stabilizing their immigrant status. The Department of Health and Human Services (HHS) enables victims who are non-U.S. citizens to receive federally funded benefits and services to the same extent as a refugee; as well, U.S. citizens who are victims are eligible for many benefits.

The U visa is available to individuals who have been victims of specific qualifying criminal acts, such as domestic violence, human trafficking, sexual assault, and hate crimes. Once granted, the U visa allows victims to remain and work legally in the United States for up to four years and can be extended in certain situations. Victims who meet specific requirements can apply for lawful permanent residency, also known as a Green Card. Eligibility for both T visas and U visas requires the victim to assist or cooperate with law enforcement in the detection, investigation, or prosecution of human trafficking or qualifying criminal activity. Some exceptions and exemptions apply for victims who were under 18 years of age or who have suffered physical or psychological trauma. Exceptions and special rules also exist for U visa applicants who are under 16 years of age or are incompetent or incapacitated.

The T visa provides T nonimmigrant status as a temporary immigration benefit to individuals who are victims of severe human trafficking and have complied with law enforcement requests or qualify for an exemption. Certain family members may also be eligible for derivative T nonimmigrant status. As a T nonimmigrant status holder, individuals can work and receive certain benefits, and may also be able to become lawful permanent residents if they meet specific requirements. Qualifying family members who may be eligible to apply for T nonimmigrant status include parents, unmarried siblings under 18 years of age, and children of any age or marital status of your qualifying family members who have been granted derivative T nonimmigrant status.

==== Resources and support services ====
The primary federal resource for victims and witnesses is the National Human Trafficking Hotline, reachable at 1-888-373-7888. The hotline operates 24 hours a day, seven days a week, in more than 200 languages, and accepts contacts by phone, text, online chat, and email. Individuals who cannot safely make a phone call may text "BeFree" to 233733 to reach hotline staff via the BeFree Textile. Twenty-five states have mandated certain businesses to post the hotline number visibly on their premises.

The Department of Homeland Security's Center for Countering Human Trafficking also acceprs anonymous tips online and by phone at 1-866-347-2423. In fiscal year 2024, DHS agencies assisted more than 800 trafficking victims, granted protections to more than 24,000 victims and their family members, and made more than 2,500 trafficking related arrests. DHS personnel also supported 914 human trafficking related indictments and 405 convictions and trained thousands of DHS employees, law enforcement personnel, and private sector workers in recognizing and reporting suspected cases.

The National Center for Missing and Exploited Children (NCMEC) operates a 24 hour missing children's hotline, a CyberTipline for reports of online sexual exploitation, and a Child Victim Identification program to help authorities identify child victims in abuse material.

The Department of Justice's Office for Victims of Crime funds hundreds of human trafficking service grantees nationwide. Between October 2023 and September 2024, 288 OVC human trafficking grantees provided services to an average of 10,505 clients per quarter.

The Department of Health and Human Services maintains the SOAR (Stop, Observe, Ask, Respond) training program, designed to equip healthcare providers with the tools to identify and appropriately respond to potential trafficking victims, since survivors frequently encounter medical professionals while still being exploited.

==== Safe harbor laws ====
Safe harbor laws protect victims of human trafficking from legal prosecution of crimes committed while under the influence of the trafficker and provide services such as counseling and housing and protect them from their exploiters. Victims of trafficking are protected under federal law but may still be charged under state law.

The federal Stop Exploitation Through Trafficking Act of 2013 is a law that encourages states to pass safe harbor laws. It elevated the status of the National Human Trafficking Hotline and opened up the Job Corps program to sex trafficking victims.

== Health professionals ==
The AMA and antislavery advocacy groups ask doctors and health professionals to look out for possible victims of human trafficking as most get to health care services at some time. Healthcare services have the chance to rescue them.

Research shows that trafficking survivors encounter health providers while they are exploited, yet many healthcare professionals fail to identify these patients. Healthcare workers at many medical facilities do not receive proper education about trafficking signs. The U.S. Department of Health and Human Services created the SOAR (Stop, Observe, Ask, Respond) training program to educate providers about recognizing potential trafficking cases while helping them respond appropriately. Additionally, organizations like HEAL provides toolkits and resources enabling healthcare professionals to acquire appropriate skills for supporting victims.

== Opposition organizations ==
- Coalition Against Trafficking in Women (CATW): influences shaping of U.S. policy against trafficking. Does not acknowledge a difference between prostitution and sex trafficking.
- Global Alliance Against Traffic in Women (GAATW): influences shaping of U.S. policy against trafficking. Distinguishes between prostitution and sex trafficking.
- Real Women Real Stories is an international collection of filmed testimonies of women around the world, who submit, share and discuss different contents and topics about human trafficking. In the US alone, Real Women Real Stories and its founder Matan Uziel donated more than $5.5 million as of January 2022 to human trafficking victims.
- The Trafficking Education Network focuses on educating and training people, so they are better equipped to respond to human trafficking.
- Worthwhile Wear is an international organization that provides an escape for those forced into prostitution or human trafficking. Overseas, survivors are provided vocational training and employment where they can learn to make items such as clothing, bags, and jewelry, and earn up to five times more than their counterparts. This provides the women with a way to stay out of forced prostitution. In the US, Worthwhile Wear operates a program called, The Well, offering long-term housing (up to two years), restorative services, and employment to women, 18 years and older, who have been affected by human trafficking.

International NGOs such as Human Rights Watch and Amnesty International have called on the U.S. to improve its measures aimed at reducing trafficking. They recommend that the U.S. more fully implement the United Nations Convention against Transnational Organized Crime Protocol to Prevent, Suppress and Punish Trafficking in Persons, especially Women and Children and for immigration officers to improve their awareness of trafficking and support the victims of trafficking.

== As a moral panic ==
A number of authorities and critics of contemporary anti-prostitution activism have pointed out that the hysteria over human trafficking as conflated with voluntary adult prostitution has all the hallmarks of a moral panic, and indeed closely resembles the white slavery hysteria at the beginning of the 20th century. As is typical in such panics, broad claims are made with insufficient factual support, "horror stories" of victims take the place of research, and legislators rush to enact dangerously broad and vague legislation which infringes on civil rights.

Anthropologist Laura Agustín has written at great length about the way voluntary migration is purposefully conflated with involuntary trafficking, and how anti-trafficking laws tend to assume any foreign or underage prostitute is a "trafficking victim" even if she denies it. In a similar vein, ethnographers studying U.S.-born adolescents involved in street-based sex markets have argued that the relationships that these adolescents have with the adults in their lives who help facilitate their market activity typically have a far greater mutuality and equality than is understood by policy-makers, social service providers, and not-for-profit advocates who embrace the human trafficking model. Such critiques of this narrative have generally been dismissed by activists as evidence of Stockholm syndrome, thus denying the prostitute agency and treating her as mentally ill.

Ethnographers concerned with the validity of activists' impressions studied a federal anti-trafficking task force in a city that had been identified as a hub for domestic minor sex trafficking. In comparing local sex markets with the understandings of local social service providers, law enforcement officials, and anti-trafficking activists participating in the task force they found that many of the claims of widespread trafficking activity were either exaggerations or misinterpretations of anecdotal evidence; thus, calling into question activists' ability to understand the context of what they were seeing.

== Media ==
- "Sixteen Tons" is a song by Tennessee Ernie Ford about debt bondage under the truck system among coal miners in Kentucky in the early 1900s. The practice was since made illegal and is considered a form of labor trafficking.
- Mommie Dearest; "Joan Crawford['s]... Mommie Dearest daughter supposedly came from the Tennessee Children's Home Society." (Note: Joan Crawford, a subject of Mommie Dearest)

=== Documentaries ===
- California's Forgotten Children is a feature documentary that follows a diverse group of resilient survivors of child sex trafficking who are now courageous leaders fighting for the rights of victims worldwide. The film supports the stories of survivors with current statistics and perspectives of sexual exploitation from professionals in social services, law enforcement, advocates, and child welfare. It focuses on those who were wrongfully criminalized in the judicial system; manipulated and coerced by family, friends, and caretakers; and exploited by multiple slavery industries.
- I am Jane Doe is a documentary chronicling the legal battle that several American mothers are waging on behalf of their middle-school daughters, who were trafficked for commercial sex on Backpage.com, the classified advertising website formerly owned by the Village Voice. The film is narrated by Jessica Chastain, directed by filmmaker Mary Mazzio, and produced by Mazzio along with Alec Sokolow.
- The Men of Atalissa is a documentary film by POV.org and The New York Times about 32 intellectually challenged people who were employed by Texas-based Henry's Turkey Service without proper compensation, and were abused physically and mentally, living in harsh conditions, at Atalissa, Iowa, for more than 30 years beginning in the 1970s. The men were paid a wage of $65 a month, sheltered in an old uphill schoolhouse, and were used for meat processing. Their conditions were made public in 2009, leading to a $240 million jury verdict, subsequently reduced to $50,000 per person. The documentary is based on court records and internal documents of the company and features first-time interviews with seven of the victims.

== Trafficking hubs ==
California, Florida, New York, Nevada, Ohio and Texas are main hubs of human trafficking in the United States because of their “proximity to international borders, number of ports and airports, significant immigrant population, and large economy that includes industries that attract forced labor”.

== Policy of state governments ==
Several state governments have taken action to address human trafficking within their borders, through either legislation or prevention activities. For example, Florida state law prohibits forced labor, sex trafficking, and domestic servitude and provides for mandatory law enforcement training and victim services. A 2006 Connecticut law prohibits coerced work and makes trafficking a violation of the Connecticut RICO Act. Washington State was the first to pass a law criminalizing human trafficking in 2003.

=== Arizona ===
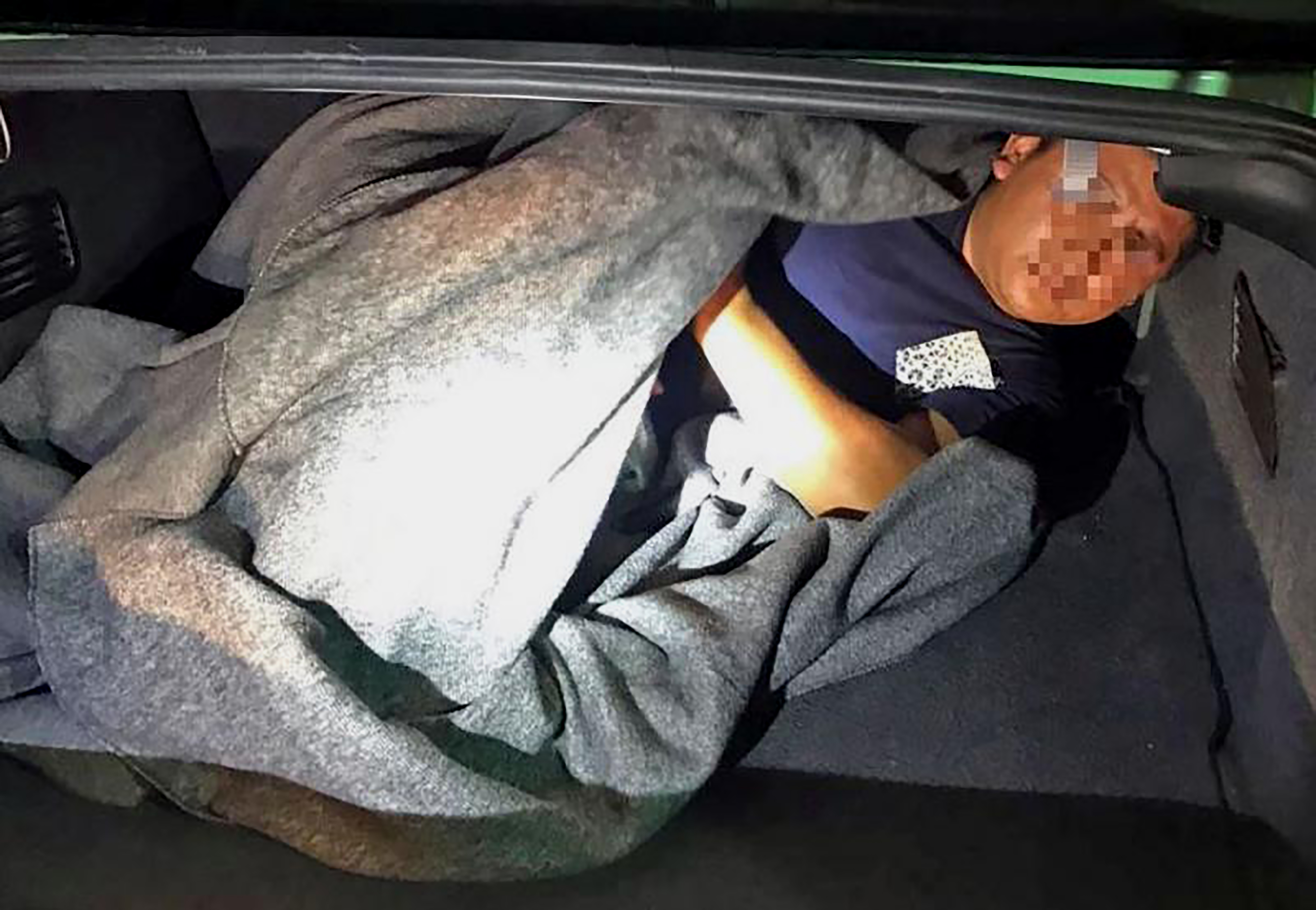
A vehicle, human trafficking (Arizona)

According to the U.S. State Department, Arizona is a main destination and transit point for labor and sex trafficking, both nationally and internationally. Some contributing factors include its proximity to Mexico, San Diego, and Las Vegas, its warm weather, its network of freeways, and that it is a major conference destination, and home to many professional sporting events. The Great Recession also hit Phoenix particularly hard, leading to a spike in homeless youth who are vulnerable to human traffickers. Cindy McCain has raised awareness of human trafficking in Arizona and across the United States and served as co-chair of the Arizona Governor Jan Brewer's Task Force on Human Trafficking.

==== Laws ====
- Sex Trafficking: classification (AZ) – Arizona legislation that defines what sex trafficking is. States that it is illegal to recruit, entice, harbor, transport, provide or obtain by any means another person with the intent of causing the other person to engage in prostitution by force, fraud, or coercion. If a person is under the age of eighteen, it is illegal to entice, harbor, transport, provide, or obtain by any means that person with the intent of causing that person to engage in prostitution.
- Trafficking of Persons for Forced Labor or Services; classifications; definitions (AZ) – Arizona legislation that defines labor trafficking as "transport another person or to entice, recruit, harbor, provide or otherwise obtain another person for transport by deception, coercion or force,". Also states that it is illegal to knowingly traffic another person or benefit from the trafficking of another person for labor or services.
- Unlawfully Obtaining Labor or Services; classification (AZ) – Arizona legislation making it illegal to obtain labor or services through the use of bodily harm, threatening or restraining victim, and/or withholding victim's personal records.

==== Organizations ====
- Arizona League to End Regional Trafficking (ALERT) is a coalition representing partnerships with law enforcement, faith-based communities, non-profit organizations, social service agencies, attorneys, and concerned citizens. ALERT helps victims of trafficking by providing: food and shelter; medical care; mental health counseling; immigration assistance; legal assistance; language interpretation; case management; and other culturally appropriate services throughout the state of Arizona.
- MOMA's House is an organization based in Laveen that helps female victims recover from sex trafficking by providing shelter, a supportive environment, and a program to help them develop life and career skills.
- The Underage Sex-Trafficking Coalition was formed in 2011 by the Arizona Attorney General. It seeks to raise public awareness, educate the community and advocate to strengthen laws about human trafficking. It began the Arizona's Not Buying It Campaign, in partnership with Shared Hope International, to fight child sex trafficking.
- Training and Resources United to Stop Trafficking (TRUST) focuses on raising awareness about human trafficking through training and providing resources.

=== California ===
California is particularly vulnerable because of its "proximity to international borders, number of ports and airports, significant immigrant population, and large economy that includes industries that attract forced labor." It serves both as an entry point for slaves imported from outside the US as well as a destination for slaves. Slavery is found throughout California, but major hubs are centered around Los Angeles, San Diego, and San Francisco.

In 2011, California enacted a new law called the "Transparency in Supply Chains Act". The law requires certain retailers to disclose their efforts to eradicate slavery and human trafficking from their supply chains. The law went into effect on January 1, 2012, and it applies to any company that is in the "retail trade" that has annual worldwide gross receipts in excess of $100 million and annual California sales exceeding $500,000.

The National Human Trafficking Hotline reports that California has the largest number of human trafficking cases each year in America. The hotline received a total of 3,152 signals in California in 2023 which led to identifying 1,128 cases of human trafficking. Most reports were received via phone calls and SMS, amounting to 1,876 and 841 signals.

State and local governments have intensified ongoing efforts to combat trafficking. The California Department of Justice, alongside task forces such as the San Diego Human Trafficking Task Force (SDHTTF), have conduct large-scale operations. For example, in 2023, a joint operation led by SDHTTF led to the arrest of over 46 traffickers and the rescue of 20 victims, several of whom were minors.

==== Organizations ====
- The Coalition to Abolish Slavery and Trafficking: works to assist persons trafficked for the purpose of forced labor and slavery-like practices and to work toward ending all instances of such human rights violations.
- The Thai Community Development Center's Slavery Eradication and Rights Initiative works to raise awareness of human trafficking and provide survivor support

=== Florida ===
Florida ranks among the top three states for human trafficking with California and Texas, placing among the nation's top three. The reason for high reports is linked to a large number of immigrants, tourism, agricultural production and the high volume of ships and passengers entering through international ports. The National Human Trafficking Hotline's records from 2023 found that Florida received 2,245 signals involving human trafficking. As a result, 896 significant cases were investigated, including both sex and labor trafficking and 1,655 victims were identified.

Several efforts have been made by local and state agencies such as the Florida Department of Children and Families (DCF) and the Office of the Attorney General, including providing assistance to victims and data collection efforts. While the DCF oversees the Statewide Council on Human Trafficking, law enforcement, child welfare, legal services and survivors are represented on the council. All Florida law enforcement officers must receive specialized instruction on how to spot and react to human trafficking. In addition, healthcare providers, hotel employees and massage therapists are required to learn about signs of trafficking as part of their training needed for licensing (Florida Statutes, Section 787.06).

In May 2024, Florida outlined new plans to better protect the state against human trafficking, including spending $4.9 million to allow trafficking survivors more room in shelters. Initiatives such as HB 7063 increase punishment for those involved in human trafficking, requires traffic warning signs in state-owned buildings and disallows the hiring of minors in adult entertainment clubs. Among the measures, HB 1127 aims to improve the services for victims, raise the punishment for traffickers and help prevent child exploitation in the state.

=== Georgia ===
State policy: Georgia law OCGA 16-5-46 prohibits the trafficking of persons for labor or sexual servitude with a more severe penalty for trafficking minors.

Other related laws: On April 2, 2015, a new law was passed called the SB8 and SR7. Under this law, convicted traffickers will register as sex offenders and pay into a state fund called New Safe Harbor to help victims of sex trafficking with physical, and mental health, education, job training, and legal help.

HB 200 law went into effect on July 1, 2011. The law is harsher when it involves minors and can be up to a twenty-year prison sentence and a $100,000 fine. Another major step is that the age of consent, which is sixteen, or lack of knowledge of the victim's age is no longer a valid defense.

Major issues: Atlanta is now a major transportation hub when it comes to trafficking young girls from Mexico and is one of the fourteen U.S. cities with the highest levels of sex trafficking of children.

In 2007, the sex trade generated $290 million (~$433 million in 2025) in Atlanta.

Craigslist is a major medium for advertisement for sex and the site is known to get three hits per day.

Since Atlanta has "the same ready access to commercial air and ground routes that draws businesses and travelers to Atlanta also entices criminals engaged in human trafficking". There are numerous events and conventions in Atlanta that bring many people to the city which also exemplifies the issue.

Organizations: Out of Darkness is an organization that is against sex trafficking which is located in Atlanta, Georgia; Out of Darkness falls under section 501(c)(3). Their "mission is to reach, rescue and restore all victims of commercial sexual exploitation, that the glory of God may be known."

BeLoved Atlanta is an organization that focuses on the "community of women who have survived trafficking, prostitution, and addiction". BeLoved Atlanta will provide a residential home to adult women who were personally affected by sexual exploitation, they are able to provide their services to residents for up to two years.

End It "is a coalition of the leading organizations in the world to fight for freedom". Their mission is to shine a light on all forms of slavery. End it "Partners are doing the work, on the ground, every day, to bring AWARENESS, PREVENTION, RESCUE, and RESTORATION."

Not For Sale is a nonprofit organization that combats human trafficking through enterprise-driven solutions, including job training, economic development, and life skills programs. Founded in San Francisco in 2007, the organization operates programs across the United States and internationally.

=== Illinois ===
Illinois, and Chicago, in particular, represents one of the most significant trafficking hub in the Midwest due to its large population, O'Hare International Airport, one of the busiest in the world and its position as a major interstate transportation corridor. In 2024, 792 signals were received by the National Human Trafficking Hotline from Illinois, 219 of which came from victims or survivors themselves, resulting in 385 identified cases involving 627 victims.

In 2024, over 440 human trafficking survivors and more than 200 possible case of child trafficking were reported to Illinois authorities. In response, Governor JB Pritzker signed Senate Bill 2323, the Illinois Statewide Trauma-Informed Response to Human Trafficking Act, which established new human trafficking task force in areas lacking them, required additional training for state attorneys prosecuting trafficking cases, and aligned penalties for child labor trafficking with those already in place for child sex trafficking.

=== Michigan ===
In 2006, Governor Jennifer Granholm signed House Bill 5747 (introduced by Rep. Phil Pavlov (R)) which specifically outlawed human trafficking in Michigan. The relevant state statutes are sections 750.462a to 750.462i. Effective April 1, 2011, an additional statute, 750.462j was enacted, which set grounds for further prosecution in human trafficking cases.

=== Nevada ===
In 2013, Nevada passed Assembly Bill 67, which uses the federal definition of sex trafficking and increases penalties by one level. It makes victims eligible for state assistance and allows them to sue their traffickers. Sex traffickers will have to register as sex offenders, and their assets will be seized to pay for victim services.

==== Legal brothels ====
Prostitution of adults is legal in 11 rural counties in Nevada. By creating false identification, outside pimps can use these brothels to traffic children. Detective Greg Harvey, from Eugene, Oregon, said such cases were in reality very common; he said, "It's happening right now, it's amazing how many girls are shipped from here to different brothels in northern and southern Nevada. Many are underage." Another detective, Sgt. Pete Kerns supported Harvey's claims: "Never buy the line that nobody under 18 works in (Nevada brothels)," he said. "It's happening."

In her 2007 report Prostitution and trafficking in Nevada: making the connections, Melissa Farley presents the results of numerous interviews with brothel owners and prostitutes; she says that most brothel prostitutes are controlled by outside pimps and that they suffer widespread abuse by brothel owners and customers. Bob Herbert supports the claim, stating: "Despite the fiction that they are "independent contractors", most so-called legal prostitutes have pimps – the state-sanctioned pimps who run the brothels and, in many cases, a second pimp who controls all other aspects of their lives (and takes the bulk of their legal earnings)."

Alexa Albert says that the trafficking is done in cooperation with brothel owners, so the prostitutes will be easier to control. Assemblyman Bob L. Beers said that "A brothel owner is somebody who, when it gets down to the very essence, is nothing more than a slave-owner." Former Nye County Commissioner Candice Trummell, director of the Nevada Coalition Against Sex Trafficking, said, "It is way past time for Nevada to be the last state in the United States of America to finally stand against all forms of slavery."

In 2009, an article in the Guardian stated that some Nevada counties and towns "impose some extraordinary restrictions on commercial sex workers" in order to "separate sex workers from the local community": some places forbid prostitutes to leave the brothels for extended periods of time, while other jurisdictions require the prostitutes to leave the county when they are not working; some places do not allow the children of the women who work in the brothels to live in the same area; some brothel workers are not permitted to leave the brothel after 5pm; in some counties registered sex workers are not allowed to have cars at all. Another former prostitute who worked in four Nevada brothels attacked the system, saying, "Under this system, prostitutes give up too much autonomy, control and choice over their work and lives" and "While the brothel owners love this profitable solution, it can be exploitative and is unnecessary". She described how the women were subject to various exaggerated restrictions, including making it very difficult for them to refuse clients and having to deal with doctors who had a "patronizing or sexist attitude" (the brothels discouraged and, in many cases, forbade prostitutes to see doctors of their own choosing).

==== Las Vegas ====
Although illegal, 90% of prostitution in Nevada occurs in Las Vegas. In 2009 Las Vegas was identified by the FBI as one of 14 cities in the U.S. with high rates of child prostitution. Las Vegas police claimed that "roughly 400 children are picked off the streets from prostitution each year." The U.S. Justice Department has also named Las Vegas among the 17 most likely destinations for human trafficking. Shared Hope International says Las Vegas is a major hub for child sex trafficking, in part because of the hyper-sexualized entertainment industry, easy access to alcohol and drugs, and 24-hour gambling.

=== Minnesota ===
- Breaking Free provides various services to prostitutes, such as help finding a place to live and a job outside the sex industry. The motto of the organization is "sisters helping sisters break free".
- Mission 21, an organization based in Rochester, provides services for child prostitutes and human trafficking victims who are younger than 16 years old, and refers those 16 and older to Breaking Free.

=== New York ===
==== Laws ====
- New York State Safe Harbour for Exploited Children Act was created in 2008. It gives exploited children protection from the Family Court and access to services.
- The New York State Anti-trafficking law was created in 2007. It created the crimes of Labor Trafficking and Sex Trafficking, provides immunity for victims, and gives benefits and services to the victims.

==== Organizations ====
- Girls Educational and Mentoring Services (GEMS) is a non-profit organization that provides services to commercially sexually exploited and domestically trafficked girls and young women, typically underage youth exploited by pimps and traffickers. The organization was founded in 1998 by Rachel Lloyd and is based in Harlem, New York City. The organization has helped several hundred young girls transition out of the sex industry and get back to their full potential. They also participated in lobbying for passage of the Safe Harbor Act for Sexually Exploited Youth, which provides that girls under the age of 16, who are arrested in New York for prostitution will be treated as victims, rather than criminals. The bill was signed into law in September 2008. The work of GEMS is the subject of the 2007 documentary Very Young Girls.
- New York State Anti-Trafficking Coalition is an umbrella group of more than 140 anti-trafficking organizations and works towards raising public awareness, passing laws, improving law enforcement, and providing services to victims of human trafficking. Together with Sanctuary for Families it launched New York's New Abolitionists campaign to raise awareness of human trafficking.

=== North Carolina ===
North Carolina's combination of a large agricultural sector, significant rural labor demand and an extensive highway network running through the Southeast has made it a notable location for both labor and sex trafficking. Labor trafficking in the state largely mirrors patterns seen elsewhere in the South, with migrant farmworkers on H-2A visas particularly vulnerable to debt bondage and employer coercion.

=== Ohio ===
The Ohio Human Trafficking Task Force was created by executive order on March 29, 2012. It coordinates efforts between 11 departments to identify and rescue victims, coordinate the investigation of human trafficking cases, and provide services and treatment for victims. Since then, Ohio has spent $2 million on programs for trafficking victims. Franklin County Municipal Court Judge Paul Herbert established a program called Changing Actions to Change Habits (CATCH court), which is a two-year probation program for adult victims of human trafficking that allows them to have their prior convictions dismissed.

Ohio is particularly vulnerable to human trafficking because it has both large urban centers and rural counties and a large transient and immigrant population, as well as five major highways with easy access to other states and Canada. 24 out of 88 counties have no human-trafficking training or access to victim services. 1,078 Ohio children are victims of human sex trafficking every year. Toledo is the fourth largest recruitment site for human trafficking in the US.

In 2015, when a human trafficking ring was uncovered in Marion, law enforcement discovered that the Department of Health and Human Services failed to perform basic background checks and placed numerous children with human traffickers.

==== Laws ====
H.B. 262 (The Ohio Human Trafficking Act of 2012) raised the penalty for committing the crime of human trafficking to a first-degree felony with a mandatory minimum sentence of 10–15 years, created a diversion program for juvenile victims to receive protection and treatment, and allows for adult victims of human trafficking with prior convictions of prostitution or solicitation to have their records expunged.

==== Organizations ====
- Central Ohio Rescue and Restore is an organization that provides "a collaborative community response to human trafficking in central Ohio through education, services, advocacy, and prosecution."
- Summit County Collaborative Against Human Trafficking is an organization centered in Summit County that seeks to increase awareness of human trafficking.

=== Oregon ===
The state of Oregon began to crack down on laws regarding Human Trafficking. In May 2013, the Multnomah County District Attorney's formed a Human Trafficking Team also known as (HTT). The HTT consists of "three highly skilled Deputy District Attorneys and a Victim Advocate. These team members are strategically placed in order to maximize their impacts on human trafficking specifically the Multnomah County." The role of the HTT is to protect victims utilizing a three-prong approach, (1) aggressively prosecuting those who engage in human trafficking; (2) reducing demand for exploitation in all its forms; and (3) ensuring adequate protection and support for victims of human trafficking." Since 2013 the number of Human Trafficking Offenders Convicted had doubled in 2007.

According to Shared Hope International, in 2015, Oregon legislators considered a new bill that would apply to a commonly held courtroom protection for rape victims to victims of human trafficking. This bill is known as the House bill of 3040 which was an innovative approach to "hearsay exception for human trafficking victims." Yet, this bill did not pass, "despite significant local support." Committee Chair Senator Pronzanski committed at a public hearing to establish a work group that will further consider hearsay exceptions for sex trafficking cases.

“While Oregon has made commendable strides forward, forcing victims to face their traffickers from the witness stand only continues that terror. A victim should never have to choose between justice and restoration." Linda Smith, President and Founder of Shared Hope International said."

==== Organizations ====
- A Village for ONE is a Portland-based non-profit organization developed to serve children who have experienced commercial sexual exploitation. Their aim is to bring the talents and gifts of community members to create an opportunity to serve each child that has been impacted within the local community.
- Safety Compass is an organization based in Salem Oregon, their mission is to offer support for survivors of commercial sexual exploitation and sex trafficking navigating the criminal and social justice systems in the mid-Willamette Valley, Oregon. This organization offers in-person support for survivors, specialized training for professionals and community members, and advocacy during law enforcement interviews.
- The Trafficking Law Center provides free legal assistance to human trafficking victims and survivors. TLC provides direct legal services and referrals to pro bono attorneys. TLC offers trauma-informed training to lawyers, raises awareness about sex trafficking, educates lawmakers, and advocates for policy changes to support trafficking survivors.

=== Pennsylvania ===
Worthwhile Wear is an international organization that provides a way out of forced prostitution or human trafficking both overseas and in the US. In Pennsylvania, Worthwhile Wear operates a program called The Well, offering long-term housing (up to two years), restorative services, and employment to women, 18 years and older, who have been affected by human trafficking.

=== Tennessee ===
Thistle Farms provides a network of partnerships and communities committed to helping women survivors free themselves from the physical, emotional, and economic bondage of trafficking, addiction, prostitution, and poverty. They provide a sanctuary that helps women heal, opportunities to move survivors from vulnerability to employment and economic freedom, and create paths to rise against systems that commoditize, criminalize and abuse women.

=== Texas ===
==== Major U.S. hubs ====
The main factors that contribute to high levels of trafficking through Atlanta and Houston are proximity, demographics, and a large migrant labor force. The presence of two large airports provides ways in and out of the city in Houston and Atlanta hosts the world's busiest and largest airport by several measures. The likelihood of a high level of trafficking in Atlanta and Houston is supported by the fact that the majority of calls to National Trafficking Hotline come from The Atlanta Center and Houston.

==== Houston ====
Houston's proximity to the Mexican border, I-10, a highway running across the country through Houston, and the port of Houston make it a popular point of entry for international trafficking. Houston's huge geographic size and large Hispanic population create optimal conditions for trafficking because of the ability to blend in with the community. There are large Asian and Middle Eastern populations that allow traffickers and their victims to blend easily into local communities. Also, Texas businesses employ migrant labors in many different sectors throughout the state; such as textiles, agriculture, restaurants, construction, and domestic work. This vast diversity makes it difficult for law enforcement to concentrate on any one labor sector and be effective in ending human trafficking.

===== Types of trafficking found in Houston =====
The United States, the Trafficking Victims Protection Act of 2000 defines sex trafficking as the recruitment, harboring, transportation, provision, or obtaining of a person for the purpose of a commercial sex act, in which a commercial sex act is induced by force, fraud, or coercion, or in which the person forced to perform such an act is under the age of 18 years. Sex trafficking that occurs in Houston is not limited to taking place in strip clubs, spas, massage parlors, modeling studios, cantinas, and residential brothels in hotels, motels, apartments, and houses. Labor trafficking found in Houston maybe but is not limited to agricultural work, restaurants, nail salons, domestic servitude, peddling, begging, or traveling sales crew.

===== Quantity of trafficking in Texas =====
Based on a study released by Dallas Women's Foundation, sex trafficking of young girls is not an isolated phenomenon, but a widespread criminal activity in Texas. The research found that 740 girls under age 18 were documented being marketed for sex during a 30-day period in Texas, of whom 712 of these girls were being marketed through Internet classified web sites and 28 were being marketed through escort services. More information concluded from the research is that there are more girls being trafficked for sex in Texas during one month than there are women killed in domestic violence with former or current husbands, intimate partners or boyfriends in Texas over an entire year. There are more girls being trafficked for sex in Texas during one month than there are females of all ages who died from complications due to AIDS in one year in Texas. And finally, there are more girls being trafficked for sex in Texas during one month than there are teen girls who died by suicide, homicide, and accidents in the state in one year.

==== Laws and policies ====
There are several pieces of legislation in place in Texas working to combat human trafficking. Recent legislation passed in Texas mandates that all incoming local law enforcement receive training on human trafficking. In Houston specifically, one of the primary elements of the Juvenile Justice System in Harris County is the Juvenile Probation Department (HCJPD). HCJPD is "committed to the protection of the public, utilizing intervention strategies that are community-based, family-oriented and least restrictive while emphasizing responsibility and accountability of both parent and child". Feeding into HCJPD is the juvenile court system that includes five juvenile courts (each with a different judge presiding), a juvenile mental health court, and a juvenile drug court.

==== Organizations ====
1. The Coalition Against Human Trafficking: works to increase community awareness of human trafficking and coordinate the identification, assistance, and protection of victims through community education, advocacy, provision of culturally and linguistically sensitive victim services, and efforts to ensure the investigation and prosecution of human traffickers.
2. Mosaic Family Services operates the Services for Victims of Trafficking Program that provides culturally and linguistically competent services to victims experiencing abuse, so that they may quickly recover from a criminal act.
3. The Texas Association Against Sexual Assault: educates rape centers and domestic violence shelters throughout Texas about human trafficking.
4. Free the Captives is a Christian-based NGO that has objectives including educating the community, preventing, and intervening in the trafficking of at-risk teens, reducing the demand, and pursuing legal remedies to combat trafficking.
5. Houston Rescue and Restore: exists to prevent and confront modern-day slavery by educating the public, training professionals, and empowering the community to take action for the purpose of identifying, rescuing, and restoring trafficking victims to freedom.
6. CHILDREN AT RISK: works to end child trafficking and ensure those child victims are recognized as victims and not criminals.
7. Innocence Lost

=== Virginia ===
According to officials with the Federal Bureau of Investigation, Immigration and Customs Enforcement, and other law enforcement agencies, there is a growing problem with human trafficking in Virginia, particularly in connection with Latino gangs, including MS-13. Anti-human trafficking advocates argue that weak laws in Virginia are attracting traffickers from Washington, D.C., and Maryland which have passed stricter laws.

==== Laws ====
Before April 1, 2015, Virginia was the only state in the nation that did not have any standalone human trafficking laws. SB 1188 and HB 1964 were passed on April 1, 2015. They were the first bills in Virginia to define sex trafficking, establish penalties, criminalized child sex trafficking as a Class 3 felony without the need to prove force, intimidation, or deception, and criminalized recruitment for commercial sex. It also provides provisions for protecting and identifying sex trafficking victims. Robert Dillard was the first man charged under this law.

==== Organizations ====
- Freedom 4/24 is an organization based in Lynchburg, Virginia. Its mission is to raise awareness of human trafficking of women and children around the world and to provide financial support to other anti-human trafficking organizations. It sponsors Frocks 4 Freedom, an event selling discounted trendy fashion, and Run 4 Their Lives, a 5K race, to raise money for their anti-human trafficking work.
- Northern Virginia Human Trafficking Initiative (NOVA HTI) is an organization based in Ashburn, Virginia, that seeks to connect the community to fight human trafficking. It seeks to raise awareness, advocate for change in laws, and assist victims of human trafficking.
- The Gray Haven is an organization based in Richmond, Virginia, that focuses on helping victims of human trafficking. They operate a drop-in center for victims, have a crisis response team, offer case management, and have a court advocacy team. They work with local, state, and federal law enforcement to identify and provide service for victims.

=== Wisconsin ===
The State of Wisconsin has worked to address human trafficking by establishing a comprehensive task force co-chaired by Attorney General Brad Schimel and Secretary of Children and Families Eloise Anderson. An implementation committee was chaired by Jodi Emerson of the Fierce Freedom Organization. In 2017, the Wisconsin Department of Justice launched a Human Trafficking Bureau. There are five organizations in Wisconsin that are affiliated with human trafficking consortium efforts. These organizations include "Comprehensive Approaches to Youth who have been Sexually Exploited" (Milwaukee, Wisconsin), "Dana County Coordinated Community Response to the Commercial Sexual Exploitation of Children," "Fierce Freedom" (Eau Claire), "La Crosse Task Force to Eradicate Modern Slavery," and the Outagamie Human Trafficking Steering Committee.

== Consequences ==
=== Health impacts ===
Trafficked workers often face permanent physical and psychological damage as a result of their ordeal such as post traumatic stress disorder (PTSD) and other health problems. Child workers face especially serious consequences which may include a lack of education, illiteracy and stunted growth.

=== Economic impacts ===
Although the surface economic impact of labor trafficking can be seen as positive due to the cheap labor and a subsequent drop in the price of products, the negative economic impacts are significant. The unseen costs of labor trafficking can include resources dedicated to its prevention, treatment of victims and apprehension of perpetrators. This type of trafficking also diverts earnings from workers and their families to employers. However, labor trafficking continues to be a primary source of income for criminal networks.

== History ==
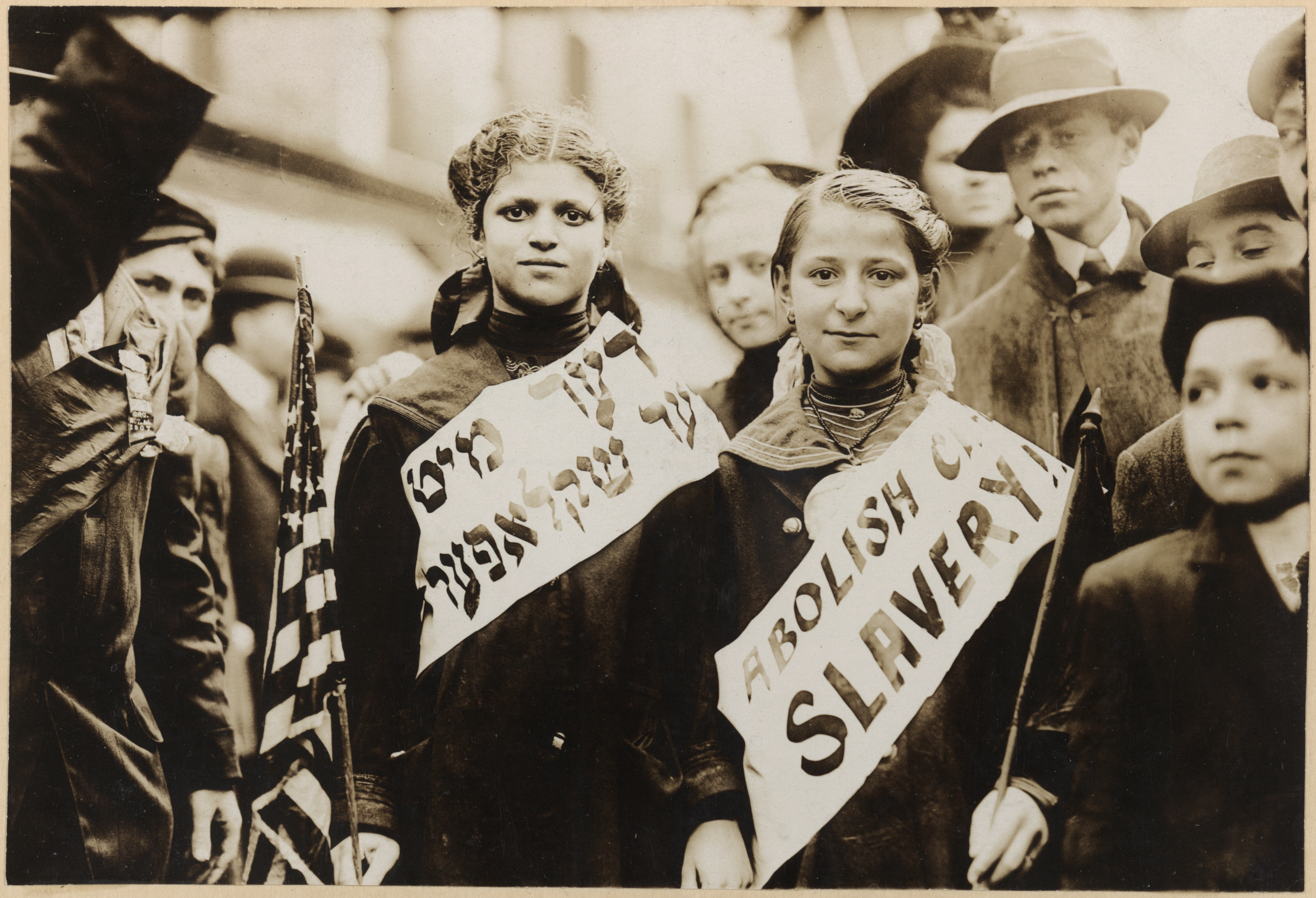
Child slavery

In 1865, the Civil War was ended and the Emancipation Proclamation took full effect, freeing the slaves in the formerly Confederate-held territory. Later that same year, the 13th Amendment was passed, therefore officially outlawing the practice of slavery. A second section of this amendment allowing the government to enforce and pass laws to ensure the 13th amendment was upheld, but the ultimate end to the practice of slavery as defined by the amendment took many years to become realized, with many alternative forms of slavery still being practiced (i.e. sharecropping, peonage, convict leasing).

== Causes ==
There is currently little knowledge as to the causes of trafficking. In the United States, human trafficking is a criminal activity thought to exist because of high demand, high profit and low risks.

== Prisoners ==
In Texas, Georgia, Alabama and Arkansas, prisoners are not paid at all for their work. In other states, prisoners are paid between $0.12 and $1.15 per hour. Federal Prison Industries paid inmates an average of $0.90 per hour in 2017. Inmates that refuse to work may be indefinitely remanded into solitary confinement, or have family visitation revoked. From 2010 to 2015 and again in 2016 and in 2018, some prisoners in the US refused to work, protesting for better pay, better conditions, and for the end of forced labor. Strike leaders were punished with indefinite solitary confinement.

== See also ==
- Child selling, regarding sales for adoption
- Commercial sexual exploitation of children in the United States
- Contemporary slavery
- Feminist views on prostitution
- List of Goods Produced by Child Labor or Forced Labor
- Penal labor in the United States
