= Operation Coyote =

United States Department of Homeland Security

- Part of Human trafficking in the United States
Date	June–September 2014
Location	Arizona, Texas, Maryland, US

Belligerents
Homeland Security	Coyote smugglers

Casualties and losses
	540 arrested $950K seized 56 vehicles seized

Operation Coyote was a United States Department of Homeland Security 90-day effort to track and seize revenue generated by Mexican cartels in the human smuggling trade along the Mexico–United States border.

== History ==
Operation Coyote followed the May 2014 Operation Southern Crossing that led to the arrest of 163 smugglers in a single month. Operation Coyote launched in June 2014.

By July, 191 smugglers and 450 undocumented aliens were arrested (or 192 smugglers and 501 undocumented aliens), and $600K (or more than $625K) were seized from US banks. 60 special agents were assigned to the case

The Secretary of Homeland Security, Jeh Johnson, commented on the operation in August 2014, announcing that 363 smugglers and their associates had been arrested and more than $800,000 in illicit payments seized. In September 2014, the authorities raided 6 homes in Nacogdoches where 4 persons were arrested, and guns were found along thousands of dollars in cash.

From June to September 2014, U.S. agents seized $950,000 (~$1.24 million in 2024) in 504 accounts at undisclosed banks in Arizona, Texas and Maryland. Homeland Security also reported that in this time period, human smuggling generated $50 million, mainly in the Reynosa area of Tamaulipas. Its impact was also considered minor compared to the actual size of the human trafficking industry between Latin America and the US. The operation was criticized for not taking into account the crisis of child migrants crossing the border.

When starting the operations, Homeland Security assumed that Mexican cartels were the main actors of the cross-border human smuggling, with special agent Oscar Hagelsieb stating to the press "We've been able to trace millions of dollars going into the Reynosa area. You cannot operate a criminal venture of that magnitude without the cartels having a major role in it". No further links to the cartels were uncovered by the US feds.

A 2016 Fox News article implied that Operation Coyote was still ongoing, totaling $2 million (~$2.55 million in 2024) seized and 1,100 arrests.

== See also ==
- Human trafficking in the United States
