= Henry's Turkey Service =

Henry's Turkey Service also known as Hill County Farms was a supplier of workers for poultry processors that hired workers with intellectual disabilities and had them work unreported employment for room and board below minimum wage. This was in violation of the Americans with Disabilities Act. The company is headquartered in Goldthwaite, Texas and the violations occurred in West Liberty, Iowa and Atalissa, Iowa. The case was made into a documentary The Men of Atalissa.
