= California's Forgotten Children =

- Directed by: Melody C. Miller
- Written by: Melody C. Miller
- Produced by: Jerry Heverly
- Starring: Withelma Ortiz Walker Pettigrew
- Cinematography: Jason Knutzen
- Edited by: Eric F. Martin
- Music by: Stephen A. Spies
- Release date: 14 October 2018 (San Diego International Film Festival)
- Running time: 90 minutes
- Country: United States
- Language: English

California's Forgotten Children is an American feature documentary directed by Melody C. Miller. Winning Best Documentary at the 2018 Soho International Film Festival, the film follows a diverse group of resilient survivors who have overcome commercial sexual exploitation of children and are changing the world by ensuring no child is left behind. The film features stories from Time 100 Most Influential People Withelma "T" Ortiz Walker Pettigrew, attorney Carissa Phelps, academic scholar Minh Dang, activist Leah Albright-Byrd, therapist Nikolaos Al-Khadra, and educator Rachel Thomas, M. Ed.

The film supports the stories of survivors with current statistics and perspectives of sexual exploitation from professionals in social services, law enforcement, advocates, and child welfare; such as California Against Slavery, Coalition to Abolish Slavery and Trafficking, Saving Innocence, Motivating, Inspiring, Supporting & Serving Sexually Exploited Youth, National Center for Youth Law, Oakland Police Department, Los Angeles Police Department, Runaway Girl Inc., Nancy O'Malley District Attorney for Alameda County, iEmpathize, Bay Area Women Against Rape, Survivor Alliance, SHADE Movement, Heat Watch, Sowers Education Group, Bridget's Dream, and many more.

The documentary focuses on those who were wrongfully criminalized in the judicial system; manipulated and coerced by family, friends, and caretakers; and exploited by multiple slavery industries.

On June 26, 2019, the film screened at the United States Senate to educate policy makers implementing laws to combat human trafficking. It was honored at the United State of Women Summit in May 2018.

Internationally through film festivals, community screenings, and schools, the documentary continues to educate audiences and mobilize action to help victims of child sex trafficking.

== Awards and honors ==
- Winner for Best Documentary at the Soho International Film Festival, 2018
- Winner of Rising Filmmaker Award at the Riverside International Film Festival, 2018
- Honored at the United State of Women Summit, 2018
- Winner of Best Director at the Chico Independent Film Festival, 2018
- Winner of the Orson Welles Award at the California Film Awards, 2018
- Winner for Best Documentary at the Angeles Documentary, 2018
- Nominated for Best Social Issue Documentary at the San Diego International Film Festival, 2018
- Nominated for Best Feature Documentary at the Los Angeles Women's International Film Festival, 2018
- Nominated for Best Feature Documentary Nepal Human Rights International Film Festival, 2018
- Nominated for Special Jury Award at the Montana International Film Festival, 2019
- Nominated for Best Feature Documentary at the Oakland International Film Festival, 2018
- Nominated for Best Feature Documentary at the Newport Beach International Film Festival, 2018
- Nominated for Best Feature Documentary at the Riverside International Film Festival, 2018
- Nominated for Audience Choice Award at the Riverside International Film Festival, 2018
- Nominated for Best Social Awareness Award at the Chagrin Documentary Film Festival, 2018
- Nominated for Best Feature Documentary at the Long Beach Indie International Film Festival, 2018
- Nominated for Dolores Huerta Award at the Long Beach Indie International Film Festival, 2018
- Nominated for Best Feature Documentary at the Chico Independent Film Festival, 2018
- Nominated for Best Feature Documentary at the Awareness Film Festival, 2018
- Nominated for Best Feature Documentary at the Justice for All Film Festival, 2018
- Nominated for Special Jury Award at the BraveMaker Film Festival, 2019
- Finalist in the Women In Film Mini Upfront's Film Trailer, 2017
