= Human trafficking in California =

Overview of the situation of human trafficking in the U.S. state of California

Human trafficking in California is common relative to other U.S. states, due to California's "proximity to international borders, number of ports and airports, significant immigrant population, and large economy that includes industries that attract forced labor". It serves both as an entry point for slaves imported from outside the US as well as a destination for slaves, with major hubs centered on Los Angeles, Sacramento, San Diego, and San Francisco. According to the 2011 Department of State report, California, together with New York, Texas, and Oklahoma, has the largest concentrations of survivors of human trafficking.

== Legal definitions ==
=== Human trafficking ===
Federally, human trafficking is defined as "the recruitment, harboring, transportation, provision, or obtaining of a person for labor or services through the use of force, fraud, or coercion for the purpose of subjection to involuntary servitude, peonage, debt bondage, or slavery".

The state of California defines a trafficker as "anyone who deprives or violates the personal liberty of another with the intent to obtain forced labor or services, procure or sell the individual for commercial sex, or exploit the individual in an obscene matter". Specifically, depriving and/or violating someone's personal liberty entails "fraud, deceit, coercion, violence, duress, menace, or threat of unlawful injury to the victim or to another person, under circumstances where the person receiving or apprehending the threat reasonably believes that it is likely that the person making the threat would carry it out."

=== Sex trafficking ===
Sex trafficking in California is defined as "causing, inducing, persuading, or attempting to cause, induce or persuade a minor to engage in a commercial sex act" or the "recruitment, harboring, transportation, provision, obtaining, patronizing, or soliciting of a person for the purpose of a commercial sex act."

=== Forced labor ===
The California Department of Justice defines forced labor as "labor or services that are performed or provided by a person and are obtained or maintained through force, fraud, or coercion, or equivalent conduct that would reasonably overbear the will of the person".

== Types of trafficking ==
=== Labor trafficking ===
Labor trafficking involves trafficking persons with the intent to use them for labor-related services.

Domestic service, agricultural work (primarily including migrants), sweatshop labor, and restaurant or hospital work comprise the most common sectors in which labor trafficking arises; domestic service is reported to harbor 27.7% of labor trafficking victims, agriculture with 10.4%, sweatshop work with 4.8%, and restaurant and hotel work with 3.8%.

==== Domestic servitude ====
Domestic servitude involves women, men and even children who are coerced to work for and live in the homes of the employers. The employers exploit their victims by forcing them to work unreasonable hours, paying them less than minimum wages and preventing them from leaving their homes. Domestic workers could be lawfully admitted non-U.S. citizens whose passports are confiscated by their employers as a coercion tactic, U.S. citizens who are forced by their employers or families to provide money, or illegal immigrants who are forced to work un-desirable jobs. Most domestic servitude cases still go unnoticed because of the victims' reluctance to report to the authorities.

=== Sex trafficking ===
Sex trafficking victims in California are primarily women and children, coming from the areas of Thailand, Mexico, and Russia. In some cases, victims are born and raised in the US and coerced into sex trafficking through deceptive means. Prostitution and sex services represented the largest share of documented human trafficking activities in California (roughly 47%). As most trafficking reports only take into account media publicized cases, these percentages may be skewed. It is likely that sex trafficking is over-represented in the media due to high public interest, compared to other types of trafficking.

On the other hand, a federally funded task force conducted a survey and instead looked at a sample of victims reported to the authorities. It found that sex trafficking represented the second largest type of human trafficking at 46%, with labor trafficking representing the largest share at 54%. The discrepancy in results between reported and documented cases could possibly be explained by the fact that sex trafficking is more familiar to authorities, and as a result has a higher chance of being investigated.

In California, much of the prostitution is run behind the guise of a legitimate business, such as a massage parlor. A recent report estimates that over 3,300 massage parlors in California are sex trafficking fronts. Specifically, the report mentioned that Los Angeles, Orange, and Santa Clara counties account for the highest number of sexually oriented massage parlors.

=== Child trafficking ===
Child trafficking is defined as the exploitation of a minor—someone of 18 years or younger—through organized movement that leaves the child vulnerable to recruitment into trafficking cartels, illegal employment, and sexually exploitative work. The FBI has 13 full-time task forces dedicated to investigating high-profile child prostitution enterprises throughout the United States—two are in California, with one in Los Angeles and another in Orange County.

Of the 705 cases of human trafficking in California reported during 2017, 226 involved minors. This is lower than previous years which was 405 in 2016, 300 in 2015, and 296 in 2014. In Los Angeles, the average age of the first encounter with trafficking is 12–14 years and 11–13 years of age for girls and boys respectively, and they have a 7-year life expectancy after this first encounter.

Additionally, homeless youth and foster kids have an increased risk of being subjected to trafficking. For example 58% of sex trafficked girls in Los Angeles County in 2012 were foster kids. Furthermore, it has been found that 40-70% of street youth occasionally engage in prostitution to meet their basic needs.

== Demographics of trafficked persons ==
Most victims of human trafficking in California, whether international or domestic, either come from lower socioeconomic backgrounds or are vulnerable to the temptations of a better life and job. Victims of human trafficking may be are men, women and children born and raised in California or internationally, who are trapped in domestic servitude, forced into prostitution or forced to work on farms far from their initial homes. In schemes involving international persons, the victims are often smuggled into California and are forced into harsh, low-paying jobs, while being indebted to the smugglers for smuggling and transportation, and unreasonably high housing and living costs. The victims of international trafficking avoid reporting the traffickers in fear of exposing their illegal immigration status, language incompetency, oblivion of their own victimization, or wariness about the US judicial system. As immigration laws become more stringent and anti-immigrant antagonism increases, undocumented victims of human trafficking became more prone to coercion into undesirable jobs.

=== Structural causes ===
The main cause of international human trafficking is the promise of a better life and job. Traffickers target individuals without families, jobs or place for shelter. The presence of major airports and intrastate major airports in California allows traffickers to transport the victims with ease, making human trafficking in California a profitable, low-risk and high-reward scheme. Similarly, domestic traffickers look for easy and vulnerable targets, particularly young aged boys and girls in schools, foster homes, and homeless-shelters and streets, by offering them money, protection and drugs. Traffickers psychologically manipulate young people by acting as a parent or a lover, in order to gain their trust and take advantage of their make them emotional vulnerability.

=== National Human Trafficking Hotline statistics ===
The National Human Trafficking Hotline receives calls regarding reporting of human trafficking cases or general questions. In its annual report for 2018, the National Human Trafficking Hotline claims that there were 790 cases of human trafficking in California, which is the highest among all states, with sex trafficking being the leading form of trafficking. Of sex trafficking victims in California, 76.3% were females, 3.9% were males and 26.9% were minors. Additionally, over 14,000 calls were made in 2018 regarding human trafficking and smuggling cases in California.

=== Regions of origin ===
==== Latin America ====
Almost one third of the 50,000 victims yearly trafficked into the United States come from Latin America, and the majority of these victims are trafficked into the US through the Mexico–United States border. The Mexico–United States border has been one of the major hubs for human trafficking due to the presence of gang networks and secret routes through the border.

==== Mexico ====
Mexico's social instability, low average standards of living compared to the United States and proximity to the United States, makes it one of the most active hubs for human and sex trafficking into California. A conservative estimate made in 2000, claims that around 100,000 women are constantly trafficked around Latin American borders for prostitution. More recently, the U.S. Department of State estimated that there were as much as 20,000 young women and children trafficked across the Mexican border each year. It starts with Mexican drug trafficking organizations and gangs supplying local American gangs with the smuggled victims. Two of the prominent Mexican routes for human trafficking share borders with the U.S. at Baja California and Chihuahua. It is estimated that around 800,000 adults and 20,000 children are yearly victims of human trafficking in Mexico.

Mexico is an important destination to human traffickers as it serves as both a destination and origination point for trafficking men, women and children. It has also become a stopover for the transportation of victims to places such as United States, Brazil, Guatemala and El Salvador. The greatest location of human trafficking is the United States–Mexican border as it offers unemployed persons in Mexico a chance to go through to the United States, where they believe they would get a good paying job and start a new life. Mexican cartels are the main players when it comes to both seducing people into human trafficking and transporting/smuggling them into the United States. These Mexican cartels have built approximately 75 cross-border trafficking and smuggling tunnels, some of which that go into California. These tunnels have made it very easy to transport people from Mexico to California, especially because these tunnels appear to be highly technological as they are equipped with electric rails cars, lights, hydraulic doors and elevators. The well-established connection between gangs in Mexico and the United States guarantees that the victims trafficked into the United States are readily being taken by the U.S. based gangs into all sorts of jobs.

Some of the human trafficking from Mexico into California tends to happen through the so-called "San Diego trafficking corridor". Women and young girls are transported from the Mexico–California border to the northern San Diego County, where they are controlled by pimps who work alongside the traffickers. These women and young girls are placed in brothels, massage parlors and strip-clubs. Research shows that the criminal networks in San Diego control more than 50 brothels, each of which employs hundreds of Mexican girls and women over the course of the year. The trafficked underage girls are also sold to U.S. military camps, U.S. tourists and farmers, who all abuse and rape the girls as young as 9 years old . These underage girls often end up with kids of their own as their "owners"/rapists sometimes do not use sexual protection, in order to label the girls as their own property. This raises bigger health concerns as these exploited girls are at high risks of having STDs such as HIV/AIDS without being aware of the calamity of the disease.

==== Role of coyotes ====
"Coyote" is the colloquial Mexican–Spanish used to describe the practice of trafficking people across the U.S.–Mexico border. While in the past coyotes would only smuggle persons in to the United States, recently coyotes have been forcing these smuggled persons into labor agreements upon reaching the United States. These labor agreements exploit the smuggled persons as it involves working in severe conditions for long hours in agricultural labor, forced prostitution and domestic servitude. With recent efforts by authorities to reduce smuggling across the borders, smuggling costs have increased, making smuggled people indebted to coyotes and thus more susceptible to being victims of human trafficking.

=== Additional victim statistics ===
Since the nature of human trafficking is so complex and widespread, complete and accurate statistics concerning the country of origin of victims of trafficking can be difficult to obtain or conflicting.

- One report states that from 1993 to 2003, 500 individuals had been trafficked from 18 different countries into California. 136 survivors came from Thailand, 104 from Mexico, 53 from Russia, and 5.4% of the victims were from America.
- Another report states that 72% of trafficking victims in California are American.

Statistics also vary by region:

- A report made in 2015 states that 72% of the 225 trafficking victims in Orange County, California, were born in the US.
- In San Francisco, of the 499 reported trafficking victims, 117 were from San Francisco, 47 were from other parts of the US, 8 were from Mexico, and 6 were from the Philippines. (Country of origin information was missing for 198 of these victims.)
- In a report detailing information reported by the National Human Trafficking Hotline, 36% of cases concerned US citizens, 21% of cases concerned foreign citizens, and 42% of cases did not contain demographic information for the victim.

== Profiles ==
=== Historical changes ===
Over the last 10 years, the profiles of both victims and offenders has changed. Women still represent the majority of trafficked victims, but the share of men and children has increased in recent years, in addition to those trafficked for forced labor. Further, domestic trafficking within a country's borders has also significantly increased.

The UNODC points that victims and traffickers often share various backgrounds in terms of: language and ethnicity, citizenship, gender, and in some cases, family ties. These elements make it easier for traffickers to gain the trust of the victim, recruit them, and exploit them.

=== Victim profiles ===
There is no single profile for victims, as they come from diverse backgrounds in terms of "race, color, national origin, disability, religion, age, gender, sexual orientation, gender identity, socioeconomic status, education level, and citizenship status". However, they all have some form of vulnerability which the trafficker leverages. These include, but are not limited to: poverty, social isolation, separation from country of origin, drug addiction, runaway or homeless youth, sexual/physical abuse, incest, and refugee status.

=== Offender profiles ===
A recent study conducted through interviews with traffickers found that most federally convicted offenders either operated alone (57%) or with 1-3 members through social/family ties, with no known organizational support. It was also found that female offenders often served as both victims and offenders, typically in that order. Nearly all those interviewed mentioned that their primary driver was to earn money, and that few options were available to earn a comparable sum. The other leading motivation included pressure by family members.

== Law ==
=== 2005-2015 ===
- Passed in 2005, Assembly Bill 22, California's first law setting higher criminal penalties for human trafficking, allowed victims to receive financial restitution as it relates to their trafficking experiences and for bringing civil action lawsuits against their traffickers.
- Passed in 2011, California enacted the "Transparency in Supply Chains Act", which required large retailers and manufacturers from 1 January 2012 to disclose their efforts to eradicate slavery and human trafficking from their supply chains.
- Passed in 2012, Senate Bill 1193 required certain businesses to post a human trafficking hotline in a public location.
- California criminal code specifies that the Attorney General should give priority to human trafficking matters. Law enforcement agencies are required to use due diligence in identifying victims. Additional fines are levied against people convicted of trafficking, which is to be used for child sexual abuse prevention and counseling and to serve minor victims of human trafficking.
- In June 2015, California introduced Senate Bill 84, a measure that established the Human Trafficking Victims Assistance and mandated that the fund's money go towards grants to qualified nonprofits, reimbursing them for any costs incurred when assisting victims of human trafficking. The budget behind this fund is a one-time allowance of $10 million.
- Passed in October 2015, Assembly Bill 15 states that for any human trafficking offense, the perpetrator(s) must undergo a civil action lawsuit within seven years of the date that the victim was freed.

=== September 2016 ===
The following provisions were passed in September 2016:

- Assembly Bill 2498 allows for human trafficking victims' names, images, and family information to be withheld by local or state police agencies until the related investigation and prosecution is complete.
- Assembly Bill 1276 authorizes minors of 15 years or younger to testify in human trafficking cases.
- Previous existing law deemed soliciting or engaging in prostitution, along with loitering in any public area with the objective of engaging in prostitution, a crime. Senate Bill 1322 makes this provision inapplicable to minors under 18 years old who solicited or engaged in prostituting behavior, whom law enforcement would only be able to take into temporary custody under limited circumstances if they were found committing the aforementioned acts.
- Senate Bill 1064 indefinitely extended the life of a pilot program intended to provide "comprehensive, replicative, multidisciplinary model to address the needs and effective treatment of commercially sexually exploited minors". It also expanded the existing legal definition of "commercially sexually exploited minor" to account for minors who have been arrested for engaging in prostitution due to the fact that they have been proven to be commercially exploited.

=== October 2017 ===
- Assembly Bill 260 would additionally require hotels, motels, and bed and breakfast inns, as defined, not including personal residences, to post the notice relating to slavery and human trafficking, as specified.

=== September 2018 ===
- School districts are currently required to ensure that all students in grades 7 to 12 receive information about human trafficking as part of their sexual health and HIV prevention education. Assembly Bill 1861 requires that the information about human trafficking include information on how social media and mobile device applications are used for human trafficking.
- Senate Bill 970 would authorize the Department of Fair Employment and Housing to require specified employers to provide at least 20 minutes of prescribed training and education regarding human trafficking awareness to employees who are likely to interact or come into contact with victims of human trafficking, as defined.

=== October 2019 ===
- Assembly Bill 629 would authorize the California Victim Compensation Board to provide compensation equal to loss of income or support that a victim incurs as a direct result of the victim’s deprivation of liberty during the crime, if the qualifying crime is human trafficking, in an amount not exceeding the value of the victim’s labor as guaranteed under California law for up to 40 hours per week, as specified.
- Senate Bill 233 would prohibit the arrest of a person for a misdemeanor violation of the CUCSA or specified sex work crimes, if that person is reporting that they are a victim of, or a witness to, specified crimes. The bill would also state that possession of condoms in any amount does not provide a basis for probable cause for arrest for specified sex work crimes.

== Undocumented immigrants ==
The Public Policy Institute of California estimates that the size of the undocumented immigrant population in California was approximately 2.6 million in 2010, while it estimates that the size of the undocumented immigrant population in the United States was approximately 10.8 million. California is the state with the most illegal immigrant population, followed by Texas. Estimates show that unauthorized immigrants make 7% of the total California population and 9% of California's labor force. undocumented immigrants could either be victims of international human trafficking or easy targets for traffickers because of their illegal status.

According to research at San Diego State University, approximately 30.9% (or 38,458) of undocumented Mexican workers in San Diego county have been victims of human trafficking. They found that around 6% of undocumented immigrants were trafficked by their smugglers while entering the United States. 28% were trafficked by their employers after entering the United States. They found that 36% of undocumented Mexicans working in cleaning businesses were victims of human trafficking, 35% of those working in construction, 27% of those working in landscaping, and 16% of those working in agriculture. In an effort to curb the spread of trafficking, California Attorney General Kamala Harris and Mexico Attorney General Marisela Morales Ibáñez signed an accord in 2012 to expand prosecutions of criminals typically members of transnational gangs who engage in the trafficking of human beings between the United States and Mexico.

== Criminal consequences of trafficking ==
American federal law prohibits human trafficking through several provisions. Federal law outlaws sex trafficking and labor trafficking in particular as they are defined federally. Federal agencies may enforce these laws either independently or in conjunction with local law enforcement bodies.

California state law defines human trafficking as follows:

...State law defines human trafficking as violating the liberty of a person with the intent to either (1) commit certain felony crimes (such as prostitution) or (2) obtain forced labor or services.

An adult person found to be involved in human trafficking as defined by the state of California would be punished under state law through a prison sentence of up to five years. If a person under the age of 18 engaged in what the state defines as human trafficking, their actions would be punishable with a prison sentence of up to eight years. Criminal punishments for people found to be engaging in human trafficking are always felonies under California law.

People convicted of obtaining forced labor through human trafficking faces either five, eight, or twelve years in prison, plus a fine of up to $500,000. If found to be committing human trafficking crimes connected to commercial sex trafficking, sexual extortion, or child pornography, they faces either eight, fourteen, or twenty years in state prison, a fine of up to $500,000, and the legally mandated responsibility to register as a sex offender.

People coercing a minor under the age of 18 to engage in commercial sex acts can receive five to twelve years in prison or a prison sentence of fifteen years to life if the relevant jury determines that they used "force, fear, violence, or threat of injury to the alleged victim"; a $500,000 fine; and the requirement to register as a sex offender.

== Examples ==
- In 1995, about 70 Thai garment workers were found and released from a labor trafficking ring in El Monte City in Los Angeles County in the El Monte Thai Garment Slavery Case. The workers had been lured to the United States and then forced against their will to continually work in a garment factory for $1.60 an hour. Additionally, the prisoners were not allowed outside and were told their families would be harmed and their homes burned if they tried to escape. This case eventually resulted in the creation of laws that allowed for survivors of human trafficking to gain visas.
- Lakireddy Bali Reddy was one of Berkeley's richest real estate tycoons and restaurateurs, who operated a sex trafficking ring in Berkeley, California. His victims were continually raped and forced to work in his restaurants and rental properties. He was discovered when one of his slaves died of carbon monoxide poisoning. He was convicted and served a little less than an eight-year sentence in Lompoc Federal Prison. His sentence prompted a public conversation which led to reform of California law regarding human trafficking.
- JB Farm Labor contractor hired hundreds to work on an asparagus farm in San Joaquin County. Once hired, they were held hostage and threatened with physical harm if they complained to authorities. After California Rural Legal Assistance was unable to locate JB Farm Labor contractor, they sued the grower, who eventually paid-back the workers.
- The Trans Bay Steel, Inc. contracted with Kota Manpower Co., and Hi Cap Enterprises, Inc., to hire 48 weld workers to work on the San Francisco Bay Bridge. However, only 9 went to work with Trans Bay Steel. The others were held against their will, had their passports confiscated, had their movements restricted, and were forced to work without pay at Thai restaurants owned by Kota Manpower and Hi-Cap in Los Angeles and Long Beach. In December 2016, Trans Bay Steel was sued by the US Equal Employment Opportunity Commission and forced to pay an estimated $1 million in relief and compensation.

== Prominent locations ==
Los Angeles, San Diego, and San Francisco are included in the FBI's list of top thirteen child sex trafficking areas in the nation. These areas' close proximity to the international border, diverse population, and presence of seaports and airports makes them vulnerable to human trafficking.

=== Los Angeles ===
Los Angeles is one of the three major entry points for human trafficking in the US. Los Angeles is a hotspot for human trafficking because of its diverse population, international connections, and involvement in the fashion industry. Between 2007 and 2016, there were 2,803 total calls (the third most calls per city) made to the National Human Trafficking Hotline from the Los Angeles area, with 884 of these cases having high or moderate characteristics of human trafficking (the second largest number of cases per city).

In Los Angeles, a sex trafficker makes, on average, $49,000 per victim. The average onset age for girls and boys subjected to child trafficking in Los Angeles is 12-14 and 11–13 years of age respectively. Survivors have an average lifespan of 7 years after their first encounter with trafficking, where HIV/AIDS or homicide are the largest causes of death.

Los Angeles has been focusing on public awareness campaigns in hopes that more people will notice possible indicators of human trafficking. Additionally, the Los Angeles Regional Human Trafficking Task Force was launched in 2015. A significant focus of this regional task force is to work with the LASD Human Trafficking Unit to treat child survivors as victims and not criminals.

In 2018, Los Angeles headed the three day "Operation Reclaim and Rebuild" to create a large scale attack on human trafficking. 80 federal, state, and local law enforcement agencies and task forces participated in the operation. 510 arrests were made with 30 suspected traffickers and more than 50 human trafficking survivors saved (45 adults, 11 children) statewide.

=== San Diego ===
Human trafficking is prominent in San Diego's fishing and agricultural industries. Between 2007 and 2016, the National Human Trafficking Hotline received 1,333 calls from San Diego (10th most calls among cities), with 335 of these cases having high or moderate indicators associated with human trafficking (11th most).

The San Diego District Attorney's Office concluded that there are at least 8,000 human trafficking survivors currently in San Diego and that human trafficking is the second largest underground economy in San Diego after drug trafficking, creating an $810 million profit. Other reports claim that there are between 3,417 and 8,108 sex trafficking survivors in San Diego. Additionally, 31% of Spanish Speaking immigrants living in San Diego have been subjected to human trafficking.

One report claimed that out of 20 high schools in San Diego interviewed, all had had sex trafficking recruitment taken place on their campus, while 90% had sex-trafficking cases. Additionally, around 110 gangs were found to be involved in human trafficking in San Diego. Furthermore, a presence of international criminal networks used to traffic children and adults across the border was noted.

San Diego has created the Ugly Truth Campaign and Out of the Shadows in order to raise public awareness of human trafficking in San Diego.

=== San Francisco ===
Between 2007 and 2016, the National Human Trafficking Hotline reported 1,102 calls and 302 cases concerning human trafficking from San Francisco area.

In 2013, the Mayor's Task Force on Anti-Human Trafficking was created to eliminate gaps in services to survivors of human trafficking and create a victim-centered approach to treating survivors. This task force consisted of a Child Sex Trafficking Committee, a Labor Trafficking Committee, and a Sex Work and Trafficking Policy Impact Committee.

From July 2014 to December 2014, 291 human trafficking survivors were identified in San Francisco, with 224 being female and 118 of them being children. In 2015, 499 survivors of human trafficking were identified in San Francisco, with 122 being minors, 283 being adults, and 94 being unknown; 54% of these cases involved sex trafficking. In 2015, the National Human Trafficking Hotline noted that 80% of the calls from San Francisco concerning human trafficking involved women.

== Regional task forces ==
California does not have a single task force to combat human trafficking, but instead has nine regional task forces. The U.S. Department of Justice awarded grants to create six regional task forces in 2004 and 2005, and in 2009 and 2010, the California Emergency Management Agency used American Recovery and Reinvestment Act grant funds to create three new regional task forces. Task forces and made up of law enforcement and local, state, and federal prosecutors, as well as other governmental leaders and nongovernmental organizations. The task forces are as follows:

- Tulare County Human Trafficking Task Force
- East Bay Human Trafficking Task Force
- Fresno Coalition Against Human Trafficking
- Los Angeles Metro Area Task Force on Human Trafficking
- North Bay Human Trafficking Task Force
- Orange County Human Trafficking Task Force
- Riverside County Anti-Human Trafficking Task Force
- Sacramento Innocence Lost Task Force
- San Diego North County Anti-Trafficking Task Force
- San Jose/South Bay Human Trafficking Task Force

== Organizations ==
- Coalition to Abolish Slavery and Trafficking (CAST) is a Los Angeles-based organization that provides legal, social, advocacy, and rehabilitation services to survivors of human trafficking, raises awareness, and affects legislation and public policy surrounding human trafficking.
- California Against Slavery is an organization that focused on passing the Californians Against Sexual Exploitation (CASE) Act.
- ESPLER Project (Erotic Service Providers Legal Education & Research Project) is an organization that works to support sex work rights and advocate for victims of government trafficking, exploitation, and criminalization.
- Slavery Footprint is an Oakland-based organization that seeks to raise the awareness of slavery. They investigated the supply lines of 400 consumer products and created an online survey that allows takers to determine the number of slaves that are needed to maintain their personal lifestyle.
- Not for Sale is an international non-profit organization based out of San Francisco, California that works to protect people and communities around the world from human trafficking and modern-day slavery.
- The Thai Community Development Center is a Los Angeles based organization that works to bring redress and restitution to Thai victims of human trafficking.

== Documentaries ==
- California's Forgotten Children is a feature documentary that follows a diverse group of survivors of child sex trafficking who were commercially sexually exploited and are now advocates fighting for the rights of victims worldwide.
