= California Against Slavery =

U.S. nonprofit organization

California Against Slavery (CAS) is a 501(c)(3) organization that launched a California state wide directory of organizations and agencies that provide services to victims and survivors of human trafficking, sex trafficking, and labor trafficking. The organization focuses on the specific goal of creating a Connected and Collaborating California. The directory is meant to aid survivors, service providers and concerned citizens in joining the fight against human trafficking. The CAS website contains a page with Resources that directs the user to Awareness Materials, Trainings, Legislation, Prevention Education, Research, and Legislative Models.

== History ==
California Against Slavery (CAS) was founded in 2010 (16 years ago) as a 501(c)(4) human rights advocacy organization directed at strengthening California state laws to protect victims of sex trafficking, particularly minors, and to increase law enforcement efforts. The organization focused on the specific goal to put an initiative on the 2012 California ballot. California voters passed Proposition 35 (the CASE Act), a California Against Slavery citizen initiative with over 81% approval, making it the most popular initiative since Californians began the process in 1914.

== Ballot initiatives ==
CAS seeks to initiate a vote on a ballot question that would (1) make stiffer criminal penalties (2) aid district attorneys in prosecuting human trafficking offenses, (3) increase protection for human trafficking victims, (4) mandate two-hour human trafficking training for law enforcement officers, and (5) increase allocation of certain seized assets and fines to organizations that serve human trafficking victims. CAS was unable to reach the required 600,000 signatures required before the March 31, 2010 deadline for automatic placement on the ballot. The organization is actively seeking to raise awareness and to get an initiative on the ballot in 2012.

== Raising awareness ==
Daphne Phung, who is part of CAS, was interviewed on KRON about human trafficking and the organization's efforts.

== The Organization’s Role in Creating a Database of Anti-Human Trafficking Services ==
One of California Against Slavery’s key activities is to create and maintain a nationwide database of organizations and centers that provide services to victims of human trafficking. In addition to introducing services related to housing, counseling, legal protection, treatment, education, and rehabilitation, this system also allows member organizations to register and update information. The goal of this system is to increase access to services available throughout California for survivors and professionals and to reduce the fragmentation of information.

== Public Participation in Completing the Service Network ==
The California Against Slavery website allows for the registration of new organizations and updates of existing centers. This approach ensures that the list of services is continually updated and refined by active organizations, and that the information provided reflects the capacities available in different areas of California. This participatory model helps to keep the service network comprehensive and up-to-date.

== See also ==
- Human trafficking in California
