= BraveMaker Film Festival =

The BraveMaker Film Festival is an annual film festival founded by Tony Gapastione in 2018, with its first run in 2019. Gapastione has continued to run the festival since its inception.

The festival is held in Redwood City, California and has a consistent focus on justice, diversity, and inclusion. The festival features a wide range of films, including documentaries, narratives, and shorts, and also offers panels, workshops, and networking events with industry professionals. Each screening is followed by an in-person panel discussion. All films shown during the festival have open captions.

Bravemaker is a 501(c)(3) organization and has served to receive donations to assist filmmakers.

The exact dates of the festival have varied over the years, ranging from late May to mid-July. The 2027 festival is set to run from 7-11 July.

== Notable films shown and appearances ==
- 2019, California's Forgotten Children
- 2024, Friendly Signs with an appearance by Rahsaan Thomas
- 2025, Marlee Matlin: Not Alone Anymore with appearances by Marlee Matlin and the film's director Shoshannah Stern
- 2025, The Peanut Butter Falcon with an appearance by Zack Gottsagen
- 2025, Ken Whittingham hosted a directorial workshop
