= Jessa Dillow Crisp =

Jessa Dillow Crisp (born 1988) is a survivor of and an advocate against human trafficking for the sex industry.

== Childhood ==
Jessa Dillow Crisp was sexually abused by family members since the age of 10. They then forced her to be a model for child pornographers. After that her family trafficked her to pimps and pedophiles in the surrounding neighborhoods. Crisp says that the abuse also took place in local brothels and hotels. She claims that she was trafficked domestically in Canada but also across the border in the USA. She described the impact it had on her in the following way: I was scared to reach out for help and growing up the message that was branded on my heart was the idea that I had no worth, I was shameful, and all I was good for was sex. Crisp also stated that police officers were among her abusers and that she was threatened with being put in jail if she ever spoke out about what was happening to her.

== Escape from trafficking ==
Crisp planned her escape for months. In 2010, she finally managed to escape with the help of a woman who ran a safe house in the US. Having entered the United States on a tourist Visa, Crisp was forced to leave again after 6 months. She subsequently entered a safe house in Vancouver. It was there that she befriended a disguised female pimp. This pimp proceeded to traffic her out during the 2010 Vancouver Winter Olympics. Crisp managed to escape once again to the same safe house she entered the first time when in the US. The head of the safe house suggested that Crisp should enroll in college. She was first hesitant and believed that it wouldn't be possible for her to be accepted or go through college as she hadn't been able to attend school at all in her childhood. She was then told by the head of the safe house, "If you can read you can learn anything." Crisp diligently started to study hard in order to apply for college. She managed to get accepted into Nazarene Bible College and was thus able to obtain a student visa, which made it possible for her to stay in the US.

== Education ==
Crisp graduated summa cum laude with a 4.0 GPA BA in Clinical Counseling in 2016. She was the valedictorian of her class. She is continuing her education in an MA program for Clinical Mental Health Counseling and is planning on obtaining a PhD in Clinical Psychology with a specialisation in trauma recovery. She is expected to graduate with a MA in May 2020.

== Activism ==
Crisp is the Co-Founder and Executive Director of Bridge Hope Now since 2011. The organisation provides trainings for organisations on what human trafficking is, how to spot it and how to combat it. Bridge Hope Now is also developing a smart phone app to coordinate resources for survivors or networks that victims can use to exit the sex industry. The organisation also helps survivors thrive in their lives after human trafficking through a mentorship program and a holiday program (including Christmas gifts and programs for survivors). Crisp is a public speaker on the topic of human trafficking. She has given a talk for the US Air Force Academy National Character and Leadership Symposium in 2018. Crisp has aside from that spoken at several conferences on human trafficking and worked with anti- human trafficking organisations both in the US and Europe.

== Personal life ==
Crisp married John Crisp in 2015. Her husband is a photographer and PhD student. They both live in Denver, Colorado.
