= Atalissa, Iowa =

- City
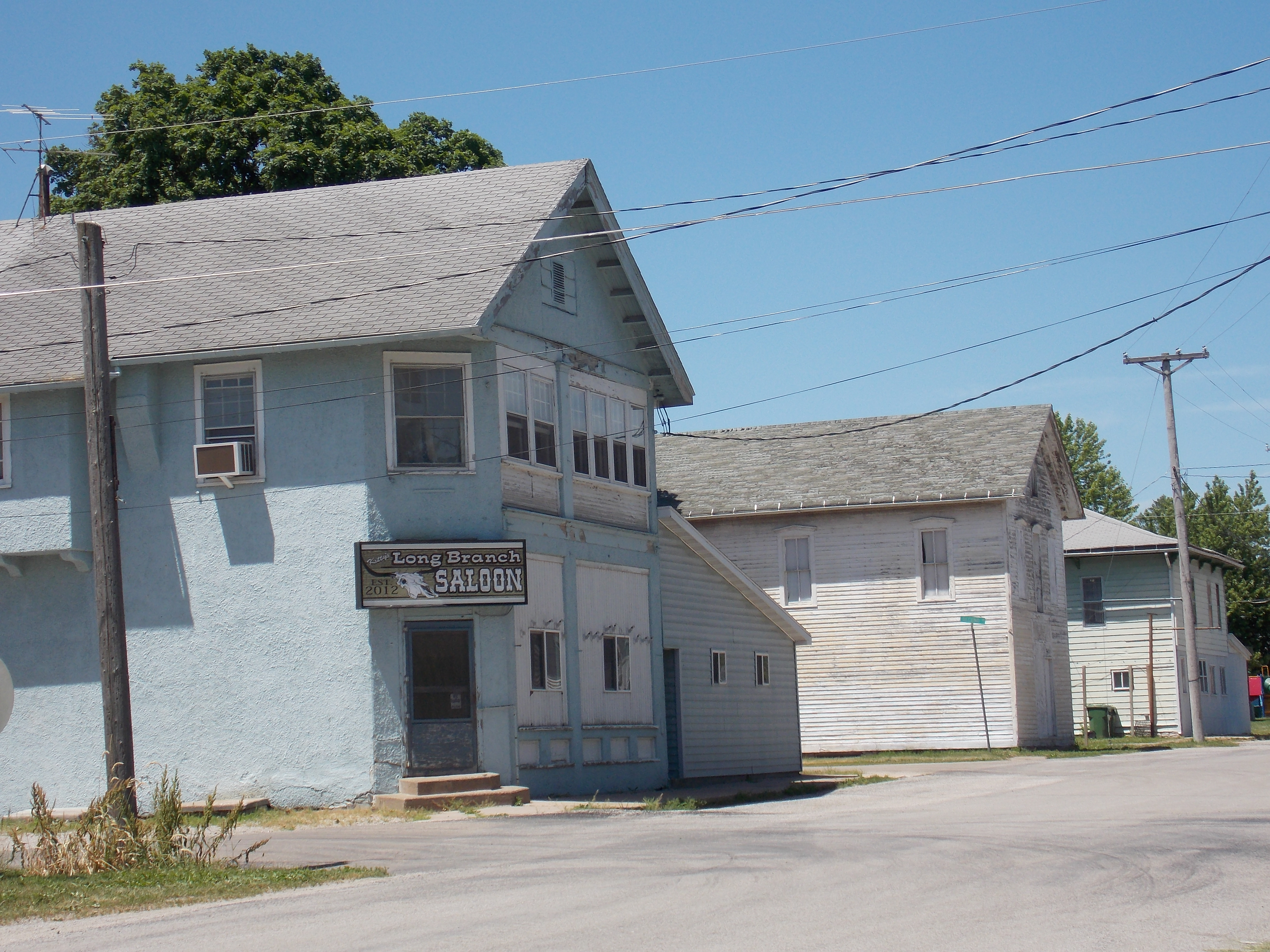
- Buildings in the small commercial district of Atalissa, Iowa.

- Location of Atalissa, Iowa
- Coordinates: 41°34′18″N 91°09′59″W
- Country: United States
- State: Iowa
- County: Muscatine

Area
  - Total: 0.14 sq mi (0.36 km^{2})
  - Land: 0.14 sq mi (0.36 km^{2})
  - Water: 0 sq mi (0.00 km^{2})
- Elevation: 663 ft (202 m)

Population (2020)
  - Total: 296
  - Density: 2,127.1/sq mi (821.29/km^{2})
- Time zone: UTC-6 (Central (CST))
  - Summer (DST): UTC-5 (CDT)
- ZIP code: 52720
- Area code: 563
- FIPS code: 19-03385
- GNIS feature ID: 2394008

Atalissa is a city in Muscatine County, Iowa, United States. The population was 296 at the 2020 census. It is part of the Muscatine Micropolitan Statistical Area.

== History ==
Atalissa was platted in 1859. It was named by its founder, William Lundy, for a mining town in California, which in turn was named for an Indian queen Atalissa.

From 1974 to 2009 Atalissa was the home of a few dozen intellectually challenged men who worked in a nearby turkey processing plant. They lived together in an old schoolhouse and were taken each workday to the plant, and after expenses were taken out, were paid no more than $65/month. They were removed and relocated by state agencies in 2009, after being found to be living in unacceptable conditions. A 2013 verdict awarded the men a total of $240 million in damages, since reduced to $50,000/man. The men's plight had a profound effect on social services in Iowa, and their experiences and subsequent court case was the subject of the documentary film The Men of Atalissa.

== Geography ==
According to the United States Census Bureau, the city has a total area of 0.14 square miles (0.36 km^{2}), all land.

== Demographics ==
Historical populations
Year	Pop.	±%
1910	220	—
1920	198	−10.0%
1930	187	−5.6%
1940	181	−3.2%
1950	204	+12.7%
1960	212	+3.9%
1970	244	+15.1%
1980	360	+47.5%
1990	357	−0.8%
2000	283	−20.7%
2010	311	+9.9%
2020	296	−4.8%
Source:"U.S. Census website". United States Census Bureau. and Iowa Data Center; Source: U.S. Decennial Census

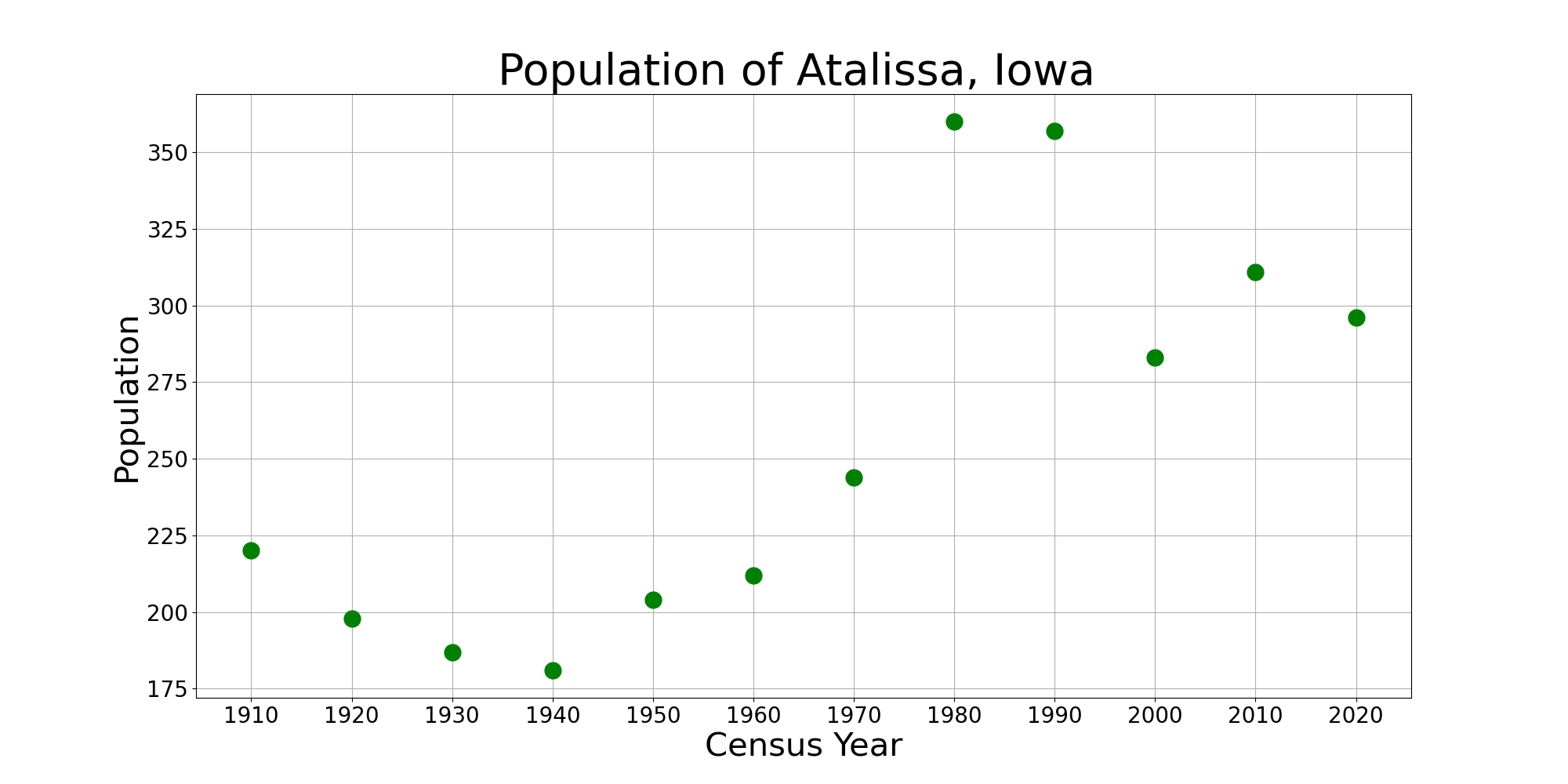
The population of Atalissa, Iowa from US census data

=== 2020 census ===
As of the census of 2020, there were 296 people, 115 households, and 81 families residing in the city. The population density was 2,178.2 inhabitants per square mile (841.0/km^{2}). There were 117 housing units at an average density of 861.0 per square mile (332.4/km^{2}). The racial makeup of the city was 92.2% White, 0.3% Black or African American, 0.0% Native American, 0.0% Asian, 0.0% Pacific Islander, 0.7% from other races and 6.8% from two or more races. Hispanic or Latino persons of any race comprised 7.4% of the population.

Of the 115 households, 37.4% of which had children under the age of 18 living with them, 52.2% were married couples living together, 13.0% were cohabitating couples, 17.4% had a female householder with no spouse or partner present and 17.4% had a male householder with no spouse or partner present. 29.6% of all households were non-families. 22.6% of all households were made up of individuals, 13.0% had someone living alone who was 65 years old or older.

The median age in the city was 35.2 years. 30.1% of the residents were under the age of 20; 4.7% were between the ages of 20 and 24; 25.0% were from 25 and 44; 26.4% were from 45 and 64; and 13.9% were 65 years of age or older. The gender makeup of the city was 51.4% male and 48.6% female.

=== 2010 census ===
As of the census of 2010, there were 311 people, 111 households, and 85 families living in the city. The population density was 2,221.4 inhabitants per square mile (857.7/km^{2}). There were 122 housing units at an average density of 871.4 per square mile (336.4/km^{2}). The racial makeup of the city was 94.2% White, 0.3% Asian, 2.3% from other races, and 3.2% from two or more races. Hispanic or Latino of any race were 7.4% of the population.

There were 111 households, of which 39.6% had children under the age of 18 living with them, 55.0% were married couples living together, 13.5% had a female householder with no husband present, 8.1% had a male householder with no wife present, and 23.4% were non-families. 17.1% of all households were made up of individuals, and 6.3% had someone living alone who was 65 years of age or older. The average household size was 2.80 and the average family size was 3.05.

The median age in the city was 34.4 years. 27.7% of residents were under the age of 18; 9.6% were between the ages of 18 and 24; 26.4% were from 25 to 44; 26% were from 45 to 64; and 10.3% were 65 years of age or older. The gender makeup of the city was 46.3% male and 53.7% female.

=== 2000 census ===
As of the census of 2000, there were 283 people, 113 households, and 80 families living in the city. The population density was 2,119.8 inhabitants per square mile (818.5/km^{2}). There were 120 housing units at an average density of 898.8 per square mile (347.0/km^{2}). The racial makeup of the city was 98.94% White, and 1.06% from two or more races. Hispanic or Latino of any race were 1.41% of the population.

There were 113 households, out of which 30.1% had children under the age of 18 living with them, 58.4% were married couples living together, 7.1% had a female householder with no husband present, and 29.2% were non-families. 26.5% of all households were made up of individuals, and 13.3% had someone living alone who was 65 years of age or older. The average household size was 2.50 and the average family size was 3.01.

In the city, the population was spread out, with 26.9% under the age of 18, 9.9% from 18 to 24, 30.0% from 25 to 44, 23.0% from 45 to 64, and 10.2% who were 65 years of age or older. The median age was 34 years. For every 100 females, there were 91.2 males. For every 100 females age 18 and over, there were 99.0 males.

The median income for a household in the city was $31,875, and the median income for a family was $43,929. Males had a median income of $31,250 versus $24,583 for females. The per capita income for the city was $20,269. About 6.0% of families and 9.4% of the population were below the poverty line, including 11.9% of those under the age of eighteen and 11.1% of those 65 or over.

== Education ==
The West Liberty Community School District operates local public schools.
