= The Men of Atalissa =

The Men of Atalissa is a 2014 documentary film by POV.org and The New York Times about 32 intellectually-disabled people who were employed by Texas-based Henry’s Turkey Service without proper compensation. They were abused physically and mentally, living in harsh conditions in Atalissa, Iowa for more than 30 years, beginning in the 1970s. The men processed meat for a wage of $65 a month and shelter in an old uphill schoolhouse. Their conditions were made public in 2009, leading to a $240 million jury verdict, subsequently reduced to $50,000 per person. The documentary is based on court records and internal documents of the company and features first-time interviews with seven of the victims.
