= List of abolitionists =

This is a listing of notable opponents of slavery, often called abolitionists.

== Groups ==
=== Historical ===
- African Methodist Episcopal Church (American)
- American Anti-Slavery Society (American)
- American Missionary Association (American)
- Anti-Slavery Society (British)
- Birmingham Ladies Society for the Relief of Negro Slaves, founded 1825 (British)
- Boston Female Anti-Slavery Society (American)
- Boston Vigilance Committee (American)
- British and Foreign Anti-Slavery Society, founded 1839, continues as Anti-Slavery International
- Clapham Sect (British)
- Committee for the Abolition of the Slave Trade (British)
- Dames-Comité ter Bevordering van de Evangelieverkondiging en de Afschaffing der Slavernij, founded 1856 (Dutch)
- Free Soil Party (American)
- Free-Staters (Kansas) (American)
- Jayhawkers (American)
- International Justice Mission (American)
- Liberty Party (United States, 1840)
- Massachusetts Anti-Slavery Society (American)
- Massachusetts General Colored Association (American)
- Nederlandsche Maatschappij ter Bevordering van de Afschaffing der Slavernij, founded 1842 (Dutch)
- New York Manumission Society (American)
- New England Anti-Slavery Society (American)
- New England Freedom Association (American)
- Oneida Institute (American)
- Pennsylvania Anti-Slavery Society (American)
- Religious Society of Friends (Quakers)
- Sociedad Abolicionista Española, founded 1864 (Spanish)
- Society for Effecting the Abolition of the Slave Trade, 1787–1807? (British, aka Abolition Society)
- Society for the Mitigation and Gradual Abolition of Slavery Throughout the British Dominions, 1823–1838 (British, aka Anti-Slavery Society)
- Society for the Relief of Free Negroes Unlawfully Held in Bondage (American)
- Society of the Friends of the Blacks (Société des Amis des Noirs) (French)
- Testonites (British)

=== Contemporary ===
- 8th Day Center for Justice, a Roman Catholic non-profit organization based in Chicago, Illinois
- A Better World, organization that is based in Lacombe, Alberta, Canada
- A21 Campaign, 501(c)(3) non-profit, non-governmental organization that works to fight human trafficking
- ABC Nepal, non-profit non- governmental organisation working in Nepal on trafficking of girls and minors across Indian subcontinent and Arabian countries, founded by Durga Ghimire.
- Agape International Missions, nonprofit organization in Cambodia
- Anti-Slavery International, works at local, national and international levels to eliminate all forms of slavery around the world
- Arizona League to End Regional Trafficking, coalition representing partnerships with law enforcement, faith-based communities, non-profit organizations, social service agencies, attorneys and concerned citizens.
- Awareness Against Human Trafficking (HAART), non-governmental organization fighting against human trafficking in Kenya.
- California Against Slavery, human rights organization directed at strengthening California state laws to protect victims of sex trafficking
- Chab Dai, coalition founded by Helen Sworn that connects Christian organizations committed to ending sexual abuse and trafficking.
- Children's Organization of Southeast Asia (COSA), International Organization which works towards the prevention of child human trafficking and sexual exploitation within the Northern regions of Thailand, especially among hill-tribe communities.
- Coalition Against Trafficking in Women, international non-governmental organization opposing human trafficking, prostitution, and other forms of commercial sex
- Coalition to Abolish Slavery and Trafficking, Los Angeles-based anti-human trafficking organization
- ECPAT, international non-governmental organisation and network headquartered in Thailand which is designed to end the commercial sexual exploitation of children
- Face to Face Bulgaria, organization whose primary mission is to prevent cases of forced prostitution and human trafficking in Bulgaria
- Free the Slaves, dedicated to ending Slavery Worldwide
- Freeset, organization whose primary mission is to provide sustainable employment and economic empowerment to victims of sex trafficking in South Asia.
- Global Alliance Against Traffic in Women, network of more than 100 non-governmental organisations from all regions of the world, who share a deep concern for the women, children and men whose human rights have been violated by the criminal practice of trafficking in persons
- Global Centurion, is non-profit organization that fights trafficking by focusing on demand
- Hope for Justice, identifies and rescues victims, advocates on their behalf, provides restorative care which rebuilds lives and trains frontline professionals to tackle slavery.
- Ing Makababaying Aksyon (Filipino)
- International Justice Mission, an anti-trafficking organization.
- La Strada International Association, international NGO network addressing trafficking in human beings in Europe
- Love 146, vision: abolition of child trafficking and slavery, nothing less.
- Maiti Nepal, non-profit organization in Nepal dedicated to helping victims of sex trafficking
- NASHI, a Saskatoon, Saskatchewan, Canada-based organisation that opposes human trafficking by raising awareness through education
- Office to Combat Trafficking in Persons, government agency responsible for coordinating efforts to address human trafficking in British Columbia, Canada
- Polaris Project, nonprofit, non-governmental organization that works to combat and prevent modern day slavery and human trafficking
- Prerana, non-governmental organization (NGO) that works in the red-light districts of Mumbai, India, to protect children vulnerable to commercial sexual exploitation and trafficking. The organization runs three night care centers for children at risk, as well as shelter homes and a residential training center for girls rescued from the trafficking trade.
- Ratanak International, organisation that rescues children from sexual slavery and then provides them with education, rehabilitation, and safety
- Reaching Out Romania, non-governmental charitable organization in Romania that helps girls ages 13 to 22 exit the sex industry
- Redlight Children Campaign, non-profit organization created by New York lawyer and president of Priority Films Guy Jacobson and Israeli actress Adi Ezroni in 2002 to combat worldwide child sexual exploitation and human trafficking
- Run for Courage, nonprofit organization that combats human trafficking
- Somaly Mam Foundation (Cambodian)
- Slavery Footprint, nonprofit organization based in Oakland, California, that works to end human trafficking and modern-day slavery.
- Stop Child Trafficking Now, organization founded by Lynette Lewis, an author and public speaker
- Stop the Traffik, campaign coalition which aims to bring an end to human trafficking worldwide
- The RINJ Foundation, Canadian-based women's group which adduces that vigorously prosecuting buyers of slaves is the way ahead to end sexual slavery
- Truckers Against Trafficking, nonprofit organization that trains truck drivers to recognize and report instances of human trafficking
- Voice of the Free (Filipino)

== Individuals ==
=== Historical ===
==== American ====
- Abigail Adams (American presidential wife and activist)
- John Quincy Adams (American President), had a long history of opposing slavery
- Bronson Alcott (American)
- Louisa May Alcott (American)
- Richard Allen (former slave, American Methodist)
- William G. Allen (American)
- Susan B. Anthony (American)
- William Arthur (American)
- Rosa Miller Avery (American)
- Gamaliel Bailey (American)
- Martha Violet Ball (American)
- Eusebius Barnard (American)
- Austin Bearse (American)
- Henry Ward Beecher (American)
- Lyman Beecher (American)
- Anthony Benezet (American Quaker)
- John Bingham, Jayhawker and Senator (American)
- James Gillespie Birney (American)
- William Birney (American)
- William Henry Brisbane (American)
- John Brown (American)
- William Wells Brown (American)
- Anson Burlingame (American)
- Aaron Burr (American politician)
- Benjamin Butler (American)
- Elizabeth Buffum Chace (American activist)
- Elizabeth Margaret Chandler American writer and journalist, columnist
- Zachariah Chandler (American)
- William L. Chaplin (American)
- Maria Weston Chapman (American)
- Salmon P. Chase (American)
- Lydia Maria Child (American)
- James Freeman Clarke (American), Unitarian minister and theologian
- Cassius Marcellus Clay (American)
- John P. Coburn (American)
- Levi Coffin (American)
- Edward Coles (American)
- Nathaniel Colver (Baptist pastor and educator, American)
- Samuel Cornish (Presbyterian of African heritage, American)
- Oringe Smith Crary (American)
- Alexander Crummell, African-American missionary
- Henry Winter Davis (American)
- Martin Delany (son of a slave, American)
- Solomon Dill (American)
- Richard Dillingham (American)
- Frederick Douglass (former slave, American politician)
- Sarah Mapps Douglass (American)
- George Hussey Earle Sr. (American politician)
- David Einhorn (American rabbi)
- Ralph Waldo Emerson (American)
- Calvin Fairbank (American)
- Sarah Harris Fayerweather (American)
- John Gregg Fee (American)
- Charles Finney (American)
- James Forten (American)
- Margaretta Forten (American)
- Abby Kelley Foster (American)
- Stephen Symonds Foster (American)
- Benjamin Franklin (American)
- Amos Noë Freeman (American)
- John C. Frémont (American)
- Matilda Joslyn Gage (American)
- Thomas Galt (American), Vice-President, Illinois Anti-Slavery Society
- Eliza Ann Gardner (American)
- James A. Garfield (American)
- Henry Highland Garnet (American)
- Thomas Garrett (American)
- William Lloyd Garrison (American)
- Abraham op den Graeff (German-American), signer of the first organized religious protest against slavery in colonial America
- Derick op den Graeff (German-American), signer of the first organized religious protest against slavery in colonial America
- Jesse Root Grant (American)
- Ulysses S. Grant (American)
- Horace Greeley (American)
- Beriah Green (American)
- Leonard Grimes (American)
- Charlotte Forten Grimké (American)
- Angelina Grimké (American)
- Sarah Moore Grimké (American)
- Hannibal Hamlin (American)
- Theophilus Harrington (American)
- Laura Smith Haviland (American)
- Lewis Hayden (former slave, American)
- Rutherford B. Hayes (American)
- Hugh Hazlett (American)
- Michael Heilprin (American rabbi)
- Hinton Rowan Helper (opposed slavery on economic grounds, American)
- James Butler "Wild Bill" Hickok (American)
- Elias Hicks (American)
- Thomas Wentworth Higginson (American)
- Thomas S. Hinde (American)
- Isaac Hopper (American)
- Julia Ward Howe (American)
- Samuel Gridley Howe (American)
- Thaddeus Hyatt (American)
- Robert G. Ingersoll (American)
- Francis Jackson (American)
- Harriet Jacobs (former slave, American)
- John Jay (American)
- Absalom Jones (American)
- Hezekiah Joslyn (American)
- Gustav Koerner (German American)
- James H, Lane (American)
- Mary Sampson Patterson Leary Langston (American)
- John Laurens (American)
- Benjamin Lay (American)
- Hart Leavitt (American), Underground Railroad operator, Massachusetts
- Joshua Leavitt (American), editor of the abolitionist newspaper The Emancipator
- Roger Hooker Leavitt (American), Underground Railroad operator, Massachusetts
- William Leggett
- Abraham Lincoln (American President)
- Rose Livingston (American)
- Toussaint L'Ouverture (former slave, a commander of the Haitian Revolution)
- Jermain Loguen (former slave, American)
- Elijah Lovejoy (American)
- James Russell Lowell (American)
- Maria White Lowell (American)
- Henry G. Ludlow (American)
- Benjamin Lundy (American)
- Samuel Joseph May (American)
- Isaac Mendenhall (American)
- Cynthia Catlin Miller (American)
- Robert Morris (American)
- Lucretia Mott (American)
- William Cooper Nell (American)
- Frederick Law Olmsted (American)
- Samuel Oughton (American), advocate of black labour rights in Jamaica)
- John Parker (former slave, American)
- Theodore Parker (American) Unitarian minister and abolitionist whose words inspired speeches by Abraham Lincoln and later by Martin Luther King Jr. ("The arc of the moral universe is long...")
- Francis Daniel Pastorius (German-American), signer of the first organized religious protest against slavery in colonial America
- Ann Terry Greene Phillips (American)
- Wendell Phillips (American)
- James Shepherd Pike (American), journalist
- Mary Ellen Pleasant (American)
- John Wesley Posey (American)
- Gabriel Prosser (insurrectionist, American slave)
- Harriet Forten Purvis (American)
- Robert Purvis (American)
- Sarah Louisa Forten Purvis (American)
- John Rankin (American)
- Hermann Raster (American)
- John D. Read (American)
- Charles Lenox Remond (American)
- Marius Racine Robinson (American)
- Emily Rakestraw Robinson (American)
- Ernestine Rose (American)
- Benjamin Rush (American)
- John Brown Russwurm (Jamaican/American)
- Richard S. Rust (American)
- Thomas Rutter (American)
- Dred Scott (American slave)
- Samuel Sewall (American)
- Samuel Edmund Sewall (American)
- William H. Seward, Secretary of State under Lincoln (American)
- Gerrit Smith (American)
- Joshua Bowen Smith (American)
- Silas Soule (American)
- Lysander Spooner (American lawyer)
- Edwin Stanton, Secretary of War under Lincoln (American)
- Elizabeth Cady Stanton (American)
- Henry Stanton (American)
- Thaddeus Stevens (American)
- Maria W. Stewart (American)
- Andrew Taylor Still (American)
- William Still (American)
- Lucy Stone (American)
- Harriet Beecher Stowe (American)
- Charles Sumner (American)
- La Roy Sunderland (American)
- Arthur Tappan (American)
- Lewis Tappan (American)
- Henry David Thoreau (American)
- John Ton (Dutch-born American)
- Charles Turner Torrey (American)
- Joseph Tracy (American)
- Sojourner Truth (American)
- Harriet Tubman (American)
- Nat Turner insurrectionist, former slave (American)
- Denmark Vesey insurrectionist, former slave (American)
- Benjamin Wade (American)
- David Walker (abolitionist) (son of a slave, American)
- Samuel Ringgold Ward (born into slavery, American)
- Theodore Dwight Weld (American)
- Charles Augustus Wheaton (American) Underground Railroad Operator, New York
- Walt Whitman (American)
- John Greenleaf Whittier (American)
- Austin Willey (American newspaper editor)
- Henry Wilson (American Vice President)
- Hiram Wilson (Canada)
- John Woolman (American Quaker)
- Elizur Wright (American)

==== Brazilian ====
- Antônio de Castro Alves (Brazilian)
- Ruy Barbosa (Brazilian)
- Luís Gama (Brazilian)
- Isabel, Princess Imperial of Brazil (Brazilian)
- Maria Tomásia Figueira Lima (Brazilian)
- Dragão do Mar (Brazilian)
- Joaquim Nabuco (Brazilian)
- José do Patrocínio (Brazilian)
- Pedro I of Brazil (Brazilian)
- Pedro II of Brazil (Brazilian)
- André Rebouças (Brazilian)
- Maria Firmina dos Reis (Brazilian)
- José Bonifácio de Andrada e Silva (Brazilian)

==== British ====
- Prince Albert of Saxe-Coburg and Gotha (German/British)
- George William Alexander (British)
- William Allen (British Quaker)
- Thomas Binney (British)
- Henry Brougham, 1st Baron Brougham and Vaux (British)
- Thomas Burchell (British Jamaican)
- Thomas Fowell Buxton (British)
- John Clarkson (British)
- Thomas Clarkson (British)
- Josiah Conder (British)
- Ottobah Cugoano (African/British)
- John Cropper, Liverpudlian trader and philanthropist
- Thomas Day (British)
- Edward James Eliot (British)
- Olaudah Equiano former slave taken from modern day Nigeria (British)
- Alexander Falconbridge (British)
- Elizabeth Heyrick (British)
- Samuel Johnson (British)
- Joseph Ketley (British)
- Fanny Kemble (British), author of Journal of a Residence on a Georgian Plantation in 1838–1839
- William Knibb (British)
- David Livingstone (Scottish)
- Zachary Macaulay (British)
- Harriet Martineau (British)
- Charles Middleton, 1st Baron Barham (British)
- Hannah More (British)
- Iolo Morganwg (British)
- William Murray, 1st Earl of Mansfield (British)
- John Newton, former slave merchant (British)
- Richard Oastler (British)
- James Edward Oglethorpe (English, founder of the Province of Georgia)
- Amelia Opie (British)
- Thomas Paine (British born)
- Mary Prince (British)
- James Ramsay (British)
- William Rathbone IV (British)
- Ignatius Sancho (first ex-slave to vote, British)
- Granville Sharp (British)
- James Sherman (British)
- Kathleen Simon (British)
- John Smith (British missionary to Demerara, Guyana)
- William Smith (British)
- Herbert Spencer (British)
- George Thompson (British)
- Henry Thornton (British)
- John Harfield Tredgold (British)
- Josiah Wedgwood (British) produced "Am I Not A Man And A Brother?" anti-slavery medallion
- John Wesley (British)
- William Wilberforce (British) Leading Parliamentary abolitionist
- Frances Wright (Scottish)

==== Canadian ====
- Henry Bibb, publisher The Voice of the Fugitive newspaper (Canadian)
- George Brown (Canadian)
- Mary Ann Shadd Cary, publisher Provincial Freeman newspaper (Canadian)
- Ward Chipman (Canadian)

==== Colombian ====
- José Hilario López (Colombian)

==== Chilean ====
- José Miguel Infante (Chilean)

==== Dutch ====
- Anna Amalia Bergendahl
- Wolter Robert Baron van Hoëvell
- Frits Moquette

==== French ====
- Jacques Pierre Brissot (French, Founder of the Society of the Friends of the Blacks)
- Marquis de Condorcet (French)
- Marie-Thérèse Lucidor Corbin (French Creole)
- Guillaume de Félice (French)
- Olympe de Gouges (French)
- Henri Grégoire (French)
- Louis X of France (Louis X Capet, 1315, Kingdom of France)
- Joseph-Elzéar Morénas (French Jew)
- Gilbert du Motier, marquis de Lafayette (French)
- Guillaume Thomas François Raynal (French)
- Maximilien Robespierre (French)
- Victor Schœlcher (French)

==== German ====
- Charles Follen (German)

==== India ====
- Periyar E. V. Ramasamy (Founder of Self Respect Movement in Southern India)

==== Iranian ====
- Zahra Khanom Tadj es-Saltaneh

==== Irish ====
- Daniel O'Connell (Irish)

==== Italian ====
- Filippo Mazzei (Italian)

==== Jamaican ====
- Samuel Sharpe (Jamaican)

==== Mexican ====
- Vicente Guerrero (Mexican)
- Miguel Hidalgo (Mexican)
- José María Morelos (Mexican)

==== Omani ====
- Qaboos bin Said

==== Peruvian ====
- Ramón Castilla, politician (Peruvian president)

==== Polish ====
- Tadeusz Kościuszko (Polish)
- Theodore de Korwin Szymanowski (Polish)

==== Puerto Rican ====
- Segundo Ruiz Belvis (Puerto Rican)
- Ramón Emeterio Betances (Puerto Rican)
- José Gualberto Padilla (Puerto Rican)
- Lola Rodríguez de Tió (Puerto Rican)

==== Saudi Arabian ====
- Faisal of Saudi Arabia

==== Spanish ====
- Julio Vizcarrondo (Spanish, born in Puerto Rico)

==== Tanzania ====
- Hamoud bin Mohammed of Zanzibar

==== Uzbekistan ====
- 'Abd al-Ahad Khan
- Muhammad Rahim Khan II of Khiva

==== Venezuelan ====
- Simon Bolivar (Venezuelan)
- José Gregorio Monagas (Venezuelan)

==== Yemeni ====
- Abdullah al-Sallal

=== Contemporary ===
- David Batstone founder of the non-profit organization Not for Sale (American)
- Don Brewster founder of Agape International Missions (American)
- Florrie R. Burke (American)
- Ansar Burney (Pakistani activist)
- Vednita Carter founder of Breaking Free (American)
- Katherine Chon co-founder of Polaris Project (American)
- Derek Ellerman co-founder of Polaris Project (American)
- Durga Ghimire (Nepali)
- Maria Grazia Giammarinaro (Italian)
- Glendene Grant mother of slave, founder of Mothers Against Trafficking in Humans (Canadian)
- Nick Grono Freedom Fund and Walk Free Foundation (Australian)
- Siddharth Kara author of Sex Trafficking: Inside the Business of Modern Slavery (2009) and Bonded Labor: Tackling the System of Slavery in South Asia (American)
- Rachel Lloyd (British)
- Rose Livingston former slave who worked to free slaves in New York City (American)
- Somaly Mam founder of Somaly Mam Foundation (Cambodian)
- Iana Matei founder of Reaching Out Romania (Romanian)
- Bukola Oriola former slave, author of Imprisoned: The Travails of a Trafficked Victim (Nigerian)
- Kathleen Simon, Viscountess Simon (British)
- Elizabeth Smart former slave, founder of Elizabeth Smart Foundation (American)
- Linda Smith (American politician) founder of Shared Hope International (American)
- Helen Sworn (English)
- Sheila White former slave (American)

== Gallery ==
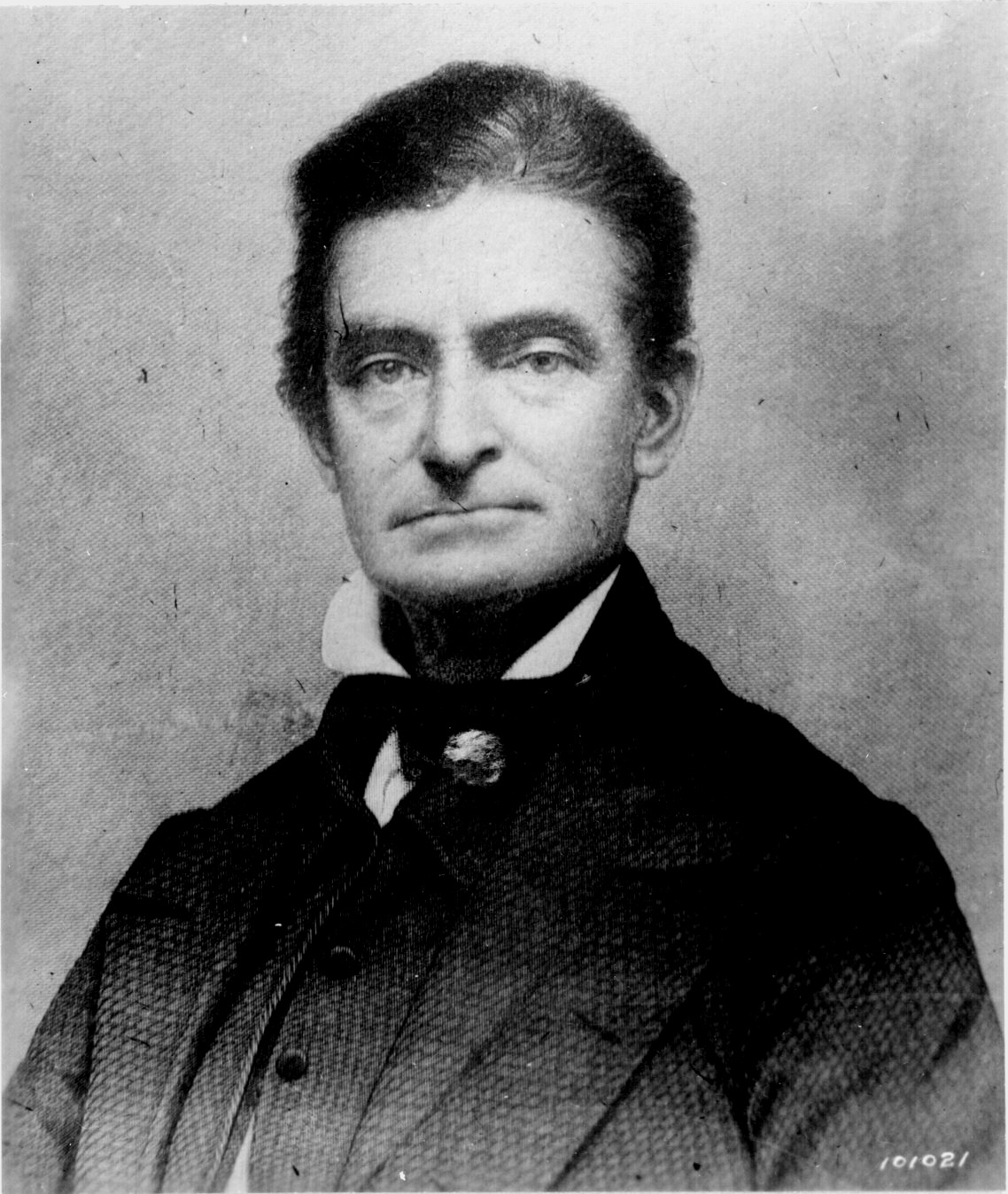
John Brown, an abolitionist who advocated armed insurrection to overthrow the institution of slavery. He organized the Pottawatomie massacre (1856) and was later executed for leading an unsuccessful 1859 raid on Harpers Ferry, West Virginia.

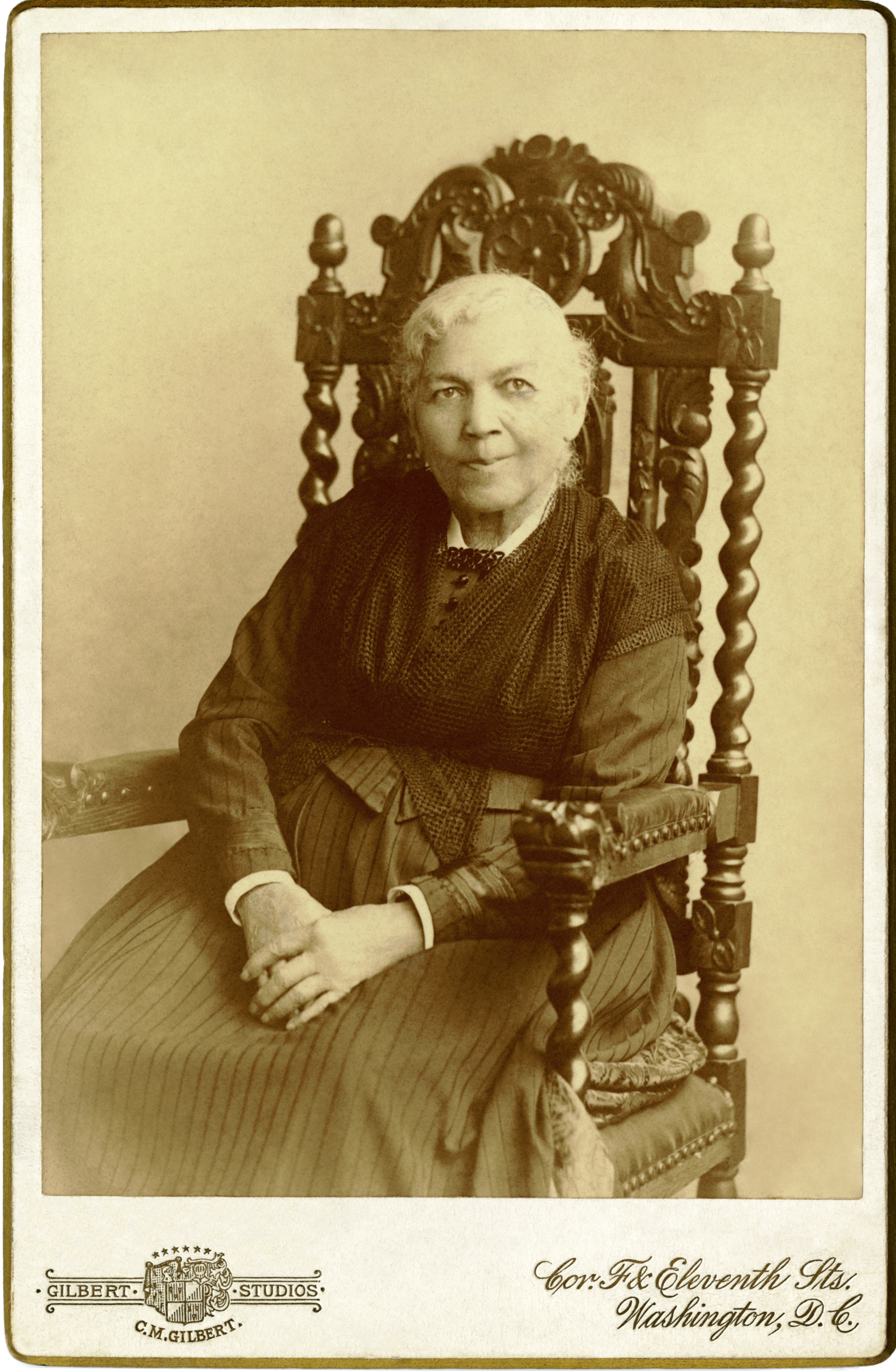
Harriet Jacobs, a former slave turned abolitionist who wrote the influential Incidents in the Life of a Slave Girl (1861).

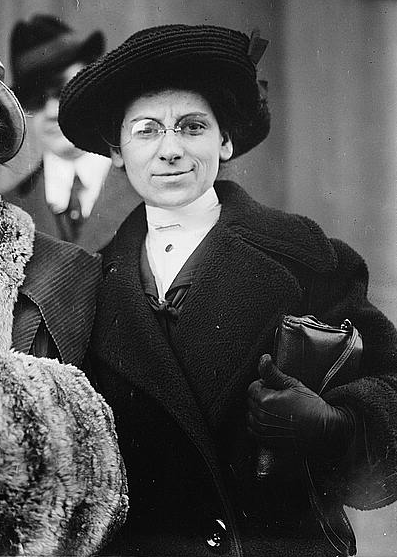
Rose Livingston, a former slave known as the Angel of Chinatown, worked to free slaves in New York City.

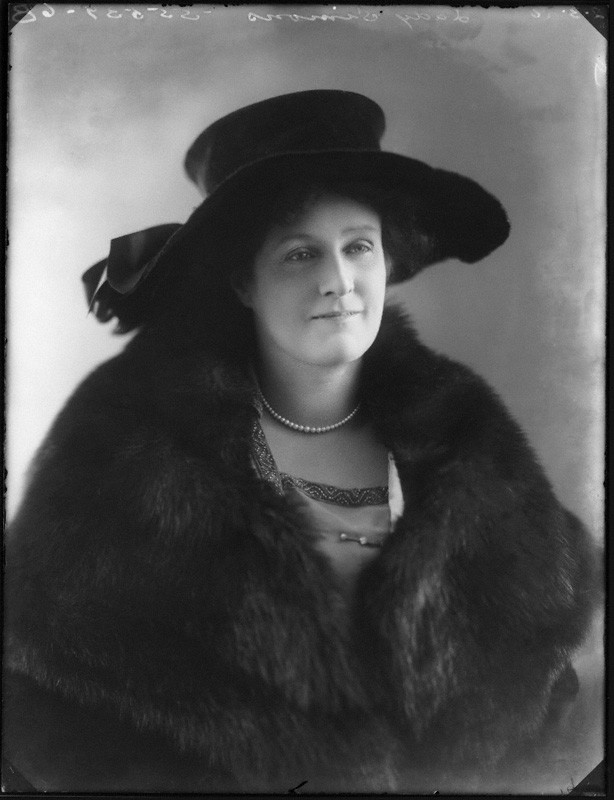
The future Viscountess Simon, knighted in 1933 for her efforts to combat remnants of chattel slavery in the British Empire.

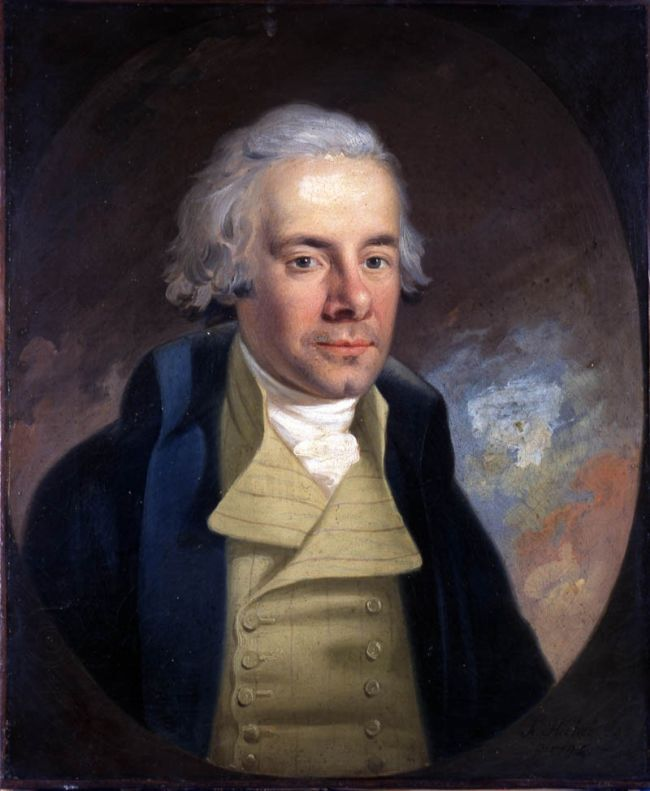
William Wilberforce, a leading English abolitionist, led Parliamentary campaign to abolish the slave trade. Campaigned for the end of slavery in British Empire, dying three days after hearing the passage of the Act through Parliament assured.

== See also ==
- List of abolitionist forerunners
- List of African-American abolitionists
- Abolitionism in the United Kingdom
- Abolitionism in the United States
- African American founding fathers of the United States
- History of slavery in the United States
- Radical Republicans
- Timeline of the civil rights movement
- Underground Railroad
