= List of organizations that combat human trafficking =

This is a list of notable organizations with a primary, or significant, commitment to ending human trafficking.

== List ==
- Advisory Committee on the Traffic in Women and Children, League of Nations organization, founded in 1920
- 8th Day Center for Justice, a Roman Catholic organization based in Chicago, Illinois
- A21 Campaign, a 501(c)(3) nonprofit, non-governmental organization that works to fight human trafficking
- ACT Alberta, a Canadian coalition of Government of Alberta representatives, non-governmental organizations, community organisations, and the Royal Canadian Mounted Police
- After Exploitation, a nonprofit organisation tracking hidden evidence on the mistreatment of slavery survivors based in the UK
- Agape International Missions, a nonprofit organization in Cambodia
- Anti-Slavery International, works at local, national and international levels to eliminate all forms of slavery around the world
- Arizona League to End Regional Trafficking, a coalition representing partnerships with law enforcement, faith-based communities, nonprofit organizations, social service agencies, attorneys and concerned citizens
- Awareness Against Human Trafficking (HAART), a non-governmental organization fighting against human trafficking in Kenya
- A Better World, based in Lacombe, Alberta, Canada
- British Red Cross, the United Kingdom body of the worldwide neutral and impartial humanitarian network
- California Against Slavery, a human rights organization directed at strengthening California state laws to protect victims of sex trafficking
- Chab Dai, a coalition founded by Helen Sworn that connects Christian organizations committed to ending sexual abuse and trafficking
- Challenging Heights, a grassroots, survivor-led NGO dedicated to ending child trafficking, reducing child slavery, and promoting children's rights in Ghana
- Coalition Against Trafficking in Women, an international non-governmental organization opposing human trafficking, prostitution, and other forms of commercial sex
- Coalition to Abolish Slavery and Trafficking, a nonprofit Los Angeles-based anti-human trafficking organization
- Covenant House, a large privately-funded agency in the Americas providing shelter, food, immediate crisis care, and other services to homeless and runaway youth.
- DeliverFund, a nonprofit intelligence organization against human trafficking in the US.
- Devatop Centre for Africa Development, a nonprofit organization in Nigeria with focus on combating human trafficking, gender-based violence, and child abuse; and providing educational support to vulnerable children
- Development and Education Programme for Daughters and Communities Centre in the Greater Mekong Subregion (DEPDC/GMS), a non-profit NGO based in Chiang Rai Province, Northern Thailand, that works to prevent and protect children and youth from being trafficked into exploitative labor conditions
- Durbar Mahila Samanwaya Committee, a collective of 65,000 sex workers in West Bengal
- ECPAT, an international non-governmental organisation and network headquartered in Thailand which is designed to end the commercial sexual exploitation of children
- EVE, an advocacy group based in Vancouver, British Columbia, Canada
- The Exodus Road, a non-profit coalition of organizations specialized in the intervention component of human trafficking, training and funding partnerships with local authorities to actively rescue people trapped in human trafficking in India, southeast Asia, and the United States
- Face to Face Bulgaria, an organization whose primary mission is to prevent cases of forced prostitution and human trafficking in Bulgaria
- Free the Slaves, dedicated to ending slavery worldwide
- Freeset, whose primary mission is to provide sustainable employment and economic empowerment to victims of sex trafficking in South Asia
- GABRIELA, a leftist Filipino organization that advocates for women's issues
- Girls Educational and Mentoring Services, a nonprofit organization that provides services to commercially sexually exploited and domestically trafficked girls and young women, based in Harlem, New York
- Global Alliance Against Traffic in Women, a network of more than 100 non-governmental organisations from all regions of the world, who share a deep concern for the women, children and men whose human rights have been violated by the criminal practice of trafficking in persons
- Global Centurion, an anti-trafficking organization fighting human trafficking by focusing on demand, based in Washington, D.C., United States
- Hagar International, which provides trauma-informed recovery and healing to survivors of trafficking, slavery and abuse in Cambodia, Vietnam, Thailand and Afghanistan
- Hope for Justice, which identifies and rescues victims, advocates on their behalf, provides restorative care which rebuilds lives and trains frontline professionals to tackle slavery
- Ing Makababaying Aksyon, a feminist service institution that seeks to empower women and work for a society that genuinely recognises and upholds women's rights
- International Abolitionist Federation, founded in 1875; the first organization against human trafficking
- International Bureau for the Suppression of the Traffic in Women and Children, founded in 1899
- International Justice Mission, a U.S.-based non-profit human rights organization that operates in countries all over the world to rescue victims of individual human rights abuse
- Love146, works to end child trafficking and exploitation through prevention education and survivor care.
- Maiti Nepal, a nonprofit organization in Nepal dedicated to helping victims of sex trafficking
- Mongolian Gender Equality Center, a non-governmental organization based in Ulaanbaatar, Mongolia
- NASHI, a Saskatoon, Saskatchewan, Canada-based organisation that opposes human trafficking by raising awareness through education
- Office to Combat Trafficking in Persons, a government agency responsible for coordinating efforts to address human trafficking in British Columbia, Canada
- Operation Underground Railroad
- Physicians for Human Rights
- Polaris, a nonprofit, non-governmental organization that works to combat and prevent modern day slavery and human trafficking
- PREDA Foundation, a charitable organization that was founded in Olongapo City, Philippines, in 1974
- Ratanak International, an organisation that rescues children from sexual slavery and then provides them with education, rehabilitation, and safety
- Reaching Out Romania, a non-governmental charitable organization in Romania that helps girls ages 13 to 22 exit the sex industry
- Redlight Children Campaign, a nonprofit organization created by New York lawyer and president of Priority Films Guy Jacobson and Israeli actress Adi Ezroni in 2002 to combat worldwide child sexual exploitation and human trafficking
- Renew Foundation, a Christian nonprofit non-government organization in the Philippines dedicated to empowering female survivors of human trafficking and prostitution in the Philippines
- Ricky Martin Foundation, an organization with the mission to advocate for the well-being of children around the world
- Ride for Refuge, a cycling event that raises awareness and funds for displaced persons, including human trafficking victims
- Run for Courage, a nonprofit organization that combats human trafficking
- Shared Hope International, a 501(c)(3) nonprofit organization which exists to rescue and restore women and children in crisis
- Slavery Footprint, a nonprofit organization based in Oakland, California, that works to end human trafficking and modern-day slavery
- Stop Child Trafficking Now, an organization founded by Lynette Lewis, an author and public speaker
- Stop the Traffik, a campaign coalition which aims to bring an end to human trafficking worldwide
- The RINJ Foundation, is a Canadian incorporated global not-for-profit health care-related non-governmental organization women's group listed with the United Nations as an NGO RINJ Women have investigated and prosecuted child slavery rings in Iraq, Ukraine, Philippines, Afghanistan and Syria. RINJ launches a global campaign titled: Don't Buy A Kid! ~ End Child Sex Trade each year reminding potential purchasers of children that they are being watched and will eventually be caught. RINJ operates safe houses, Women's Shelters and rape clinics around the world.
- Third World Movement Against the Exploitation of Women, an organization directed towards the liberation of women from all kinds of oppression and exploitation based on sex, race or class
- Thorn, a.k.a. Digital Defenders of Children; Ashton Kutcher's organization driving tech innovation to fight child trafficking and the sexual exploitation of children
- Tim Tebow Foundation, a 501c3 non-profit organization that raises awareness, supports survivors, and advocates for laws to combat trafficking. The foundation also supports other organizations that combat trafficking and child exploitation.
- Truckers Against Trafficking, a nonprofit organization that trains truck drivers to recognize and report instances of human trafficking
- Unlikely Heroes, a nonprofit that rescues and restores child victims of slavery worldwide and places them in their seven safe homes in the Philippines, Thailand, Mexico, and the United States
- Vital Voices, an international, nonprofit, non-governmental organization that works with women leaders in the areas of economic empowerment, women's political participation, and human rights
- Voice of the Free, a nonprofit, non-stock and tax-exempt non-government organization in the Philippines established in 1991
