= Bergendahl =

Bergendahl may refer to:

- Adam Bergendahl (born 1994), Swedish ice hockey player
- Anna Amalia Bergendahl (1827–1899), Dutch author, publisher, philanthropist and abolitionist
- Anna Bergendahl (born 1991), Swedish singer
- Frederick Bergendahl (1858–1889), United States Army private
- Lars Bergendahl (1909–1997), Norwegian cross country skier
- Lauritz Bergendahl (1887–1964), Norwegian Nordic skier
- Waldemar Bergendahl (1933-2022), Swedish film producer
