= Human trafficking in Arizona =

Overview of the situation of human trafficking in the U.S. state of Arizona

Human trafficking in Arizona is the illegal trade of human beings for the purposes of reproductive slavery, commercial sexual exploitation, and forced labor as it occurs in the state of Arizona, and it is widely recognized as a modern-day form of slavery. It includes "the recruitment, transportation, transfer, harboring or receipt of persons by means of threat or use of force or other forms of coercion, of abduction, of fraud, of deception, of the abuse of power, or of a position of vulnerability or of the giving or receiving of payments or benefits to achieve the consent of a person having control over another person, for the purpose of exploitation. Exploitation shall include, at a minimum, the exploitation of prostitution of others or other forms of sexual exploitation, forced labor services, slavery or practices similar to slavery, servitude or the removal of organs."

According to the U.S. State Department, Arizona is a main destination and transit point for labor and sex trafficking, both nationally and internationally. Some contributing factors include its proximity to Mexico, San Diego and Las Vegas, its warm weather, its network of freeways, and the fact that it is a major conference destination, and home to many professional sporting events. The Great Recession also hit Phoenix particularly hard, leading to a spike in homeless youth who are vulnerable to human traffickers. Cindy McCain has raised awareness of human trafficking in Arizona and across the United States and served as co-chair of the Arizona Governor Jan Brewer's Task Force on Human Trafficking.

== Laws ==
- Unlawfully Obtaining Labor or Services; classification (AZ) - Arizona Legislation making it illegal to obtain labor or services through the use of bodily harm, threatening or restraining victim, and/or withholding victim's personal records.
- Sex Trafficking; classification (AZ) - Arizona Legislation that defines what sex trafficking is. States that it is illegal to recruit, entice, harbor, transport, provide or obtain by any means another person with the intent of causing the other person to engage in prostitution by force, fraud or coercion. If a person is under the age of eighteen, it is illegal to entice, harbor, transport, provide, or obtain by any means that person with the intent of causing that person to engage in prostitution.
- Trafficking of Persons for Forced Labor or Services; classifications; definitions (AZ) - Arizona Legislation that defines labor trafficking as "transport another person or to entice, recruit, harbor, provide or otherwise obtain another person for transport by deception, coercion or force,". Also states that it is illegal to knowingly traffic another person or benefit from the trafficking of another person for labor or services.

== Demographics ==
In July 2014, Arizona State University, Office of Sex Trafficking Intervention Research conducted a survey of 246 homeless youth ages 18–25. 25% reported being victims of human trafficking with 18% of those currently being controlled by a trafficker. LGBTQ youth were significantly more likely (38%) to be trafficked than straight youth (20%). The range of age of first time being trafficked ranged from 5 to 23, with an average of age of 14.

A 2015 study by Arizona State University looked at sex trafficking among adults on probation in Maricopa county. They found that 38% of adult probation officers had a sex trafficking victim on their case load and 25.6% had a sex trafficker. Of the victims of sex trafficking, 39.3% were currently being trafficked and 92.9% were female.

== Anti-human trafficking efforts ==
Gov. Jan Brewer has put together a Task Force on Human Trafficking consisting of advocates and politicians. Following their recommendation, the Arizona police academy has incorporated sex training in the classroom and exams. In addition, the Arizona Peace Officer Standards and Training Board is distributing a sex-trafficking video for current officers.

=== Phoenix ===
In 2014, the Phoenix City Council approved a five-year plan to combat trafficking in the city. During this time, they hope to create a cultural shift that makes human trafficking unacceptable by having a Stop Human Trafficking campaign, partnering with media outlets, promoting the national hotline, putting up awareness posters. They hope to educate the media on how to report human trafficking, partner with human trafficking experts, and conduct trainings for businesses and organizations that are more likely to come in contact with victims. They plan to increase law enforcement by holding mandatory training through law enforcement, identifying runaways through partnerships with the police missing persons unit, getting a better diversion program for trafficking victims, and better technology to identify pimps and victims.

They also plan on increasing services for victims so by 2020, victims will have access to a broad continuum of care with multiple choices for services. They plan to create a database that hosts information on service provider agencies, and assess the gaps in services, especially in the first 48 hours after the first responders show up.

==== National Day of Johns ====
National Day of Johns was a sex trafficking sting in connection with Super Bowl XLIX, held in Phoenix. Almost 600 people were arrested and 68 victims were rescued. Super Bowls attract sex traffickers and many of the rescued victims said they were brought to Arizona specifically for the Super Bowl.

=== Arizona's Not Buying It ===
Arizona's Not Buying It is a campaign initiated by the Arizona Attorney General in partnership with Shared Hope International designed to fight child sex trafficking. It features several celebrities, voicing their support for the campaign, including Derrick Hall, Anthony LeBlanc, Mark Lewis, Kurt Warner, Dr. Ray Perkins, Danny White, Dan Manucci, Jay Taylor and Steve Holden.

=== Organizations ===
- The Underage Sex-Trafficking Coalition was formed in 2011 by the Arizona Attorney General. It seeks to raise public awareness, educate the community and advocate to strengthen laws about human trafficking. It began the Arizona's Not Buying It Campaign, in partnership with Shared Hope International, to fight child sex trafficking.
- Arizona League to End Regional Trafficking (ALERT) is a coalition representing partnerships with law enforcement, faith-based communities, non-profit organizations, social service agencies, attorneys and concerned citizens. ALERT helps victims of trafficking by providing: food and shelter; medical care; mental health counseling; immigration assistance; legal assistance; language interpretation; case management; and other culturally appropriate services throughout the state of Arizona.
- MOMA's House is an organization based in Laveen that helps female victims recover from sex trafficking by providing shelter, a supportive environment, and a program to help them develop life and career skills.
- Training and Resources United to Stop Trafficking (TRUST) focuses on raising awareness about human trafficking through training and providing resources.
- Coalition Against Human Trafficking - Northern Arizona (CAHT-NAZ) a coalition dedicated to providing awareness training throughout the Verde Valley and providing support to groups looking to organize new coalitions throughout Northern Arizona. https://caht-naz.org/
