= Human trafficking in Ohio =

Human trafficking in Ohio is the illegal trade of human beings for the purposes of reproductive slavery, commercial sexual exploitation, and forced labor as it occurs in the state of Ohio, and it is widely recognized as a modern-day form of slavery. It includes "the recruitment, transportation, transfer, harboring or receipt of persons by means of threat or use of force or other forms of coercion, of abduction, of fraud, of deception, of the abuse of power, forced intake of drugs, or of a position of vulnerability or of the giving or receiving of payments or benefits to achieve the consent of a person having control over another person, for the purpose of exploitation. Exploitation shall include, at a minimum, the exploitation of the prostitution of others or other forms of sexual exploitation, forced labor services, slavery or practices similar to slavery, servitude or the removal of organs."

Ohio is particularly vulnerable to human trafficking because it has both large urban centers and rural counties and a large transient and immigrant population, as well as five major highways with easy access to other states and Canada. 24 out of 88 counties have no human-trafficking training or access to victim services. A recent study estimated that between 2014-2016, 1,032 Ohio youth and young adults were victims of human trafficking. The National Human Trafficking Resource Center reported receiving 1,066 calls and emails in 2015 about human trafficking in Ohio.

== Ohio Human Trafficking Task Force ==
The Ohio Human Trafficking Task Force was created by executive order on March 29, 2012. It coordinates efforts between 11 departments to identify and rescue victims, to coordinate investigation of human trafficking cases, and to provide the services and treatment for victims. Since then, Ohio has spent $2 million on programs for trafficking victims. In Franklin County, Judge Paul Herbert established a program called Changing Actions to Change Habits (CATCH court), which is a two-year probation program for adult victims of human trafficking that allows them to have their prior convictions dismissed.

== Ohio laws ==
"H.B. 262 [The Ohio Human Trafficking Act of 2012] raised the penalty for committing the crime of human trafficking to a first-degree felony with a mandatory minimum sentence of 10–15 years, ... created a diversion program for juvenile victims to receive protection and treatment," and "allows for adult victims of human trafficking with prior convictions of prostitution or solicitation to have their records expunged."

== Advocacy organizations ==
- Central Ohio Rescue and Restore is an organization that provides "a collaborative community response to human trafficking in central Ohio through education, services, advocacy, and prosecution."
- Summit County Collaborative Against Human Trafficking is an organization centered in Summit County that seeks to increase awareness of human trafficking.

Lucas County Human Trafficking Coalition is a 71 member coalition that covers the NW Ohio region. The Human Trafficking and Social Justice Institute at the University of Toledo conducts research, teaches, and organizes to respond to human trafficking in Ohio, the U.S., and world.
