= Magdalina Valchanova =

Bulgarian model (born 1977)

Personal details
- Born: 1977 (age 48–49) Bulgaria
- Height: 175 cm (5 ft 9 in)

Magdalina Valchanova (Магдалина Вълчанова) is a Bulgarian model and beauty pageant titleholder who won Miss Universe Bulgaria 2000 and represented her country at Miss Universe 2000. She was also representative of the Bulgarian football team. She was born in 1977 in Plovdiv. In 2003 she posed for Playboy magazine.

Valchanova currently serves as the chairwoman of Face to Face Bulgaria, a non-governmental organization that prevents sex slavery in Bulgaria.
