= Oringe Smith Crary =

American poet

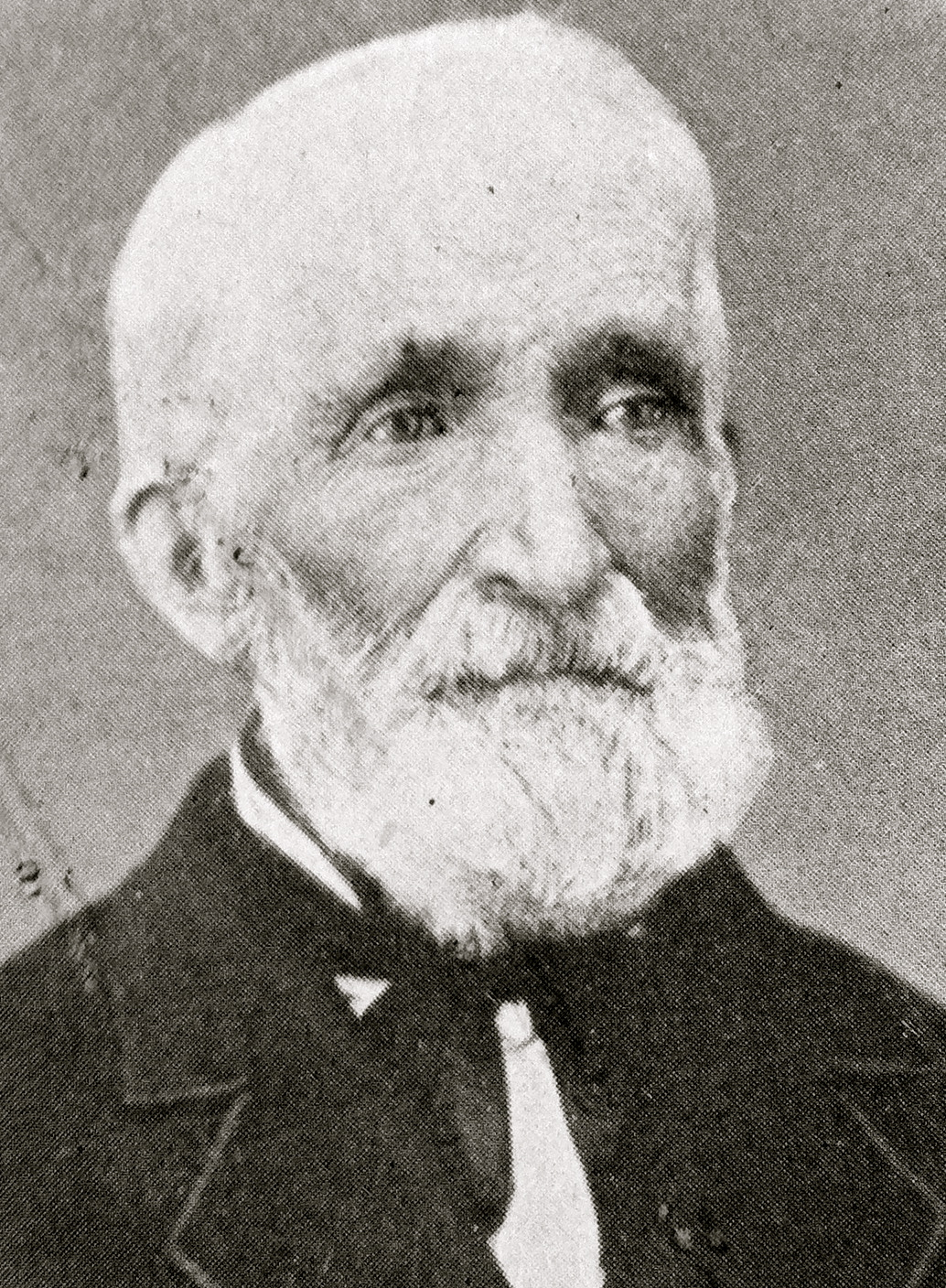
- Crary c. 1870
- Born: March 13, 1803; Swanton, Vermont, United States
- Died: March 24, 1889 (aged 86); Pierrepont, New York, United States
- Resting place: White Church Cemetery, Pierrepont, New York
- Occupations: Poet, Abolitionist
- Spouse: Minerva Sanford Crary
- Children: Eliza Jane, Marcia, Rufus Richard, George Lucian, John Leslie, Caroline, Minerva, Emerett, Emogene Maria

Oringe Smith Crary (March 13, 1803 – March 24, 1889) was an American poet and abolitionist.

== Biography ==
Oringe Smith Crary was born in Swanton, Vermont, on March 13, 1803, the eighth child of Nathan Crary, a Revolutionary War veteran and Methodist minister of Scotch descent, and Lydia Deane Crary. The family would soon after become among the first settlers of Pierrepont, New York. As a young man, Crary worked in Pierrepont as a teacher, later serving as school commissioner. He was noted to be "quite apt at versification" from a young age.

Crary's poetry was distinguished by its often graphic depictions of American slavery (Burning of the Slave, Dialogue Between the Devil and the Southern Minister).

The abolitionist Reverend George Pegler recounts in his memoirs how, after delivering public addresses against slavery, he would invite Crary to recite his verse to those gathered. Crary's poems were described as having a "thrilling effect upon the audience" and "would often bring the house down." Pegler concludes in his memoir that "by this means [Crary] doubtless rendered our cause essential service." Crary also had participation in the Underground Railroad, helping to usher fugitive slaves through Northern New York so that they could escape to freedom in Canada.

Crary's poetry was published posthumously along with that of his son in the 1914 book Poetical Works of Oringe Smith Crary and George Lucian Crary. In the preface to that book, Crary is characterized as having been "known as the off-hand Pierrepont Poet over a wide section of country" and having associated with both New York State Senator Preston King and New York State Governor Silas Wright, "who spoke of his poetry in the highest terms of praise."

On January 18, 1888, Crary was admitted to the St. Lawrence County Poor House as suffering from "old age and destitution." He died there the following year, at the age of 86.

== Legacy ==
Though primarily regarded for his elegies and his poetry decrying slavery through religious motifs, Crary composed in a variety of styles, including dramatic verse, light poetry, and historical poetry.

Oringe Smith Crary is the great-great-great-uncle of geophysicist and Arctic explorer Albert Paddock Crary. He is also the great-great-great-great-grandfather of film director Scott Crary.

Crary appears as the character Jejd Feary in Irving Bacheller's novel Eben Holden, published in 1900.

== Selected list of works ==
They made me fat; they paid me well,
To cry down abolition;
I slept I died, I woke in Hell—
How alter'd my condition.
I now am in a sea of fire,
Where fury ever rages.
I am a slave and can't get free,
And must be so for ages.
Yes when the sun and moon shall fade,
And fire the rocks dissever,
I must sink down beneath the shade
And feel God's wrath for ever.

— Excerpted from Dialogue Between the Devil and the Southern Minister (1837)

Poetry

- "Bethelehem of Judea"
- "Burning of the Slave"
- "The Day of Judgement"
- "Death of an Only Son"
- "Death of Lucy May"
- "The Death of Silas Wright"
- "Death The Cruel Monster"
- "Dialogue Between The Devil and The Southern Minister"
- "A Dog's Sad Experience"
- "The Drunkard's Home"
- "The Golden Wedding"
- "The Shadow of a Shade"
- "A Soldier's Farewell"

Poetry collections

- Poetical Works of Oringe Smith Crary and George Lucian Crary (1914)

== See also ==
- List of abolitionists
