= Human trafficking in Kenya =

Kenya ratified the 2000 UN TIP Protocol in January 2005.

In 2008 the Government of Kenya did not fully comply with the minimum standards for the elimination of human trafficking. In 2008 it was reported that Kenya's anti-trafficking efforts improved markedly over the reporting period, particularly through greater investigations of suspected trafficking cases.

In 2010, Kenya passed the Counter-trafficking in persons act which criminalizes human trafficking. However, the act has been poorly implemented and has had little impact on curbing human trafficking.

The U.S. State Department's Office to Monitor and Combat Trafficking in Persons placed the country in "Tier 2" in 2017. Their efforts remain uncoordinated and lack strong oversight, creating an environment conducive to trafficking. The country remained at Tier 2 in 2023.

In 2023, the Organised Crime Index noted that the country was part of a well-used trafficking route from the Horn of Africa to the Arabian Peninsula; it also noted the lack of support and shelter for victims.

== Prosecution (2008) ==
The government failed to punish acts of trafficking during the reporting period, but demonstrated significantly increased law enforcement activity throughout the reporting period. Kenya does not prohibit all forms of trafficking, though it criminalises the trafficking of children and adults for sexual exploitation through its Sexual Offenses Act, enacted in July 2006, which prescribes penalties that are sufficiently stringent and commensurate with those for rape; however, the law is not yet widely used by prosecutors. The Employment Act of 2007 outlaws forced labour and contains additional statutes relevant to labour trafficking. In September 2007, relevant government agencies provided comments on a draft comprehensive human trafficking bill to the Attorney General's office, which continues to work with NGOs to further refine the bill. Police opened investigations into a number of significant cases during the reporting period, including the suspected trafficking of children by two school teachers in Kirinyaga District. In October 2007, police in Malindi arrested an Italian national on suspicion of human trafficking, facilitating child prostitution, and drug trafficking. Upon the conclusion of a separate police investigation, two women were charged with child defilement and child prostitution after luring a 14-year-old girl to their home and forcing her into prostitution. Two children trafficked to Tanzania for forced labour were rescued by Kenyan officials and placed in a children's home; the investigation is ongoing as police believe the perpetrators are harbouring an additional 40 children and six adults in forced labour. Six people in Bomet District and Nandi District of Rift Valley Province were charged with the sale and trafficking of children. The Police Commissioner worked with Interpol to investigate the suspected trafficking of a Kenyan girl to the Netherlands and four children to Ireland. The Ministry of Home Affairs began, for the first time, collecting information on trafficking cases from the police, media, foreign governments, and UNODC. Corruption among law enforcement authorities and other public officials hampered efforts to bring traffickers to justice. Some anti-trafficking activists made credible claims that, in certain areas, police officials were complicit in trafficking activities.

== Protection (2008) ==
The government made efforts during the reporting period to improve protective services provided to trafficking victims. Kenyan officials removed 14 children from situations of trafficking in Nandi and placed them in a children's home. The government referred two additional trafficking victims to IOM for assistance during the reporting period, and ensured the well-being of a number of other victims. City Council Social Services Departments in Nairobi, Mombasa, and Kisumu operated shelters to rehabilitate street children vulnerable to forced labour and commercial sexual exploitation; the government provided services to children exploited in the commercial sex industry at these facilities. In partnership with an NGO, the Ministry of Home Affairs provided and refurbished a building to house a toll-free hotline that enables children and adults to report cases of child trafficking, labour, and abuse. Staff members were hired and trained to serve as counselors and refer callers to government and NGO service providers. In June 2007, the Department of Home Affairs' Children's Services Unit hired an additional 180 Chief Children's Officers; during the reporting period, several children's officers posted throughout the country were involved in trafficking investigations and provided counselling and follow-up to child trafficking victims. Fifteen newly appointed Kenyan ambassadors received a first-ever briefing on human trafficking at Kenya's Foreign Service Institute; preparations are underway for a comprehensive briefing from the Ministries of Labor and Home Affairs and IOM for mid-grade and junior officers on their responsibilities in assisting Kenyan victims abroad. The government encourages victims' assistance in the investigation and prosecution of trafficking crimes, and ensures that they are not inappropriately incarcerated or otherwise penalised for unlawful acts committed as a direct result of being trafficked. The government does not, however, provide legal alternatives to the removal of victims to countries where they would face hardship or retribution.

== Prevention (2008) ==
The Government of Kenya made significant progress in publicly highlighting the dangers of human trafficking and taking steps to combat it during the reporting period. On numerous occasions, senior government officials, including the vice-president, spoke publicly about trafficking and attended many awareness-raising events, including the Day of the African Child in June. The Kenyan media, especially the government-owned Kenya Broadcasting Corporation, regularly reported cases of suspected human trafficking. In July 2007, the government established the National Steering Committee to Combat Human Trafficking under the leadership of the Ministry of Home Affairs. Its Sub-Committee appointed to draft a national action plan received two days of training from IOM, after which it convened three drafting sessions and presented an initial outline of the plan in October. Officers from the Ministries of Youth and Labor received anti-trafficking training at IOM workshops in November and December 2007. In July 2007, the Malindi District Commission established and chaired a district-level committee on child sex tourism. In June 2007, a German national was arrested and charged with sexually exploiting two trafficked children from Nyanza at Likoni Children's Home. There were no reports of the Kenyan government's efforts to provide anti-trafficking training for its troops before deployment on international peacekeeping missions. Non-governmental organizations such as Awareness Against Human Trafficking (HAART) are working on ending human trafficking in Kenya.
