= Frits Moquette =

Dutch nineteenth-century abolitionist (1836 – 1915)

Ds. Frédéric Jules Pierre Moquette
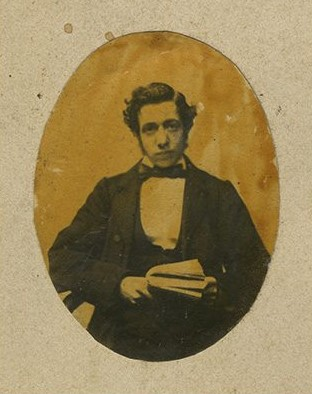
- Frits Moquette, 19-century Dutch abolitionist
- Born: June 15, 1836; Amsterdam, Netherlands
- Died: November 9, 1915 (aged 79); Rotterdam, Netherlands
- Spouse: Rudolphina Johanna Krijt (1840–1928) (marriage on June 21, 1865)
- Children: daughter Hermine Christine Hélène Moquette (1869-1945), son Frederic Jules Pierre Moquette (1871-1931)
- Parent(s): Pierre Moquette, Christina Hermina Nahlop
- Religion: Protestant Christianity
- Church: Dutch Reformed Church
- Congregations served: Jutphaas, Sluis, Hijkersmilde, Sneek and Rotterdam

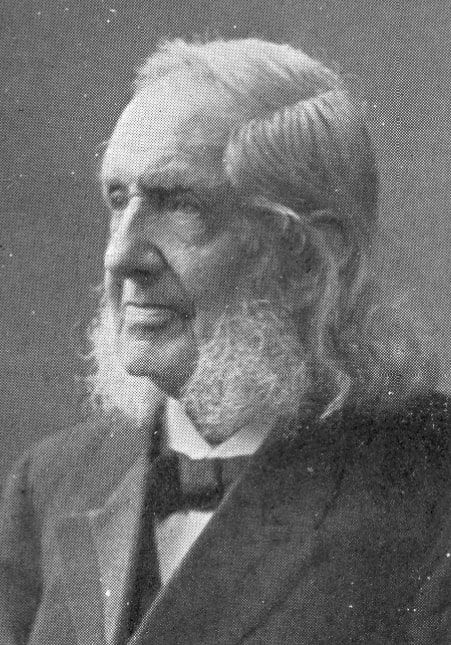
Rev. Moquette, around 1908

Frédéric Jules Pierre (Frits) Moquette (Amsterdam, 15 June 1836 - Rotterdam, 9 November 1915) was a Dutch abolitionist and protestant minister.

== Career ==
As a boy, Moquette read the Dutch translation De negerhut van Oom Tom of Harriet Beecher Stowe's novel Uncle Tom's Cabin and letters sent by his father Pierre Moquette from the plantation L'Hermitage on the cruel treatment of black slaves in Surinam. These readings inspired him at the age of 17 to become the founding president of the Dutch Jongelings Genootschap ter Afschaffing van Slavernij (Youth Society for the Abolition of Slavery) on 13 November 1853. Members should be at least 15 years of age and no older than 23. The Latin motto of the Society was "Servitus Generis Humani Flagitum" (Slavery is the scourge of mankind). Moquette then was a pupil of the Amsterdam Stedelijk Gymnasium, the Amsterdam municipal gymnasium.

Later, Moquette studied theology in Utrecht (1856, 1859) and Amsterdam (1856), became a kandidaat for the ministry in the Walloon church (1861) and subsequently served as a Dutch Reformed Church minister at Jutphaas, Sluis, Hijkersmilde, Sneek and Rotterdam until his retirement there.

As a minister in Sneek, he strove to reduce the influence of landowners, the so-called floreenplichtigen, on church management. An expert on church law, he later opposed the juridical claims on church property of the 1886 separatist Doleantie led by Abraham Kuyper.

== Publications ==
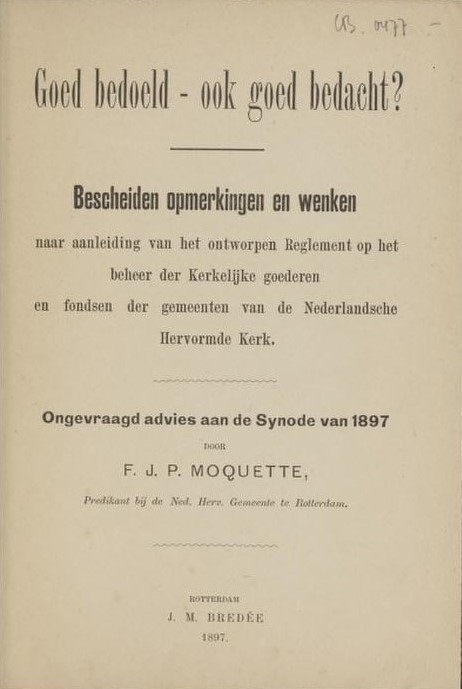
F.J.P. Moquette: Goed bedoeld - ook goed bedacht?, 1897. Title page.

Moquette's publications include:

- Brieven van Fréderic Jules Pierre Moquette (1836-1915) aan Barthold Jacob Lintelo de Geer van Jutphaas (1816-1903) Verzameling: De Geer van Jutphaas, port. 23 (in Dutch). OCLC 798331771.
- Moquette, Nederlandse Hervormde Kerk Synode, F. J. P. (1897). Goed bedoeld, ook goed bedacht? : bescheiden opmerkingen en wenken naar aanleiding van het ontworpen reglement op het beheer der kerkelijke goederen en fondsen der gemeenten van de Nederlandsche Hervormde Kerk, ongevraagd advies aan de Synode van 1897 (in Dutch). Rotterdam: J.M. Bredée. OCLC 8006646. Full text online "Goed bedoeld - ook goed bedacht?". delpher.nl.

=== Translations by Moquette ===
- Beyschlag, Willibald (1866). De opstanding van Christus en hare jongste bestrijding door Strauss : eene redevoering (in Dutch). Translated by Moquette, F.J.P. OCLC 65294029. concerning the historical bible criticism of Jesus' resurrection by David Strauss.
- de Pressensé, Edmond (1869). Jezus Christus, zijn tijd, leven en werk. De godgeleerde bibliotheek (in Dutch). Translated by Moquette, F.J.P. Utrecht: Kemink. OCLC 905772926. Translation from the French of Edmond de Pressensé: Jésus-Christ. Son temps, sa vie, son oeuvre. Paris, 1865.
