= Nic McKinley =

CIA operative

Nicholas McKinley is a former Central Intelligence Agency (CIA) operative and US Air Force veteran. He is also the founder of DeliverFund and AI company, 10 Point Data.

== Early life and education ==
Kinley is not originally from Montana, but currently resides there. He studied online at Harvard Extension School (HES) and earned a Bachelor of Liberal Arts.

== Career ==
McKinley's professional journey began in the United States Air Force, where he served eleven years as a pararescueman (PJ) within the Special Operations community. His duties involved performing high-risk rescue missions and providing medical care in combat zones. McKinley joined the CIA in 2007 as an operative in the agency's Directorate of Operations component, where he gathered intelligence on global threats. During his time as a CIA Operative, he was nearly abducted at a checkpoint by terrorists while stationed in North Africa, but managed to negotiate his way out of the situation without the use of physical violence. He left the CIA in 2014 to start a family and establish the non-profit organization DeliverFund. In its first three years, DeliverFund produced intelligence leading to the arrest of four pimps. The organization expanded in 2018, assisting law enforcement in the arrest of 19 traffickers and rescuing 17 victims. In the first nine months of 2019, DeliverFund helped arrest 25 traffickers and 64 buyers of underage sex.

As part of a team of special operations experts, he also assisted in the evacuation of the Afghan girls' soccer team to Lisbon, Portugal, following the Taliban takeover in the summer of 2021.

In early 2026 McKinley garnered national attention for coming out against Discord, Minecraft, and Roblox for hosting 764, a satanic extremist group, calling on parents to protect their children from the organization and these platforms.

== Personal life ==
His experiences at the CIA have led to comparisons by the news media Vice with the fictional character Jack Ryan, a CIA analyst and field operative created by author Tom Clancy. He is married.
