= Dames-Comité ter Bevordering van de Evangelieverkondiging en de Afschaffing der Slavernij =

Dames-Comité ter Bevordering van de Evangelieverkondiging en de Afschaffing der Slavernij (Ladies Committee for the Promotion of the Proclamation of the Gospel and the Abolition of Slavery) was an abolitionist organization founded in the Netherlands in 1856.

The purpose was the campaign for the abolition of slavery in the Dutch colonial empire, specifically in Surinam. It was the second Dutch abolitionist organization and one of the two during the Dutch anti-slavery campaign. It was also the first abolitionist organization to accept female members. It is also known as the first political organization for women in the Netherlands.

== History ==
The Netherlands had abolished the slave trade in 1814 due to British pressure, but there had been no Dutch organized abolition movement. The abolitionist campaign in the Netherlands started in 1842, when the Nederlandsche Maatschappij ter Bevordering van de Afschaffing der Slavernij (NMBAS) was founded as a response to a speech by the British abolitionist Elizabeth Fry in 1840. The NMBAS petitioned king William II, who answered via his colonial minister Jean Chrétien Baud that the abolition of slavery was unavoidable, but that it must be postponed for financial reasons. The king asked the abolitionists to abstain from further activity to avoid unrest and instability in the colonies and damage to the economy until the emancipation could be enforced.

In 1853 the Dutch translation of Uncle Tom's Cabin was published in the Netherlands. The book caused the resurrection of the Dutch abolitionist campaign and caused the Nederlandsche Maatschappij ter Bevordering van de Afschaffing der Slavernij (NMBAS) to resume their activity after a decade of passivity. NMBAS however did not accept women as formal members. It was not considered suitable for women to become publicly involved in a political issue. The philanthropist and writer Anna Amalia Bergendahl took the initiative to found the Ladies Committee in 1856.

The Ladies Committee organized lottery sales, and produced handicrafts and embroidery, images, ornaments, drawings and other objects to sell or use as prices in the lotteries for the benefit of the cause. The big project of the Ladies Committee was to raise money to buy slaves in Surinam and then manumit them. Already during the year of its foundation, in 1856, 79 slaves in Surinam was bought and manumitted by the Ladies Committee. After manumission, the former slaves where to be assisted as well as instructed in Christianity. Their work complemented to work by the NMBAS, who petitioned the government for abolition.

The combined work of the NMBAS and the Ladies Committee attracted a great deal of public interest and support for abolition. The issue was finally raised in the House of Representatives and the Dutch government eventually promised to put forward a suggestion of abolition of slavery. Partial emancipation was reached when slavery in the Dutch East Indies was abolished in 1860. The goal was finally reached when slavery in the Dutch West Indies with the Emancipation Act in 1863.

== See also ==
- Edinburgh Ladies' Emancipation Society
- Ladies' London Emancipation Society
