= Hijkersmilde =

- Hamlet
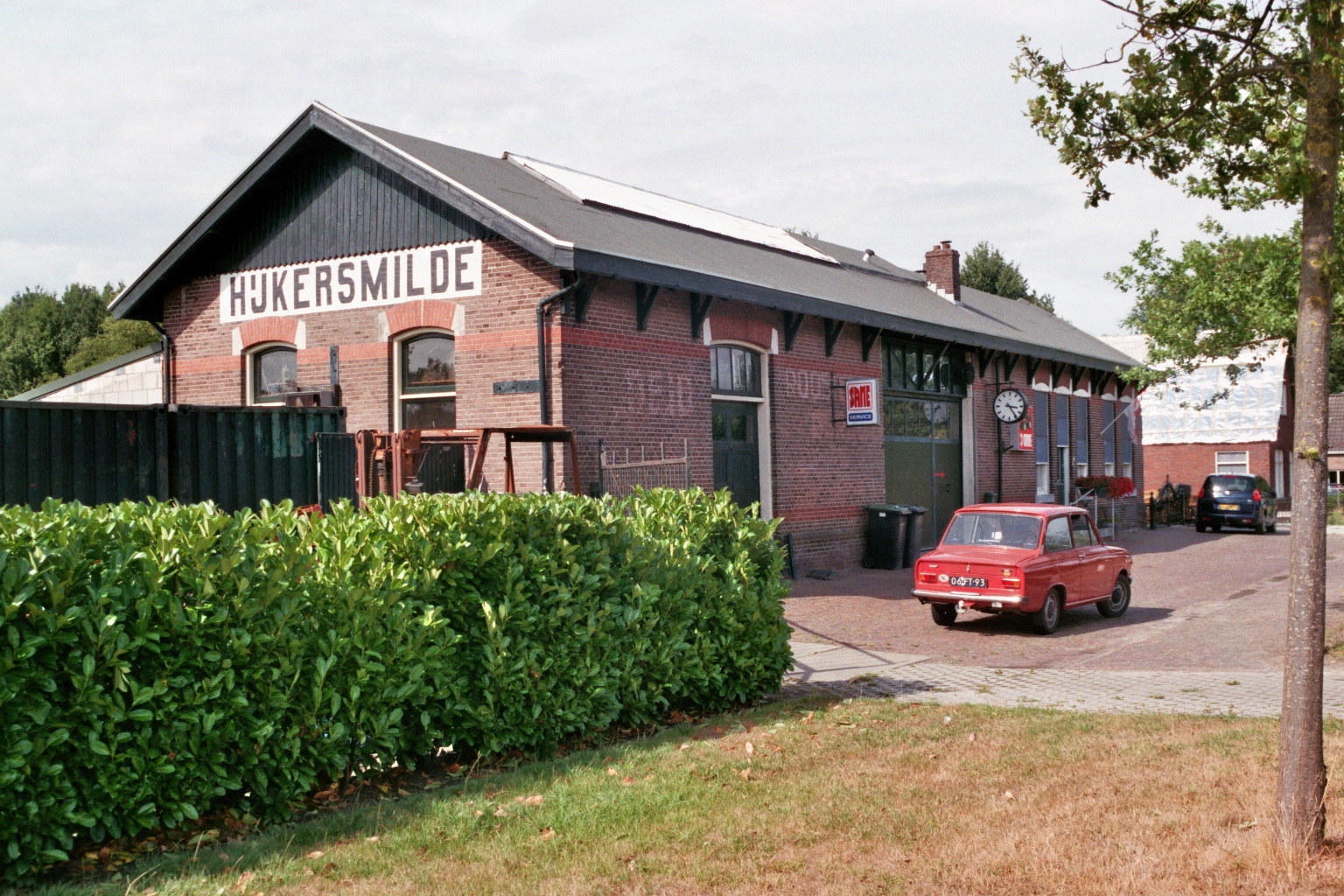
- Former train station of Hijkersmilde with a DAF 46 (2018)

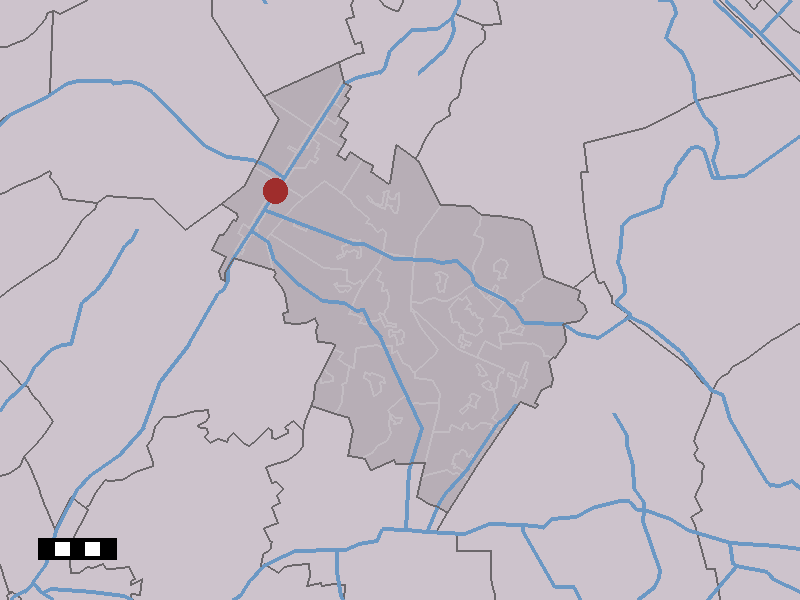
- Hijkersmilde in the municipality of Midden-Drenthe.

- Location in the Netherlands Hijkersmilde (Netherlands)
- Coordinates: 52°56′7″N 6°25′52″E
- Country: Netherlands
- Province: Drenthe
- Municipality: Midden-Drenthe
- Time zone: UTC+1 (CET)
  - Summer (DST): UTC+2 (CEST)
- Postal code: 9422
- Dialing code: 0592

Hijkersmilde is a hamlet in the Dutch province of Drenthe. It is a part of the municipality of Midden-Drenthe, and lies about 13 km southwest of Assen. Between 1913 and 1933, it had a train station.
