= Ride for Refuge =

Charity non-competitive cycling event

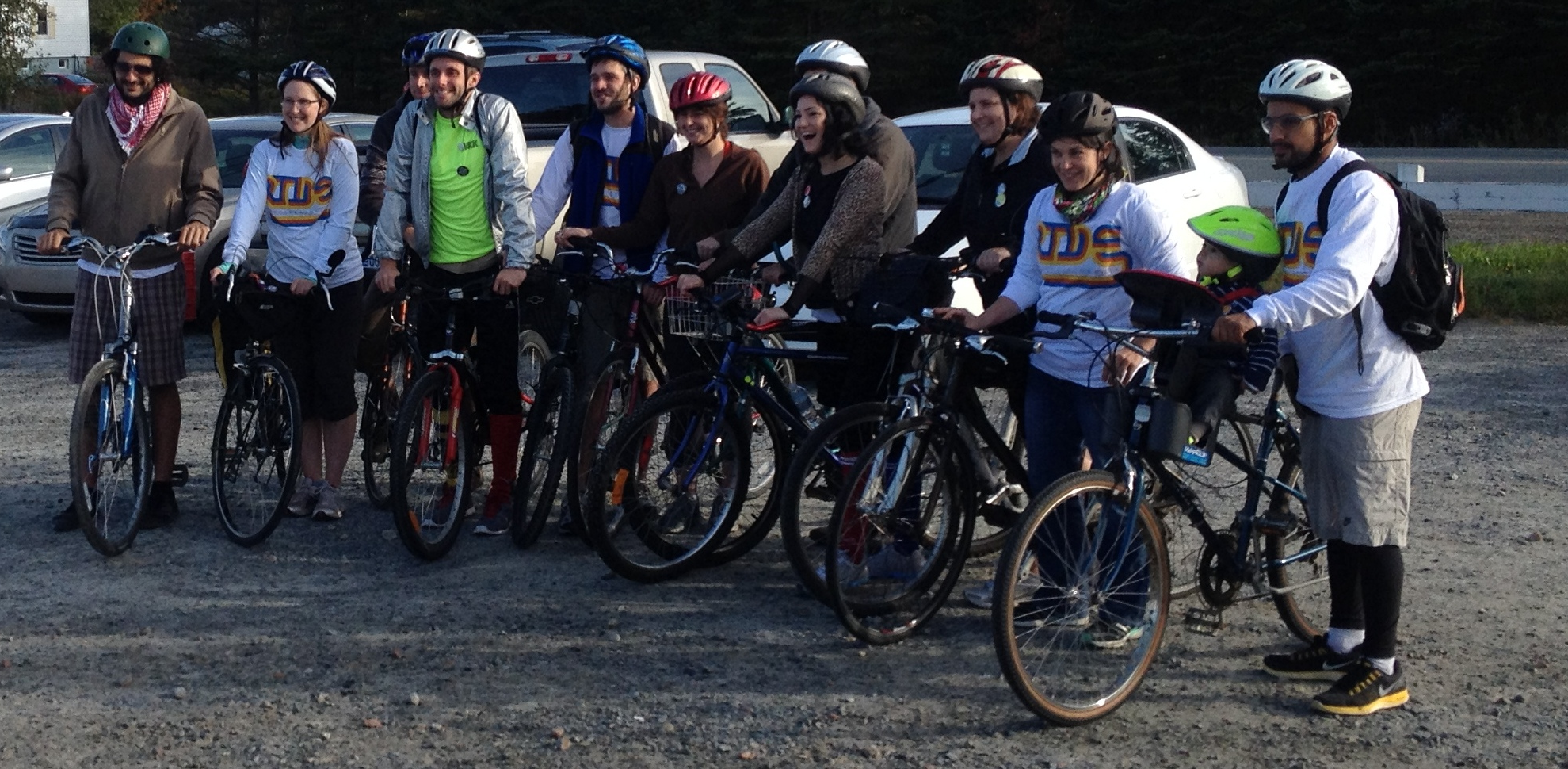
- Participants in the 2013 Ride for Refuge in Halifax, Nova Scotia, Canada
- Formation: 2004
- Type: NGO
- Purpose: To raise awareness and funds for the displaced, vulnerable and exploited
- Headquarters: Kitchener, Ontario, Canada
- Location: North America
- Parent organization: Blue Sea Philanthropy
- Website: rideforrefuge.org

Ride for Refuge is a non-competitive cycling event that partners with 175+ independent charities annually and raises awareness and funds for displaced persons, the vulnerable, and the exploited. The event occurs internationally, at locations in Canada and the United States. Ride for Refuge was started in Canada in 2004, by the Christian missionary organization International Teams Canada. In its first year, Ride for Refuge took place in one city, Kitchener, Ontario, and there were only 25 cyclists. As of 2014, the Ride for Refuge has raised more than $5,000,000.00 for their charitable partners. Teams that enter in the event can choose from a list of approved charities for whom to fundraise. Teams can choose to support orphans, homeless people, refugees, human trafficking victims, and other displaced peoples.
