= DeliverFund =

U.S. nonprofit organization

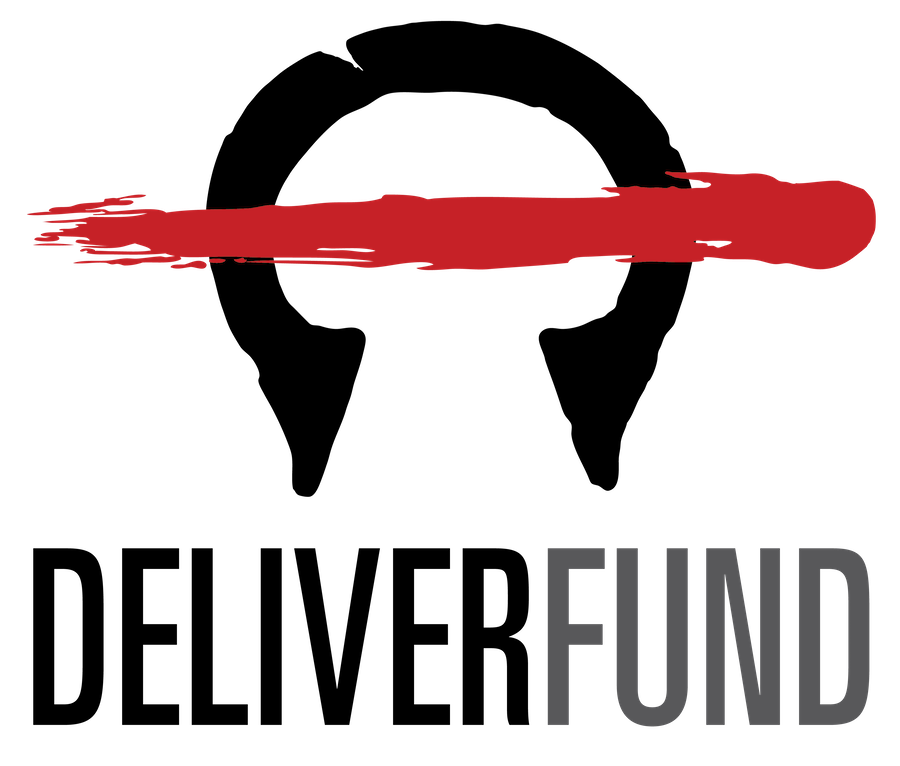
- Logo for the nonprofit organization DeliverFund
- Formation: 2014
- Founders: Nic McKinley; Jeremy Mahugh
- Purpose: To counter human trafficking by leveraging cutting-edge technology to identify criminals and bring them to justice
- Website: www.deliverfund.org

DeliverFund is a non-governmental 501(c)(3) organization focused on targeting human traffickers in the United States using counterterrorism methodology and technology. It was founded in 2014 by Nic McKinley, a former CIA officer and a United States Air Force Pararescueman, and Jeremy Mahugh, a former member of the US Special Operations and a Navy SEAL sniper.

DeliverFund works to combat human trafficking, which encompasses sex trafficking and labor trafficking, by using the counterterrorism methodology and tactics its founders employed during their service overseas. Using technology to identify human trafficking in illicit ads, they send actionable intelligence collected to law enforcement.

== History ==
DeliverFund was founded in 2014 after Nic McKinley encountered child trafficking while serving abroad and noticed there was no central governmental organization dedicated to combatting human trafficking in the United States. In 2019, the organization moved its headquarters from Albuquerque, New Mexico, to Dallas, Texas, taking over Backpage's former office.

== Programs and operations ==
DeliverFund assists its law enforcement partners across the country by providing intelligence packages and training on its technology and methodology. Analysts assisted law enforcement partners in California during Operation Reclaim and Rebuild in 2020 and 2021. The operation with San Luis Obispo County Counter Human Trafficking team led to the recovery of a 15-year old teen who was reported missing out of Nevada. DeliverFund has been involved with counter human trafficking operations at events such as the Super Bowl.

In September 2021, it assisted in the extraction of the Afghan girls' soccer team from Afghanistan to Portugal.

DeliverFund has partnered with researchers who received a National Science Foundation grant to fight human trafficking by studying the problem and proposing solutions on how to train law enforcement and other organizations to do their jobs more effectively.
