= Adam Bergendahl =

Swedish ice hockey player

- Born: June 25, 1994 (age 31) Sundsvall, Sweden
- Height: 5 ft 10 in (178 cm)
- Weight: 190 lb (86 kg; 13 st 8 lb)
- Position: Right wing
- Shoots: Right
- Hockeytvåan team Former teams: Njurunda SK; Timrå IK
- Playing career: 2013–present

Adam Bergendahl (born June 25, 1994) is a Swedish ice hockey player. He is currently playing with Njurunda SK of the Hockeytvåan.

Bergendahl played one game in the Elitserien (now the SHL) with Timrå IK during the 2012–13 Elitserien playoffs.
