= Katherine Chon =

- Citizenship: United States
- Education: Brown University (Sc.B.); Harvard Kennedy School
- Occupations: social activist, entrepreneur
- Known for: Co-founder of Polaris Project, anti-slavery activism
- Title: Senior Advisor in Trafficking in Persons at the U.S. Department of Health and Human Services

Katherine Chon is the co-founder of Polaris Project in the United States. She started the organization immediately upon graduation with fellow Brown University student Derek Ellerman in 2002 after learning about the problem of human trafficking during her undergraduate studies. She has testified before Congress concerning the scope of human traffickingand has won numerous awards for her work in the field. She is currently a Senior Advisor in Trafficking in Persons at the U.S. Department of Health and Human Services.

== Founding of Polaris Project ==
Polaris Project is a leading organization in the United States combating all forms of human trafficking and serving both U.S. citizens and foreign national victims, men, women, and children, combatting both labor and sex trafficking. The organization uses a holistic strategy, using experience gained through working with survivors to guide the creation of long-term solutions. The organization supports stronger laws, operates the National Human Trafficking Resource Center hotline (1-888-373-7888), provides trainings on recognizing and combatting human trafficking and provides direct services to survivors of human trafficking in Washington, D.C. and Newark, New Jersey. They provide services to clients who have survived human trafficking in the Washington, DC and Newark, NJ areas.

== Educational background ==
- 2002 Brown University, Sc.B. in Psychology
- 2010 Harvard Kennedy School

== Awards ==
- 2005 Do Something Brick Award for Social Entrepreneurship, Presented by President Bill Clinton
- 2007 Brown University's John Hope Award for Community Service
- Center for Social Innovation Fellowship from the Stanford Graduate School of Business
- 2007 "Running Start Women to Watch Award" from Lifetime Television
- 2009 Harlequin "More Than Words Award"
- 2010 Diane von Furstenburg "People's Voice Award"
- 2010 Named one of the 50 most influential women in the world by Woman's Day magazine
- 2013 Named 2013 Power of One Award from the Illinois Holocaust Museum and Education Center
