= Truckers Against Trafficking =

U.S. nonprofit organization

- Abbreviation: TAT
- Formation: 2009; 17 years ago
- Type: NGO
- Purpose: To oppose human trafficking
- Location: Colorado
- Region served: United States
- Members: Truck drivers
- Official language: English language
- Executive Director: Kendis Paris
- Affiliations: Pilot Flying J Love's; Truckload Carriers Association
- Website: truckersagainsttrafficking.org

Truckers Against Trafficking (TAT) is an American nonprofit organization that trains truck drivers to recognize and report instances of human trafficking. It was founded in Oklahoma in 2009 and teaches truck drivers about the results of human trafficking. It is now based in Colorado, and its executive director is Kendis Paris.

TAT produces anti-trafficking materials which are commonly seen throughout the trucking industry. They have teamed up with law enforcement agencies and trucking companies to provide training on identifying sex trafficking, and some companies require their drivers to go through it. Through their efforts, they have freed hundreds of human trafficking victims. According to the National Human Trafficking Resource Center, the majority of truck drivers who report tips learned about them through TAT.

The organization began a partnership with Pilot Flying J in 2011, Love's in 2013, and the Truckload Carriers Association in 2013. In 2012, the Ottawa, Ontario, Canada-based Persons Against the Crime of Trafficking in Humans was inspired by TAT to initiate TruckSTOP, a campaign that teaches truck drivers how to identify human trafficking victims. TAT was promoted in "Killer Truckers", a 2013 television special by Investigation Discovery. Also in 2013, Nevada Attorney General Catherine Cortez Masto spoke highly of TAT.

In one successful execution of TAT training, a truck driver called 911 after suspecting human trafficking in one situation, which precipitated the arrest and subsequent conviction of 31 traffickers, the release of nine trafficking victims, and the fall of an organized crime ring that had been active in 13 U.S. states.

== See also ==
- Sex trafficking in the United States § Truck stops
