= Iana Matei =

Romanian activist (born 1960)

Iana Matei is a Romanian activist and founder of Reaching Out Romania, an organisation which aims to find and rehabilitate victims of forced prostitution and sex trafficking.

== Early life ==
Iana Matei was born in Orăștie, Romania. Her mother was a pentathlete, and her father was a football coach. When Matei was three years old, her family moved to Bucharest due to her father's work, then later moved to the industrial city of Pitești.

Matei met her husband Dmitri while she was restoring the Ghica Tei palace. They married and had a son. Matei later divorced Dmitri due to domestic violence, abuse, and alcohol abuse issues.

In 1989, at the start of the Romanian Revolution, Matei participated in riots and other protest activities against the Communist government. After an incident where Matei lost her bag with her identity documents during a protest in University Square, she believed it was no longer safe to stay in the country and fled. She left her son with her mother and illegally immigrated to Serbia, where she was captured and sentenced to twenty days of imprisonment. During her confinement, Matei went on a hunger strike, insisting that a representative of the United Nations High Commissioner for Refugees (UNHCR) visit her and acknowledge her presence. After her sentence was completed, Matei was relocated to a Serbian refugee camp, where she was hired as a translator for UNHCP. Matei's son reunited with her from Romania, and the two moved to Australia and have become involved with humanitarian work.

On January 20, 2010, Matei was named "European of the Year" by Reader's Digest.

Matei published A vendre, Mariana, 15 ans, in 2010 (OH! Editions, France).

== Humanitarian work ==
As part of a diploma in psychology, Matei worked with homeless children in Australia. In 1998, Matei and her son returned to Pitești and began working on behalf of homeless children.

In 1999, Matei was asked by police to bring some clothes for prostitutes they had arrested. Matei brought food and clothes for the girls, only to realize they were all underage and forced to be prostitutes. Matei became angry as the police officers refused to acknowledge that three girls were under-age victims of human trafficking.

Matei set up the charity Reaching Out Romania to end sex slavery, and opened a shelter, "The House of Treasure".
