= Frederick Bergendahl =

- Born: February 26, 1858; Gothenburg, Sweden
- Died: December 15, 1889 (aged 31)
- Burial place: Gothenburg, Sweden
- Military career
- Allegiance: United States of America
- Branch: United States Army
- Service years: 1875
- Rank: Private
- Conflicts: Indian Wars
- Awards: Medal of Honor

Frederick Bergendahl (February 26, 1858 – December 15, 1889) was a United States Army private who served in the American Indian Wars and received the Medal of Honor.

== Biography ==
He and fellow Private John Francis O'Sullivan distinguished themselves in this battle, and after nearly all the renegades had been killed, O'Sullivan pursued the last surviving Indian but was unable to catch him. Both Bergendahl and O'Sullivan received the Medal of Honor, as well as Lieutenant Lewis Warrington, for gallantry at the Staked Plains on October 13, 1875. Bergendahl was born and buried in Gothenburg, Sweden.

== Medal of Honor citation ==
For gallantry in a long chase after Indians on 8 December 1874, while serving with the Band of the 4th U.S. Cavalry, in action at Staked Plains, Texas.
