= Nashi (Canadian charity) =

Canadian charity

- Type: INGO
- Purpose: To oppose human trafficking by raising awareness through education
- Location: Saskatoon, Saskatchewan, Canada
- Region served: Ukraine
- Official language: English
- President: Savelia Curniski
- Key people: Betty Lawrence
- Affiliations: Public Service Alliance of Canada
- Website: nashi.ca

Nashi (Ukrainian: Наші; Nashi; "Ours") is a Saskatoon, Saskatchewan, Canada-based organisation that opposes human trafficking by raising awareness through education. Savelia Curniski is the president of NASHI. The organisation has established a vocational school in Lviv, Ukraine, to teach girls and women carpentry, sewing, information processing, and cooking so they will not become trapped in Ukraine's human trafficking network. NASHI also founded the Maple Leaf Centre, a resource centre and shelter in Ukraine for young people who are at risk of being trafficked. In 2011, NASHI hosted the Saskatoon portion of the Canada Freedom Relay to raise awareness about human trafficking. The event lasted 45 minutes and raised funds for various programs that aid human trafficking victims. In 2012, NASHI organised the Youth Unchained conference in Saskatoon that presented approximately 900 youth with information about human trafficking. Betty Lawrence is one of the co-founders of NASHI. The organisation's activities are facilitated by volunteers.
