= Chab Dai =

Cambodia-based organization

- Formation: 2005; 21 years ago
- Founded at: Cambodia
- Type: NGO
- Purpose: Abolishing sexual abuse, human trafficking, and exploitation
- Headquarters: Cambodia
- Services: Coalition building, community prevention, advocacy, research
- Founder: Helen Sworn
- Executive Director: Christa Foster Crawford
- Website: www.chabdai.org

Chab Dai ("joining hands" in Khmer) is an organization founded in Cambodia in 2005 by Helen Sworn that focuses on abolishing sexual abuse, human trafficking, and exploitation. It aims to bring an end to trafficking and sexual exploitation through coalition building, community prevention, advocacy and research. While the organization was founded in Cambodia, Chab Dai also has additional offices in the United States, Canada and the United Kingdom. In August 2023, they joined other Anti-Trafficking Organizations in a statement about the factual inaccuracies of the movie Sound of Freedom (film)

== Helen Sworn ==
Sworn had a career in business administration before she attended bible college in the United Kingdom. She began actively opposing human trafficking in 1999. In 2005, she founded Chab Dai, a network of Christian organizations opposing human trafficking. She was interviewed in the 2011 human trafficking documentary film Nefarious: Merchant of Souls. Sworn stepped down as Executive Director in 2023.
