= Derek Ellerman =

American social entrepreneur

- Derek Ellerman testifying before Congress
- Education: Cognitive Neuroscience, Sc.B.
- Alma mater: Brown University
- Known for: Co-founder of Polaris Project
- Title: Member of the Board
- Awards: Ashoka Fellow; John Hope Award for Community Service

Derek Ellerman (born June 27, 1978) is an American social entrepreneur. He was a co-founder of Polaris Project, a Washington, D.C.-based nonprofit organization that combats human trafficking and modern slavery. In 2004, he was selected as a Fellow by Ashoka. Ellerman is the co-publisher of the intersectional feminist website Everyday Feminism.

== Educational background ==
Derek Ellerman attended Brown University, graduating in 2002, with a Bachelor of Science in Cognitive Neuroscience.

== Professional background ==
While an undergraduate student at Brown University, Ellerman established the Center for Police and Community (CPAC), an organization that addressed issues of police misconduct in Providence, Rhode Island. At CPAC, Ellerman served as the Executive Director and worked to support individual victims of police abuse. He assisted in successfully advocating for the creation of the first civilian review board for law enforcement in the state of Rhode Island.

In 2002, during his senior year at Brown, Ellerman co-founded Polaris Project with Katherine Chon after reading an article in a local paper about a fake massage business, the conditions of which were close to slavery. Located in the United States, Polaris Project works to address and combat all forms of human trafficking, while providing programs and services to help all victims throughout the country.
