= Stop Child Trafficking Now =

Organization opposed to child abuse

- Type: IGO
- Purpose: To combat the trafficking of children
- Official language: English
- Key people: Lynette Lewis
- Website: sctnow.org at the Wayback Machine (archived 2013-08-13)

Stop Child Trafficking Now (also called SCTNow) was a not-for-profit organization founded by Lynette Lewis, an author and public speaker. This nonprofit organization engaged in advocacy work in an attempt to bring an end to the trafficking of children. SCTNow targeted the demand for human trafficking, focusing on pedophiles, child abductions and child pornography. The group sought to have those who sexually abuse children prosecuted and convicted.

== Activities ==
The organization organized annual walks to raise funds and awareness about the issue. In 2009, organizers claimed to have organized walks in 41 cities nationwide and hoped to raise over a million dollars. The group organized a protest at Phillips Square, Montreal, Quebec, Canada in September 2009. The first walk took place in September 2011 in Augusta, Georgia, United States. SCTNow events have been held in more than 35 cities in the United States.

A focus of Stop Child Trafficking Now's fundraising campaigns was tapping donors to support an effort led by Clark Stuart, a former U.S. Navy SEAL described as the group's "operations president," for what Stuart described as an elite team made up of former American law enforcement officers and former U.S. military who would hunt down Americans who trafficked children for sex in foreign countries. According to individuals approached by Stuart to make donations, the culprits would be handed over to government authorities for prosecution abroad or in the U.S. Tulsa, Oklahoma, Police Chief Chuck Jordan agreed to accept the group's national database of information about child traffickers and child predators for its possible value in assessing child sex trafficking.

== Closure ==
The organization ceased to exist after questions were raised about fundraising improprieties.
