= 8th Day Center for Justice =

Catholic non-profit organization in Chicago, Illinois, U.S.

- Formation: 1974
- Dissolved: 2017
- Type: Sponsored center
- Legal status: Not for profit
- Location: Chicago, Illinois, U.S.
- Members: Over 30 religious congregations
- Website: 8thDayCenter.org (defunct)
- Remarks: Special consultative relationship with the Economic and Social Council of the United Nations

8th Day Center for Justice was a Roman Catholic non-profit organization based in Chicago, Illinois. Named after the Christian concept of an eighth day, it was founded in 1974 by six congregations of religious men and women. The center was advocacy-centered (primarily around Catholic social teaching) and was associated with over 40 religious communities, allowing the congregations to pool their resources for the work.

According to its mission statement, the center existed to promote "a world of right relationships in which all creation is seen as sacred and interconnected. In such a world all people are equal and free from oppression, have a right to a just distribution of resources, and to live in harmony with the cosmos."

The center and its staff sponsored weekly silent peace vigils beginning after 2001's September 11 attacks. It also hosted a radio show called The 8th Day on WLUW, Chicago. 8th Day Center was also involved in issues of homelessness, human trafficking, nuclear disarmament, labor rights, inclusive language, and LGBT rights.

8th Day Center for Justice had a special consultative relationship with the Economic and Social Council of the United Nations. In April 2010, the center was named a Human Rights Champion by the Chicago Religious Leadership Network on Latin America.

8th Day Center for Justice closed in 2017.

== Member congregations ==
Sponsoring members of 8th Day Center for Justice included:

- Claretian Missionaries of the US Western Province
- Divine Word Missionaries of North America
- Sisters of Charity of the Blessed Virgin Mary
- Priests of the Sacred Heart
- Sisters of Providence of Saint Mary-of-the-Woods
- Sisters of St. Joseph of the Third Order of St. Francis
- Franciscan Sisters of Perpetual Adoration
- Poor Handmaids of Jesus Christ

These members helped to staff the center. Longstanding staff included Sister Kathleen Desautels. In addition, 34 other congregations served as member friends or contributing members.
