= Redlight Children Campaign =

American non-profit organization

The Redlight Children Campaign
- Company type: Non-profit organization
- Founded: 2002
- Headquarters: New York, New York
- Key people: Guy Jacobson, Adi Ezroni

The Redlight Children Campaign is a non-profit organization created by New York lawyer and president of Priority Films Guy Jacobson and Israeli actress Adi Ezroni in 2002, to combat worldwide child sexual exploitation and human trafficking. Its mission is to decrease the demand side of the international sex trade through legislation and enforcement while raising awareness utilizing mass media and grassroots outreach.

Through its partnership with Priority Films, Redlight Children has recently launched the K11 Project—three films which attempt to expose real life experiences of the underage sex trade. K11 consists of two documentaries and a feature-length narrative, Holly, which were all filmed on locations in Cambodia.

== History ==
The Redlight Children Campaign was inspired by Guy Jacobson's personal experiences backpacking in Cambodia in 2002. While traveling in Phnom Penh, a group of young girls, some only five years old, began to aggressively solicit him for prostitution. Although he refused several times, they revealed to him that they would be beaten by the brothel owners if they returned empty-handed. After Jacobson gave them some money and left, he was motivated to create Redlight Children.

Shortly thereafter, Jacobson decided to utilize mass media as a vehicle for social change through his film production company, Priority Films. He teamed up with Israeli actress Adi Ezroni to create the first phase of the Redlight Children Campaign, the K11 Project. They went undercover in Cambodian brothels using espionage equipment and secret cameras to research the plight of child trafficking victims.

At one point, the International Criminal Police Organization (Interpol) contacted Jacobson to warn him to flee the country because the Chinese, Vietnamese, and Cambodian mafia had hits taken out on his life. Jacobson, Ezroni, and their team of filmmakers were also blackmailed and extorted for money, one of the producers was held hostage for two weeks when the rest of the team had left, and they had to hire bodyguards to protect themselves and their research.

Jacobson's and Ezroni's work on the ground level provided the education and foundation for them to address the issue on a larger scale. After they established RedLight Children, they created a comprehensive legal manifesto of action items to decrease the demand of child sexual exploitation with the aid of a team of international lawyers.

Jacobson and Ezroni have also been honored as Global Heroes by Condoleezza Rice in the Trafficking in Persons Report 2008.

== Manifesto ==
The Redlight Children Campaign ultimately aims to globally decrease demand for child sex trafficking and the sexual exploitation of children by pressuring governments to enact or amend legislation to address the issue more effectively and allocate more resources towards enforcement of laws.

The Redlight Children Campaign's main goals are to make it more difficult and costly for perpetrators to sexually abuse children, increase the likelihood of catching perpetrators, and make prosecution faster, easier, and more efficient. The Redlight Children Campaign Manifesto focuses on laws and enforcement efforts relating to Internet chat rooms, child pornography, sex tourism, and extraterritorial enforcement that it believes should be passed in every country in the world.

Currently, Redlight Children is partnering with LexisNexis to create an international case law database for trafficking and a trafficking offenders database to assist lawmakers and prosecutors. Amongst Board members of Redlight Children is Robert Rigby-Hall who was the recipient of the 2010 Business Leaders Award Against Human Trafficking (United Nations Global Initiative to Fight Human Trafficking)

== The K11 Project ==
The K11 Project consists of three films—Holly, The Virgin Harvest, and the K11 Journey—created by Priority Films and Redlight Children to expose the underage sex trade in Cambodia.

Holly is a feature-length narrative film written by Guy Jacobson. Filmed in Cambodia, it is based on the true stories of abducted children. It stars Ron Livingston, Virginie Ledoyan, Udo Kier, Chris Penn and Thuy Nguyen.

The Virgin Harvest, directed by Charles Kiselyak, is an undercover documentary taking place in Cambodian brothels. It follows three young girls—Reena, Sokha, and Sereum—as they are sold into brothels, abused, and finally rescued.

The K11 Journey is a documentary that follows the dangerous journey of the filmmakers as they make Holly. It exposes the corruption of the Cambodian government and police.

Holly was launched at the United Nations Headquarters in New York, and later shown with the US State Department in Washington, D.C., in order to establish a political presence for the Redlight Children Campaign. With the nationwide release of Holly on November 9, 2007, Jacobson conducted television, radio, magazine, and print coverage, including articles/interviews in Glamour, The New York Times, the LA Times, and CNN.

In addition to creating awareness, the film projects have helped local communities address trafficking. For example, AFISEP is featured as the shelter in Holly, and the Somaly Mam Foundation was featured at the UN. Jacobson organized the UN event/fundraiser for the Somaly Mam Foundation.
