= Slavery Footprint =

Survey that calculates one's consumption of modern-day-slavery items

Slavery Footprint is a survey that asks and responds to the question, “How Many Slaves Work For You?”. Users input data about their consumer spending habits, then the survey calculates the user's participation in modern-day slavery as quantified by their consumption of items created by forced labor and child labor.

The creators of Slavery Footprint researched the supply chains of 400 consumer products to determine the likely number of slaves it takes to make each of those products. The purpose of the survey is to increase awareness of forced labor and child labor and engage the public in taking steps toward addressing the use of forced labor, by encouraging users to advocate with strategic actions in the marketplace.
