= Freeset =

Group of social enterprises in West Bengal, India

- Established: 2001
- Location: India
- Website: https://joyya.com/

Freeset, now known as Joyya, is a group of social enterprises with the stated goal of creating employment opportunities for women affected by sex trafficking in West Bengal, India. In 2021, Joyya was awarded an A+ by Tearfund's Ethical Fashion Report.

Freeset was founded in 2001 by Kerry and Annie Hilton. It began by employing 20 local women from the Sonagacchi red-light district who were in Kolkata's sex trade, who produced jute bags for export. The name was changed to Joyya in 2021. The business has three parts: 'Joyya Goods', the business arm which offers employment and produces textile goods, 'Joyya Collective', the social arm which collaborates with a range of aligned businesses and NGOs, and 'Joyya Neighbours', the relational arm which focuses on participating in local community.

The Freeset name is still used by the Freeset Business Incubator, which is based in Kolkata, West Bengal. They have three focus areas: Vocational Training, Business Development and Job Preparation.

== Sources ==
- Cadacio, Jodeal (13/11/2009). "Freeing women from sex trade". North Shore Times.
- Chanwai-Earle, Lynda (July 20, 2015). "Freedom from Calcutta's sex slave trade - Freeset, India". Radio New Zealand National.
