= Awareness Against Human Trafficking (HAART) =

Kenyan non-governmental organization

- Abbreviation: HAART
- Formation: 2010
- Founder: Radoslaw Malinowski
- Type: Non-governmental organisation
- Purpose: Countering Human Trafficking
- Location: Nairobi, Kenya
- Fields: Disaster relief and development aid
- Director: Radoslaw Malinowski
- Chairperson: William Agola
- Website: haartkenya.org

Awareness Against Human Trafficking (HAART) is a non-governmental organization working on the problem of human trafficking in Kenya. It was founded in 2010.

== Overview ==
HAART works on five levels:

- Prevention of trafficking through awareness. HAART runs workshops on human trafficking to create awareness of human trafficking in Kenya Young@HAART is the youth program of HAART. The youths are trained on human trafficking and they also spread awareness to their communities.
- Protection of victims of human trafficking. The victims’ assistance team works with victims of human trafficking and based on the individual case HAART will try to provide assistance, which can be counseling, transport, training, economic empowerment, school fees, medical assistance, legal aid and rescue.
- Prosecution of trafficking offenders. HAART works with local authorities to arrest and prosecute traffickers.
- Policy and cooperation with other like-minded organizations. HAART works in partnership with other organizations and is part of networks such as the Mixed Migration Task Force, the Kenya Peace Network and COATNET. In addition HAART has partners in Poland—Razem Dla Afryki and Fundacja Usłyszeć Afrykę.
- Research on trafficking. Most notably, in 2015, HAART has published an extensive report on human trafficking of internally displaced persons (IDPs) in Kenya.

HAART has also incorporated the arts in to its work against human trafficking. In 2013, some of the youths in the youth program were trained to become professional photographers by Polish photographer Adam Balcerek. Since May 2015, HAART has increased its efforts to artistically create awareness on trafficking through the introduction of the Arts to End Slavery (A2ES) project. A2ES is a program that engages artists in a bid to abstractly conceptualize the experiences of survivors of human trafficking via audio, visual as well as audio-visual media, in order to make the issue comprehensible for a wider target audience.

== See also ==
- Human Trafficking
- Human trafficking in Kenya
- Trafficking in Persons Report
