= Anna Amalia Bergendahl =

Dutch poet, writer and philanthropist

- Born: Anna Amalia Bergendahl; 24 July 1827; Amsterdam
- Died: 20 May 1899 (aged 71); Amsterdam
- Occupation(s): abolitionist, author, poet, publisher
- Spouse: none
- Children: none

Anna Amalia Bergendahl (1827–1899) was a Dutch prose author, poet, publisher, philanthropist and abolitionist. She played a significant part in the Dutch Abolitionist movement, known for her public campaign and funding for the issue at the time of the abolition of slavery in the Dutch colonial empire.

== Life ==
Bergendahl was born to the wealthy official Christian Kroppelin Bergendahl (1790–1871) and Anna Maria Dannenberg (1789–1857). She never married, and lived with her family in Amsterdam. She was informally well educated and attended the lectures of Isaäc da Costa.

Bergendahl was, from 1840 onward, actively engaged as a philanthropist in her parents' charity organization, Vereeniging Hulpbetoon (later known as Vereeniging tot Support van Hulpbetoonden). It was an organization founded by her parents to assist honest and law abiding poor people. She gradually expanded her philanthropic interest to assist former prostitutes and alcoholics.

Bergendahl started her writing career in order to contribute to her philanthropic engagement in order to collect money for her charities. She made her debut as an author in 1855. She debuted with a collection of poetry and prose in Souvenir, which was written to benefit the charity organization of her parents.

Inspired by the British Anti-Slavery Society, she founded in 1856 the Dutch abolitionist society 'Dames-Comité ter Bevordering van de Evangelieverkondiging en de Afschaffing der Slavernij' (Ladies Committee for the Promotion of the Proclamation of the Gospel and the Abolition of Slavery), an association for women with the purpose of the abolition of the slavery in Dutch Surinam, who she headed as chair person. The goal was reached in 1863.

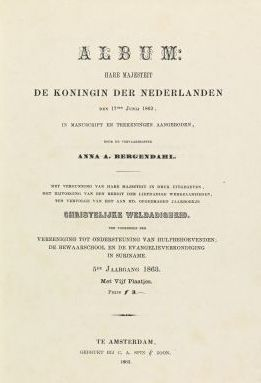
Anna Amalia Bergendahl: Album, Hare Majesteit de Koningin der Nederlanden den 17den Junij 1862, in manuscript en teekeningen aangeboden, 1863. Title page.

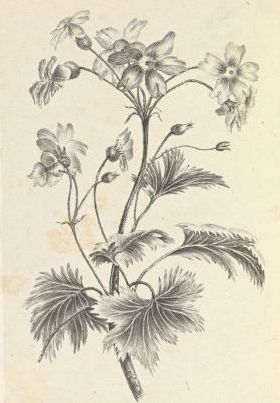
Anna Amalia Bergendahl: Botanical illustration, Album, 1863. Lithograph.

== Quote ==
Slavernij in al hare afschuwlijkheid [heeft op] mij een zóó diepen indruk achtergelaten, dat ik mij nu zeer verblijde van met eene welligt vreemd schijnende ijver, voor de Emancipatie te mogen werkzaam zijn.

—Anna Amalia Bergendahl 1859.

Slavery in all its horror [has] left such a deep impression on me that I am now very happy to be working for Emancipation with what may seem a strange zeal.

== Publications ==
Bergendahl's publications, all in Dutch, include:

- 1855: Souvenir, Uitgegeven ten voordeele der Vereeniging te Amsterdam: tot ondersteuning van hulpbehoevenden en hare bewaarscholen, Amsterdam, 1855. Prose and poetry by various authors.
  - 1857: Souvenir, expanded reprint
- 1859: Suriname, poem in Jaarboekje Christelijke Weldadigheid 1859, volume 1, 268. Also in Album (1863), 57–58.
- 1862: Een woord bij de aanstaande afschaffing der slavernij, 1862.
- 1863: Album. Hare Majesteit de Koningin der Nederlanden den 17den junij 1862, in manuscript en teekeningen aangeboden, door de vervaardigster. [...] Ten voordeele der Vereeniging tot Ondersteuning van Hulpbehoevenden, de bewaarschool en de evangelieverkondiging in Suriname, Amsterdam, 1863. This publication also was the fifth and final volume of the Jaarboekje Christelijke weldadigheid.
- 1864: Guldens Jaarboekje [One guilder Yearbooklet], 1864.
- 1867: Het proces van het geheim genootschap der thugs of verworgers in Engelsch Indien, voor het Hoog Gerechtshof van Calcutta en Madras, Amsterdam, 1867
- 1870: Jaarlijksch berigt van eenige liefdadige werkzaamheden, te Amsterdam, in Syrië, Palestina, Suriname, Oost-Indië en Zwitserland.
- 1877: Gelegenheids- en andere gedichten, 1877. Poetry.
- Editor:
  - Jaarboekje ‘Christelijke Weldadigheid’, volumes 1-4 (1859–1862)
