= Ing Makababaying Aksyon =

Filipino-based foundation

Ing Makababaying Aksyon (IMA) Foundation is located in Angeles City, Philippines. The name Ing Makababaying Aksyon is based on a Pampango term for mother, a fitting name for a feminist service institution that seeks to empower women and work for a society that genuinely recognises and upholds women's rights.

Ing Makababaying Aksyon (IMA), provides a shelter for women and children who are victims of abuse and the prostitution trade in Angeles City.

In 2005, More than 200 representatives attended a family planning summit organized by the Ing Makababaying Aksyon Foundation and supported by USAID.

== Accreditation of Non-governmental Organization ==
Ing Makababaying Aksyon (IMA) Foundation has received accreditation as a non-governmental organizations by members of the preparatory committee of the special session, in accordance with the procedure laid down in United Nations General Assembly decision 54/467.

== Background ==
It provides services that aims to empower, develop and advocate for self-reliance and strengthen the self-determination of women's organisations, groups and individuals to address certain economic political and socio-cultural structures that cause women's vulnerability to exploitation, oppression and subordination.

== Actions ==
In 2003, the Ing Makababaying Aksyon (IMA) Foundation led by its Executive Director Susan Pineda, in coordination with the Women's Legal Bureau (WLB) in Manila and elements of the Philippine Center on Transnational Crimes (PCTC) rescued 31 children held captive by illegal recruiters. In 2009, the Ing Makababaying Aksyon Foundation along with other NGO's took part in a "Freedom March" in Angeles to show their strength, unity and commitment to fight human trafficking.

== See also ==
- Charities in the Philippines
