= Reaching Out Romania =

Romanian non-governmental organization

- Abbreviation: ROR
- Formation: 1999
- Type: NGO
- Purpose: To rescue and rehabilitate Eastern European sex trafficking victims
- Headquarters: Pitești
- Location: Romania
- Region served: Europe
- Official language: Romanian
- Director: Iana Matei
- Website: www.reachingout.ro

Reaching Out Romania (also simply called Reaching Out, abbreviated ROR) is a non-governmental charitable organization in Romania that helps girls ages 13 to 22 exit the sex industry. ROR rescues these girls from the Moldovan and Romanian mafia, which have normally trafficked the girls out of Romania and into Western Europe. ROR runs a facility in Pitești that offers life skills-based education to these girls, teaching them to do things such as painting and sewing. This safe house hides the girls from their traffickers. A psychologist is on staff to meet with the girls. The organization was founded in 1999 by Iana Matei, who was named European of the Year in 2010 by Reader's Digest.
