= 3Strands Global Foundation =

Non-profit organization in California, US

- Formation: 2010; 16 years ago
- Location: Sacramento, California, United States
- CEO: Ashlie Bryant
- Staff: 40–50
- Website: www.3sgf.org

3Strands Global Foundation is a U.S.-based 501(c) non-profit organization headquartered in Sacramento, California, working globally to prevent exploitation and human trafficking. The agency's vision is “... A World FREE from human trafficking." Annually, 3SGF releases an impact report detailing their contributions to human trafficking prevention. In January 2024, 3SGF opened "The Table," an empowerment and resource center for victims of human trafficking.

== History ==
3Strands Global Foundation (3SGF) was founded in 2010 by CEO Ashlie Bryant, Vicki Mead, Stephanie Loos, and Amy Johnson. Called the “Run For Courage” until 2015, the non-profit was led by community members affected by a close friend's daughter who was trafficked and recovered. Because of that experience and the learning that came with it, the organization started as “The Race to End Human Trafficking,” a run to raise awareness of human trafficking and to fund nonprofits providing prevention and direct services to victims of human trafficking. The organization, now 3Strands Global Foundation, gained 501(c) status in 2011 and saw a need to develop prevention programs soon after. The organization works nationally across the 50 United States. 3SGF has offices throughout California, Utah, Texas, Oregon, and Ohio.

Prior to founding 3SGF, Ashlie Bryant, CEO, worked as a marketing executive for start-up companies in Silicon Valley. Her entrepreneurial background and passion for prevention have had her featured on ABC News, CNN Freedom Project, and Fox News.

3Strands Global Foundation became a strong supporter of prevention legislation by championing of California’s AB1227, The Human Trafficking Prevention Education and Training Act. This Act, which mandated human trafficking training for educator staff and students in middle school and high school was signed by Governor Brown in 2017 and became law in 2018.

== Initiatives ==
Prevention has been a component of the Trafficking Victims Protection Act, however, 3Strands Global Foundation has 3 anti-trafficking initiatives: Education, Employment, and Engagement. 3SGF believes prevention changes everything and has seven prevention programs that deliver on the mission. 3SGF hosts yearly events to raise awareness and funds for human trafficking prevention initiatives and engage people in the anti-trafficking movement.

=== Education ===
The flagship educational program PROTECT, is a national prevention education program that trains school staff and community members on recognizing and responding to human trafficking in students and youth. It also includes aspects of trauma-informed care, building safe spaces, and reporting protocols. The PROTECT program has curricula for K-12th grade students that teach them about healthy relationships, boundaries, trusted adults, and ways to protect themselves from exploitation. Along with the PROTECT program, 3SGF offers a parent and community prevention program that can accompany the school-based education program.

TATE, Telecommunications Against Trafficking & Exploitation, is a national education for Telecom professionals who are RAN certified upon completion. This means they can recognize and notify the appropriate resources if they witness exploitation, human trafficking, or abuse.

TRUE, Trauma Response and Understanding for Employers, is an education program for corporations and their employees. TRUE aims to understand trauma and its impact on mental, emotional, social, and professional health. The program evaluates the best methods and practices in supporting an individual experiencing crisis or trauma.

BRAVE, Best Practices, Responses, and Approaches for Victims of Exploitation is a comprehensive and interactive training for victim advocates to deliver services to survivors of human trafficking and others in vulnerable circumstances. BRAVE is designed to equip care providers with tools and resources to serve survivors in a trauma-informed manner and increase confidence in victim advocates as they work alongside their clients.

JJPYD, Juvenile Justice Positive Youth Development Training is for individuals within the Juvenile Justice Department to provide more positive, outcome-driven experiences with youth who are in the juvenile justice system. It is an approach to working with youth that emphasizes identifying and building on youths' strengths and providing support and opportunities that will help them achieve goals and transition to adulthood in a productive, healthy manner.

=== Employment ===
The Employ + Empower (E+E) program provides intensive case management services to survivors of human trafficking and those at risk of exploitation to break down barriers to employment and education. Case management services include providing resources to meet basic needs, assessment, service plan implementation, case coordination and collaboration, service navigation, advocacy, and direct delivery of resources and services. Clients also receive education on financial literacy skills, career goal setting, promotion of job readiness, connection to job training and academic resources, and job placement and retention services.

=== Engagement ===
3SGF has been working on advocacy since its inception. 3SGF has co-sponsored and endorsed several local and federal bills. In California AB 1227, The Human Trafficking Prevention Education and Training Act was signed into law in 2017. This bill mandates prevention education in California schools.

In the state of Utah, 3SGF supported SB 198, which was the Human Trafficking Prevention training bill. This was signed into law in 2019. In Florida, 3Strands Global Foundation worked with the Florida Fire Marshals and Fire Inspectors on HB 615, which directed the Statewide Council on Human Trafficking to develop human trafficking training for fire safety inspectors. This training provides information on how to identify children at risk, and the steps that should be taken, to prevent children from becoming victims of human trafficking. This bill was signed by the Governor in 2022.

Recently 3SGF has supported SB14, which would make the trafficking of minors a serious felony in California. Traffickers of minors would be subject to the Three-strikes law. The bill hopes to enforce greater accountability for child traffickers while strengthening the protection of sex trafficking victims.

Federally, 3SGF has participated in the endorsement of the reauthorization of the Trafficking Victims Protection Act. 3SGF worked with Representative Chris Smith’s office on the Frederick Douglass Trafficking Victims Prevention and Protection Reauthorization Act of 2018 and Smith’s office again in 2022 on HR 6522, The Trafficking Victim Protection Reauthorization Act. The recent reauthorization will continue to focus on ending human trafficking by implementing anti-trafficking programs and initiatives across the country and the globe.

== Financial affairs and financial reports (Financial information) ==
According to the organization's most recent publicly available IRS Form 990 filing for fiscal year 2024, 3Strands Global Foundation reported approximately US$4.08 million in revenue and US$4.09 million in expenses, with net assets of about US$1.04 million at the end of the fiscal year. The majority of its revenue was derived from program services and charitable contributions...

== The Table Center ==
In January 2024, 3Strands Global Foundation opened The Table, a resource and empowerment center in Sacramento designed to provide services for survivors of human trafficking. The center offers case management, employment support, educational resources, and community-based assistance intended to promote long-term recovery and independence.

== Organizational reach ==
The organization delivers prevention education through partnerships with schools, community organizations, businesses, and government agencies across the United States, while also supporting international anti-trafficking initiatives through educational and collaborative programs.

== Board members ==
- Ami Carpenter
- Ashlie Bryant
- Cynthia Schultz
- Gamil Cain
- Greg Norton
- Jane Einhorn
- Jennifer Randlett Madden
- Julie Bolton
- Lisa Cohen
- Lisa Thee
- Paul Doscher
- Ryan Fuselier
- Sherrod Patching
- Shelley Wetton
