= Face to Face Bulgaria =

Bulgarian organization against human trafficking

Face to Face Bulgaria was founded by former Miss Bulgaria Universe winner Magdalina Valchanova in 2002. While technically separate from Face to Face International, which was founded by the United Nations, it remains in close contact. Face to Face Bulgaria's primary mission is to prevent cases of forced prostitution and human trafficking in Bulgaria. Their prime means of success is educating young girls, especially those who are particularly vulnerable to predatory pimps, such as orphans and other girls without marketable skills.

Possibly the most visible effort of Face to Face Bulgaria's educational efforts is Svetlana's Journey, a 40-minute movie based on the true story of a young Bulgarian girl sold into prostitution in Amsterdam, which won two awards at the HDFEST in Los Angeles. The movie was preceded by the campaign "Love is dangerous", for which Bulgarian singer Maria Belosava has become a spokesperson. Face to Face also founded First Chance, a project that aims to provide life skills and knowledge to children in order to make them more competitive on the labor market and self-reliant in their future lives.
