= Global Centurion =

Non-profit organization

Global Centurion is a non-profit organization that works to combat modern slavery by focusing on demand. To date, efforts to combat human trafficking have focused on rescue and restoration of victims, and prosecution of traffickers. Few efforts focus on the buyers – those that fuel the market for human trafficking – whether its sex, labor or organ trafficking. Global Centurion believes that in order to combat human trafficking, a comprehensive approach is required, one that recognizes the "slavery triangle:" the supply (victims), demand ("buyers"), and distribution (traffickers). Global Centurion addresses the demand side in three ways: 1) Research on demand reduction and related issues; 2) training and awareness programs targeting demand; and 3) partnerships and collaboration. A key project is the creation of an international modern slavery case law database, with over 6,000 cases from around the world.

== History ==
From the 1970s until today, founder and president Laura Lederer has dedicated her life to combatting human trafficking. She has served as a senior advisor to the U.S. Secretary of State, subject matter expert to the U.S. Department of Defense, and adviser to Congressional Sub-Committees. Over the course of her work, she noticed that there were many organizations focused on services for victims and education of law enforcement and prosecutors, but there were no organizations focused on combatting demand. After leaving the U.S. Department of State in 2009, Lederer worked to build Global Centurion, the first organization to focus solely on eliminating demand.

== Projects and research ==
=== International Modern Slavery Case Law Database ===
Global Centurion is currently conducting a global comparative legal research project to examine case law from 1995 to the present. The goal is to establish a baseline of information on the nature and scope of the demand in human trafficking. The study covers the full range of human trafficking-related issues, including labor trafficking, sex trafficking, child sex tourism, commercial sexual exploitation of children, and other related issues. Data for the study is drawn from a combination of publicly accessible case law records, periodicals, and covers investigations, arrests, prosecutions and/or convictions of human trafficking cases brought by local, state (or provincial), federal, and international law enforcement authorities around the world.

=== Demand-Reduction Programs ===
Global Centurion runs a demand-reduction program that focuses on the Five S’s. The Five S’s stand for sanctioning soliciting, second chance schools, sting and reverse sting operations, social marketing campaigns, and standards. "The Five S’s program encourages law enforcement, politicians and johns to engage in the public discourse about the harmful effects of human trafficking."

=== Mapping Hubs of Demand ===
Global Centurion has created a set of maps identifying major hubs of demand for sex trafficking and labor trafficking around the world. The purpose of these maps is to assist in understanding what drives the trade in human beings worldwide. Most current information on human trafficking focuses on the victims, including the number of victims, their age, their nationality, and the harms they have suffered. These maps focus for the first time on the end buyer/user/exploiter and provide viewers with a global look at the various types of demand.

=== Demand Reduction Training: Department of Defense Training Programs ===
Global Centurion and its President, Laura Lederer, are serving as Subject Matter Expert (SME) for the U.S. Department of Defense Combating Trafficking in Persons (CTIP) Office. The organization has worked on four in-depth online training programs for Department of Defense personnel. The first was a General Awareness Training required for all servicemen and women. It provides basic information on trafficking in persons, and teaches Department of Defense personnel how to understand the root causes of human trafficking; identify vulnerable populations; initiate appropriate responses to trafficking in persons cases; and establish response protocols to trafficking in persons allegations. Additional projects include specialized trainings for Acquisition and Procuration Workforce to combat trafficking in government contracting; training for Military Law Enforcement to assist in investigations, chain of evidence, interview techniques for trafficking victims, and more; Leadership Training for Commanders and other leaders in Department of Defense, and a Refresher Course for personnel who have already taken the General Awareness Course.

=== Street Gangs and Human Trafficking ===
Global Centurion analyzed case law to prove a link between criminal gangs (street gang, prison gang, and motorcycle gang). Using variables collected from the case law, Global Centurion conducted a comparative analysis of recruitment methods, methods of coercion and control, marketing and sales techniques, of the traffickers as well as information about the victims, including age, geographic origin, gender, race, and other pertinent information. Using this data, the organization examined anti-gang and anti-trafficking law and policy and drew up a set of recommendations for government officials, policy-makers, community leaders and educators. "Typically gang members are charged with a Class A felony, such as murder, extortion, drug trafficking, and weapons trafficking, while trafficking in persons goes uncharged." The study recommends adding "pimping, pandering, and human trafficking to the list of gang crimes recognized in state law." The work influenced members of Congress, as well as state and legislators, resulting in new laws addressing the link between street gangs and sex trafficking.

=== Organized Crime and Human Trafficking ===
Global Centurion worked on a U.S. Department of Justice funded contract, in collaboration with Texas Christian University, to help establish evidence of a link between organized crime and trafficking in persons. Global Centurion utilized case law from completed human trafficking prosecutions in the U.S. (1995 to 2015) to make the link between organized crime and human trafficking. Global Centurion used the FBI categories of organized criminal networks, including African Criminal Enterprises, Asian Criminal Enterprises, Balkan Criminal Enterprises, Eurasian Criminal Enterprises, Italian Organized Crime/Mafia, and Middle Eastern Criminal Enterprises to classify the types of organized criminal activity involved in trafficking in persons. In addition, Global Centurion used new classifications suggested by experts to identify traffickers as highly sophisticated international criminal enterprises such as cartels or syndicates; corporate/private businesses; crime families; brothel/business front such as massage parlors; criminal gangs; and "crime couple plus one." These categories aid in analyzing the data and creating crime, perpetrator, and victim profiles. The full report will be released in 2016.

=== Health and Human Trafficking ===
In an effort to understand the health effects of sex trafficking, Global Centurion interviewed over 100 domestic survivors of sex trafficking from across the United States. The study provides the first solid evidence that women and children who are trafficked into prostitution are physically, mentally, and emotionally devastated by the crime, and this devastation is lasting – with illnesses, injuries, and impairments continuing often for decades. The study was the basis of several briefings and a formal hearing in Congress and resulted in the creation of the Title VII of the Justice for Victims of Trafficking Act of 2015 (JVTA) "Title VII [Trafficking Awareness Training for Health Care]. The law "was inspired by a groundbreaking study conducted by Laura Lederer and funded by several foundations, including the Charlotte Lozier Institute," and "found that approximately 88 percent of domestic trafficking victims had contact with a health care provider while being trafficked, with the most common being a hospital or a hospital emergency room, almost 64 percent."
