= Arizona League to End Regional Trafficking =

U.S. organization

The Arizona League to End Regional Trafficking (ALERT) is a coalition representing partnerships with law enforcement, faith-based communities, non-profit organizations, social service agencies, attorneys and concerned citizens. ALERT helps victims of human trafficking by providing: food and shelter; medical care; mental health counseling; immigration assistance; legal assistance; language interpretation; case management; and other culturally appropriate services throughout the state of Arizona. Through education, outreach and a variety of programs and services, ALERT strives to end the suffering and dehumanization of victims of human trafficking.

Human trafficking is almost modern-day slavery. It is the act of subjecting a person to involuntary servitude, peonage, debt bondage or slavery, for labor or commercial sexual services, through the use of force, fraud or coercion. Trafficking victims are enslaved in situations that are abusive, exploitative, inhumane, and illegal. They are primarily economically disadvantaged men, women and children from all over the world. They are forced to work in the sex industry or in labor such as domestic servitude, manufacturing, construction, agricultural work, hotels, restaurants, nail salons, etc.

ALERT was created in February 2003 through a grant awarded by the US Department of Justice / Office for Victims of Crime (OVC).

== History ==
In 2005, following funding from the U.S. Department of Justice's Office for Victims of Crime and the Bureau of Justice Assistance, ALERT became part of a regional anti-human trafficking task force established through collaboration among the International Rescue Committee, the Phoenix Police Department, and the United States Attorney's Office for the District of Arizona. In 2017, the regional task force evolved into the Central Arizona United to Stop Exploitation (CAUSE) Task Force, while ALERT continued as a statewide coalition supporting anti-trafficking efforts.

== Objectives ==
- Provide direct services to aid and support victims of trafficking.
- Seek to educate the public about human trafficking and train various communities in victim identification.
- To establish a regional network throughout Arizona and expand the anti-trafficking initiative.

== Common Forms of Trafficking ==
- SEX TRAFFICKING: The most well-known form of human trafficking is sex trafficking, in which primarily women and children are trafficked, often unwittingly, and sometimes in large numbers, to work in the sex industry. Victims may be confined and abused by their traffickers. The United Nations reports that the U.S. is one of the top three destination countries to which such people are trafficked. International trends show that in industrialized countries (U.S., Europe, Japan), forced labor for commercial sexual exploitation is the predominant form of trafficking.
- AGRICULTURAL WORK: Trafficking of migrant agricultural workers is prevalent in the United States. The illegal status of workers is exploited by their employers by forcing them to work in sub-standard conditions for pay below minimum wage. Cases involving hundreds of victims have been prosecuted in California, Florida, and upstate New York. Nearly all of the victims were trafficked into the U.S. across the Arizona-Mexico border.
- DOMESTIC SERVICE: The Human Rights Center at Berkeley reports that the second highest incidence of forced labor in the U.S. takes place in domestic service. Victims are found virtually or literally imprisoned in their employer's house, to be forced to work long hours under abusive conditions. U.S. citizens and foreign nationals residing in the U.S. bring in thousands of domestic workers into the U.S. annually and many of them suffer abuse. This type of trafficking is characterized by the demand for cheap household help, the lack of legal protections for domestic servants, and the absence of monitoring of work conditions.
- SWEATSHOPS: Forced labor under sweatshop-type conditions has been found in the United States and within US territories (such as Guam and American Samoa). Several large cases have been found in New York City and Los Angeles because they are natural concentrations of the U.S. garment and textile industry. Lack of workplace inspections or enforcement of labor laws, combined with the context of coercion and fear, create an environment for forced labor.

== Legislation ==
As awareness levels of human trafficking increase, there is more legislation that offers assistance to victims as well as new federal crimes against traffickers.

- Victims of Trafficking and Violence Protection Act of 2000 (US) – This is the most comprehensive U.S. law, to date, addressing human trafficking. Amongst other things, the law allows victims to apply for T visas, which allow for three-year temporary stays which can lead to permanent residency status.
- Trafficking Victims Protection Reauthorization Acts of 2003, 2005, and 2008 (US) – These Acts enhanced protections for victims of trafficking, some of whom faced “unintended obstacles” in being able to legally remain in the U.S., and instituted revisions and additions to the prevention of trafficking and prosecution of traffickers.
- Unlawfully Obtaining Labor or Services; classification (AZ) - Arizona Legislation making it illegal to obtain labor or services through the use of bodily harm, threatening or restraining victim, and/or withholding victim's personal records.
- Sex Trafficking; classification (AZ) - Arizona Legislation that defines what sex trafficking is. States that it is illegal to recruit, entice, harbor, transport, provide or obtain by any means another person with the intent of causing the other person to engage in prostitution by force, fraud or coercion. If a person is under the age of eighteen, it is illegal to entice, harbor, transport, provide, or obtain by any means that person with the intent of causing that person to engage in prostitution.
- Trafficking of Persons for Forced Labor or Services; classifications; definitions (AZ) - Arizona Legislation that defines labor trafficking as "transport another person or to entice, recruit, harbor, provide or otherwise obtain another person for transport by deception, coercion or force". Also states that it is illegal to knowingly traffic another person or benefit from the trafficking of another person for labor or services.

== Legacy ==
ALERT is recognized as one of several organizations and regional partnerships contributing to Arizona's statewide anti-human trafficking response, alongside regional task forces coordinated through the Governor's Council to Combat Human Trafficking.

== Evolution ==
In 2005, the International Rescue Committee (IRC), the Phoenix Police Department, and the United States Attorney's Office for the District of Arizona received funding from the U.S. Department of Justice's Office for Victims of Crime (OVC) and the Bureau of Justice Assistance to establish a multidisciplinary anti-human trafficking task force in Maricopa County. The initiative expanded the work of the Arizona League to End Regional Trafficking (ALERT) by strengthening cooperation between victim service providers and law enforcement agencies. In 2017, the initiative evolved into the Central Arizona United to Stop Exploitation (CAUSE) Task Force, while ALERT continued providing victim services through the IRC's anti-trafficking program.

== See also ==
- Human trafficking
