= Shared Hope International =

U.S. nonprofit organization

- Formation: 1998; 28 years ago
- Type: Non-profit
- Purpose: Prevent, restore and bring justice to victims of sex trafficking in the U.S. and around the world.
- Location(s): Vancouver, Washington, U.S. Arlington, Virginia, U.S.
- Founder: Linda Smith
- Website: sharedhope.org

Shared Hope International (SHI) is a non-profit, non-governmental, Christian organization that exists to prevent sex trafficking and slavery.

== History ==
Shared Hope International was founded in 1998 by former Congresswoman Linda Smith, whose visit to a brothel district in Mumbai inspired her to address human trafficking. SHI's early efforts were focused on international sex trafficking, but later work investigated sex trafficking issues within the U.S.

== Reports ==
SHI received a grant from the U.S. Department of State's Office to Monitor and Combat Trafficking in Persons, to conduct a comparative examination of sex trafficking in four countries: Japan, Jamaica, Netherlands and the United States. This work resulted in SHI's DEMAND report and documentary.

Follow-up research resulted in the publication of The National Report on Domestic Minor Sex Trafficking: America's Prostituted Children, which assessed the problems of child sex trafficking across ten locations in the United States.

== Programs ==
To build momentum in the international movement against trafficking, Linda Smith founded the War Against Trafficking Alliance (WATA) in January 2001. WATA coordinated regional and international efforts necessary to combat sex trafficking and conferences around the world. In February 2003, WATA co-sponsored its first World Summit with the U.S. Department of State which brought together leaders from 114 nations, all demonstrating a sustained commitment to prosecute trafficking and provide assistance to victims. In 2005, WATA was invited to participate, along with UNIFEM, in the first ASEAN conference to address child sex tourism in East and Southeast Asia.
