= Polaris Project =

U.S. nonprofit organization

- Formation: 2002; 24 years ago
- Founders: Derek Ellerman; Katherine Chon
- Type: NGO
- Purpose: Combat and prevent human trafficking
- Headquarters: Washington, D.C., U.S.
- Location: United States
- CEO: Megan Lundstrom
- Main organ: Board of Directors
- Website: Official website

Polaris is a 501(c)(3) nonprofit organization that works to combat and prevent sex and labor trafficking in North America. The organization's 10-year strategy is built around the understanding that human trafficking does not happen in vacuum but rather is the predictable end result of a range of other persistent injustices and inequities in our society and our economy. Knowing that, and leveraging data available from more than a dozen years operating the U.S. National Human Trafficking Hotline, Polaris is focused on three major areas of work: building power for migrant workers who are at risk of trafficking in U.S. agricultural and other industries; leveraging the reach and expertise of financial systems to disrupt trafficking, creating accountability for perpetrators of violence against people in the sex trade and expanding services and supports to vulnerable people to prevent trafficking before it happens.

Polaris operates the U.S. National Human Trafficking Hotline, which connects victims and survivors to supports and services around the country and takes tips and calls from people about suspected situations of human trafficking. From that work, the organization has built out one of the largest data sets on human trafficking in the United States. The data set is publicly available for use by researchers through the Counter-Trafficking Data Collaborative, launched by Polaris and UN International Organization for Migration. Polaris also advocates for stronger state and federal anti-trafficking legislation, and engages community members in local and national grassroots efforts. Critics of Polaris state that the organization fails to distinguish between consensual sex work and coercion, and that the policies Polaris lobbies for harm sex workers.

== History ==
Polaris - originally Polaris Project - was founded in 2002, by Derek Ellerman and Katherine Chon, who were seniors at Brown University. The organization was named after the North Star, an historical symbol of freedom. Polaris is one of the few organizations working on all forms of trafficking, including supporting survivors who are male, female, transgender people and children, US citizens and foreign nationals and survivors of both labor and sex trafficking.

== The National Human Trafficking Hotline ==
Since 2007, Polaris has operated the U.S. National Human Trafficking Hotline, which is funded by the U.S. Department of Health and Human Services (HHS), Administration for Children and Families and through non-governmental sources. The Trafficking Hotline provides survivors of human trafficking with support and a variety of options to get help and stay safe, and shares actionable tips as appropriate. Assistance through the Trafficking Hotline is available 24 hours a day, every day of the year. Victims, survivors and others can contact the Trafficking Hotline through phone text (233733), web form and online chat, in both English and Spanish. All contact with the Trafficking Hotline is confidential. The Trafficking Hotline also maintains a public referral directory organizations around participating countries that work on and may be able to assist victims, survivors and others wishing to get involved in the anti trafficking movement.

== Criticism ==
Polaris Project has been criticized by journalists, sex workers and some public health advocates. Reason magazine editor Elizabeth Nolan Brown referred to Polaris as "one of the biggest purveyors of bad statistics dressed up as 'human trafficking awareness'". Sex worker advocates have stated the human trafficking hotline operated by Polaris is not confidential, and that calls to the hotline are referred to police who then arrest adult sex workers. However, at least as of 2022, The National Human Trafficking Hotline is confidential, except in cases where a call is made about someone under 18 suspected of abuse, in which case reporting to law enforcement may be required by law. Others have criticized Polaris for providing no services to alleged victims.

The accuracy of Polaris’ data on human trafficking has been questioned by multiple sources. In 2011, Polaris was criticized for knowingly using false and misleading data to exaggerate the number of trafficked sex workers and understate their age of entry into sex work. Polaris later partnered with data analysis firm Palantir Technologies to improve the organization of data reported to the National Human Trafficking Resource Center and the accuracy of statistics released to the public. In 2015, Polaris was accused of using unreferenced and uncorroborated data to exaggerate the income and number of clients seen by street based and massage parlor based sex workers and the prevalence of "pimps".

== Honors and awards ==
- 2020 Ohtli Award
- Thomson Reuters Everyday Heroes Award
- 2017 Skoll Foundation Award for Social Entrepreneurship
- Google Global Impact Award
- Ashoka Innovators for the Public

== See also ==
- La Strada Program
- Global Alliance Against Traffic in Women
- Coalition to Abolish Slavery and Trafficking
