= Anti-Trafficking in Persons Act of 2003 =

The Anti-Trafficking in Persons Act of 2003, officially designated as Republic Act No. 9208, is a consolidation of Senate Bill No. 2444 and House Bill No. 4432. It was enacted and passed by Congress of the Philippines' Senate of the Philippines and House of Representatives of the Philippines (12th Congress of the Philippines, 2001–2004) assembled on May 12, 2003, and signed into law (List of Philippine laws) by President Gloria Macapagal Arroyo on May 26, 2003. It institutes policies to eliminate and punish human trafficking, especially women and children, establishing the necessary institutional mechanisms for the protection and support of trafficked persons. It aims "to promote human dignity, protect the people from any threat of violence and exploitation, and mitigate pressures for involuntary migration and servitude of persons, not only to support trafficked persons but more importantly, to ensure their recovery, rehabilitation and reintegration into the mainstream of society."

R.A. 9208 made the Philippines one of the few Asian countries in Asia that have enacted an anti-trafficking legislation. The law establishes an Inter-Agency Council Against Trafficking (IACAT), first chaired by Raul M. Gonzalez, and composed of government agencies, non-government organizations and other civic organizations for the effective formulation of a comprehensive and integrated program to prevent and suppress the trafficking in persons. The Development Action for Women Network (DAWN), PMRW member organization, and the National Commission on the Role of Filipino Women and the Coalition Against Trafficking in Women-Asia Pacific (CATW-AP) supported the successful passage of this law. This penal law was implemented by the issued "RULES AND REGULATIONS IMPLEMENTING REPUBLIC ACT NO 9208 – Anti-Trafficking Act," pursuant to the authority of IACAT under Sec. 29 of R.A. 9208.

== Background ==
"The Anti-Slavery Society Convention, 1840" by Benjamin Haydon (1841).

The elimination of slavery throughout the world was campaigned by early abolitionists, but it was not the objective of the earliest organised British movements. The Committee for the Abolition of the Slave Trade, which established the Society for the Abolition of the Slave Trade in Britain in 1787, campaigned for an end to the Transatlantic slave trade from Western Africa to the New World, which Britain dominated. Much later, the Anti-Slavery Society became the everyday name of 2 different British organizations.

The first was the 1823 Society for the Mitigation and Gradual Abolition of Slavery Throughout the British Dominions (Slavery Abolition Act 1833), and the second, the 1839 The British and Foreign Anti-Slavery Society – which is presently known as Anti-Slavery International.

In America, the United States federal government severely punishes human trafficking both within its borders and beyond, making it, a federal crime under Title 18 of the United States Code. Section 1584 makes it a crime to force a person to work against his will, whether the compulsion is effected by use of force, threat of force, threat of legal coercion or by "a climate of fear" (an environment wherein individuals believe they may be harmed by leaving or refusing to work); Section 1581 similarly makes it illegal to force a person to work through "debt servitude." Human trafficking as it relates to involuntary servitude and slavery is prohibited by the 13th Amendment. Federal laws on human trafficking are enforced by the United States Department of Justice Civil Rights Division, Criminal Section.

Human trafficking or trafficking in persons is a modern and new type of global slavery which deprives people of their rights and freedom. Southeast Asia is a source, transit and destination for men, women, and children trafficked internally and internationally for the purposes of sexual exploitation and forced labor.

The Vatican "Pontifical Council for the Pastoral Care of Migrants and Itinerant People "People on the Move" (N° 96 Suppl., December 2004) reported that: "Poverty, unemployment, underemployment, landless poor and armed conflict combine to deny many children and their families in rural areas in the Philippines a secure future. These areas include the Samar-Leyte region, Negros, Bicol, Cebu Province, and Mindanao, where unscrupulous recruitment agencies operate by using a combination of deception, false promises and cash incentives to win over the parents or the children directly. Groups are "subverting" the Internet to traffic women and children, and ease of travel has enabled pedophiles to move from one country to another. Mostly foreigners are the big investors in the Philippine sex industry. Child pornography brought in by tourists teach local children about the sex acts that can be done to the tourists. The children are used to sell souvenirs and trinkets along the beaches to the tourists, who then invite them to show them child porn videos and give them money to repeat the acts on them.

=== Related Laws ===
Human trafficking and the prostitution of children are significant legal and moral issues in the Philippines, due to control and power of organized crime syndicates. Enforcement of penal laws is, however, reported to be inconsistent.

R.A. 9208 is only one of the laws which give protection to workers, children, and women, inter alia. The Philippines has a long history of legislation aimed at protecting the rights and welfare of children. The 1974 Labor Code of the Philippines (Presidential Decree No. 442) set the minimum age of employment at 15 years and prohibited the employment of persons below 18 years of age in hazardous undertakings. Presidential Decree No. 603 (The Child and Youth Welfare Code) permits the employment of children aged 16 years and below only if they perform light work, which is not harmful to their safety, health or normal development, and which is not prejudicial to their studies. Strict rules and regulations were issued on their rates of pay, hours of work and other conditions of employment. An employment permit also has to be secured from the Department of Labor and Employment. The 1992 child protection law, Republic Act No. 7610 (Special Protection of Children against Abuse, Exploitation and Discrimination Act) provides protection of children against abuse, commercial sexual exploitation, trafficking, and employment in illicit activities. Republic Act No. 7658 (amending RA 7610) set minimum age of employment to 15 years, and 18 years and above for hazardous work. Republic Act 7160 (The Local Government Code of 1991) includes provisions for the proper development and welfare of children at the basic political level, the Barangay. It enjoins local officials to promote and support activities for the protection and total development of children, particularly those below seven years of age, and adopt measures to prevent and eradicate drug abuse, child abuse, and juvenile delinquency. Republic Act No. 9231 (19 December 2003 – An Act Providing for the Elimination of the WFCL and Affording Stronger Protection for the Working Child) – amends R.A. No. 7610 by embodying the State policy to provide special protection to children from all forms of abuse, neglect, cruelty, exploitation and discrimination, and conditions prejudicial to their development, including child labour and its worst forms. It also provides stiffer penalties for their commission. It spells out the WFCL, consistent with Convention No. 182; the hours of work of working children; and ownership, usage and administration of the working child's income. Further, it ensures working children's access to education and training, and immediate legal, medical and psychosocial services.

In September 1995, then President Fidel V. Ramos signed Executive Order No. 275 creating a special oversight committee for the special protection of children from all forms of neglect, abuse, cruelty, exploitation, discrimination and other conditions prejudicial to their development.

== Statistics ==
A 1997 ILO report placed the number of child victims of prostitution at 75,000 in the Philippines, with other estimates (ECPAT) reporting as many as 100,000. Recently, around 300,000 prostitutes were found in a range of entertainment establishments, such as karaoke bars, dirt poor cabarets, beach resorts, and health clubs. Child prostitution is on the rise, estimated by ECPAT.org to be about 100,000. The United Nations Children's Fund (UNICEF) reported about 60,000 to 100,000 children in the Philippines involved in prostitution. There was a high incidence of child prostitution in tourist areas, where undetermined number of children are forced into exploitative labor operations. According to a report by the Consortium Against Trafficking of Children and Women for Sexual Exploitation (Catch-Wise), the Philippines is the 4th country with the most number of prostituted children, and authorities identified increases in pedophiles travelling to the Philippines.

The Coalition Against Trafficking in Women – Asia Pacific (CATW-AP) quoting from Kyodo News, estimated that in 1998 there were 400,000 women working in prostitution in the Philippines. The International Labor Organization estimated that in 1993/94 there were nearly half a million prostitutes in the country. The Commission on Filipinos Overseas (CFO) recorded 959 Philippine human trafficking cases from 1992 to March 2001. The United Nations reported 9 million people enslaved in the global sex trade by powerful syndicates in human trafficking in 1999 (Coalition Against Trafficking in Women – Asia Pacific, CATW-AP). The Philippines was the first Southeast Asian country to legislate this tough statute against trafficking.

== Prosecution ==
R.A. 9208, specifically criminalizes trafficking for the purposes of exploitation. The punished overt acts include trafficking under the guise of arranged marriage, adoption, sex tourism, prostitution, pornography, or the recruitment of children into armed conflict. Trafficking of children is made a “qualified” offense, and higher penalties of life imprisonment and a fine of 2 million to 5 million pesos (US$36,085 to 90,212) are imposed. Use of services of trafficked persons is penalized by 15 years imprisonment and a fine of 500,000 to 1 million pesos. Additional penalties are provided for government employees offenders. Sec 10 (c) provides for the maximum penalty for qualified trafficking under Section 6: life imprisonment and a fine of not less than 2 million pesos (P2,000,000.00) but not more than 5 million pesos (P5,000,000.00).

As complementary legislation, slavery and forced labor are also punished under Articles 272 and 274, Revised Penal Code of the Philippines, and Republic Act No. 7610, the "Special Protection of Children Against Child Abuse, Exploitation and Discrimination Act." This law protects children under 18 years from all forms of abuse, cruelty, and exploitation and prohibits child prostitution and child trafficking.

The US report scored there was only 1 conviction under the 2003 anti-trafficking law during the reporting period, but the government made some improvement in arresting, prosecuting, and convicting traffickers. Penalties imposed for trafficking for commercial sexual exploitation are commensurate with those for rape. A Zamboanga City RTC sentenced a member of a trafficking syndicate to life imprisonment in March 2007 for having recruited 6 victims and peddled them to a brothel in Sandakan, Malaysia. The case was the 5th conviction under R.A. 9208 which resulted in a jail sentence. In 2006, the public prosecutors filed 60 new trafficking cases with the Department of Justice (Philippines), and more than 107 pending prosecutions of trafficking crime. The government appointed 17 DOJ anti-trafficking prosecutors, and 72 additional Fiscals in its regional offices.

In Northern Mindanao, however, the report of the Sub-Committee on Human Trafficking (SCHT) submitted to the executive committee of the Regional Law Enforcement Coordinating Council (RLECC), Region 10 states that lack of access to legal information, aid or protection tops the list of issues and problems in the implementation of Republic Act No. 9208.

== Results ==
=== Trafficking in Persons Report: PHILIPPINES (Tier 2) ===
On June 3, 2005, the United States Department of State- Office to Monitor and Combat Trafficking in Persons released its 2005 Trafficking in Persons Report which put the Philippines in Tier 2 Watch List Category. Countries included under the said category are those whose governments do not fully comply with the standards of the US Victims of Trafficking and Violence Protection Act of 2000, but are making significant efforts to bring themselves into compliance with those standards. The US report, said that:

"The Philippines is a source, transit, and destination country for men, women, and children trafficked for the purposes of sexual exploitation and forced labor. A significant number of Filipino men and women who migrate abroad for work are subjected to conditions of involuntary servitude in Saudi Arabia, Kuwait, the United Arab Emirates, Qatar, Bahrain, Malaysia, Hong Kong, Singapore, Japan, South Africa, North America, and Europe. Women and children are also trafficked within the Philippines, primarily from rural areas, such as the Visayas and Mindanao, to urban areas for forced labor as domestic workers, and factory workers, and in the drug trade, and for sexual exploitation. A smaller number of women are occasionally trafficked from the People's Republic of China (P.R.C.), South Korea, Japan, and Russia to the Philippines for sexual exploitation. The Government of the Philippines failed to fully comply with the minimum standards for the elimination of trafficking, but made significant efforts."

=== IACAT-DOJ Raul M. Gonzalez statement ===
On 6 June 2005 Department of Justice (Philippines) Secretary Raul M. Gonzalez issued the government's official statement on R.A. 9208 vis-a-vis the U.S. State Department Report. Gonzales reported that:

"The Philippine government instituted measures to implement Republic Act No. 9208, to wit: 1. Creation/Expansion of the Task Force on Trafficking in Persons in the Department composed of 14 prosecutors (not only 4 as indicated in the report) tasked to prosecute violations of RA 9208; 2. Issuance of a directive to all prosecutors nationwide through Department Circular No. 18 dated April 12, 2005, directing all Regional Prosecutors, Provincial and City Prosecutors and Their Assistants, State Prosecutors and Prosecution Attorneys to: 1) give preferential attention to trafficking cases and resolve such cases within the periods prescribed under the revised Rules on Criminal Procedure; 2) not to dismiss trafficking cases on the mere account of an Affidavit of Desistance executed by the victim/s or their parent or legal guardians; and 3) vigorously oppose and/or manifest strong objection to motions for dismissal despite the desistance of the victim/s or their parents or legal guardians. 3. Issuance of a directive to the Commissioner of Immigration to put a stop to escort services at the airport; and 4. Investigation and case build-up of alleged/reported trafficking cases through the Anti-Human Trafficking Division of the National Bureau of Investigation. The DOJ has received 65 complaints for alleged trafficking in persons violations for the period June 2003 – January 2005. Of these cases, 24 have been filed in court while 31 are pending preliminary investigation. These complaints involve 98 alleged traffickers/recruiters. Majority of these cases (35) were filed in Manila, Quezon City, Pasay and the National Prosecution Offices, while others were filed in Zamboanga (8), Cebu (4), Davao City (4), Olongapo City (3), Lapu-Lapu City (3), La Union (2), Bacolod City (2), Kabankalan City (2), and Tagbilaran City (2). The Inter-Agency Committee on Passport Irregularities reported that 69 persons were convicted for violation of the Passport Law for the period 2000–2004, while 20 persons were convicted for illegal recruitment activities for the same period.

Law enforcement action was likewise intensified to curb trafficking in persons. The NBI Anti-Human Trafficking Division (AHTRAD) reported that it was able to apprehend and charge 63 persons for violation of RA 9208 and currently investigating 22 other cases. In a recent case, the NBI-AHTRAD arrested five Korean nationals who were arrested while in the act of identifying, choosing ad interviewing would-be brides for Korean nationals from among the thirty-two women rescued. In another case early this year, thirty-eight (38) women were rescued in Malate who were recruited from Davao to work in Japan as entertainers. Upon arrival in Manila, they were, however, detained in a place and were not allowed to go out. They were intimidated and threatened if they try to escape. Four (4) suspects were arrested while nine (9) others remain at-large. In March this year, in a joint operation with the NBI, the police arrested seven, including 2 Australians, in Benguet for cyber pornography. In April this year, the NBI-AHTRAD rescued 34 women and children in two separate rescue operations in a health club Quezon City and a nightclub in Nueva Ecija. The Presidential Anti-Illegal Recruitment Task Force (PAIRTF) rescued some women and girls from two Dutch nationals who engaged women in cyber pornography. The Philippine National Police, for the period January 2004-to date, was able to rescue 122 victims of trafficking and arrested 42 persons. Sixteen (16) cases for violation of the Anti-Trafficking in Persons Law and other related laws were filed against the perpetrators.

From July 2004 to date, the PAIRTF reported that they have served 4,486 complainants for illegal recruitment and arrested 400 suspects and cases for illegal recruitment were filed against them. Of the 400, 171 suspects are currently under detention while 229 were released. Seventy five (75) cases were also filed against suspects who are still at-large. Twenty (20) of those arrested were foreign nationals: Australian (2); French (1); Japanese (7); Korean (3); Arab (2); Malaysian (1); Papua New Guinea (2); Singaporean (1); and Swiss (1). The IACAT has adopted the National Strategic Plan of Action Against Trafficking. A six-year plan of action, the StratPlan shall serve as the roadmap or blueprint of all actions against trafficking in persons. It covers plans and proposed initiatives for the prevention of trafficking, the protection and reintegration of trafficked persons and the investigation and prosecution of traffickers. Other government agencies, non-government organizations and other partners continuously undertake public information campaigns and capacity building activities for frontline service providers. We will intensify our campaign against trafficking in persons and bring the implementation of the anti-trafficking law at the local level, where trafficking begins and ends."

=== 2008 IACAT report ===
As of June 30, 2008, the IACAT Chairman reported that it secured the conviction of Ms. Nelia Ogalesco, bringing the total number of convictions to 11, under Republic Act 9208:

"In these 11 convictions, witnesses were vital to sentencing of the perpetrators. Most of the cases that remain unsolved or archived usually do not have witnesses to corroborate the evidence gathered against perpetrators. The international community praised the Philippines for its success in reducing the number of cases involving human rights violations (including the trafficking of women and children). In the recently released 2008 Trafficking in Persons Report, by the U.S. Department of State, the Philippines was removed from the watch list. (The country) was cited for making significant efforts in eliminating trafficking. However, government, through IACAT, cannot eliminate human trafficking without funding support. The Justice Department, since IACAT’s creation 5 years ago, repeatedly requested the Department of Budget and Management (DBM) for financial aid for our programs. These have been denied. We’ve asked for reconsideration. To date, we’re still awaiting the DBM response.... A big part of the little success that IACAT achieved was due to the funds provided by the different non-government organizations (NGOs). Despite the (financial crimp) IACAT produced a ‘Manual on Law Enforcement and Prosecution of Trafficking in Persons Cases.’ These were provided to prosecutors and other law enforcers to facilitate effective investigation and prosecution of trafficking... There is still so much to be done. Among these are a massive information campaign and strengthening of different government agencies involved in (curbing) human trafficking.”

== Confidentiality of proceedings ==
Republic Act No. 9208 (the Anti-Trafficking Law) provides for confidentiality of proceedings at any stage of the investigation, like similar enacted legislation, to wit: RA No. 9344 (the Juvenile Justice Law) mandates that all records and proceedings involving children in conflict with the law from initial contact until final disposition of the case shall be considered privileged and confidential. RA No. 9262 (the Anti-Violence Against Women Law) provides that all records pertaining to cases of violence against women and their children shall be confidential... and the right to privacy of the victim shall be respected. RA No. 8369 (the Family Court Act) provides for the confidentiality of all records of cases and the identity of the parties involved therein unless necessary and with court authority. Thus, the identity of a child victim of abuse, child witness, CIAC or a CICL shall not be disclosed whether directly or indirectly. No information that would lead to the identity of the child or any member of his family shall be published or broadcast. Photographs, images, or video coverages of the face or any distinguishing feature of a child victim of abuse, child witness, CIAC or a child in conflict with the law including his or her family members shall not be taken, published, or shown to the public in any manner. The use of sexualized images of children is considered a violation of the child's rights. The disclosure of any private or graphic detail of the case, including the medico-legal findings, in public, is strictly prohibited. It is absolutely prohibited to access, use or in any manner disseminate a child's case files or records.

Ricardo R. Blancaflor, acting chairman of the Inter-Agency Council Against Trafficking (IACAT), called for the amendment of the anti-trafficking law due to the increasing number of “sexually trafficked" Filipino women workers, most especially in Singapore. GABRIELA Representative Liza Maza reported that 400,000 migrants were being trafficked internally and another 800,000 externally. Blancaflor, however, cited 11 convictions and 3 more cases submitted for decision under the law. But Blancaflor noted the confidentiality clause, Section 7, R.A. 9208 for possible amendment, it, being a bar for full disclosure of facts.

== Protection ==
The Philippine government relied heavily on NGOs and international organizations to provide services to victims. Victims were encouraged to file civil cases against traffickers, and the former are not penalized for any crimes committed as a direct result of their being trafficked. The implementing rules and regulations of the 2003 anti-trafficking law outline identification and referral procedures. The government assisted victims by providing temporary residency status, relief from deportation, shelter, and access to legal, medical, and psychological services.

The Department of Social Welfare and Development established 42 temporary shelters for victims and 13 of these were supported by a non-profit charity organization. The government sent 8 social workers to Philippine diplomatic missions to provide psychosocial counseling to overseas Filipino workers in distress. The Philippine Ports Authority provided the building and facilities for halfway houses in Manila, Davao, Batangas, and Sorsogon, managed by an NGO; the Ports Authority, police, and the Coast Guard referred victims to the halfway houses. In March 2007, the Department of Labor and Employment opened the first reintegration center where returning overseas Filipino workers may seek services such as skills training, psycho-social counseling, and business development assistance.

This law saves and protects many women and children from and against prostitution, pornography, sexual exploitation, forced labor, slavery, involuntary servitude or debt bondage, both domestic and overseas. R. A. Sec. 4b of 9208 supplements the Anti Mail-order bride law which only prohibits matching of Filipino women for marriage to foreign nationals on a mail-order bride formula, for this law punishes "introducing or matching any Filipino woman to a foreign national for marriage for the purpose of acquiring, buying, offering, selling, or trading her to engage in prostitution, pornography, sexual exploitation, forced labor, slavery, involuntary servitude or debt bondage is also considered an act of trafficking."

RA 9208 directs the Department of Foreign Affairs (DFA), the Department of Labor and Employment (DOLE), and the Philippine Overseas Employment Administration (POEA) to establish programs for Filipinos who are trafficked overseas, to ensure the safety of overseas Filipinos. This law covers both national and international migration, and requires the Department of Social Welfare and Development (DSWD), Department of Justice (DOJ), Bureau of Immigration (BI), Philippine National Police, Department of Interior and Local Government (DILG), NCRFW, and local government units (LGUs), to establish programs to prevent, protect, and rehabilitate trafficked victims.

== Legal gaps, hiatus and amendment of the law ==
Department of Social Welfare and Development Secretary Esperanza Cabral, Co-chair of the Inter-Agency Council Against Trafficking Forum stated on October 19, 2008, that "while Republic Act No. 9208 prohibits the recruitment or abduction of people for the purpose of selling their organs, an IRR specifically dealing with organ trafficking would 'address the apparent gaps in the law and existing policies' on the ‘donation’ of organs by a living non-related donor. The 1991 World Health Organization Guiding Principles on Human Organ Transplantation will limit the terms of the proposed Implementing Rules and Regulations."

=== Prevention ===
In 2007, the government's Interagency Council Against Trafficking established its first Ninoy Aquino International Airport anti-trafficking task force. In 2006 the Philippine Overseas Employment Agency (POEA) increased the minimum monthly wage from $ 200 to $ 400 and raised the minimum age from 18 to 23, and it required prospective domestic workers to get a certificate of competency from the Technical Education and Skills Development Authority and the Overseas Workers' Welfare Administration. In 2006, POEA conducted 1,000 pre-employment orientation seminars for more than 60,000 departing overseas Filipino workers. The Task Force Against Illegal Recruitment was created to develop strategies against illegal recruitment activities.

In September 2008, an intensified campaign against human trafficking ("massive exploitation of safe migration") was launched by the Visayan Forum Foundation, Inc. (VFFI), a non-governmental organization with the support of the United States Ambassador to the Republic of the Philippines, United States embassy. Kristie A. Kenney said at the launch: "Human trafficking is a global problem. It is modern-day slavery and victims rarely have a voice." The VFFI provide halfway houses for trafficking victims, and the Philippine Ports Authority built halfway houses in ports for rescued victims. But DOJ Inter-Agency Council Against Trafficking said that the campaign against human trafficking had no budget.

The Recovery Empowerment Networking and Employment for Women Foundation (RENEW), founded in 2005, has set up a prevention program in partnership with the Department of Social Policy and Social Work at the University of Oxford (UK) and Systems Plus College Foundation (Philippines). This prevention program involves identifying female youth who are most at risk of being trafficked and/or prostituted and inviting them to enter the RENEW program and has been recognised as a best practice model by the National Women's Summit held in Manila in 2009, Soroptimist International in 2010, and the Coalition Against the Trafficking of Women (CATW) in 2011.

=== Senate inquiry ===
On September 15, 2004, the first hearing was held on escort services. followed by a second hearing on September 22, 2004, attended by well-known movie personalities and a third hearing, attended by representatives from KTVs.

Senator Bong Revilla, on July 26, 2006, called for coordination with the Philippine National Police vis-a-vis the public, the whistleblowers and anti-prostitution Internet online petitioner initiators, to shed light and solve the alleged prostitution in the Philippines, sexual slavery or trafficking in human beings dens in Angeles City. Revilla re-filed Senate Bill No. 12, the "Anti Pornography Bill."

However, Angeles City police Chief Sonny Cunanan denied the allegations, alleging "the Women's and Children's Concerned Section (WCCS) and other agencies of the Angeles City Government that are responsible for the regular inspection of different bars and nightclubs have no records about the existence of a sex slave camp in the city." But he confirmed that "Angeles intelligence policemen, in coordination with other counterparts, were directed to look into the veracity of the report and file necessary charges against the operators of the illegal activities if these really exist."

=== Batingaw Network ===
On September 15, 2007, the Children and Youth Secretariat of the Anti-Child Pornography Alliance (ACPA-Pilipinas) launched Batingaw Network to protect and save children from all abuses and exploitations. It is the biggest coalition against child pornography (cyber-sex dens; Internet shops with pornographic cubicles). It declared September 28 as the "National Day of Awareness and Unity against Child Pornography."

== See also ==
- Human trafficking in the Philippines
- Prostitution in the Philippines
