= Chasing the Dime =

2002 crime novel by Michael Connelly

- First edition
- Author: Michael Connelly
- Language: English
- Genre: Crime, mystery, thriller
- Publisher: Little, Brown and Company
- Publication date: October 15, 2002
- Media type: Print (hardcover, paperback)
- Pages: 320
- ISBN: 0-7528-2141-5
- OCLC: 50494548

Chasing the Dime is a crime thriller novel, and the twelfth novel by American author Michael Connelly. It is his twelfth novel overall, and the only one to feature protagonist Henry Pierce.

The book was published on October 15, 2002, the story is told in third-person narrative. The novel's title is a phrase used by Pierce and his associates in reference to their pursuit of a molecular computer the size of a dime. The title may also refer to Pierce's pursuit of the missing woman whose phone number he inherited, since the slang term "dime" can be used to describe a beautiful woman (a perfect 10).

== Plot ==
Henry Pierce's nanotechnology company is racing to be the first to create a molecular computer that can fight disease. He and his partner Charlie Condon are preparing an investor presentation.

Having recently been dumped by his girlfriend, Nicole, he begins investigating an unexplained series of phone calls from men looking for "Lilly" to distract himself. After getting the name of a website from a caller, Pierce finds that Lilly is a marketed escort who last had Pierce's new number. He calls another escort, Robin, who says she hasn't seen her. Finding the company that hosts the site and the owner's name, Billy Wentz, Pierce visits its office. He social engineers a secretary and a post worker for Lilly's address. He finds no sign of her there and enlists his friend Cody Zeller, a white hat hacker, to investigate Wentz.

Pierce meets with and bribes Robin, who warns him that Wentz and his boss "Grady" are dangerous, and directs Pierce to Lilly's spare apartment, where he finds a bloody mattress. At the police station, Detective Bob Renner questions Pierce as a suspect. After leaving, Pierce suspects police searched his car. The next day, he meets a P.I. who last investigated Lilly's disappearance. He urges Pierce to back off. At his apartment, Pierce is accosted by two men. One beats him before the larger one, "Six-Eight", dangles him from the twelfth story balcony. The smaller man, Wentz, demands he stay away. While hospitalized, Renner questions a drugged Pierce and records an incriminating statement, forcing Pierce to seek a lawyer. Days later, his presentation wins a major investor, though he grows paranoid when he finds an unfamiliar key in his bag for a storage unit bought under his name. Visiting it, he finds Lilly's frozen corpse. Realizing that he is being framed, he hides the body.

Believing that Nicole, once an employee at Pierce's company, is colluding with rivals, Pierce goes to her house. She denies it and, in a heated moment, the two briefly have sex before she kicks him out. Pierce visits Robin (real name Lucy) to apologize. She tells him Grady's car was at Lilly's house when she disappeared. Recognizing the car as Zeller's, Pierce works with Renner to bait Zeller into his work's laboratory and get a confession. That night, after being locked in, Zeller admits that big names in the pharmaceutical industry paid him to sabotage Pierce's project, and that he targeted Lilly knowing Pierce would want to atone for the death of his sister, an escort who was murdered. Before Renner can arrest him, Wentz and Six-Eight arrive and a shootout ensues, killing Six-Eight and Zeller. Pierce turns off the voice-activated lights, grabs a hidden gun off Zeller, and hides. When Wentz finds him, Pierce reactivates the lights and shoots him twice in the head, killing him. He finds Renner wounded and calls for backup. In the aftermath, Pierce discusses with Condon their next steps now that their project has been greenlit, and seeks to make amends with Nicole.

== Continuity ==
Pierce's sister Isabelle was a victim of the Dollmaker, a serial killer who was shot and killed by Harry Bosch in The Concrete Blonde (1994). Janis Langwiser also advised Bosch in Angels Flight (1999). Detective Bob Renner later works alongside Bosch in the Open-Unsolved Unit in The Closers (2005). The adult website that Wentz runs, "LA-Darlings," is mentioned as being used by another character in The Lincoln Lawyer (2005) to advertise their services.

== Reception ==
Janet Maslin of The New York Times wrote that the novel "...creates a scarily high-tech brand of intrigue. Mr. Connelly is a spare, expeditious storyteller with a natural talent for generating forward momentum.” Publishers Weekly wrote, "Connelly’s plotting is shrink-wrap tight, his characters… are smartly drawn. It’s the rare reader who will be able to finger the villain behind all the mayhem. …this is the perfect book for a long airplane ride…”
