= Renew Foundation =

Christian non-profit organization

The Recovery Empowerment Networking and Employment for Women Foundation (RENEW), also known as Renew Foundation, is an international Christian non-profit non-government organization in the Philippines established in 2005, dedicated to empowering female survivors of human trafficking and prostitution in the Philippines.

== Organization ==
The foundation was founded in Angeles City in 2005 by Maylyn and Paulo Fuller in order to help eradicate trafficking and empower victims of prostitution.

RENEW is licensed by the Department of Social Welfare and Development (DSWD) in the Philippines to provide residential care, social and health care programs. RENEW is also a UK registered charity.

RENEW is funded by individual donations, by grants from UNAIDS and by the U.N. Office on Drugs and Crime.

== Mission and vision ==
The mission and vision of the Renew Foundation are the following:

To offer renewal through freedom, faith in Christ, and economic opportunity to Filipino women and children exploited through trafficking and prostitution.
To eradicate the human trafficking of women and children through advocacy, networking and education for the purpose of supporting, protecting and empowering victims.

== Goals, projects, activities and media coverage ==
RENEW offers programs of prevention, intervention, and re-integration. The prevention program, which involves identifying female youth who are most at risk of being trafficked and inviting them to enter the RENEW program, has been set up in partnership with the Department of Social Policy and Social Work at the University of Oxford (UK) and Systems Plus College Foundation (Philippines) and was recognised as a best practice model by the National Women's Summit held in Manila in 2009, Soroptimist International in 2010, and the Coalition Against the Trafficking of Women (CATW) in 2011. The Soroptimist Ruby Award was awarded to Maylyn Fuller for her tireless work to improve the lives of trafficked women and girls in the city.

The programs also aim at establishing alternative, sustainable means of income to the women and to provide education, outreach, advocacy and spiritual renewal.

In 2010, CNN reported that the foundation "offers shelter-based programs, housing, food, legal representation and education courses, all of which aim to help women return to their families or reintegrate into the community" and that is "also has a keen interest in helping child victims of the sex trade".

RENEW also attempt to find employment for the women in various companies such as call centers, companies involved with tourism, 5-star hotels, or golf courses, and provides them with training for such employment.

RENEW also helps female survivors of human trafficking and prostitution who have become mothers locate the fathers of their children. RENEW points out that fathers who do not provide child support may be confronted with a court trial, with possible consequences such as a ban from re-entering the Philippines.

Foundation director Paulo Fuller claims a high success rate for RENEW's program, stating that over 80 percent of the women who enter the program do not return to prostitution.
