= Prostitution in Cambodia =

Prostitution in Cambodia is illegal, but prevalent. A 2008 Cambodian Law on Suppression of Human Trafficking and Sexual Exploitation has proven controversial, with international concerns regarding human rights abuses resulting from it, such as outlined in the 2010 Human Rights Watch report.

The comprehensive Law on Suppression of Human Trafficking and Sexual Exploitation was enacted in 2008. It punishes the trafficking of people, the managing of prostitutes and the maintaining of a brothel, as well as soliciting in public and distributing pornography. The mere act of exchanging sex for money is not outlawed.

The Women’s Network for Unity is a Cambodian sex worker organization which was established in 2000. It lobbies for legal and human rights and better working conditions for sex workers and aims to amend the 2008 law.

In 2016 UNAIDS estimated there to be 34,000 prostitutes in the country, many from Vietnam.

== History ==
Sexual exchange has existed in Cambodia for centuries, but the events of the 20th century created a very unstable situation. During the Khmer Rouge years (1975–1979) prostitution was completely banned and punishable by death resulting in its virtual elimination in a highly totalitarian social system. Under the new State of Cambodia (1979–1993) commercial sex started to re-emerge.

After the dismantlement of the State of Cambodia, about 20,000 male troops and civilian personnel of the United Nations Transitional Authority in Cambodia (UNTAC) (1992–1993) arrived in Cambodia together with many NGOs and business interests from abroad, creating a new market for sexual services in a very poor country. UNTAC did little to stem the growth of prostitution in the country. Norodom Sihanouk had many reservations about the whole UNTAC operation, for the massive presence of UN foreign troops led in his eyes to the abuse and dishonor of Cambodian women.

Following UNTAC withdrawal in August 1993, demand was reduced, and a drop in the number of commercial sex establishments and sex workers was apparent. By mid-1994 the numbers started to increase again in a period of political instability. By the mid-1990s police were harassing sex workers, but also owned many of the brothels, which were divided into Vietnamese or Khmer. Workers between 15 and 18 were not uncommon, but some establishments, such as those in Toul Kork and Svay Pak, specialised in providing younger workers.

NGOs became alarmed by the growth of child prostitution along with number of women and children abducted sold for prostitution. By 1995 it appeared that women from some surrounding countries were entering Cambodia. International concern was raised and some raids were carried out including one by the International Justice Mission (2004). This had the effect of displacing the workers.

The number of prostitutes in Cambodia rose from about 6,000 at the time of the 1991 Paris Peace Accords, to over 20,000 after the arrival of UNTAC personnel in 1992, and declined to between 4,000 and 10,000 following their withdrawal.

== Child sex tourism ==
Cambodia has child sex tourism present. Some children are sold by their own parents, others are lured by what they think are legitimate job offers like waitressing. Pimps are reported to imprison young children who are virgins, not putting them to work until they have been presented to a series of bidders such as high-ranking military officers, politicians, businessmen and foreign tourists. Young girls working in brothels are in effect sex slaves. They receive no money, only food, and there are armed guards to stop them from running away.

Children are often held captive, beaten, and starved to force them into prostitution. The United States Immigration and Customs Enforcement Agency has extradited American sex tourists back home for prosecution. Vietnamese child prostitutes make up one third of child prostitutes in Cambodia, and Cambodian brothels employ girls and women from Vietnam.

== Foreign prostitutes in Cambodia ==
Russian, Vietnamese, Thai prostitutes also work in Cambodia. Unofficial estimates in 2005 suggest there are as many as 15,000 prostitutes in Phnom Penh, and that up to 35% of them have been smuggled into Cambodia from Vietnam, mostly from the southwestern provinces of Vietnam (Long An, An Giang, Song Be, Kien Giang, Dong Thap, Can Tho and Ho Chi Minh City). Many Vietnanese child prostitutes are enslaved in brothels in Phnom Penh, Cambodia.

== Violence against prostitutes ==
Violence against prostitutes, especially gang rape, called bauk in Cambodian, is common. Perpetrators include customers and police officers. According to some sources, such assaults are not condemned by society due to the stigmatization of prostitutes – a survey on opinions on bauk showed that only 13 percent of the males and 13 percent of the females interviewed considered that sex forced by a group of men on a prostitute was rape. The most common response – 33.4 percent of males and 40.7 percent of females – was that bauk was dangerous because of the potential transmission of sexually transmitted diseases; 12.5 percent of males and 8.1 percent of females said that gang rape against prostitutes didn't hurt anyone because the women were prostitutes and saw many men anyway; while 12.7 percent of males and 16.7 percent of females said it was better that this happened to prostitutes than to other women.

Despite the social stigma cast on prostitutes, paying for sex is very common among men in Cambodia – while Khmer culture demands female virginity, it links masculinity to sexual activity, and as a result, prostitutes are the object of most young men's sexual encounters throughout their youth and early adulthood. Sexual violence against prostitutes was also described in a 2010 Amnesty International report, called Breaking the Silence – Sexual Violence in Cambodia.

== Sexual health ==
Cambodia has a high prevalence of HIV and AIDS, being one of the worst affected countries in Asia. By 1995 there were between 50,000 and 90,000 Cambodians affected by AIDS, according to a WHO estimate. Transmission is mainly through heterosexual contact. Factors contributing to this include poverty, the presence of other STIs which facilitate HIV transmission, and a highly mobile workforce. This pattern is also seen in the sex worker population.

Since 2010 there's been an estimated 45% decrease in new HIV infections with condom promotion. Since 2001, there has been a "100% condom program" in place, which promoted safe sex.

== Opposition to sex trade ==
The U.S. State Department frequently condemns Cambodia for its sex trade, and downgraded their categorisation of the country in 2004.

Somaly Mam has fabricated a number of anti-trafficking stories to attract foreign aid donations. Mam ran the foundation AFESIP, which has been influential in helping the police raid hotels and kidnap their employees.

Some international commentators have noted that the garment industry in Cambodia is abusive, and efforts to remove sex workers from brothels and give them jobs making clothes can backfire if some return to the brothels.

== Sex trafficking ==
Cambodia is a source, transit, and destination country for women and children subjected to sex trafficking. Cambodian adults and children migrate to other countries within the region and increasingly to the Middle East for work; many are subjected sex trafficking. Migrants using irregular migration channels, predominantly with the assistance of unlicensed brokers, are at an increased risk of trafficking, but those using licensed recruiting agents also become victims of sex trafficking. A significant number of women from rural areas are recruited under false pretences to travel to China to enter into marriages with Chinese men, who often incur as much as $20,000 in debt to brokers facilitating the transaction; some of these women are then subjected to forced prostitution as a result of this debt. Women from Cambodia have been trafficked to Malaysia.

All of Cambodia’s 25 provinces are sources for human trafficking. Sex trafficking is largely clandestine; Cambodian and ethnic Vietnamese women and girls move from rural areas to cities and tourist destinations, where they are subjected to sex trafficking in brothels and, more frequently, such “indirect” sex establishments as beer gardens, massage parlors, salons, karaoke bars, retail spaces, and non-commercial sites. Cambodian men form the largest source of demand for children exploited in prostitution; however, men from elsewhere in Asia and Europe, the United States, Australia, and South Africa travel to Cambodia to engage in child sex tourism.

Vietnamese women and children, many of whom are victims of debt bondage, travel to Cambodia and are subjected to sex trafficking. NGOs report criminal gangs transport some Vietnamese victims through Cambodia before they are exploited in Thailand and Malaysia. Traffickers in Cambodia are most commonly family or community members or small networks of independent brokers. Endemic corruption aids and abets trafficking crimes. Some police reportedly solicit commercial sex with children. Corrupt officials facilitate cross-border trafficking, thwart progress on investigations and prosecutions, and in some cases profit directly from establishments suspected of trafficking.

The United States Department of State Office to Monitor and Combat Trafficking in Persons ranks Cambodia as a 'Tier 2' country.

== See also ==
- Svay Pak
- Bargirl

Regional:

- Prostitution in India
- Prostitution in Indonesia
- Prostitution in Thailand
- Prostitution in Philippines
