= Women's Network for Unity =

Cambodian sex worker organization

The Women's Network for Unity (WNU) is a sex workers' organization in Cambodia which was established in 2000 and currently has about 6,400 members. It works against the stigmatization of sex work and lobbies for the legal and human rights of sex workers and for safer working conditions. Accordingly, the organization aims to amend the 2008 Law on Suppression of Human Trafficking and Sexual Exploitation. The WNU was established by the Women's Agenda for Change (WAC) organisation that was founded by the Australian aid worker Rosanna Barbero. In 1999 several NGOs working on the issue of women's rights in development came together to discuss sex workers' rights with the aim of creating spaces and opportunities for sex workers to be at the forefront of the development agenda. The WNU was sponsored, supported and received training from the WAC activist, both local and international staff.

== See also ==
- Prostitution in Cambodia
