= Prostitution in Indonesia =

Prostitution in Indonesia is legally considered a "crime against decency/morality", although it is widely practiced, tolerated and even regulated in some areas. Some women are financially motivated to become prostitutes, while others may be forced by friends, relatives or strangers. Traditionally, they have met with customers in entertainment venues or special prostitution complexes, or lokalisasi (localization). However, recently internet forums and Facebook have been used to facilitate prostitute-client relations. In recent years, child sex tourism has become an issue at the resort islands of Batam and Bali.

Female sex tourism also emerged in the late 20th century in Bali, where young Balinese male sex workers meet with Japanese, European, and Australian women. UNAIDS estimate there to be 226,791 prostitutes in the country.

== Causes ==
In Indonesia, one of the main reasons for a prostitute to enter the business is the appeal of earning money quickly. The Jakarta Post reported that high-end prostitutes in Jakarta could earn Rp 15 million–Rp 30 million (USD 1,755 to 3,510) monthly, able to charge more than Rp 3 million (USD 350) per session for their services. Those entering prostitution for money come from both middle-class and poor families.

Another major cause is forced prostitution. Young women are offered employment opportunities in major cities, then raped and forced to prostitute themselves while paying money to their pimps. They may also be sold by their parents. The International Labour Organization (ILO) reports that roughly 70 percent of Indonesian child prostitutes are brought into the trade by their family or friends.

== Forms ==
Prostitution exists in many forms and is practiced by many different sexes, genders, orientations and ages. Bali, for example, is known for its "Kuta Cowboys", male sex workers who solicit foreign tourists.

Prostitution encompasses various sexual orientations. The most common is heterosexual female prostitution, though transvestite and male homosexual prostitution also exist to a lesser extent. Child prostitution also exists in certain tourism resort islands, such as Batam and Bali. It is estimated that 40,000 to 70,000 Indonesian children engage in prostitution within the country.

Prostitutes sometimes work in brothels, some with over 200 prostitutes. The last large red-light district containing many brothels was Gang Dolly in Surabaya, one of the largest in Southeast Asia, which closed in 2014. Prostitutes can be found in discotheques, massage parlours, and karaoke rooms, and also visible on certain streets. They can also be booked via telephone.

Online prostitution is also common. In Internet forums, prostitutes and pornography are offered to registered members of good standing, as measured by their activity on the forum. A senior member of the forum posts a "free report" offering a description of the member's experience with a prostitute; contact information is provided upon request by private message. Prostitution rings on Facebook have also been reported.

== Legal status ==
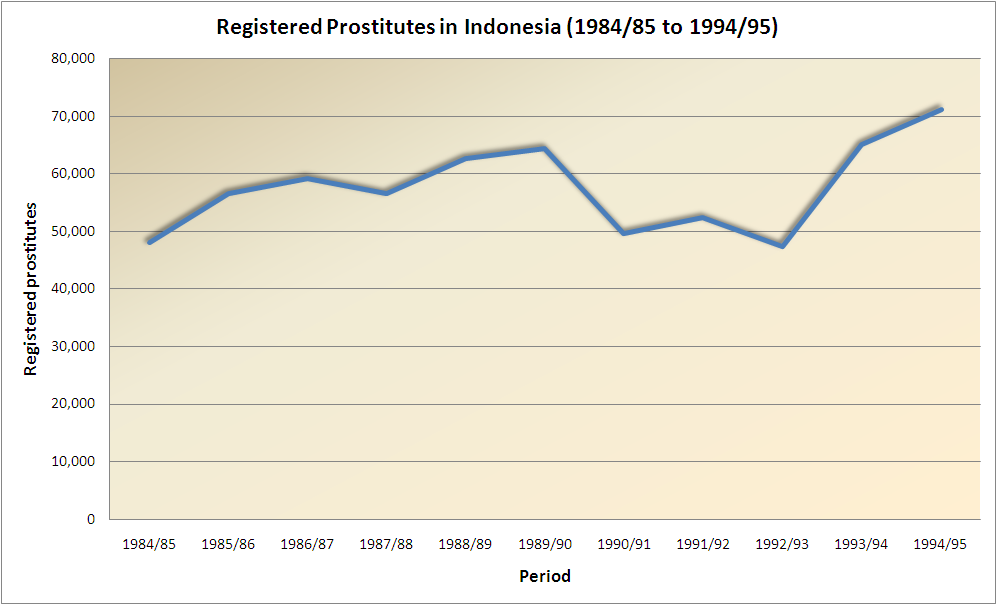
Number of registered prostitutes in Indonesia, from 1984 to 1995

Prostitution is not specifically addressed in the law. Since the 2023 Indonesian Penal Code came into force in January 2026, premarital sex and extramarital sex may be punished if a complaint is filed by a parent, child, or spouse (Article 411), while the promotion of obscene acts is punished under Articles 420 and 421 without the need for a complaint.

Before 2026 many officials interpreted "crimes against decency/morality" to apply to prostitution. Prostitution was widespread and largely tolerated, despite its contradiction with popular societal and religious norms. Prostitution was most visibly manifested in Indonesia’s brothel complexes, or lokalisasi, which are found throughout the country. These brothels were managed under local government regulations. During or after raids by the police, the prostitutes were able to pay and be released from custody; thus, sex worker advocate Anna Sulikah opined that police raids are "nothing more than an income source for public order officers".

The Indonesian Child Protection Commission (KPAI) estimates that 30 percent of the prostitutes in Indonesia are below 18 years of age. The ILO puts the total number of child prostitutes in Jakarta at 5,000; according to the Jakarta city government, this is concentrated in Prumpung (North Jakarta), Grogol (West Jakarta) Tanah Abang (Central Jakarta), Block M (South Jakarta), as well as Jatinegara and Ciracas (both East Jakarta). Child sex tourism occurs, especially on the resort islands of Bali and Batam.

== History ==
Masalah "P", a 1952 book by the Social Ministry of Indonesia on prostitution

One of the earliest reports of prostitution in ancient Indonesia is from a Chinese source. The Tang dynasty Ch'iu-T'ang shu and Hsin T'ang shu historical records, which originated circa 640 CE, reported that in the country of Ho-ling in Java, there were a number of "poisonous women". Those who had sex with these harlots would suffer festering wounds and die afterwards. This was the earliest record of prostitution and its connection with sexually-transmitted disease in ancient Java.

Little is known about precolonial Indonesia's prostitution, although the purchase of sex slaves and "quasi-contractual" sexual relations are thought to have occurred. Following the spread of Islam in Indonesia, prostitution is thought to have increased due to Islam's disapproval of contractual weddings. Javanese kings kept large stables of concubines, while Balinese widows without familial support could be forced into prostitution by their king.

Serat Centhini, an early 19th century Javanese manuscript, refers to the prostitution business in Central Java and Yogyakarta. The manuscript describes various sexual positions and techniques mastered by prostitutes in Java in order to satisfy their clients. Serat Centhini also says that there was once a thriving brothel near the royal tomb of Imogiri.

During the early Dutch colonial period, European men wishing to find sexual gratification began hiring native prostitutes or concubines; this was accepted by financially motivated local women as well as some families, who volunteered their daughters. Because interracial marriage was discouraged or outright forbidden, this arrangement was accepted by Dutch leaders.

Widespread prostitution began in the early 1800s, when the number of concubines kept by the Royal Netherlands East Indies soldiers and government officials declined; native men leaving their wives to look for work in other areas also contributed to its rise. In 1852 the colonial government began requiring regular health checks of prostitutes to check for syphilis and other venereal diseases; prostitutes also had to carry identification cards. These did not curb the growth of prostitution, which increased dramatically during a period of extensive construction in the late 1800s.

The 1852 law was later replaced by another, more stringent, public morality law in 1913, which criminalized "purposely bring[ing] about the fornication of others with a third party and make this his profession", or pimping; no mention was made of prostitutes. Enforcement of these laws proved more nearly impossible, and for a period of time investigation of brothels required a permit from the governor.

During the Japanese occupation of the Dutch East Indies, existing prostitutes were selected to serve the Japanese army in special brothels. Other women and girls, both native and Dutch, were forced to become "comfort women". After World War II, the migration of women from remote villages to cities, coupled with a high divorce rate, caused another increase in prostitution.

== Response ==
Government response to prostitution in Indonesia has been varied. A common response is to attempt banning it and closing brothels. Another proposed response is the taxing of prostitutes' fees; such proposals have met controversy, with the revenues being considered haraam.

== Effects ==
Prostitution has been blamed for the increasing HIV/AIDS rates in various parts of Indonesia, including Central Java and Bali. A lack of health control in brothels and a lack of condom use have been blamed; in 2010 the Bali AIDS commission reported that only 40% of clients used protection.

Prostitutes themselves may fall victim to psycho-social problems, such as multiple personality disorder. When servicing customers or dealing with their pimps, they may be physically and mentally abused. They are also at risk of catching HIV/AIDS.

== Sex trafficking ==
Indonesia is a major source, and to a much lesser extent, destination and transit country for women and children subjected to sex trafficking. Each of its 34 provinces is a source and destination of trafficking. Indonesian women and girls are subjected to sex trafficking, primarily in Malaysia, Taiwan, and the Middle East. Many women and girls are exploited in sex trafficking. Victims are often recruited with offers of jobs in restaurants, factories, or domestic service, but are subjected to sex trafficking. Debt bondage is particularly prevalent among sex trafficking victims. Women and girls are subjected to sex trafficking near mining operations in Maluku, Papua, and Jambi provinces. Child sex tourism is prevalent in the Riau Islands bordering Singapore, and Bali is a destination for Indonesians traveling to engage in child sex tourism.

The United States Department of State Office to Monitor and Combat Trafficking in Persons ranks Indonesia as a 'Tier 2' country.

== See also ==
- Bargirl
- Prostitution in India
- Prostitution in Cambodia
- Prostitution in Thailand
- Prostitution in Philippines
