= Human trafficking in the Philippines =

Human trafficking and the prostitution of children has been a significant issue in the Philippines, often controlled by organized crime syndicates. Human trafficking is a crime against humanity.

With the Philippines having a large migrant population, men are exploited in fishing, construction, and farming jobs. Whereas, women are exploited in more domestic and caretaker roles. Children are exploited for sex and child labor trafficking.

In an effort to deal with the problem, the Philippines passed R.A. 9208, the Anti-Trafficking in Persons Act of 2003, a penal law against human trafficking, sex tourism, sex slavery and child prostitution. In 2006, enforcement was reported to be inconsistent. But by 2017, the U.S. State Department's Office to Monitor and Combat Trafficking in Persons had placed the country in "Tier 1" (fully compliant with minimum standards of the U.S. Trafficking Victims Protection Act).

== Statistics ==
An undated United Nations Children's Fund (UNICEF) document estimated that 60,000 to 100,000 children in the Philippines were involved in prostitution rings as of 2009. According to the International Labour Organization (ILO) about 100,000 children were involved in prostitution as of 2009. There is a high incidence of child prostitution in tourist areas. An undetermined number of children are forced into exploitative labour operations.

As of 2020, the Philippines is ranked as Tier 1 in the Trafficking in Persons Report of the United States (US) State Department after substantial efforts.

== Problem areas and history ==
A report published in 2004 by the Vatican stated: The Philippines has a serious trafficking problem of women and children illegally recruited into the tourist industry for sexual exploitation. Destinations within the country are Metro Manila, Angeles City, Olongapo City, towns in Bulacan, Batangas, Cebu City, Davao and Cagayan de Oro City and other sex tourist resorts such as Puerto Galera, Pagsanjan, San Fernando Pampanga, and many beach resorts throughout the country. The promise of recruiters offers women and children attractive jobs in the country or abroad, and instead they are coerced and forced and controlled into the sex industry for tourists.

=== Puerto Galera ===
There are numerous cases of child molestation that have been reported in Puerto Galera, a beach resort on Mindoro Island three hours south of Manila. The area is a favorite for foreign child molesters seeking children. Puerto Galera was described in 1997 as one of the Philippines top five spots for child prostitution.

=== Angeles City ===
In 1991 a volcanic eruption of Mount Pinatubo forced an evacuation and destroyed much of the Clark Air Base, a major United States military facility located 40 miles (60 km) northwest of Manila, which closed shortly thereafter. Most of the sex trade around the base closed at the same time due to the loss of the GI customers. Mayor Alfredo Lim proceeded to crack down on Manila's remaining sex industry, causing many of these businesses to relocate to Angeles City, which borders on the closed base, and was becoming a popular tourist destination especially with former GIs. By the late 1990s, UNICEF estimated that there are 60,000 child prostitutes in the Philippines, describing Angeles City brothels as "notorious" for offering sex with children. In 1997, the BBC reported that UNICEF estimated many of the 200 brothels in the notorious Angeles City offer children for sex.

The current trade is dominated by Australian bar operators and sustained by tourists seeking inexpensive sex. In bars catering mostly to foreign men, girls are sold for a "bar fine". Conditions are sometimes brutal. Children and teenagers are lured into the industry from poor areas by promises of money and care, and are kept there by threats, debt bondage and the fear of poverty. Angeles City is one of the largest sex tourist destinations in the world with just over 15 thousand women working in its various sex establishments (brothels, bars and videokes).

In 2005, UNICEF reported evidence of growing child pornography production in Angeles City. Children as young as ten years old have been rescued from brothels in Angeles.

STD cases rose five times. The RHWC treated 1,421 cases in 2005, 2,516 cases in 2006 and 6,229 cases in 2007. Most of the afflicted were women.

=== Pagsanjan, Laguna ===
CNN stated in 2010 that "A decade ago, Pagsanjan, located about 60 miles south of Manila, became known as a popular location for men seeking homosexual prostitutes." Pagsanjan began to attract an increasing number of child molesters. "In the '80s, Pagsanjan was declared by international gay publications as a paradise for them, a gay paradise, a haven for homosexuals", said Dr. Sonia Zaide, an activist who is particularly concerned by the expansion of the town's sex trade to include minors, mostly young boys. Time magazine reported in 1993 that Pagsanjan was a favorite destination for sex tourists seeking children. The Filipino government began a crackdown on the child sex industry in Pagsanjan and 23 people of varying nationalities were arrested. Foreign child molesters take advantage of the poverty, with children often being used as sexual currency by their own parents. The World Bank World Development Report for 1995 reported that the town of Pagsanjan through civic action had dramatically reduced child prostitution.

=== Davao City ===
October 5 has become the Day of No Prostitution Campaign in Davao City. In 2005, the Philippines Information Agency reported documented cases of children as young as 10 years old forced into prostitution in Davao. Davao provinces, along with the Caraga region, have become the favorites of child traffickers posing as tourists.

=== Cebu ===
In 2001, it was estimated there were 10,000 young girls trafficked into sex slavery in Cebu. "What has become very obvious is a growing market for child prostitutes," said Father Heinz, a Catholic priest who has been involved for more than a decade in initiatives to beat the pimps and child-traffickers. It was reported in 2009 that Cebu remained a destination, source and transit area for human trafficking, where women and children victims are brought to be "processed". It was reported in 2005 that Cebu had been the destination of international and domestic trafficking of children, aged from 11 to 17 years old.

=== Pampanga ===
More than a dozen of cybersex operations have been busted in the Pampanga province and Angeles City areas, this resulted in the rescue of hundreds of exploited women, most of them minors or below 18 years of age. Hundreds of computers sets have been seized, including sex toys and other gadgets used in the cybersex operations mostly maintained by foreigners. A forum hosted by the Prosecution Law Enforcement and Community Coordinating Service (proleccs) discussed several factors that contribute to the human trafficking problem and these include poverty, the proliferation of underground cybersex through internet and sex tourism.

=== Lucena City ===
Lucena ports have been identified by anti-human trafficking advocates as transit points used by syndicates engaged in the recruitment of innocent women from remote areas destined for prostitution dens in other parts of the country.

=== Subic Bay ===
In 1988 a Naval Investigative undercover operation based in Subic Bay were offered children for sex as young as four. Many of those involved in the prostitution of children have been brought to justice in the courts. Most of the 16,000 women estimated to have worked the bars around the largest overseas naval base were forced into the sex industry. One 16-year-old child tells of her experience in Subic Bay: "She was locked in a room for a month, starved and force-fed drugs and alcohol to ensure she was addicted and could be more easily controlled. She was often beaten unconscious for refusing to have sex with customers." Pregnancy, abortion, the spread of disease and drug abuse were just some of the indignities imposed on Filipinas. Despite the US pull-out from Subic Bay in 1992, continues to fester, catering to a new generation of civilian sex tourists. The former naval base, and current visits by American military have been the subject of protests by welfare groups and activists in Subic. Brandishing placards and chanting slogans, members of WAIL and GABRIELA called for justice for all victims of human rights abuses.

=== Olongapo ===
Trafficking of Women and Children in Olongapo was rampant during the time of the Subic Naval Base located close by. In 1988, the US Naval Investigative Service confirmed the existence of child prostitution in Olongapo City. After the base closure a new child molesters clientele from countries such as Australia and Europe moved in. Olongapo special prosecutor Dorentino Z. Floresta states, "Politicians do not want people to know that these things are happening in Olongapo," said Floresta.

=== Visayas ===
Eastern Visayas continues to be a source of women and children being sent to Metro Manila brothels and sweatshops. Department of Social Welfare and Development officials said the number of human trafficking cases was increasing. Leticia Corillo, DSWD regional director stated that the victims were mostly children and women. Seventy percent are aged from 13 to 17 years old. A DSWD report, said the Waray towns of Paranas and Jiabong and Calbayog City in Samar province and Mapanas and Las Navas in Northern Samar are considered as human trafficking "hotspots".

== Trafficking of Filipinas to overseas destinations ==
The US Department of State in July 2001, estimated that about 40,000 Filipino women were trafficked into the sex and entertainment industry in Japan using entertainment visas. A 2007 report by CBC News estimates the number of Filipinas trafficked into Japan for prostitution to be as high as 150,000. Club owners in Japan oblige Filipino entertainers to date their customers during daytime and, in some cases, force them into prostitution. Some of them were sold allegedly to the Yakuza for $2,400 to $18,000. A trafficker earns $3,000–$5,000 for each woman or girl sold in the international sex trade.

== Sex tourism ==
An article in the newspaper Davao Today reports that, according to experts, the growth of tourism in the Philippines in places such as Cebu and Boracay, has given rise to the sexual exploitation of women and children. In a 2004 article, the People's Recovery, Empowerment Development Assistance Foundation (PREDA) reported in 2004 that ECPAT, which it describes as "a global network that campaigns against child prostitution", estimates that 300,000 sex tourists from Japan alone visit the Philippines every year. In the same article, PREDA reports, "many others are British." Local NGO Preda states that the majority of the "customers" (the word used by the children to describe their abusers) are local tourists and about ten percent are foreign tourists. The foreign customers, according to arrest figures compiled by ECPAT Manila rank in frequency as follows: American, Japanese, Australian, British, German, Swiss, other nationalities.

UNICEF noted that child trafficking in the Philippines is the highest incidence of child prostitution in a tourist area.

== Sex trafficking ==
Sex trafficking in the Philippines is a significant problem. Filipina women and girls have been forced into prostitution and been physically and psychologically abused.

== Foreign child molesters ==
The Philippines continued to assist U.S. law enforcement authorities in the transfer to U.S. custody of Americans who sexually exploited children. Foreign child molesters are a major problem in a country like the Philippines. Some foreign child molesters are very well connected and have positions in industry and politics. Profile studies of these child molesters show they come mostly from Europe and are usually well off, married and with children of their own. Some foreign child molesters arrange with bribes and corrupt practices to get the children out of the country and abuse them in another country. The problem of foreign child molesters continues to be reported in the press. It was reported in 1999 that foreign child molesters have operated openly in the Philippines.

In 2008, the Bureau of Immigration (BI) warned of a new modus operandi of foreign child molesters in the Philippines, saying "The child molesters usually meet the mothers, sometimes even the grandmothers, of possible victims online and make them their girlfriends. The women usually let the economically better-off foreigners into their lives and their homes, not knowing that the men would later pounce on their young children."

It was reported in 2007 that in Angeles, Pampanga (characterized as a hotspot for trafficking and sex trade), child molesters were increasingly using the Internet to lure other child molesters to come to the Philippines. Live video streaming on the Web was reported to show children being sexually abused. Other child molesters were reported to browse personal profiles or lurk in chat rooms to find their victims.

== Mail-order bride trafficking ==
Republic Act 6955 declares as unlawful "the practice of matching Filipino women for marriage to foreign nationals on a mail order basis." It is also unlawful under the R.A. 9208, the Anti-Trafficking in Persons Act of 2003, a penal law against human trafficking, sex tourism, sex slavery and child prostitution. The Philippines Government first outlawed bride agencies in 1990 after being alarmed at reports of widespread abuse of Philippine women in other countries.

There have been 5,000 Filipina mail order brides entering the United States every year since 1986, a total of 55,000 as of 1997. Matibag, an assistant professor of the Department of Sociology at the Iowa State University, said browsing for potential brides on websites is as easy as shopping for a shirt. Each woman is assigned a catalogue number. Maria Regina Angela Galias, head of the Migrant Integration and Education Division of the Commission on Filipinos Overseas (CFO), stated that South Korea and Japan have become the top destinations of Filipina mail-order brides. Over 70% of Philippine women live in poverty, thus making them particularly vulnerable to the mail-order industry.

== Debt bondage ==
Debt bondage is a criminal offence under the R.A. 9208, the Anti-Trafficking in Persons Act of 2003 According to Human Rights Watch, the practice of "debt bondage" among sexual traffickers is routine, and women often find that their so-called debts only increase and can never be fully repaid. Recruiters sometimes buy children and sell them into prostitution. Most often the children have either been stolen from their villages or sold off by their poor families.

== Child-organ trafficking ==
In 2008, the National Bureau of Investigation alerted the public over the rampant smuggling of human organs in the Philippines. The NBI said smugglers are now targeting children who are kidnapped and taken abroad where their organs are sold to foreign nationals. The World Health Organization has identified the Philippines as one of the five organ trafficking hotpots. However, a 2008 proclamation by President Gloria Macapagal Arroyo has markedly decreased the frequency and ease of the commercial organ trade industry in the Philippines.

== Online scams ==
In May 2023, Philippine authorities rescued more than 1,000 human trafficking victims. The victims were lured by job postings on social media that promised good paying jobs where they would then be trapped with armed guards that prevented them from leaving. The victims worked 18 hours a day performing cryptocurrency scams. The victims would meet people on Facebook and dating apps to then pretend to fall in love and take their money.

== Efforts to control ==
Philippine law defines the worst forms of child labor as all forms of slavery or practices similar to slavery; any use of a child in prostitution, pornography, or pornographic performances; any use of a child for illegal or illicit activities; and work that is hazardous, including nine hazardous categories. The law criminalizes trafficking of children for exploitation, including trafficking for sex tourism, prostitution, pornography, forced labor, and the recruitment of children into armed conflict. The law establishes the penalty of life imprisonment and a fine for trafficking violations involving children and provides for the confiscation of any proceeds derived from trafficking crimes.

Ani Saguisag, a lawyer with the child protection group, ECPAT, identifies lax enforcement of RA 76/10 (sic—actually RA7610) as a major reason why so few offenders end up behind bars.

Department of Justice records show that from June 2003 until January 2005 there were 65 complaints received for alleged trafficking in persons violations in the entire nation.

In November 2009 The Philippine government signed into law of Republic Act 9775, also known as the Anti-Child Pornography Act of 2009, by Philippine President Gloria Macapagal Arroyo. This landmark legislation provides the full legal armor against producers, transmitters, sellers and users of child pornography in whatever form and means of production, dissemination and consumption, in public and private spaces.

Gemma Gabuya, chief of the DSWD's Social Technology Bureau, said the national government in a bid to address the problem had formed the Inter-Agency Council Against Trafficking (IACAT) in 2003 in partnership with civil society organizations and other stakeholders of PACT.

Microsoft has awarded over US$1 million through its Unlimited Potential grants to non-governmental organisations (NGOs) across six Asian countries, including the Philippines. The latest round of grants will deliver IT training courses specifically for people in human-trafficking hot spots across the region.

Unicef executive director Carol Bellamy stated, The Philippines is among the few countries that are making a dent in the fight against the trafficking of women and children.

== Protection by politicians and police ==
Some local politicians, mayors and their business cronies continue to allow the operation of clubs and bars where children are used as sexual commodities along with young women. Many women will tell how they were recruited as young as 13 and 14. They issue permits and licences for all establishments and harass and threaten those trying to rescue the children, gather evidence and bring charges against them. The United States Embassy in the Philippines states that some officials condone a climate of impunity for those that exploit trafficked women and children

== Prevention ==
In 2007, the government's Interagency Council Against Trafficking established its first anti-trafficking task force at Manila's international airport to share information on traffickers and assist victims. In 2006 the Philippine Overseas Employment Agency (POEA) issued new employment requirements for overseas Filipino household workers to protect them from widespread employer abuse and trafficking.

The Interagency Council Against Trafficking and the Commission on Filipinos Overseas set up a trafficking hotline. The hotline received 2,487 calls which led to the identification of 18 victims and 34 trafficking cases. All victims were referred to services and law enforcement.

In December 2022, the Fourth National Strategic Plan Against Trafficking in Persons 2023-2027 was approved.

== Non-governmental organizations ==
The Philippine government continues to rely heavily on non-governmental organizations (NGOs) and international organizations to provide services to victims. The Department of Social Welfare and Development operated 42 temporary shelters for victims throughout the country. Thirteen of these shelters were supported by a non-profit charity organization. Philippines law permits private prosecutors to prosecute cases under the direction and control of a public prosecutor. The government has used this provision effectively, allowing and supporting an NGO to file 23 cases in 2007.

The Philippine campaign against Child Trafficking (PACT) is an anti-child trafficking campaign that was launched by ECPAT Philippines to raise awareness on the Child Trafficking phenomena in the country. The campaign also aims to encourage local mechanisms for the prevention and protection of children against Child Trafficking as well as other programs which are unified with the intensification of the human rights of children such as the holistic recovery and reintegration of child victims of trafficking.

Stairway Foundation, a child protection NGO, came up in 2009 with its third animation film called Red Leaves Falling which is about child sex trafficking and pornography under the Break the Silence Campaign. The said film is being used by numerous government and non-government organizations to raise awareness on the issue of trafficking.

In 2010, the Office of the Ombudsman signed a memorandum of agreement with select cause-oriented groups – the Visayan Forum Foundation (VFF), Ateneo Human Rights Center (AHRC), and the International Justice Mission (IJM) – so that they could help in the collective fight against human trafficking.

VFF has rescued and helped more than 32,000 victims and potential victims of trafficking since it was established in 1991. VFF works with the Philippine coast guard, the government's Port Authority, and shipping company, Aboitez, to keep monitor arriving boats in the main ports, looking for possible traffickers traveling with groups of children. The organization has operations in four main ports serving Manila, and says it rescues between 20 and 60 children a week.

However, foreign sex traffickers and child molesters often harass Catholic and other groups by lodging multiple libel and other suits.

In 1999 the PREDA Foundation, through the International League of Action, was able to bring to justice a group of Norwegians who were trafficking children from one town in the Philippines and bringing them to Oslo for sexual abuse. The youngest of these children were six and seven years old.

== Action by foreign governments ==
Numerous overseas countries have introduced legislation (e.g. the Crimes (Child Sex Tourism) Amendment Act 1994 (Cth)) which enables them to prosecute their nationals for crimes against children overseas, only a few child molesters who have committed offences in the Philippines are charged and convicted back in their own countries for the offences. The Australian Government set up the "Australian Federal Police's Transnational Sexual Exploitation Trafficking Team" which investigates child molesters in places such as the Philippines. Some countries from which sex tourism originates, including Australia, Germany, the Netherlands, Sweden and the United States, have passed legislation which criminalizes sex tourism. In the United States, the Violent Crime Control and Law Enforcement Act of 1994 makes travel with intent to engage in any sexual act with a juvenile punishable by up to ten years' imprisonment.

On September 15, 2003, the US Department of Labor / Bureau of International Labor Affairs (ILAB) / International Child Labor Program signed a collaborative agreement with the Philippines government, and contributed US$5 million, on a Timebound Program. The Timebound Program covers sexual exploitation and trafficking of children for commercial sexual exploitation. The program was geared towards working in various parts of the Philippines.

The United States government provided a grant of 179,000 dollars to help a Philippine non-governmental organization expand its halfway house operations to help victims of human trafficking, according to a statement by the US Embassy in Manila.

The British Embassy in Manila organised a two-week course led by Scotland Yard detectives into techniques to investigate cases of child abuse. Subsequently, the Philippine National Bureau of Investigation set up an anti-child abuse division – the first squad dedicated to fighting child abuse in the country.

The United States has taken action under the 2003 PROTECT Act with a number of indictments.

The United States embassy in the Philippines involves itself in the prevention, prosecution, and protection of persons trafficked in the Philippines. The U.S. Agency for International Development (USAID) supports the work of local organizations throughout the Philippines through training frontline workers, providing legal assistance to victims, and creating dialogue around the topic to raise awareness.

== Corruption ==
Police in the Philippines have been known to guard brothels and even procure children for prostitution. NGOs have complained that the local political and legal establishments protect child molesters, sometimes even including law enforcement. The United States Embassy in the Philippines states that some officials condone a climate of impunity for those that exploited trafficked women and children.

== The victims ==
Those involved in the kidnapping of children have occasionally made video tapes of children being sexually abused.

The UN paper says there are also cases in which the children are "kidnapped, trafficked across borders or from rural to urban areas, and moved from place to place so that they effectively disappear".

Children are at risk of HIV/AIDS from child molesters.

The prevalence of gonorrhea and chlamydia was 18.6% and 29.1% respectively. Philippine law provides for compulsory HIV testing in some circumstances, and of course people may voluntarily be tested for AIDS. The Philippine government has provided a mechanism for anonymous HIV testing and guarantees anonymity and medical confidentiality in the conduct of such tests.

In the exploitative system of prostitution, bar owners and pimps make the most profit while the women are exposed to abuse, physical, emotional and psychological trauma. The absence of punitive measures for the male customers enables them to abuse the women in prostitution. The problem is compounded by the fact that society, even the church, discriminates against women in prostitution.

Victims of sex trafficking are frequently subjected to physical abuse, forced drug use, and severe psychological trauma by traffickers and clients. Research indicates that prolonged exploitation causes long-term physical and mental health issues—including higher rates of sexually transmitted infections such as HIV/AIDS, substance dependency, and severe depression—while leaving victims vulnerable to further economic and social marginalization.

At least 90 percent of HIV positive people in Angeles City were female sex workers, according to a study of the Training, Research and Information for Development Specialists Foundation Inc. (Tridev).

== Organized crime of child trafficking ==
A special BBC investigation exposes the organized crime syndicates that control the child sex slavery trafficking in the Philippines. The investigation reported there could be as many as 100,000 Philippine children involved in the local sex trade. This crime gang has a system similar to that of the Sicilian Mafia, Yakuza and Triads. They often start as a trainee field recruiter, to running individual brothels, and then to overseeing an entire network – an underworld association. Local NGO`S refer to the organized crime syndicates as the sex mafia. From the Philippines, girls are delivered to prison-like brothels in the North America, Europe, Asia and the Middle East.

== Legality ==
=== Revised Penal Code Article 202 ===
Vagrants and prostitutes; penalty. — The following are vagrants:

1. Any person having no apparent means of subsistence, who has the physical ability to work and who neglects to apply himself or herself to some lawful calling;
2. Any person found loitering about public or semi-public buildings or places or trampling or wandering about the country or the streets without visible means of support;
3. Any idle or dissolute person who ledges in houses of ill fame; ruffians or pimps and those who habitually associate with prostitutes;
4. Any person who, not being included in the provisions of other articles of this Code, shall be found loitering in any inhabited or uninhabited place belonging to another without any lawful or justifiable purpose;
5. Prostitutes.

For the purposes of this article, women who, for money or profit, habitually indulge in sexual intercourse or lascivious conduct, are deemed to be prostitutes.

Any person found guilty of any of the offenses covered by this articles shall be punished by arresto menor or a fine not exceeding 200 pesos, and in case of recidivism, by arresto mayor in its medium period to prison correccional in its minimum period or a fine ranging from 200 to 2,000 pesos, or both, in the discretion of the court.

=== Revised Penal Code Article 341 ===
Penal Code article 341 imposes a penalty to any person who "shall engage in the business or shall profit by prostitution or shall enlist the services of any other person for the purpose of prostitution."

=== Republic Act 9208 ===
Section 4 of Republic Act 9208, otherwise known as the "Anti-Trafficking in Persons Act of 2003", deems it unlawful for any person, natural or juridical, to commit any of the following acts:

(a) To recruit, transport, transfer, harbor, provide, or receive a person by any means, including those done under the pretext of domestic or overseas employment or training or apprenticeship, for the purpose of prostitution, pornography, sexual exploitation, forced labor, slavery, involuntary servitude or debt bondage;

(b) To introduce or match for money, profit, or material, economic or other consideration, any person or, as provided for under Republic Act No. 6955, any Filipino women to a foreign national, for marriage for the purpose of acquiring, buying, offering, selling or trading him/her to engage in prostitution, pornography, sexual exploitation, forced labor, slavery, involuntary servitude or debt bondage;

(c) To offer or contract marriage, real or simulated, for the purpose of acquiring, buying, offering, selling, or trading them to engage in prostitution, pornography, sexual exploitation, forced labor or slavery, involuntary servitude or debt bondage;

(d) To undertake or organize tours and travel plans consisting of tourism packages or activities for the purpose of utilizing and offering persons for prostitution, pornography or sexual exploitation;

(e) To maintain or hire a person to engage in prostitution or pornography;

(f) To adopt or facilitate the adoption of persons for the purpose of prostitution, pornography, sexual exploitation, forced labor, slavery, involuntary servitude or debt bondage;

(g) To recruit, hire, adopt, transport or abduct a person, by means of threat or use of force, fraud deceit, violence, coercion, or intimidation for the purpose of removal or sale of organs of said person; and

(h) To recruit, transport or adopt a child to engage in armed activities in the Philippines or abroad.

=== Republic Act 7610 – Special Protection of Children Against Child Abuse, Exploitation and Discrimination Act ===
Sec. 5. Child Prostitution and Other Sexual Abuse. – Children, whether male or female, who for money, profit, or any other consideration or due to the coercion or influence of any adult, syndicate or group, indulge in sexual intercourse or lascivious conduct, are deemed to be children exploited in prostitution and other sexual abuse.
The penalty of reclusion temporal in its medium period to reclusion perpetua shall be imposed upon the following:

(a) Those who engage in or promote, facilitate or induce child prostitution which include, but are not limited to, the following:

(1) Acting as a procurer of a child prostitute;
(2) Inducing a person to be a client of a child prostitute by means of written or oral advertisements or other similar means;
(3) Taking advantage of influence or relationship to procure a child as prostitute;
(4) Threatening or using violence towards a child to engage him as a prostitute; or
(5) Giving monetary consideration goods or other pecuniary benefit to a child with intent to engage such child in prostitution.

(b) Those who commit the act of sexual intercourse of lascivious conduct with a child exploited in prostitution or subject to other sexual abuse; Provided, That when the victims is under twelve (12) years of age, the perpetrators shall be prosecuted under Article 335, paragraph 3, for rape and Article 336 of Act No. 3815, as amended, the Revised Penal Code, for rape or lascivious conduct, as the case may be: Provided, That the penalty for lascivious conduct when the victim is under twelve (12) years of age shall be reclusion temporal in its medium period; and
(c) Those who derive profit or advantage therefrom, whether as manager or owner of the establishment where the prostitution takes place, or of the sauna, disco, bar, resort, place of entertainment or establishment serving as a cover or which engages in prostitution in addition to the activity for which the license has been issued to said establishment.

Sec. 6. Attempt To Commit Child Prostitution. – There is an attempt to commit child prostitution under Section 5, paragraph (a) hereof when any person who, not being a relative of a child, is found alone with the said child inside the room or cubicle of a house, an inn, hotel, motel, pension house, apartelle or other similar establishments, vessel, vehicle or any other hidden or secluded area under circumstances which would lead a reasonable person to believe that the child is about to be exploited in prostitution and other sexual abuse.
There is also an attempt to commit child prostitution, under paragraph (b) of Section 5 hereof when any person is receiving services from a child in a sauna parlor or bath, massage clinic, health club and other similar establishments. A penalty lower by two (2) degrees than that prescribed for the consummated felony under Section 5 hereof shall be imposed upon the principals of the attempt to commit the crime of child prostitution under this Act, or, in the proper case, under the Revised Penal Code.

=== Republic Act 6955 – Mail-order brides ===
RA 6955 basically declares as unlawful "the practice of matching Filipino women for marriage to foreign nationals on a mail order basis."

=== Republic Act 8042 – Migrant Workers and Overseas Filipinos Act ===
RA 8042 (Long title: An Act to Institute the Policies of Overseas Employment and Establish a Higher Standard of Protection and Promotion of The Welfare of Migrant Workers, Their Families and Overseas Filipinos in Distress, and for Other Purposes.) The act contains provisions which regulate the recruitment of overseas workers; mandate establishment of a mechanism for free legal assistance for victims of illegal recruitment; direct all embassies and consular offices to issue travel advisories or disseminate information on labor and employment conditions, migration realities and other facts; regulate repatriation of workers in ordinary cases and provide a mechanism for repatriation in extraordinary cases; mandate establishment of a Migrant Workers and Other Overseas Filipinos Resource Center to provide social services to returning worker and other migrants; mandate the establishment of a Migrant Workers Loan Guarantee Fund to provide pre-departure and family assistance loans; establishes a legal assistance fund for migrant workers; and other provisions related to Filipino migrant workers. The act, approved on June 7, 1995, mandates that pursuant to the objectives of deregulation the Department of Labor and Employment (DOLE) shall, within a period of five (5) years, phase-out the regulatory functions of the Philippine Overseas Employment Administration (POEA).

=== House Resolution No. 779 ===
House of Representatives of the Philippines Citizen's Battle Against Corruption (CIBAC) Reps. Joel Villanueva and Cinchona Cruz-Gonzales, on September 24, filed House Resolution No. 779 to intensify the fight against human trafficking on all levels, from legislation, policy formulation, enforcement and prosecution, to rehabilitation and support for victims. Villanueva said: "Human trafficking is fast becoming a major transnational crime next only to the illegal drugs trade and illegal arms trade. Most of the victims of trafficking are being exploited as commercial sex workers, forced laborers and even unwilling organ donors. We must consider the reports of the victims that lack of funds and resources are key problems in the full implementation of the Anti-Trafficking of Persons Act, including the necessary support and protection." The National Bureau of Investigation (Philippines) reported "more than 400,000 persons from both government and non-government organizations who are victims of trafficking and almost 100,000 of these victims are children." Cruz-Gonzales said: "As of last year, only a little over a thousand cases were officially reported."

=== Crimes against humanity ===
The United Nations Office on Drugs and Crime has designated human Trafficking as a crime against humanity. In 2002, the International Criminal Court (ICC) was established in The Hague (Netherlands) and the Rome Statute provides for the ICC to have jurisdiction over crimes against humanity. For the purpose of this Statute, "crime against humanity" means any of the following acts when committed as part of a widespread or systematic attack directed against any civilian population, with knowledge of the attack:

(a) Murder;
(b) Extermination;
(c) Enslavement;
(d) Deportation or forcible transfer of population;
(e) Imprisonment or other severe deprivation of physical liberty in violation of fundamental rules of international law;
(f) Torture;
(g) Rape, sexual slavery, enforced prostitution, forced pregnancy, enforced sterilization, or any other form of sexual violence of comparable gravity;
(h) Persecution against any identifiable group or collectivity on political, racial, national, ethnic, cultural, religious, gender as defined in paragraph 3, or other grounds that are universally recognized as impermissible under international law, in connection with any act referred to in this paragraph or any crime within the jurisdiction of the Court;
(i) Enforced disappearance of persons;
(j) The crime of apartheid;
(k) Other inhumane acts of a similar character intentionally causing great suffering, or serious injury to body or to mental or physical health.

== See also ==
- Anti-Trafficking in Persons Act of 2003
- Violence against women in the Philippines
