= Prostitution in the Philippines =

Prostitution in the Philippines is illegal, although somewhat tolerated, with law enforcement being rare with regard to sex workers. Penalties range up to life imprisonment for those involved in trafficking, which is covered by the Anti-Trafficking in Persons Act of 2003. Prostitution is available through bars, karaoke bars (also known as KTVs), massage parlors, brothels (also known as casa), street walkers, and escort services.

The "Young Adult Fertility and Sexuality Study" conducted in 2002 by the University of the Philippines' Population Institute and Demographic Research and Development Foundation found that 19% of young males had paid for sex and 11% had received payment for sexual favors.

In 2013, it was estimated that there were up to 500,000 prostitutes in the Philippines, from a population of roughly 97.5 million. Citing a 2005 study, Senator Pia S. Cayetano asserted in her "Anti-Prostitution Act" (Senate Bill No. 2341 s.2010), that the number of people being exploited in prostitution in the Philippines could be as high as 800,000. The bill was reintroduced in 2013 as Senate Bill No. 3382, and in 2015 as Senate Bill No. 2621.

Japanese prostitutes (Karayuki-san) worked in the Philippines during US rule.

During the Cold War, Japanese businessmen went on sex tourism with Filipino women, Thai women and South Korean women.

== History ==
During the Spanish colonial period, most prostitutes in the Philippines were either working class Filipinas or migrant Japanese from Hong Kong. Prostitution increased due to the forms of gambling introduced by the Spanish, which they used to gain more wealth. Many of the prostitutes' clients were members of the Spanish elite, including priests, as well as Chinese migrants. In some instances members of the Spanish elite tried to stop the practice, but they failed due to corruption. By the last decades of Spanish rule, prostitution in the country had become widespread, and some Spanish governors protected and encouraged the system. During the Philippine Revolution, Filipino revolutionaries sought to reduce prostitution in the country. The native Filipino government introduced the first health clinics for prostitutes, and provided them with aid. However, this aid ended after the United States defeated the First Philippine Republic in the Philippine–American War. During the American Colonial Period, prostitution again became widespread, with some American officers being clients. The American Insular Government of the Philippine Islands encouraged the system, calling it a "military necessity", and even transported prostitutes from other areas such as Davao. After calls from locals and the American government in the US to abolish the system, the American officials stationed in the Philippines "reluctantly" ordered its closure. Prostitution nevertheless continued despite its "official" closure, and was known to reach a peak during every "Manila Carnival period".

== Regions ==
Prostitution caters to both local customers and foreigners. Media attention tends to focus on those areas catering to sex tourism, primarily through bars staffed by bargirls. Cities where there is a high incidence of prostitution are Cebu, Olongapo, Angeles City, Legazpi in Albay, Pasay and Subic Bay in Zambales, with the customers usually foreign businessmen from East Asian and Western nations.

Prostitution in Olongapo City and Angeles was highly prominent during the time of the U.S. military in Subic Bay Naval Base and Clark Air Base, respectively. When Mount Pinatubo, a volcano, erupted in 1991, it destroyed most of Clark Air Base and the United States closed it down in 1992.

Some of the associated prostitution trade closed with it, but when the mayor of Manila, Alfredo Lim, closed down the sex industry area of Ermita in Manila during his first term starting in 1992, many of the businesses moved to Angeles, finding a new customer base among sex tourists.

Other tourist areas such as Cebu have also developed a high-profile prostitution industry.

== Reasons ==
There is no one single reason for the widespread prevalence of prostitution in the Philippines. Poverty is but one reason, as cultural factors and the attitude of people toward money and the social acceptance of prostitution play a major role.

=== Poverty ===
Per the Philippine Statistics Authority, in 2015 the Philippines had a poverty incidence of 26.3%. While this figure has been decreasing over the past few years, this still is one of the reasons why girls and their families turn to prostitution to enable the family to maintain a certain level of lifestyle. A large number of girls who come to Angeles City tend to be provincial, especially from Visayas particular in Cebu, Samar, Leyte, Negros Island and Mindanao, having seen their friends live a better life because of their job in the prostitution industry.

=== U.S. Naval and Air Force bases ===
Clark Air Base was originally established as Fort Stotsenburg in 1898, after the Spanish–American War, renamed Clark field in 1928, and expanded into a major U.S. military installation during the Cold War. Prostitution flourished around the base during the Vietnam War. The U.S. Naval Base Subic Bay, a naval installation since Spanish colonial times, had also grown into a major facility by the 1970s; the main street of Olongapo City had no less than 30 girlie bars and the city acquired the pseudonym "Sin City".

The American authorities supported the testing of the prostitutes for STIs by the local health authorities. Without the licenses issued with these examinations, the prostitutes were prevented from working. Angeles and Olongapo health authorities passed on photographs of sex workers who had failed STI tests to the U.S. bases.

The closure of the U.S. bases in these two places did not change the scenario much—it only changed the clientele. Fields Avenue near Clark (Angeles) continued to grow as a center of the sex tourism industry, under the umbrella of "entertainment" and "hospitality industry". The girlie bars at Olongapo were closed down in a major drive by the then governor Jane Gordon; they merely shifted, however, to the neighbouring town of Barrio Baretto, which contains a series of at least 40 bars which act as prostitution centers.

=== Single mothers ===
Some women join the prostitution industry after they become single unwed mothers. The reason for this is mainly the unpopularity of artificial contraception in the Philippines; the country is overwhelmingly Catholic, and the Catholic Church has opposed birth control measures as "anti-life". More than half of the children born every year in Philippines are illegitimate, and the percentage of illegitimate children is rising at the rate of nearly 2% annually.

== Violence and coercion against prostitutes ==
Women and children involved in prostitution are vulnerable to rape, murder, and AIDS as well as other sexually transmitted diseases.

Surveys of women working as masseuses indicated that 34 percent of them explained their choice of work as necessary to support poor parents, 8% to support siblings, and 28% to support husbands or boyfriends. More than 20% said the job was well paid, but only 2% said it was easy work, and only 2% claimed to enjoy the work.

Over a third reported that they had been subject to violence or harassment, most commonly from the police, but also from city officials and gangsters.

According to a survey conducted by the International Labour Organization, prostitution is one of the most alienating forms of labor. Over 50% of the women surveyed in Philippine massage parlors said they carried out their work "with a heavy heart", and 20% said they were "conscience-stricken because they still considered sex with customers a sin". Interviews with Philippine bar girls revealed that more than half of them felt "nothing" when they had sex with a client, and the remainder said the transactions saddened them.

President Rodrigo Duterte's "war on drugs" since 2016 has been used by some members of the police to harass women in prostitution and extort money or sexual services from them.

== Sex trafficking ==
The Philippines is a source country and, to a lesser extent, a destination and transit country for women and children subjected to sex trafficking. An estimated 10 million Filipinos reside or work abroad and the government processes approximately 2.3 million new or renewed contracts for Filipinos to work overseas each year. A significant number of these migrant workers are subjected to sex trafficking, particularly in the Middle East and Asia, but also in all other regions. Traffickers, typically in partnership with local networks and facilitators, engage in illegal recruitment practices that leave migrant workers vulnerable to trafficking, such as charging excessive fees, producing fraudulent travel and contract documents, and confiscating identity documents. Illegal recruiters use student, intern, exchange program, and tourist visas, as well as travel through other countries to circumvent the Philippine government and destination countries’ legal frameworks for foreign workers. Traffickers also recruit Filipinos already working overseas through fraudulent offers of employment in another country.

Sex trafficking of women and children within the country remains a significant problem. Women and children from indigenous communities and remote areas of the Philippines are the most vulnerable to sex trafficking. Persons displaced due to the conflict in Mindanao, Filipinos returning from bordering countries without documents, and internally displaced persons in typhoon-affected communities are vulnerable to sex trafficking in Metro Manila, Metro Cebu, central and northern Luzon, and urban areas in Mindanao. Sex trafficking also occurs in tourist destinations, such as Boracay, Angeles City, Olongapo, Puerto Galera, and Surigao, where there is a high demand for commercial sex acts. Although the availability of child sex trafficking victims in commercial establishments declined in some urban areas, child sex trafficking remains a pervasive problem, typically abetted by taxi drivers who have knowledge of clandestine locations. In addition, young Filipino girls and boys are increasingly induced to perform sex acts for live internet broadcast to paying foreigners in other countries; this typically occurs in private residences or small internet cafes, and may be facilitated by victims’ family members and neighbors. NGOs report high numbers of child sex tourists in the Philippines, many of whom are citizens of Australia, Japan, the United States, Canada, and countries in Europe; Filipino men also purchase commercial sex acts from child trafficking victims. Organized crime syndicates allegedly transport sex trafficking victims from China to the Philippines. Sex trafficking victims from China only serve Chinese male clients who visit or work at those offshore gaming operators according to the Philippines National Bureau of Investigation, the pimps and clients of the prostitutes being both Chinese men residing in the Philippines, not local Filipino men or other foreigners in the Philippines.

Officials, including those in diplomatic missions, law enforcement agencies, and other government entities, allegedly have been complicit in trafficking or allowed traffickers to operate with impunity. Reports in previous years asserted police conduct indiscriminate or fake raids on commercial sex establishments to extort money from managers, clients, and victims.

The United States Department of State Office to Monitor and Combat Trafficking in Persons ranks the Philippines as a 'Tier 1' country.

== See also ==
- Commercial sexual exploitation of children
- Prostitution in Japan
- Prostitution in Thailand
- Prostitution in India
- Prostitution in Cambodia
- Prostitution in Indonesia
