= Svay Pak =

Urban commune in Cambodia

Svay Pak ស្វាយប៉ាក
- Urban commune
- Location within Cambodia Location within Southeast Asia
- Coordinates: 11.646719°N 104.871515°E
- Country: Cambodia
- Province: Phnom Penh
- District: Russey Keo

Area
  - Total: 5.675 km^{2} (2.191 sq mi)

Population (2019)
  - Total: 19,042
  - Density: 3,355/km^{2} (8,690/sq mi)

Svay Pak (/swaɪ ˈpɑːk/; Khmer: ស្វាយប៉ាក; also called Kilometer 11 and K-11) is an urban commune of overseas Vietnamese in Cambodia, north of Phnom Penh. The commune has been renowned as a destination for adult and child prostitution, and while the latter has been cracked down upon, its prevalence as of 2017 was disputed.

== Geography ==
Svay Pak is located eleven or twelve kilometres (6.8 or 7.5 mi) north of the Cambodian capital of Phnom Penh, in the district of Russey Keo, at coordinates 11.646719°N 104.871515°E. As of December 2021, the urban commune had a square footage of 5.675 square kilometres (2.191 sq mi); in January 2003, Svay Pak had a diameter of 150 metres (490 ft).

== History ==
The afternoon of 20 August 1995 saw a fire sweep through Svay Pak. Approximately 300 houses and a Médecins Sans Frontières (MSF) clinic were burnt down, but the only loss of life was a local dog. Non-governmental organizations Concern and MSF committed to helping residents (the latter promised to rebuild its clinic) alongside local philanthropists. While some locals accused the fire brigade of extorting them for firefighting services, local official Hou Samon said that the village roads were too narrow to accommodate the fire engine; Samon said that the local government planned "to discuss letting the home and brothel-owners resettle in the same area, but first all the roads would have to be widened."

Historical population
Year	Pop.	±% p.a.
1998	12,197	—
2008	16,446	+3.03%
2019	19,042	+1.34%

In 2000, the only industry in Svay Pak other than prostitution (and the support thereof) was fishing. As of 2004, the commune's residents were Vietnamese Cambodians, and those not working in the prostitution industry had "tenuous citizenship status". The population in 2008 was 16446 people, a 3.03% increase from 1998's population of 12197. By 2019, the population was 19042, a 1.3% increase in eleven years. In late 2019, Svay Pak had one of the four primary schools (Vietnamese: Trường tiểu học Svay Pak, lit. 'Svay Pak Primary School') built by the Khmer-Vietnam Association for Vietnamese populations living in Cambodia. After a November 2019 fire, the Vietnamese embassy in Phnom Penh, local businesses, and philanthropists contributed 150,000,000 Vietnamese đồng to rebuild houses for affected Vietnamese Cambodians in Svay Pak.

== Culture ==
The Vietnamese expats in Svay Pak are unique as part of neither Cambodian society nor the Vietnamese diaspora. They are served by the Mary Magdalene Church, a local Catholic church established in 1998. In 2006, the church ran a school to assist second-generation Vietnamese Cambodians in assimilating (such as by teaching Khmer).

== Sex work ==
Prostitution has been prevalent in Svay Pak since at least 1995, and was once "one of the most notorious places in the world for sex slavery."

=== Adult prostitution ===
Locals reported that brothels first opened in 1985, but they proliferated in the years following the Cambodian–Vietnamese War, in the presence of the United Nations Transitional Authority in Cambodia's peacekeeping forces. Post-war, Svay Pak's political corruption and instability led to local authorities extorting brothel owners, while the sex workers themselves "experienced raids, arrests, and rape from armed military and civil police forces operating under loose governmental control." Furthermore, managers in Svay Pak subverted the Cambodian law requiring 100% condom-use for brothels, resulting in a 19% rate of HIV for workers in 2000. Though prostitution in Cambodia was not illegal in 2004, other factors contributed to "de facto criminalization" of the industry.

In March 1999, there were about 300 migrant sex workers in 25 brothels. In May 2000, there were 24 brothels employing approximately 320 women on two main Svay Pak streets. By March 2002, as a result of decreasing demand, there were only 17 brothels and around 279 sex workers. Clients included local Vietnamese, Khmer, Chinese, Japanese, Australians, North Americans, and Europeans. The Southern Vietnamese teens and 20-somethings working in these brothels followed established migration routes into Svay Pak after intermediaries, sometimes the girls' and women's families, were paid US$50–3,000 (equivalent to about $85–5,114 in 2025). Servicing 14 clients per week, workers could repay this debt in 6–24 months, resulting in high turnover—half of Svay Pak's sex workers had been there for six months of less.

The Phnom Penh Post reported that in 2005 the Cambodian government shut down the commune for a film production and simultaneously excised the brothels; by 2006, "prostitutes no longer operate[d] with impunity."

=== Child prostitution ===
Gary Haugen of International Justice Mission (IJM) wrote that in 2000, Svay Pak was a lawless commune where "tiny, elementary-school-age girls" were prostituted to the public in broad daylight. One or more girls shared individual 6-by-8-foot (1.8 m × 2.4 m) cubicles where they served Western child-sex tourists.

In 2002, child prostitution was bustling in Svay Pak, driven by child sex tourism from the Western world after child prostitution in Thailand was cracked-down upon. The Daily Telegraph supposed that any sex tourists in Svay Pak were there for the children, for if "a man wants an older girl then there are plenty on offer in the brothels and bars of Phnom Penh." The majority of the children were overseas Vietnamese, sold into prostitution by destitute families. Between the ages of six and 13, girls' virginity was sold for "hundreds of dollars"; prostituted repeatedly, the price diminished until reaching a low of £3 or US$4.5 (equivalent to £5.56 or $8.66 in 2025). At the turn of the 21st century, clients of child prostitution in Svay Pak expressed little fear of authorities because the police were compensated by the brothels; foreigners were only arrested if "a bribe is missed, or an example needs to be made of someone". In 2003, Svay Pak saw up to 50 clients per night for child prostitution.

After two years of pressure from Women's Affairs Minister Mu Sochua, women's rights groups, and the Association of Southeast Asian Nations, action was taken on the problem of child prostitution on Svay Pak. On 22 January 2003, Svay Pak's child brothels were raided by police. Dozens of pimps and clients were present during the raid, but none were arrested; the raid was "widely advertised in advance", and all but a few of the children had been moved to the towns of Siem Reap and Sihanoukville beforehand. By 29 January, Svay Pak was described as "a ghost town" by the Asian Human Rights Commission; by March, however, a joint Dateline NBC–IJM investigation found that Svay Pak was "the place to go if you're looking for the youngest girls." That year, IJM founder Gary Haugen worked with Cambodian officials to mount an operation to rescue children and arrest perpetrators; despite problems arising from police bribery, "a dozen suspected pimps and madams are in custody, and 37 girls [were] rescued, many under the age of 10." Upon returning to Svay Pak six months later, Dateline members were again offered prostituted children; Minister Sochua was not surprised by the reversion, blaming "extreme poverty and widespread corruption".

When Dateline followed-up in 2008, the show reported that "Svay Pak is a changed place. […] Many of the brothels have closed their doors and moved out of town, replaced by restaurants, a phone store, even a children's community center serving children, some of the same children who were once exploited here." However, in 2011, CNN reported that while pimps no longer swarmed every foreign man who came into town, and children were not to be seen prostituting themselves from streetside windows, the child-sex industry remained; volunteers with Agape International Missions (AIM) were still rescuing girls from the now-underground trade. In 2011, a documentary was made about the problem in Svay Pak; named The Pink Room after a special room for the virgin girls, the film claimed that the child prostitution remained under a new veneer of legitimate businesses like bars or coffeehouses.

In May 2015, The Washington Post published an op-ed by Holly Burkhalter, the "vice president of government relations and advocacy for [IJM]." Burkhalter pushed back against the narrative that IJM and Dateline exposed in 2003, and proclaimed that Cambodian law-enforcement had rid the nation of child sex tourism (CST) in the face of international embarrassment and US Ambassador Charles A. Ray's threat of discontinuing United States foreign aid. Burkhalter detailed government efforts and statistics to back-up her claims of CST eradication. Thirteen days later, the Post published a contrasting op-ed by AIM's Donald J. Brewster. Writing from Svay Pak, Brewster claimed that the commune's criminals have simply adapted to the government's efforts, and continued to prostitute children aged 6–16. Agape International, Brewster wrote, had rescued 32 children from sex-trafficking in the preceding year, and "[t]he highest levels of Cambodia's anti-trafficking police agree" with his evaluation of the continuing crime in Svay Pak.

ABC News traveled to Svay Pak in 2017 and found much the same situation as described by Brewster two years prior: though the number of children in sex work has dropped to 1–2% from 35% of those so working, Western men still solicited preteens for sex and the local SWAT equivalent continued to raid underage brothels. Later that year, CNN collaborated with AIM for an article that caught-up with a young woman (Sephak) who was prostituted out of Svay Pak as a child. In response to these stories, Cambodian Prime Minister Hun Sen accused the non-governmental organization of exaggerating the sex trafficking in Svay Pak, announced a police investigation into AIM, demanded that US ambassador William A. Heidt do the same, and ordered—with "the force of law"—the charity group to leave Cambodia. Cambodian official Huy Vannak suggested that the government reaction against AIM may have stemmed from CNN accidentally implying that Sephak was ethnically Cambodian as opposed to being overseas Vietnamese (CNN issued a clarification). Hun Sen relented after locals spoke up in favor of the group's work and Brewster apologized for their faux pas; though Brewster later returned to California, AIM was still providing services in Svay Pak as of March 2021.

After interviewing locals, clergy, and visiting workers, the Southeast Asia Globe said in March 2021 that "all signs suggest that the open trade practiced in the village […] has been all but stomped out". Furthermore, both the illegal drug trade and tensions between the different ethnic groups have lessened over recent years. Locals also reported that the commune's once-earned reputation leads to their discrimination outside of town. In June 2022, a business in Svay Pak was raided by police, and found to be have an underage girl offering sexual services.
