= Voice of the Free =

Non-government organization in the Philippines

Voice of the Free (VF) is a philanthropic NGO in the Philippines established in 1991. VF works for the welfare of marginalized migrants, especially those working in the invisible and informal sectors. The organization targets issues of domestic work, child labor, and human trafficking, especially of women and children.

== Overview ==
VF is licensed and accredited by the Department of Social Welfare and Development to provide "residential care and community-based programs and services for women and children in especially difficult circumstances".

It is mostly known for its documented work with domestic workers in the Philippines, especially in pushing for the Domestic Workers Bill or the Kasambahay Law. In addition, it provides services to trafficking victims by managing Halfway Houses constructed by the Philippine Ports Authority and the Manila International Airport Authority.

== History ==
The organisation was founded in 1991 by Maria Cecilia Flores-Obanda as the Visayan Forum Foundation Inc. (VFF), a nonprofit organization. VFF is located in Quezon city and has rescued and helped more than 60,000 victims and potential victims of trafficking.

The Visayan Forum now has its own national office in Manila and a network of over 70 staff workers, six regional offices, and seven project areas.

== National and International Efforts in Mobilizing Social Partners ==
- Philippine and Southeast Asian Secretariat, Global March against Child Labor.
- Convenor, Task Force on Child Domestic Workers in Asia.
- Convenor, Multi-Sectoral Network against Trafficking in Persons (MSNAT).
- Convenor, Anti-Trafficking Task Forces at the Ports.
- Vice-chair, Philippine NGO Coalition on the UNCRC.
- Member, ILO Convention 182 National Monitoring Team.
- Member, National Steering Committee of UNICEF's Sixth Country Program for Children.

== Human trafficking ==
Visayan Forum Foundation has been involved in helping women and children trafficked into prostitution by providing support, education, housing, and legal advice.

Visayan Forum Foundation has established that most of the children and young women trafficked to Manila from rural areas are in search of work and are assured jobs as domestic workers, but in a significant number of cases end up in the sex trade. Statistics provided by the Visayan Forum Foundation show that most victims are between 12 and 22 years old.

The Visayan Forum works with the Philippine Coast Guard, the government's Port Authority, and shipping company Aboitez to monitor arriving boats in the main ports, looking for possible traffickers traveling with groups of children.

The organization has operations in four main ports serving Manila, and says it rescues between 20 and 60 children a week.

=== Regional Centers ===
Metro Manila, Batangas, Bacolod, Davao, Sorsogon.

=== Other Project Areas ===
NCR, Batangas, Sorsogon, Cebu, Iloilo, Negros Occidental, Negros Oriental, Davao, Southern Leyte, Samar, Surigao, and Zamboanga.

== Awards ==
Maria Cecilia Flores-Oebanda of the Visayan Forum Foundation is the first person to win the Iqbal Masih Award for the Elimination of Child Labor, a new honor bestowed by the U.S. Department of Labor.

Maria Cecilia Flores-Oebanda was presented with the award by Kristie Kenny, the U.S. ambassador to the Philippines.

In 2005, Maria Cecilia Flores-Oebanda of the Visayan Forum Foundation received the Anti-Slavery Award from Anti-Slavery International, the world's oldest human rights organization.

In 2009, the Visayan Forum Foundation was awarded the Eduardo Aboitiz Award for Outstanding Institution.

== Department of Justice Resolution ==
On July 29, 2016 the Department of Justice issued a resolution dismissing and clearing Visayan Forum Foundation Officers and key staff on charges of Estafa through Falsification of Commercial documents filed by the NBI in connection with a USAID grant.

The four-page decision signed on July 29, 2016, by Senior Assistant State Prosecutor Merba A. Waga, Senior Deputy State Prosecutor Theodore M. Villanueva, and approved by Prosecutor General Claro A. Arellano, stated that there was insufficient evidence to warrant any further investigation.

In August 2012, the NBI probed the foundation for allegedly falsifying documents to hide the misuse of at least $2.1 Million USAID grant for the organization's pioneering anti-trafficking work.

"I'm thankful to DOJ that after more than four years of patiently and humbly waiting to allow the work of the justice system to run its course, we can put this allegation behind us. We thank our partners who stood with us during those difficult times. We can now move forward and focus our positive energies on fulfilling our greater mission. As of now there are 50 victims and survivors of human trafficking as young as 2 years old under our care in the center of Visayan Forum, and they are most important to us," said Ma. Cecilia Flores-Oebanda, Visayan Forum Founding President.

According to the resolution, "thus, it is clear that the alleged falsified documents which were purportedly used as supporting documents to liquidate the funds they claimed VFFI received from the USAID and made the basis of their complaint cannot support the charges filed against the herein respondents. There is no gainsaying that the complaint filed against the herein respondents has no leg to stand on."
