= Violence against prostitutes =

Violence against prostitutes include violent and harmful acts, both physical or psychological, against individuals engaging in prostitution. It occurs worldwide, with the victims of such acts of violence being predominantly women. In extreme cases, violent acts have led to their murder while in their workplace.

== Prevalence ==
Women working in prostitution experience higher levels of violence against them than the general population of women. A long-term study published in 2004 estimated the homicide rate for active female prostitutes who had worked in Colorado Springs from 1967 through 1999 to be 204 per 100,000 person-years. The overwhelming majority of the 1,969 women in the study were street prostitutes. Only 126 worked in massage parlors, and most of these women were also prostituted on the streets.

Although the Colorado Springs prostitutes appeared to be representative of all US prostitutes in terms of prevalence and number of sexual partners, and while they worked as prostitutes (and died) in many parts of the country, prostitutes elsewhere might have different mortality rates and profiles. This homicide figure is considerably higher than that for the next riskiest occupations in the United States during the 1980s (4 per 100,000 for female liquor store workers and 29 per 100,000 for male taxicab drivers). The prevalence of violence against prostitutes varies by location. A study of prostituted women and girls in Vancouver, British Columbia, Canada over the age of 14 who used illicit drugs other than marijuana found that 57% of prostitutes experienced some form of sex-based violence over an 18-month period. A study of 1,000 female (both cisgender and transgender) prostitutes in Phnom Penh, Cambodia, found 93% of women surveyed had been the victim of rape in the past year.

== Types of violence ==
=== Physical ===
Physical violence is defined by World Health Organization as "the intentional use of physical force or power, threatened or actual, against oneself, another person, or against a group or community, which either results in or has a high likelihood of resulting in injury, death, psychological harm, maldevelopment, or deprivation". Physical violence is more commonly experienced by outdoor prostitutes with 47% of prostitutes working outdoors reporting being kicked, punched, or slapped in one study. In a study of prostitutes working in San Francisco, 82% of participants reported having experienced some type of physical violence since entering prostitution, with 55% of these assaults being committed by a client. A different study found a slightly lower rate with 74% of sex-workers reported experiencing some form of physical abuse in their lifetime. The general consensus among most studies regarding violence against prostitutes is that rates of physical violence against prostitutes is extremely high, particularly among women who experience higher rates of physical violence than their male counterparts.

=== Psychological ===
Psychological abuse, also referred to as mental abuse or emotional abuse is characterized by a person subjecting or exposing another to behavior that may result in psychological trauma, including anxiety, chronic depression, or post-traumatic stress disorder (PTSD). The United Nations Population Fund says that this type of violence "includes, but is not limited to, being insulted (e.g. called derogatory names) or made to feel bad about oneself; being humiliated or belittled in front of other people; being threatened with loss of custody of one's children; being confined or isolated from family or friends; being threatened with harm to oneself or someone one cares about; repeated shouting, inducing fear through intimidating words or gestures; controlling behavior; and the destruction of possessions."

There are certain types of psychological or emotional abuse that sex workers are more prone to such as denial of basic needs, forced drug or alcohol consumption, and being arrested for carrying condoms to name a few. Women working in prostitution are especially vulnerable to psychological abuse, particularly verbal abuse, because many customers and other members of society view them as "whores" or as generally undesirable women. Often verbal abuse will occur either while the service is being given, or after it has been given and the customer is not satisfied. In both these cases, verbal abuse can be a precursor to sexual violence from the client. In one study, 78% of sex-workers reported having experienced emotional or psychological abuse in their lifetime.

=== Sexual ===
Sexual violence is any sexual act or attempt to obtain a sexual act by violence or coercion, unwanted sexual comments or advances, acts to traffic a person or acts directed against a person's sexuality, regardless of the relationship to the victim. The risks of sexual abuse are overall lower than the risks of physical abuse, with the exception of indoor prostitutes who report a higher rate of rape or attempted rape than any one type of physical violence. Rates of sexual assault and rape are higher among women (including transgender women) than among men, though the overall rate is high with one study finding that 68% of respondents had been raped since entering prostitution. In another study, 44% of sex-workers reported having experienced sexual abuse in their lifetime. These high levels of sexual violence suffered by sex workers have very traumatic effects on the men and women working as prostitutes. High levels of rape and other forms of sexual violence while working as a prostitute have been linked to higher levels of PTSD.

== Contributing factors ==
Studies have shown that younger prostitutes tend to experience more client violence than their older colleagues. Furthermore, cisgender and transgender female sex workers are also more likely to experience violence committed by a client than their male prostitute counterparts.

=== Social stigmas: transgender sex workers ===
As represented through a study on transgender sex workers, trans women, especially those of color, tend to endure higher rates of violence than that of cisgender women due to discriminations and intersectional factors. There are a variety of contributing factors, including the social stigmas surrounding transgender women that push them into sex work as a means of survival; this includes high unemployment rates typically due to legalized discriminations, a lack of education or career opportunities, and mental health issues resulting from transphobic experiences from adolescence through adulthood. It is shown in one study that transgender women chose to remain in sex work despite the risks of violence and HIV contraction as a means to gain the social and economic support that society typically fails to provide. This is specifically seen with black transgender women who are paid less for sex work, and are therefore pushed to see more clients, increasing their chances of exposure to violence.

Although transgender sex workers are able to attain their own sense of community, they are still faced with discrimination which often represents itself in violence on the streets. On top of the typical risk of rape and robbery that prostitutes face by their clients, transgender prostitutes face the additional burden of transphobic acts of violence and harassment. One study includes 48 transgender women of color from San Francisco who share their experiences with violence during sex work—one participant recalls: "The police see you on the sidewalk, they will snatch your hair off your head, if you have on a wig and they will call you 'boy', loud, so everybody can hear over the speaker phone" [p. 774]. Another participant describes being forced into performing oral sex on an officer in order to escape the threat of arrest. This transphobic violence is also perpetuated by clients, as shown through another participant who describes the death of her friend, who was killed and dismembered by a client who originally believed she was a cisgender woman.

=== Legal vs. illegal sex work ===
Laws prohibiting prostitution can make it difficult for the men and women engaging in prostitution to report any violence they may experience while on the "job". Often transactions or arrangements to meet up with clients must be made in secret in places where prostitution is illegal. The decriminalization of sex work in New Zealand has shown that violence is reduced when sex workers are not forced to work alone, or in isolated places. Sex work was always legal in New Zealand but decriminalization removed laws that increased danger.

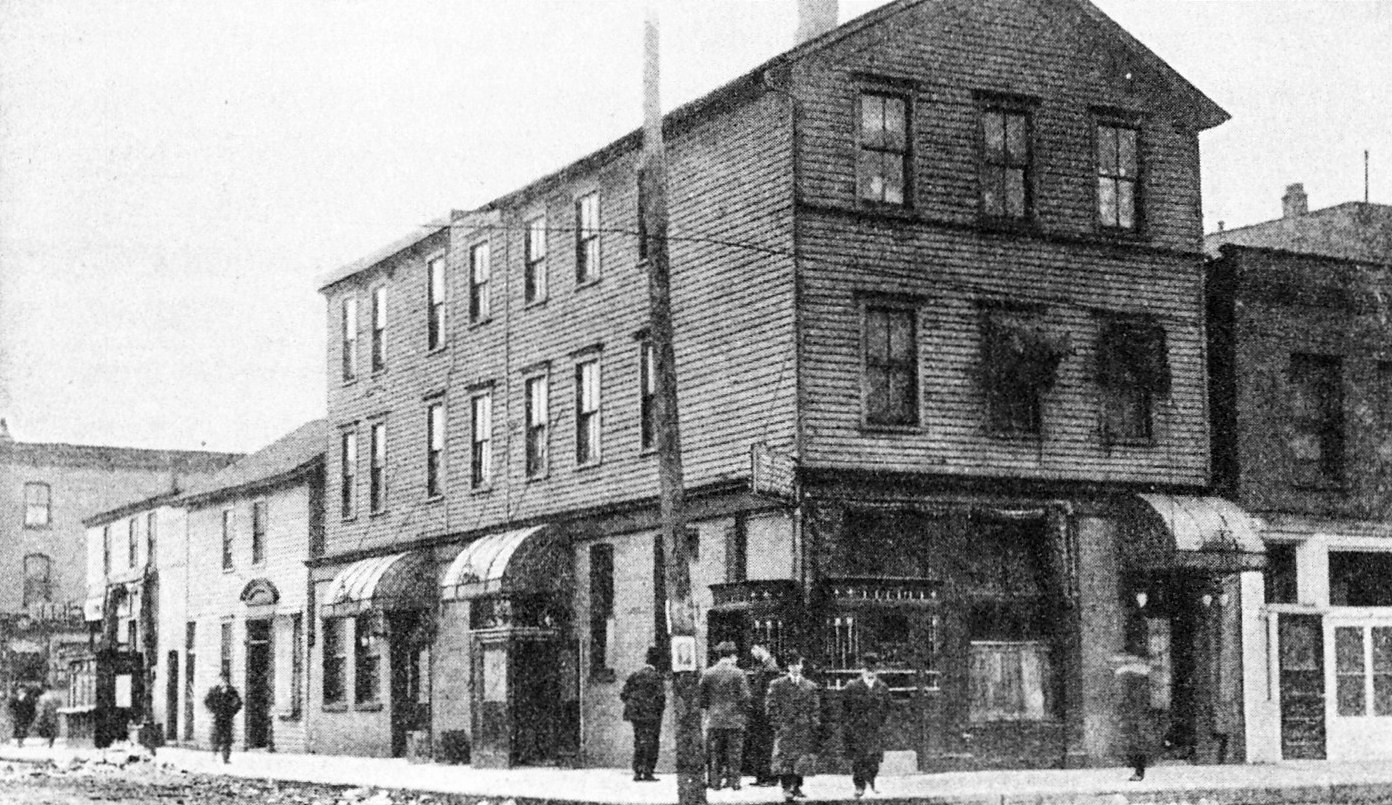
"The Paris" brothel in Chicago c. 1911

=== Indoor vs. outdoor working environment ===
There are substantial differences in rates of victimization between street prostitutes and indoor sex workers who work as call girls, or in brothels and massage parlors. Women who work legally in licensed brothels are much less likely to be victimized, as are indoor workers in countries where sex work is legal. A 1999 study of 240 prostitutes found that half of sex-workers working outside faced some type of violence in the past six months, compared to a quarter of those working indoors.

Experiences of client violence by prostitutes working indoors or outdoors. Values are numbers (percentages) of prostitutes unless stated otherwise
Experiences with Violence	Outdoors (n=115)	Indoors (n=125)
Ever experienced client violence	93 (81)	60 (48)
Experienced violence in past six months	58 (50)	32 (26)
Types of Violence Ever Experienced:		
Slapped, kicked, punched	54 (47)	17 (14)
Threatened with physical violence	45 (39)	18 (14)
Robbery	42 (37)	12 (10)
Attempted robbery	30 (26)	6 (5)
Beaten	31 (27)	1 (1)
Threatened with a weapon	28 (24)	8 (6)
Held against will	29 (25)	19 (15)
Attempted rape (vaginal or anal)	32 (28)	21 (17)
Strangulation	23 (20)	7 (6)
Kidnapped	23 (20)	3 (2)
Forced to give a client oral sex	20 (17)	4 (3)
Raped (vaginal)	25 (22)	2 (2)
Attempted kidnap	14 (12)	1 (1)
Slashed or stabbed	8 (7)	----
Raped (anal)	6 (5)	8 (6)
Reported at least one incident of client violence to police	41/93 (44)	11/60 (18)

== Perpetrators ==
=== Violent clients, pimps and police officers ===
Perpetrators may include violent clients and pimps. Clients often attempt to maintain a power balance that favors them over the prostitutes. This is often done through different methods of violence such as sexual, emotional, and physical. Though pimps may be perpetrators of violence against sex workers with 53% of sex workers in one study reporting that violence at the hands of pimps is a major problem, 33% of subjects interviewed in that same study reported that the main benefit to having a pimp is the protection from potential assault.

Because of the illegality of sex work in many parts of the world, sex workers often have to service clients in discreet and isolated spaces where they are less likely to get caught by the police. Because of this isolation, sex workers are made more vulnerable to attacks by their clients. According to a study conducted on one hundred and thirty people working in San Francisco as street sex workers, 82% had been physically assaulted, 83% had been threatened with a weapon and 68% had been raped while working as prostitutes.

In jurisdictions where sex work is illegal, sex workers are not able to report violence done against them in fear of being arrested themselves. In certain states anti-prostitution mandates carry a minimum sentence and can increase to felony charge after multiple arrests, which leads to difficulty finding housing and employment, and disqualification for welfare benefits. Additionally sex workers may be registered as sex offenders, or face deportation if they have precarious migratory or citizenship status.

Because of the stigma that exists around sex work, police are less likely to investigate attacks on sex workers. As one sex worker in South Africa reports, "to gather evidence of a crime against a sex worker, they have to first take it seriously"; "If we go to the police to report abuse, we're made fun of, we're told 'you deserve it.' They chase you away," notes another sex worker.

Police officers themselves are common perpetrators of violence against prostitutes. A study of sex-workers in Phnom Penh, Cambodia found that half of the women had been beaten by police and about a third had been gang-raped by police. "In South Africa, where sex work has been illegal since the former apartheid regime criminalized it in 1957, police officers often fine sex workers inordinate sums of money and pocket the cash, resulting in a pattern of economic extortion of sex workers by state agents."

=== Serial killers ===
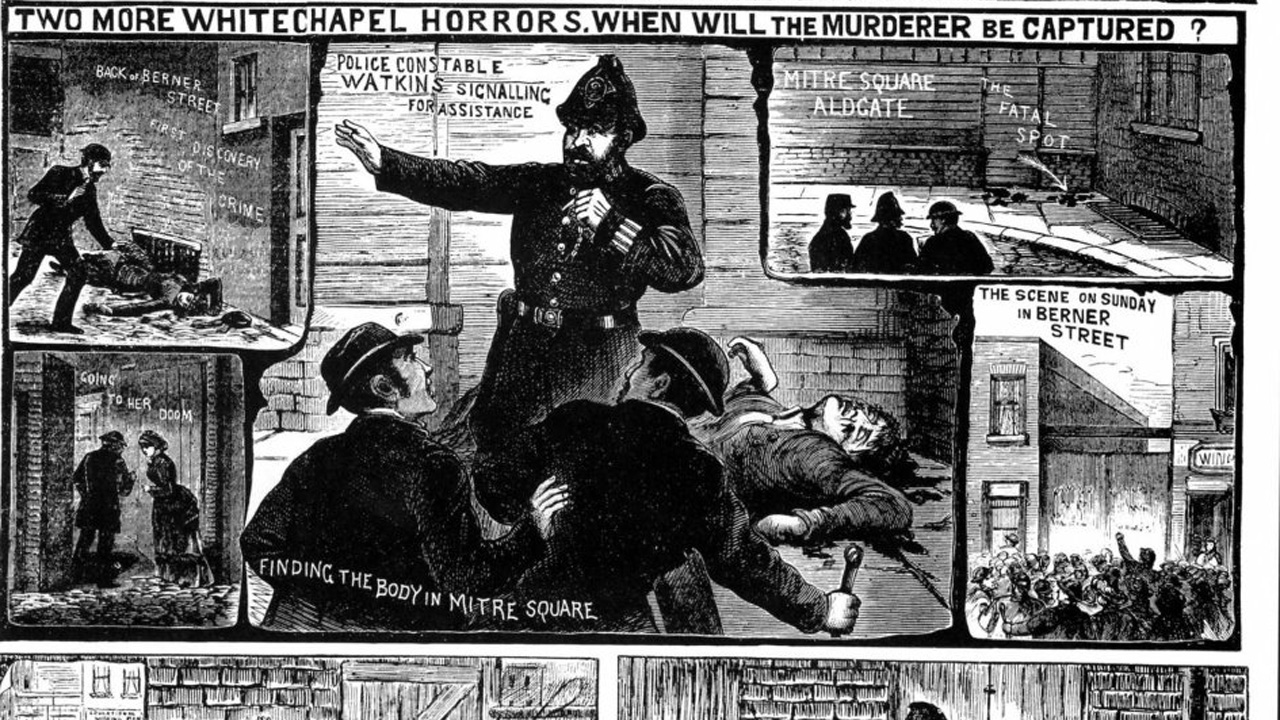
Jack the Ripper's victims (The Illustrated Police News, 1888)

Sex workers (particularly those engaging in street prostitution) are also sometimes targeted by serial killers, who may consider them easy targets and less likely to be missed, or who use the religious and social stigma associated with sex workers as justification for their murder.

The unidentified serial killer known as Jack the Ripper killed at least five sex workers in London in 1888. Due to the frequent murders of prostitutes at that time and place, however, it is difficult to be certain of the number killed by Jack the Ripper. These particular murders are distinguished from other murders of sex workers during the same time period due to the post-mortem mutilations that occurred, and it is for that reason that other murders of prostitutes are not usually attributed to the Ripper, or are disputed.

Peter Sutcliffe (a.k.a. the Yorkshire Ripper) murdered 13 women, some of whom were sex workers, from 1975 to 1980 in Northern England.

Gary Ridgway (a.k.a. the Green River Killer) confessed to killing 48 sex workers from 1982 to 1998, making him one of the most prolific serial killers in U.S. history.

Robert Hansen murdered between 15 and 21 sex workers, near Anchorage, Alaska, between 1980 and 1983.

Joel Rifkin confessed to killing 17 sex workers in the New York area between 1989 and 1993, without there having been a missing persons report filed on any of the women during that time.

Jeffrey Dahmer killed gay male sex workers in the Milwaukee area between 1978 and 1991

Robert Pickton, a Canadian who lived near Vancouver, made headlines after the remains of numerous missing sex workers were found on his family farm. He has now been convicted of the murders of six women who went missing from Vancouver's Downtown Eastside, and is suspected by police of killing at least twenty more (though no charges have been filed in relation to their deaths). In December 2007 he was sentenced to life in prison, with no possibility of parole for 25 years.

In December 2006, Steve Wright murdered five sex workers in Ipswich, England (see Ipswich serial murders).

Believed to have begun in 1996, the Long Island Serial Killer killed between 10 and 16 women in the sex work profession. The killings seemed to have stopped in 2011, and a suspect was apprehended in 2023.

== Efforts to combat violence ==
Most efforts to advocate for prostitutes have focused on prevention of the spread of AIDS/HIV+ among the general population rather than focusing on how certain policies would benefit the prostitutes themselves. This focus has neglected many of the issues of violence facing sex workers. Recently, however, there has been an effort to eradicate violence against prostitutes from a wider perspective. The United Nations Population Fund (UNPF), in conjunction with several other organizations, recommends community empowerment, led by sex workers, as a way to combat violence against sex-workers. UNPF also advocates for changing perceptions to view sex work as work, rather than an illegal activity. One issue facing efforts to prevent violence against prostitutes is that there is a low level of reporting violence among prostitutes. A study of female sex-workers in India found that 54% of female sex-workers do not report violence committed against them, and only 36% shared their experience with NGOs or a peer or family member.

=== By sex workers ===
Because of the increased risk of violence associated with working in sex work, many prostitutes have begun adopting their own personal policies to reduce the likelihood of becoming the victims of violence. A study by Maureen A. Norton-Hawk found that "40% of sex workers have a policy of refusing to provide services in an alley, 54% refuse to provide services in a drug house, and 68% refuse to provide services in an abandoned building." Often, sex workers must rely on themselves or each other for support in ending violence as many campaigns to end violence against women ignore the needs of sex workers.

=== Government policy ===
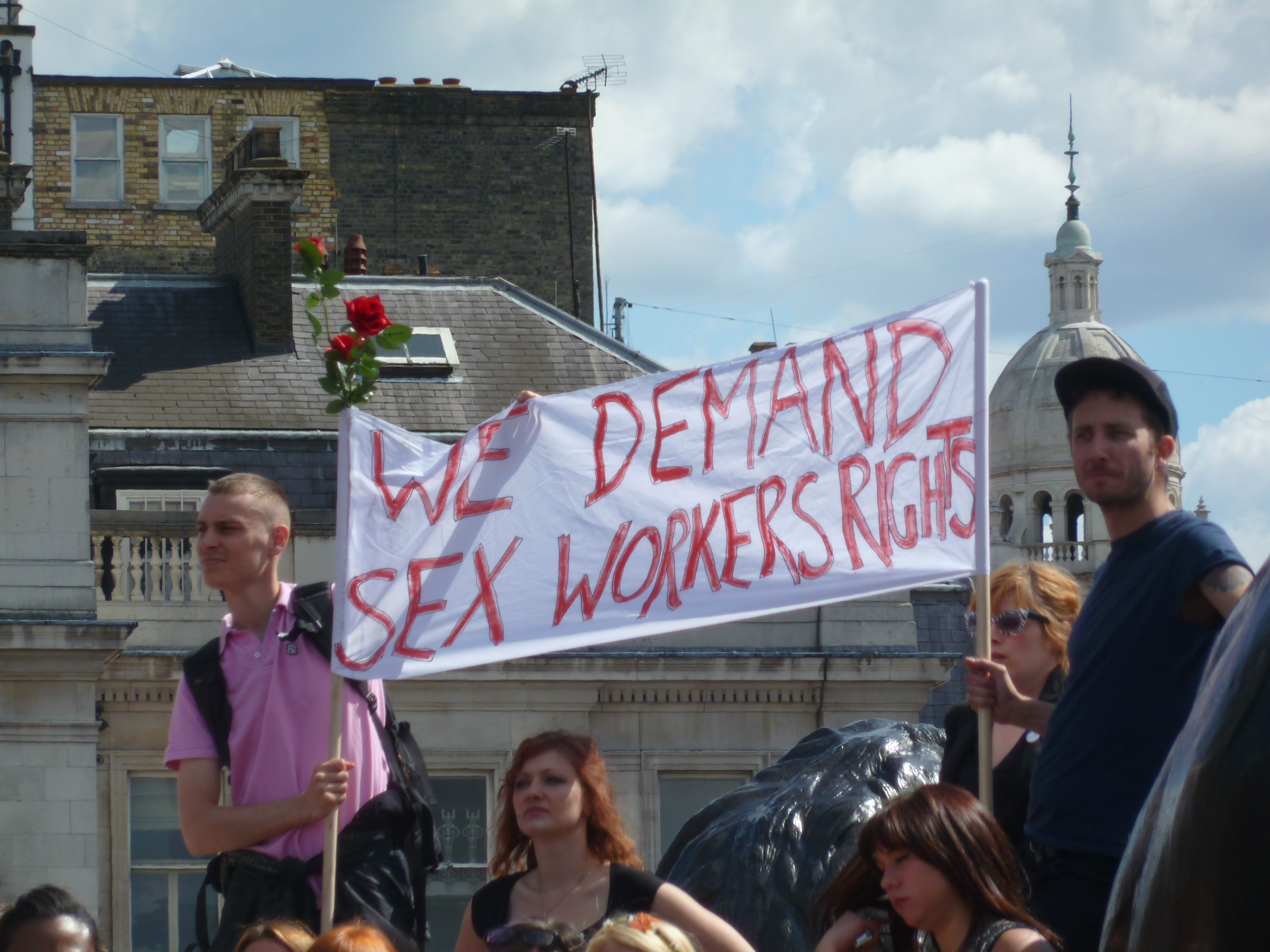
Sex Workers' Rights demonstration at London SlutWalk 2011

UN Women supports the decriminalization of sex work in order to protect sex-workers from violence and abuse and encourages the criminalization of forms of violence, coercion and exploitation in sex work. Currently, however, the United States of America requires that all countries it gives aid to for AIDS/HIV+ prevention and relief agree to an "anti-prostitution pledge" that dictates that the country receiving aid must adopt policy that treats sex work and prostitution the same as sex trafficking. This policy has resulted in inadequate attention being paid to the health needs of prostitutes and limits the ability of the government to address the specific needs that sex workers have. Furthermore, in the United States, many states have mandatory minimum sentencing laws that require judges to give anyone convicted of prostitution a mandatory minimum prison sentence. This can, in turn, make it less likely that prostitutes take legal action against the perpetrators of violence against them because doing so could be risking jail time.

One possible policy option that the Netherlands has done would be to designate specific places for sex workers and clients to meet up and arrange and engage in sexual activities. This would provide a safe and secure place for sexual services to be sold without having to remain in private which can be a risk factor for violence against prostitutes. Some organizations have even suggested forming support groups composed of sex workers in the area as a way to give sex workers the support they often lack.

== See also ==
- International Day to End Violence Against Sex Workers
- Sex workers' rights
- Sex Workers' Rights Movement
- Violence against women
