= Ocean Robbins =

Canadian entrepreneur and author

- Born: November 12, 1973 (age 52); Salt Spring Island, BC, Canada
- Occupations: CEO; author
- Known for: 31 Day Food Revolution, 2019
- Title: Co-founder, CEO of Food Revolution Network, Inc.
- Relatives: Irv Robbins (grandfather); Burt Baskin (great uncle); Richard Baskin (cousin)
- Website: www.oceanrobbins.com

Ocean Robbins (born November 12, 1973) is an American entrepreneur and author, best known for his role as the co-founder of Food Revolution Network, Inc. This California-based company is dedicated to advocating for a Whole-food, plant-based diet.

== Biography ==
Robbins was born to John Robbins, author of Diet for a New America. He is the grandson of Baskin-Robbins cofounder Irvine Robbins. He is Jewish and stating that - - "Each of my eight great grandparents were Jews in Eastern Europe who fled persecution." Robbins spent much of his early life advocating environmental change. At the age of 15, he co-founded the Creating our Future speaking tour, which aimed to empower students for environmental change and included presentations at the United Nations. In 1990, Robbins founded the non-profit organization Youth for Environmental Sanity (YES!) to continue his mission of advocating for sustainability and social justice. He directed the organization until 2010. Additionally, in 2012, Robbins co-founded Food Revolution Network alongside his father. Robbins has also served as adjunct professor in the Peace Studies department at Chapman University.

His book 31-Day Food Revolution debuted as a best seller on WSJ and USA Today.

== Personal life ==
Ocean and his wife Michele are raising twin special needs boys.

== Bibliography ==
- Robbins, Ocean (2019). 31-Day Food Revolution: Heal Your Body, Feel Great, and Transform Your World. Grand Central Publishing. ISBN 978-1538746257.
- Robbins, Ocean (2013). Voices of the Food Revolution: You Can Heal Your Body and Your World with Food. Conari Press. ISBN 978-1573246248.
