= Veronica Monet =

American activist for sex worker rights

- Born: April 1, 1960 (age 66)
- Education: Oregon State University
- Occupations: activist, author, Coach
- Website: theshamefreezone.com

Veronica Monet (born April 1, 1960) is an American author, relationship coach, certified sexologist, and former sex worker rights activist. She is known for her writing on intimacy, relationships, and sexuality, as well as for her public advocacy and media appearances related to sex worker rights during the 1990s and early 2000s.

== Early life and education ==
Veronica Monet was born to working-class parents in the rural town of Prairie City, Oregon. She was homeschooled and did not participate in public education until entering college in 1978 when she was granted Honors at Entrance at Oregon State University. In 1982, she graduated from Oregon State University with honors, earning a Bachelor of Science in psychology and a minor in business administration.

In several articles and personal accounts, as well as in videos published on her Substack and YouTube channel, Monet has stated that she experienced sexual abuse during her childhood and adolescence. She has also said that both of her parents were survivors of childhood sexual assault and that incest occurred on both sides of her family. Monet has discussed these experiences publicly as part of her broader work addressing trauma, sexuality, and emotional healing.

Her early professional experience included positions as an office manager for a furniture store, department manager for Compath National (a telephone systems company), secretary for Xerox and Digital Equipment Corporation, and marketing representative for KLRS radio in Santa Cruz, California.

In her early adult life, Monet used drugs and alcohol, eventually entering the twelve-step program and becoming sober in 1985.

== Career ==
=== Corporate work ===
From 1982 to 1989, Monet was employed in a range of corporate and administrative positions. These roles included office management, departmental supervision, secretarial work in large technology firms, and marketing within the radio industry.

=== Sex worker rights activism ===
Monet is a lifelong activist for a variety of causes including Rape and Domestic Violence awareness and shelter volunteering in the early 80’s, Bisexual Visibility in the late 80’s, sex worker rights in the 90’s and early 2000’s plus many other progressive causes. She regularly protests and has been doing so for decades.

She volunteered with COYOTE (Call Off Your Old Tired Ethics) and the Sex Worker Outreach Project USA (SWOP-USA), two prominent organizations advocating for the decriminalization of sex work and improved safety and labor rights for sex workers.

As an activist, Monet appeared in national media outlets including CNN, FOX News, and The New York Times. Journalist Jeff Goodell featured Monet in a New York Times Magazine article that discussed the economics and culture surrounding the escort industry and the broader public debate over sex work. She also participated in televised debates with public figures, including then-Congressman John Kasich.

=== Writing and authorship ===
Monet transitioned away from sex work in 2004 and wrote her first book in 2005, establishing herself as an author and a commentator on relationships, sexuality, and personal development. Her writing addresses themes of intimacy, emotional health, trauma recovery, and relational dynamics.

In addition to authoring her own book, Monet has chapters in many anthologies and regularly addresses relationships, sexuality, and emotional healing in her various online blogs. She has a long-running presence as a public speaker and writer.

Monet has also been quoted as an expert on sex and porn addiction in books including Recover to Live: Kick Any Habit Manage Any Addiction (2012) by Christopher Lawford and Man Disconnected: How Technology Has Sabotaged what it Means to be Male (2015) by Philip Zimbardo.

=== Relationship coaching and professional training ===
Monet has worked as a relationship coach for approximately two decades. She is trained in Internal Family Systems (IFS) but does not present herself as licensed or certified as a therapist. She has emphasized this distinction publicly, noting that she is a coach rather than a mental health clinician.

She is also a certified sexologist, a credential distinct from psychotherapy licensure. Her work focuses on relationship dynamics, emotional patterns, and sexuality rather than clinical diagnosis or treatment.

=== Film and media work ===
Monet is credited as Creative Consultant on the documentary film Love Over Money, which examines the life and work of food activist John Robbins. The film has received recognition at film festivals and includes Monet in its official credits.

She has also worked as a freelance Creative Director and Script Consultant for the Food Revolution Network, contributing to summit programming and video content. Her credits appear at the conclusion of Food Revolution Network summit productions, and she is listed as an author on the organization’s website.

== Selected works ==
=== Books ===
- Monet, Veronica (2005). Veronica Monet's Sex Secrets of Escorts: What Men Really Want. DK Publishing. ISBN 9781440690778.
- Monet, Veronica (2009). Sex de Luxe: Profi-Tipps für heiße Nächte (in German). Goldmann Verlag. ISBN 9783641017033.
