= John Robbins (author) =

American author (1947–2025)

John Ernest Robbins
- Born: October 26, 1947; Los Angeles, California, U.S.
- Died: June 11, 2025 (aged 77); Soquel, California, U.S.
- Education: University of California, Berkeley
- Occupation: Author
- Known for: Diet for a New America, 1987; Robbins at the Miami Book Fair International, 1991
- Spouse: Annette Lyn Ainis
- Children: Ocean Robbins
- Parents: Irvine "Irv" Robbins (father); Irma Gevurtz Robbins (mother)
- Relatives: Edie Baskin (niece); Richard Baskin (nephew); Burt Baskin (brother-in-law); Isadore Familian (brother-in-law)
- Website: www.johnrobbins.info

John Robbins (October 26, 1947 – June 11, 2025) was an American author, who popularized the links among nutrition, environmentalism and animal rights.

Robbins was the author of the 1987 Diet for a New America, an exposé on connections between diet, physical health, animal cruelty, and environmentalism. Robbins founded the organization EarthSave in 1988 and co-founded the Food Revolution Network with his son, Ocean, in 2011. He was a leading voice in the plant-based movement.

== Life and career ==
John Ernest Robbins was the son of Irma Robbins and Irv Robbins, co-founder and co-owner of Baskin-Robbins. He was Jewish of Polish-Jewish and Russian-Jewish descent. He had two sisters, Marsha and Erin. John graduated from the University of California, Berkeley, in 1969, and received a master's degree from Antioch College, in 1976. Rather than following the ice-cream parlor legacy of his father, he left the company to seek a simpler life. He and his wife Deo were married on March 10, 1967. Ocean Robbins, their son, is the founder of Food Revolution Network.

In 1987, Diet for a New America was published. In the book Robbins links the impacts of factory farming on human health, the environment, and animal welfare, to make a case for a plant-based diet. A year later he founded EarthSave. In 2001, Robbins updated and reiterated his advocacy of whole foods, plant-based diet for ethical, environmental and health reasons in the book The Food Revolution. The book includes information on organic food, genetically modified food, and factory farming.

He worked with PETA in 2002 to sue the California Milk Advisory Board over its 'happy cows' television advertisement. The Milk Advisory Board won on a technicality.

His 2006 book Healthy at 100, published by Random House, was printed on 100% post-consumer non-chlorine bleached paper, a first for a book from a major U.S. publisher.

Robbins was on the advisory board of Naked Food Magazine, for which he was a regular contributor of articles espousing a plant-based diet.

== Death ==
Robbins died from complications of post-polio syndrome at his home, on June 11, at the age of 77.

== EarthSave ==
In 1988, Robbins founded EarthSave, an international, non-profit organization. The organization was born to channel the reader response to his Diet for a New America. EarthSave did outreach to the non-vegetarian public, with information tables and vegetarian social activities such as vegetarian Thanksgiving potlucks, and activism on vegetarian, animal, and food system issues.

EarthSave sponsored a youth-outreach group, YES (Youth for Environmental Sanity), which toured the country visiting high schools and raising awareness of the EarthSave message.

EarthSave continues to promote healthy, environmentally sound food choices. As of January 2022, its head office is in Chatsworth, California.

Earthsave Canada was established as a registered non-profit charity in British Columbia in March 1990.

== Books ==
- Diet for a New America: How Your Food Choices Affect Your Health, Happiness and the Future of Life on Earth, (1987). ISBN 978-0-915811-81-6
- May All Be Fed: Diet For a New World, 1992.
- Reclaiming Our Health: Exploding the Medical Myth and Embracing the Source of True Healing, 1996.
- The Awakened Heart: Meditations on Finding Harmony in a Changing World, 1997.
- The Food Revolution: How Your Diet Can Help Save Your Life and Our World, 2001, ISBN 978-1-57324-487-9
- Healthy at 100: The Scientifically Proven Secrets of the World’s Healthiest and Longest-Lived Peoples, 2006, ISBN 978-0-345-49011-7
- The New Good Life: Living Better Than Ever in an Age of Less, (2010), Ballantine Books, 304 pages ISBN 978-0-345-51984-9
- No Happy Cows: Dispatches from the Frontlines of the Food Revolution, 2012.
- Voices of the Food Revolution: You Can Heal Your Body and Your World with Food!, (May 6, 2013)

== Film ==
- Diet for a New America (1991) featuring Michael Klaper, T. Colin Campbell, and John A. McDougall
- Super Size Me (2004) by Morgan Spurlock has a short interview with Robbins.
- Love Over Money, a 2023 documentary about Robbins' life story
