= Michael Klaper =

American physician

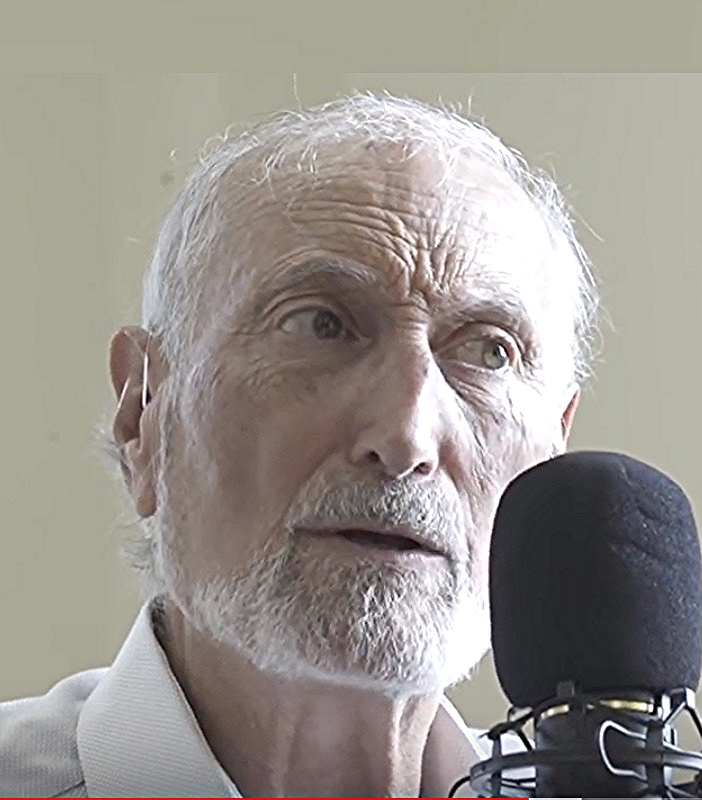
- Klaper in 2019
- Born: Michael Anthony Klaper; July 19, 1947 (age 78); Illinois, USA
- Education: University of Illinois College of Medicine, 1972
- Occupation: Medical doctor
- Known for: Veganism
- Spouse: Alese Jones
- Relatives: parents: David Klaper, DDS (father); Jean T. Klaper (mother); Robert D. Klaper (brother); Cynthia Lee Pararo (ex-wife); Alese Jones (wife since April 8, 2014)
- Medical career
- Profession: Family medicine
- Institutions: Institute for Nutrition Research and Education, NASA, True North Health Center, Santa Rosa Medical Center
- Sub-specialties: nutritional medicine, lifestyle medicine, veganism
- Research: nutritional medicine, vegan nutrition
- Website: www.doctorklaper.com

Michael A. Klaper (July 19, 1947) is an American physician, vegan health educator, conference and event speaker, and an author of articles and books of vegan medical advice. Graduating from medical school in 1972, Klaper became a vegan ten years later and subsequently became active in the area, publishing three books advocating veganism and serving as a founding director of the Institute of Nutrition Education and Research.

== Early life and education ==
Klaper was born July 19, 1947, to Chicago South Side dentist, David T. Klaper, DDS, and Jean T. Klaper (formerly of Boca Raton, Florida). Klaper had an older brother, Robert D. Klaper, who died in 1992 at the age of 49. By his own report, Klaper grew up on a dairy farm in Wisconsin. In 1972, Klaper graduated from the University of Illinois College of Medicine and served his medical internship in Canada at Vancouver General Hospital with the University of British Columbia. He also studied obstetrics at the University of California, San Francisco. He is Jewish.

His three books were authored during his time with Gentle World in Umatilla, Florida.

In 1987 Klaper appeared on the game show Jeopardy! and won $11,000.

== Career ==
After graduating from medical school Klaper moved among a number of locations, practiced acute care medicine, and eventually became certified in urgent care medicine. He became a vegan in 1981. He is a medical consultant for the North American Vegetarian Society and has spoken at their Vegetarian Summerfest in 2012 and 2018. Klaper has spoken at several other national and international vegan, vegetarian, and natural health conferences and events.

He served as director of a vegan health spa in Pompano Beach, Florida, from the early 1990s and was featured on the 1991 PBS documentary Diet for a New America, based on the book of the same name by John Robbins. In 1988, Klaper was a NASA nutrition adviser on vegan diets for long term space colonists.

He also served on the Nutrition and Preventive Medicine Task Force of the American Medical Student Association (AMSA), where he was a member of its Board of Advisors. He cofounded with John Robbins the environmental organization EarthSave International and served as its Scientific Director. He was a Founding Director of the Institute of Nutrition Education and Research.

Klaper maintained a medical practice in Maui, Hawaii, between 1995 and 2006, and practiced medicine in Whangārei, New Zealand between 2006 and 2009. In 2009, he relocated to Northern California, where as of 2011 he became staff physician and medical consultant at the nutritionally-based TrueNorth Health Center in Santa Rosa, where he is now on the board of directors of the TrueNorth Health Foundation. He is licensed to practice medicine in California and Hawaii and now is affiliated with the Santa Rosa Memorial Hospital.

His books include Vegan Nutrition: Pure and Simple and Pregnancy, Children, and the Vegan Diet. He has appeared in several films related to vegan diet and practice, including Eat This! (2005), Cowspiracy: The Sustainability Secret (2014), and What the Health (2017).

Klaper is on the advisory board, and regular contributor to the quarterly publication Naked Food Magazine.

In the summer of 1992, he was inducted into the Vegetarian Hall of Fame of the North American Vegetarian Society.

== Works ==
Books

- Klaper, Michael (2000) [1987]. Vegan Nutrition: Pure and Simple (4th ed.). Kapaau, Hawaii: Gentle World. ISBN 978-0-929274-23-2.
- Klaper, Michael (1991) [1988]. Pregnancy, Children, and the Vegan Diet (1st ed.). Kapaau, Hawaii: Gentle World. ISBN 978-0-9614248-2-4.

Republished in German in 2007 as Viva vegan für Mutter und Kind: gesunde vegetarische Ernährung während Schwangerschaft und Kindheit, Publisher: Animal-Peace-Verlag, 2007; ISBN 978-3-98117380-2; 134 pages.

Forewords in books, including

- Gentle World. The Cookbook for People Who Love Animals. Publisher: Gentle World, Inc., 1990. ISBN 978-0-929274-18-8. 192 pages.

The author of the 1990 cookbook is Gentle World, and the Foreword was written by Klaper.

Various journal articles, including:

- Goldhamer AC, Klaper M, Foorohar A, Myers TR (December 10, 2015). "Water-only fasting and an exclusively plant foods diet in the management of stage IIIa, low-grade follicular lymphoma". BMJ Case Reports. 2015: bcr2015211582. doi:10.1136/bcr-2015-211582. PMC 4680557. PMID 26655228.
- Nejad MS, Klaper MA, Steggerda FR, Gianturco C (1968). "Clotting on the outer surfaces of vascular catheters". Radiology. 91 (2): 248–50. doi:10.1148/91.2.248. PMID 5661255..

Videos

- A Diet for All Reasons
- Sense and Nonsense in Nutrition: A Look at Today's Most Common Health Myths. VegSource Studio: 67 minutes. ASIN B009DOGJOA.

== See also ==
- Benjamin Spock
- Vegan nutrition
