= Food Revolution Network =

Online education and advocacy organization

- Founded: 2012
- Founders: John Robbins, Ocean Robbins
- Headquarters: Santa Cruz, CA, US
- Products: Food Revolution Summit, WHOLE Life Club, Plant-Based Coaching Certification
- Website: foodrevolution.org

Food Revolution Network (FRN) is an online education and advocacy organization, with over 1,000,000 members, that focuses on the benefits of a whole-foods, plant-based diet.

The company was founded in 2012 by a father-son team: famed vegetarian author and activist John Robbins and his son, entrepreneur and author Ocean Robbins.

== History ==
Food Revolution Network was established in response to growing concerns about the impact of dietary choices on health, animal welfare, and the environment. John Robbins, author of the influential book Diet for a New America, and his son, Ocean Robbins, sought to create a platform that could empower individuals to make informed food choices and advocate for systemic change in food systems.

Prior to co-founding Food Revolution Network, both John and Ocean Robbins had founded the non-profits: EarthSave International and YES! (Youth for Environmental Sanity), respectively. But after becoming frustrated with the financial limitations of non-profits, John and Ocean created a social profit organization: Food Revolution Network.

Food Revolution Network launched in 2012 with its first online program, The Food Revolution Summit — an annual online event featuring dozens of experts in plant-based nutrition, health, the environment, and the industrialized food system. Notable former speakers include Paul McCartney, Tony Robbins, and Jane Goodall.

Since 2023, the event has adopted a docuseries format after previously being audio-only.

== See also ==
- Baskin-Robbins
