= International Day to End Violence Against Sex Workers =

Annual awareness day

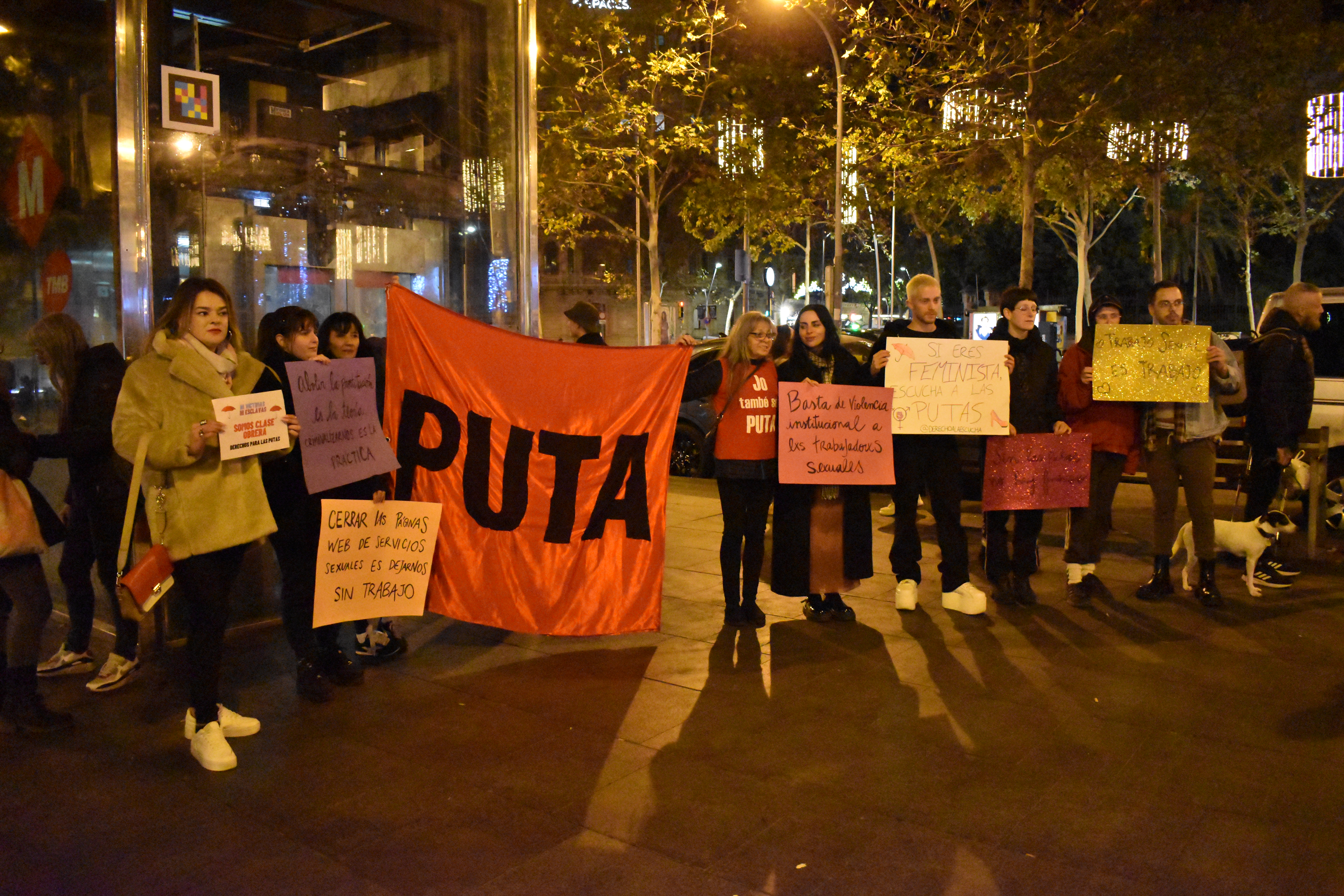
Protest in Barcelona, 17 December 2023

The International Day to End Violence Against Sex Workers is observed annually on 17 December by sex workers, their clientele, friends, families and allies. Originally conceived as a memorial and vigil for the victims of the Green River Killer in Seattle, Washington, US, it has evolved into an annual international event. The day calls attention to hate crimes committed against sex workers worldwide, as well as the need to remove the social stigma and discrimination that have contributed to violence against sex workers and indifference from the communities they are part of. Sex worker activists also claim that custom and prohibitionist laws perpetuate such violence.

== Background ==
First observed in 2003, the International Day to End Violence Against Sex Workers was founded by Annie Sprinkle and Robyn Few, founder of the Sex Workers Outreach Project USA (SWOP-USA), an American sex worker rights organization. In a public letter, Sprinkle states:

Violent crimes against sex workers go underreported, unaddressed and unpunished. There really are people who don't care when prostitutes are victims of hate crimes, beaten, raped, and murdered. No matter what you think about sex workers and the politics surrounding them, sex workers are a part of our neighborhoods, communities and families.

== Red umbrella symbol ==
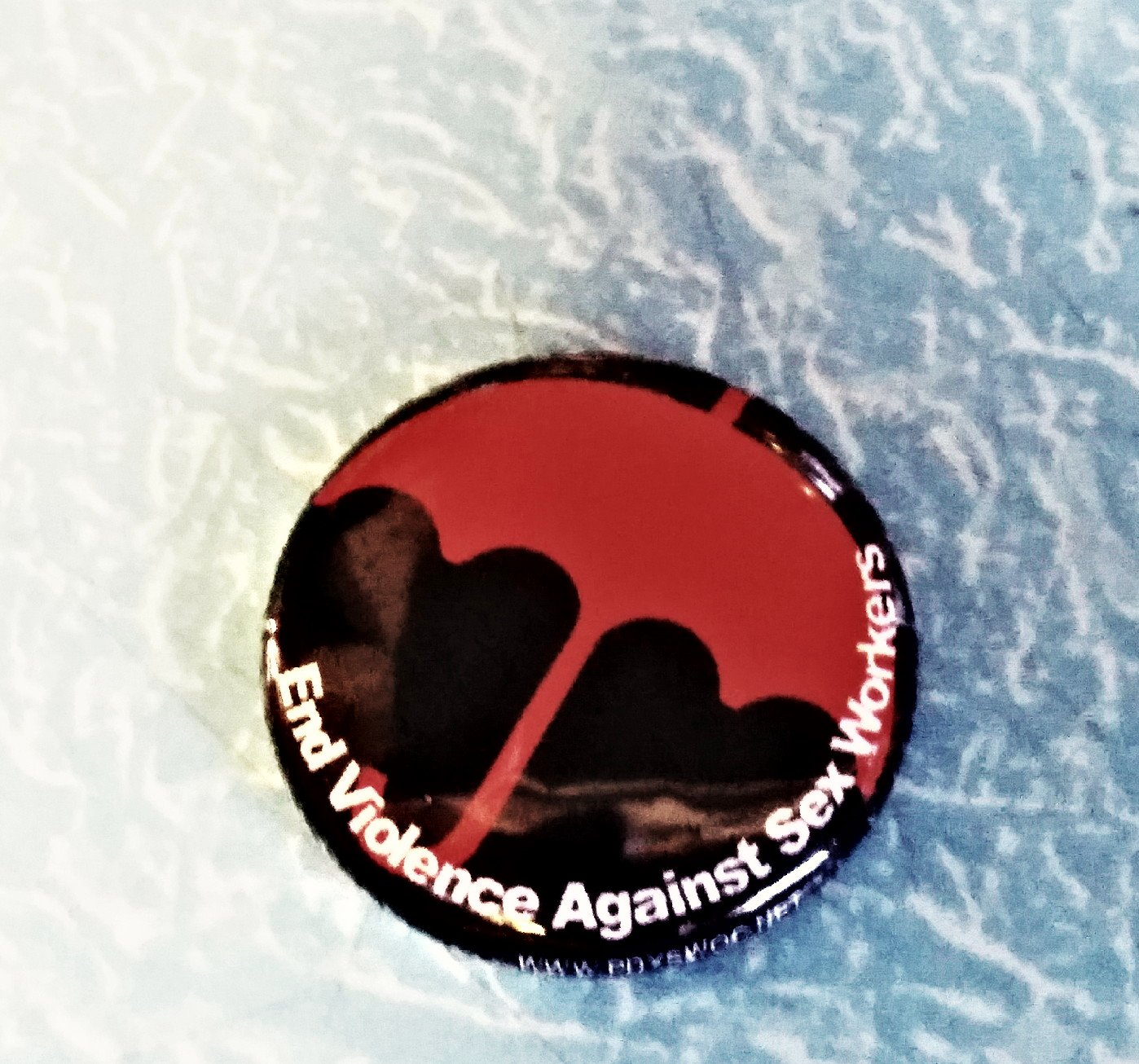
Red umbrella badge

The red umbrella is a symbol for sex worker rights and is used for events that are held on 17 December. The red umbrella symbol was first used by sex workers in Venice in 2001. Slovenian artist Tadej Pogacar collaborated with sex workers to create the "Prostitute Pavilion" and CODE: RED art installation for the 49th Venice Biennale. Sex workers also held a street demonstration, the Red Umbrellas March, to protest inhumane work conditions and human rights abuses.

The International Committee on the Rights of Sex Workers in Europe (ICRSE) adopted the red umbrella as a symbol of resistance to discrimination in 2005. A corresponding march was organized as the closing event to the European Conference on Sex Work, Human Rights, Labour and Migration conference, held in Brussels at which almost 200 participants appeared.

== See also ==
- $pread
- A Vindication of the Rights of Whores
- Audacia Ray
- COYOTE
- Decriminalization of sex work
- International Whores' Day
- Margo St. James
- Neal Falls
- Sex workers' rights
- Sex-positive feminism
- Sexual and reproductive health and rights
- World Charter for Prostitutes' Rights
