= Edie Baskin =

American photographer and art director (born 1945/46)

Edie Baskin Bronson
- Born: Edie Baskin; 1945 or 1946 (age 80–81)
- Occupations: Photographer; art director
- Years active: 1975 to present
- Known for: Saturday Night Live
- Spouse: Richard "Skip" Bronson
- Father: Burt Baskin
- Relatives: Richard Baskin (brother); Irv Robbins (uncle); John Robbins (cousin); Isadore Familian (stepfather)

Edie Baskin Bronson (born c. 1946) is an American photographer and art director.

She was Saturday Night Live's resident photographer from the show's premiere in 1975 until 1999. She produced the pictures of New York City nightlife and portraits of the show's cast that appeared during the show's original title sequence, as well as portraits of the guest hosts that were displayed during each episode's opening and commercial bumpers.

== Early life ==
Baskin was raised in Studio City, Los Angeles, in a Reform Jewish household. She is the daughter of Burt Baskin (1913–1967), co-founder of the Baskin-Robbins ice cream parlor chain, and Shirley Baskin (née Robbins, 1920–2022), sister of Baskin-Robbins co-founder Irv Robbins. Her mother later married entrepreneur Isadore Familian.

Prior to her career in photography, Baskin worked as a tour guide at Paramount Studios, as well as a fashion model. She appeared in a small role as an unnamed model in Live a Little, Love a Little (1968), a musical comedy film starring Elvis Presley.

She began taking photographs while visiting her brother, Richard Baskin, on the set of Robert Altman's Nashville, where he served as the musical director and produced the film's soundtrack.

She later relocated to New York City, realizing an aspiration she had held since adolescence, drawn by the appeal of the city's bohemian subculture.

== Career ==
From the show's premiere in 1975 to 1999, Baskin was the chief photographer of Saturday Night Live (SNL). Baskin was friends with the show's creator, Lorne Michaels, whom she had met in Los Angeles during a poker game. While in New York, Baskin showed Michaels some of her photographs and asked if she could be part of the show he was creating. Baskin introduced Michaels to Paul Simon, whom she was dating during SNL's inception. Simon later became a frequent guest on the show and developed a close friendship with Michaels.

Baskin's portraits of both the show's cast and guest hosts were featured weekly on the show, as well as her shots of New York city featured during the initial title sequence. The photographs, taken in black-and-white, were hand-tinted with pastels, markers, pencils and oil paint. She also co-authored the book Saturday Night Live: The First Twenty Years (1994) with editor Michael Cader.

Photographer Mary Ellen Matthews joined the staff of SNL in 1993 as an assistant to Baskin, and took over from her after the 1999 season. Matthews has referred to Baskin as her "hero and mentor."

In addition to her work on SNL, Baskin's photographs have appeared in the title sequences of such shows as Steve Martin's NBC comedy special Steve Martin's Best Show Ever (1981), the CBS sitcom Square Pegs, and the PBS anthology series American Playhouse. Baskin was nominated for two Emmy Awards in the category of Outstanding Individual Achievement in Graphic Design and Title Sequences: once in 1976 for her work on SNL (while it was still known as NBC's Saturday Night), and in 1982 for her work on Square Pegs.

Baskin's photographs have appeared in such publications as Newsweek, Time, Vogue, New York, The Village Voice, The New York Times, Rolling Stone, as well as album covers, such as Simon's Still Crazy After All These Years, the Simon & Garfunkel single "My Little Town", Cheryl Lynn's In The Night, and the Streets of Fire soundtrack.

Subsequent to her tenure at SNL, Baskin returned to the Los Angeles area. Her photographs were included in Springsteen: Troubadour of the Highway, an exhibition of Bruce Springsteen photos, videos and memorabilia, that toured the US from 2002 to 2004. In 2006 she exhibited Edie Baskin: New Native Americans featuring photographs of contemporary Native Americans.

Live From My Studio: The Art of Edie Baskin, a retrospective of Baskin's work, was published in 2025.

== Personal life ==
Baskin is married to businessman and real estate developer Richard "Skip" Bronson. They live in Beverly Hills, California.

In 2018, Baskin and her husband received the "Visionary Award", presented to them by the Neurosurgery Division at Ronald Reagan UCLA Medical Center in Los Angeles for their financial support of the center's Neurovascular Research Program. The centre also named their cerebral blood flow laboratory the Edie Baskin Bronson and Richard Skip Bronson CBF Laboratory.

== Bibliography ==
- Cader, Michael; Baskin, Edie (1994). Saturday Night Live: The First Twenty Years. Houghton Mifflin. ISBN 9780395708958. OCLC 30973461.
- Baskin, Edie (September 30, 2025). Live From My Studio: The Art of Edie Baskin. ACC Art Books. ISBN 9781788843430.
