= Afina =

Plumbing fixtures company

- Company type: Private
- Industry: Plumbing fixtures
- Founded: 2024; 2 years ago
- Headquarters: Austin, Texas, United States
- Key people: Ramon van Meer (founder)
- Products: Bath and shower fixtures
- Website: afina.com

Afina is an American product line of filtered shower heads founded by Ramon van Meer. The company is headquartered in Austin, Texas.

== History ==
van Meer, a Netherlands-born businessperson, founded Afina in October 2024, producing shower heads that filter out chlorine and other chemicals often found in tap water.

The company is best known for its Afina A-01 shower head.

In April 2025, van Meer publicly documented an experiment testing whether American consumers would pay more for a domestically manufactured product amid rising U.S.–China trade tariffs. The experiment revealed no preference.

== See also ==
- Hansgrohe
- Pfister
