= Leave Freeze or Die =

Webcomic by Jeremy Yuenger

Leave, Freeze or Die
- Author: Jeremy Yuenger
- Website: http://www.filefishcomics.com/
- Current status/schedule: Weekly
- Launch date: August, 2004
- Genre: Humor/Slice-of-Life

Leave Freeze or Die is a webcomic written and drawn by Jeremy Yuenger. It follows the misadventures of the students of fictional College University in Manchester, New Hampshire, and their dealings with figures from pop culture, state and local politics, and the media. It is published in strip form weekly by Neighborhood News, Inc. in their print publications and on NewHampshire.com, and as part of NewHampshire.com's insert in the New Hampshire Union Leader. It is also appears periodically in graphic-novel format at FileFishComics.com. The title is a spoof of the New Hampshire state motto, "Live Free or Die".

The weekly strip in its current form began in 2004. It is a spin-off of the graphic novel series of the same name begun in 1989, and was preceded by another weekly comic with the same cast, entitled Over the Counter Culture, which ran in Boston College's The Heights from 1996 through 1999. Yuenger created the comic originally to make fun of the industrial arts faculty at his middle school, and later expanded it to include public figures and classmates from Manchester High School Central, who formed the basis of the characters. Yuenger publishes his work as "FileFish Comics", but is in fact the only person behind the company.

== Synopsis ==
The content of the series is largely episodic, usually focusing on efforts by the students to entertain themselves in a city largely devoid of entertainment options. In doing so, they typically run afoul of the Union Leader and its publisher, whose far-right values oppose anything the kids would consider to be fun. The central protagonist is Pete, a 21-year-old divorced college student and actor.

Long-term plot arcs have dealt with the college dean's attempt to clone the faculty for cheap labor (issues 91–97), the students' participation in a civil war in a fictional banana republic (issues 53–54, 72–73, 104–107), and Pete and Amy's marriage (issues 78, 98–99, 101). Several issues (55, 76–77, 87) involve run-ins with members of the Zendik commune. The weekly strips have featured shorter stories dealing with former governor Craig Benson reduced to working in a convenience store, publisher Joseph McQuaid being visited by the ghost of his chain-smoking former teen idol who begs him not to oppose anti-smoking legislation, and Manchester mayor Robert A. Baines attempting to infiltrate the city's nightlife to foil crime. Recent strips have dealt with the influx of presidential candidates to the city ahead of the 2008 New Hampshire primary.

== Main characters ==
- Pete — Pete is the de facto main character of the series. He is generally the victim of the actions of everyone else around him. He has squinty eyes, curly black hair, and wears a blue turtleneck sweater. Pete is an actor in The Maskers, the college's drama club. His ex-wife is Amy, who he began dating in Over the Counter Culture and married in issue #78. They separated in issue #98 when Amy discovered she was a lesbian. Following a mental breakdown, Pete has since lived with Shawn and James. He also has a rarely seen younger brother, Danny, and a pet boa constrictor. Pete, Danny and Amy all share the 'Boisvert Nose', a genetic condition marked by a rounded, bulbous nose.
- Amy — Amy is Pete's ex-wife. She has large eyes, long black hair, and usually dresses in shades of grey and black. She is addicted to Vertigo Comics and Slash fiction. Amy is known for her sexual openness and activity in the BDSM scene. She operates the website MexicanSexActs.com, where she pretends to be a Mexican man with a salsa fetish, sporting a mustache. The character of Amy is partly based on sex enthusiast Audacia Ray.
- Jimmy — Jimmy is an insecure young man with sandy brown hair and freckles. He wears a Star Trek uniform and a priest's collar. Jimmy joined the priesthood in an ill-fated attempt to win the love of a girl named Libby, who he felt would be impressed with his dedication. He is frequently bullied by his friend Lleij and torn between his priestly vows and his lust for Libby, who refuses to acknowledge him.
- Lleij — Lleij is a part-time talk show host, inventor, and nerd. He is dark-skinned and wears a bow-tie and button down shirt with a pocket protector. Lleij lives in his parents' basement and uses Jimmy as his guinea pig when conducting experiments.
- Nate — Nate is a green-haired slacker who performs in a two-man band and lives in a tent behind the school, where he has pretended to be a student without actually enrolling. He has held several temporary jobs including lumberjack, backpack-stuffer, vacuum salesman, reporter for the Union Leader, and convenience store clerk.
- Trish — Trish is a blonde hippy girl who heads the militant activist group Students 4 Socialist Justice. She carries a pistol and often resorts to violence to get her way. Trish helped Pal the janitor clear himself of murder charges by bringing him to the Zendik commune, where he learned kung-fu and how to speak intelligibly and avenge himself. Trish has a strong cult following, and memorabilia with her likeness (T-shirts, mugs, etc.) is quite valuable to eBay bidders.
- Rolly — Rolly is the students' former high-school principal, who quit to follow them to college so he could continue to torment them as the school's dean. He has a homoerotic relationship with Dan, his sidekick and the school's quarterback, who lives with him in a bunker beneath the school. Rolly's appearance is modeled after Sludge Vohaul from the Space Quest videogames.
- Joseph McQuaid — Joe is the publisher of the Union Leader, an ultraconservative newspaper that uses its undue influence to control the town's politics. He generally fails in his efforts to live up to the "evil" of his predecessor, Nackey Loeb, despite receiving an injection of her DNA.

== Compilations ==
Unofficial photocopy collections of the comic date back to the early 1990s and were edited by the real-life inspiration for the character of Pete, Pete Boisvert, at Yuenger's request. CD-ROMs were issued later, covering most material through the year 2000. Yuenger began printing paperback collections of issues #91 onwards beginning in 2005, and issued self-published hardcover collections in 2007.
