= Red Umbrella Project =

US non-profit organization that advocates on behalf of sex workers

- Named after: Red Umbrella Protest
- Founded: 2010; 16 years ago
- Founder: Audacia Ray
- Type: Non-profit
- Location: New York City, New York, U.S.
- Services: Sex workers' rights

The Red Umbrella Project is a New York–based non-profit organization that advocates on behalf of sex workers and strives to empower them by giving them a voice.

== History ==
The Red Umbrella Project was founded in 2010 by writer and activist Audacia Ray. As a former sex worker, Ray witnessed first-hand the discrimination against sex workers by police and society. Ray envisioned an organization where sex workers could come together to share their stories, advocate for change and help one another. She chose the name The Red Umbrella Project because in 2001 during the 49th Venice Biennale of Art in Venice, Italy, sex workers demonstrated against inhumane work conditions and human rights violations by holding up red umbrellas, making this a symbol of resistance to discrimination.

In 2009 Ray started hosting storytelling events for sex workers at the Happy Ending Lounge on New York's Lower East Side. The goals of these workshops and storytelling events were to shine light and empower sex workers, but it soon became apparent that these sex workers shared several common burdens. Many identified as trans or queer, there was an alarming rate of HIV/AIDS cases among them, they feared carrying condoms due to the criminalization of condoms, and most of all they were tossed aside and mistreated by most of society, when all they were doing is trying to make a living and find economic opportunity.

== Advocacy issues ==
=== Sex-worker diversion programs ===
In 2014 New York City created a series of special courts for sex workers arrested on prostitution-related charges. The new courts, known as Human Trafficking Intervention Courts (HTIC), treated all sex workers as human trafficking victims, and through a variety of bullying tactics forced defendants to forgo their constitutional right of a trial by jury and agree to a plea bargain of a sex worker diversion program which consisted of a court mandated treatment program, followed by adjournment in contemplation of dismissal (ACD). The Red Umbrella Project argued that the city's intentions were good and that the new court does help people who are forced into sex work. However, the court still treats the sex workers like criminals and makes the assumption that all sex workers are victims of human trafficking and that no one does sex work out of free will, for their personal economic gain. There may also be assumed discrimination within the workforce due to the fact that many sex workers are of color, queer or trans. The counseling and assistance offered through the court mandated treatment program provides them with no way of economic opportunity other than sex work. The Red Umbrella Project wants to see the sex-worker diversion program restructured with an emphasis on economic empowerment through job training and economic opportunities.

=== HIV/AIDS and trans health disparity ===
The Red Umbrella Project along with the Nation Center for Transgender Equality (NCTE) and Best Practices Policy Project (BPPP) published a report that transgender people in the sex trade are twelve times more likely to be living with HIV/AIDS than transgender people who were never involved in the sex trade and twenty-five times more likely to be living with HIV/AIDS than the general population. The Red Umbrella Project points to the fear of condoms as being used as evidence of prostitution along with profiling of race and gender by police officers where: "Women and trans people having condoms on them is criminalized, whereas a white cis male having condoms on him is looked at as safe-sex practice."

The Red Umbrella Project and other advocacy groups have been able to push for reform in heavily liberal cities such as New York City, San Francisco and Washington, D.C., but other more conservative cities such as Phoenix use condoms as evidence as part of their anti-prostitution campaign Project Rose.

== The Red Umbrella Diaries ==
The Red Umbrella Diaries started as a monthly story-telling event at the Happy Ending Lounge on New York's Lower East Side that sought to shed the stigma around sex work, make it less isolating and show that it can be both exploitative and empowering" at the same time. The Red Umbrella Diaries was listed by The Village Voice as "The Best Way to Meet Sex Workers (for Free)", and was listed as "Best of New York City's Sports and Recreation" in 2010.

The monthly event eventually led to a documentary produced by Audacia Ray and multi-Emmy Award–Winning director David Kornfield and funded by the Red Umbrella Project. The documentary featured seven sex workers telling their stories about trading money for sex on the streets of New York City. The documentary premiered at the Portland Film Festival, in Portland, Oregon, and at the IFC theater in New York City, and was a Doc NYC official selection.

== Memoir writing workshop ==
In 2012, the Red Umbrella Project started offering memoir writing workshops in New York City which was made possible in part by a grant from Poets & Writers. The peer-facilitated workshops were open to all people with experience in the sex trade and allowed sex workers a safe space to build writing skills, share their stories with others, and get feedback from their peers. Attendees of the workshop have the option of having their work published in the Red Umbrella Project's biannual literary journal Prose & Lore, and to share their work on stage as part of their Page to Stage workshop.

== See also ==
- A Vindication of the Rights of Whores
- COYOTE
- St. James Infirmary Clinic
- International Day to End Violence Against Sex Workers
- Sex worker movement
- Sex worker rights
- World Charter for Prostitutes Rights
