= Irv Robbins =

American businessman

Irvine Isaac Robbins
- Born: December 6, 1917; Winnipeg, Manitoba, Canada
- Died: May 5, 2008 (aged 90); Rancho Mirage, California, U.S.
- Education: University of Washington (BA)
- Occupation: Entrepreneur
- Years active: 1942−1978
- Known for: Baskin-Robbins
- Spouse: Irma Gevurtz (m. 1942)
- Children: 3, including John
- Relatives: Edie Baskin (niece); Richard Baskin (nephew); Burt Baskin (brother-in-law); Isadore Familian (brother-in-law)

Irvine "Irv" Isaac Robbins (December 6, 1917 – May 5, 2008) was a Canadian-born American businessman. He co-founded the Baskin-Robbins ice cream parlor chain in 1945 with his partner and brother-in-law Burt Baskin.

== Early life ==
Robbins was born in Winnipeg, Manitoba, Canada, to a Jewish family. He attended both Tacoma's Stadium High School, where he was a yell leader, and Seattle's Garfield High School.

His father, Aaron Robbins, owned a dairy and The Olympic Store ice cream business at 954 Court C in Tacoma, Washington, US. Robbins grew up scooping cones in his family's ice cream store for customers who always seemed to be having a good time. He recalled that he often "finished a day's work happy" and wanted that same feeling when he started his own business.

Irv Robbins attended the University of Washington in Seattle, was a member of the Zeta Beta Tau fraternity, and graduated with a degree in Political Science. He served in the U.S. Army as a Staff Sergeant in California, during World War II and was discharged in August 1945.

== Business career ==
Soon after getting out of the Army in 1945, he opened the Snowbird Ice Cream store on December 7, 1945, in Glendale, California. Robbins cashed in a $6,000 insurance policy given him for his bar mitzvah to start the business.

Burt Baskin owned a men's store in the Palmer House in Chicago, and married Robbins' sister Shirley in 1942. He had enlisted in the Navy and was released from service early 1946 and came to California, where Robbins convinced him that selling ice cream was more fun than selling men's ties & shirts, and within a couple of months he opened Burton's Ice Cream at 561 So. Lake Pasadena, California.

By 1948, the five Snowbird and three Burton's shops had been combined into a single enterprise, and they had devised their 31st flavor—Chocolate Mint. The partners came to the conclusion that because of the new stores they had opened, they were devoting less and less time to each individual store. "That's when we hit on selling our stores to our managers," Robbins said in the 1985 Los Angeles Times story. "Without realizing it at the time, we were in the franchise business before the word 'franchise' was fashionable. We opened another store and another and another. . . ." They made an agreement with the new store owners, which became "franchise agreements" and they became the first food company ever to franchise their outlets. Little did the McDonald's and Burger Kings of the future know, but the idea took hold in other retail establishments, and the age of "franchising" was underway.

In 1953, they renamed the company Baskin-Robbins, deciding the order of their names with a coin toss. The "31 flavors" concept was introduced that same year to bring attention to a deep menu that featured a flavor for every day of the month.

Baskin-Robbins had 43 stores by the end of 1949, more than 100 by 1960 and about 500 when the ice cream empire was sold to United Fruit Company for an estimated $12 million in 1967. Six months later, Burt Baskin died of a heart attack at 54. Robbins stayed involved with the company for 11 more years and retired in 1978. 25 years later, Baskin-Robbins had become the world's largest chain of ice cream stores, with 5,500 outlets around the world.

Baskin-Robbins is now a part of Inspire Brands.

== Personal life ==
Robbins was Jewish. He married Irma Gevurtz in 1942, just before he went to serve in the U.S. Army. Robbins and Irma had three children: Marsha, John (author of the 1987 book Diet for a New America), and Erin. Baskin and his wife Shirley had two children, Edie and Richard.

Robbins died of natural causes near his home in Rancho Mirage, California, at the age of 90.
