= Richard "Skip" Bronson =

American businessman and real estate developer

- Born: Richard D. Bronson; Hartford, Connecticut, U.S.
- Occupations: Real estate developer Entrepreneur
- Spouse: Edie Baskin Bronson
- Family: Burt Baskin (father-in-law); Isadore Familian (stepfather-in-law)

Richard D. "Skip" Bronson is an American businessman and real estate developer. He is also the author of War At The Shore: Steve Wynn, Donald Trump and the Epic Battle to Save Atlantic City.

== Early life and education ==
Bronson was born and raised in Hartford, Connecticut, the son of a window dresser at the G. Fox & Co. department store in Hartford. He started his career as an insurance salesman at the Travelers Insurance Company.

== Career ==
His career in real estate began when Carl Bennett, the founder of Caldor, tasked him with developing a satellite store in Brookfield, Connecticut. He went on to develop numerous strip malls throughout the region, culminating with the 38-story CityPlace I in Hartford, Connecticut's tallest building. At 1.2 million square feet and 38 stories, it is the state's largest and tallest office building.

Since 2000, Mr. Bronson has been the Chairman of The Bronson Companies, LLC, a real estate development, investment, and advisory company based in Beverly Hills, California. Mr. Bronson has been involved in developing commercial properties throughout the United States for more than thirty years.

Mr. Bronson serves on the Board of Directors of Starwood Property Trust (NYSE: STWD), the largest commercial mortgage real estate investment trust in the United States. He has been the company's Lead Independent Director since its inception in 2009.

He is also a Director of Starwood Real Estate Income Trust, a non-traded REIT focused on acquiring US and European commercial properties.

Additionally, he is a board member at Invitation Homes (NYSE: INVH). Based in Dallas, the company is the largest owner of single-family homes in America.

Previously, he was the president of New City Development, an affiliate of Mirage Resorts, overseeing the company's new business initiatives and activities outside of Nevada. He was also a board member of Mirage Resorts and is a former director of TRI Pointe Group, Inc. (NYSE: TPH), a homebuilder based in Irvine, California.

He has also served as a trustee and vice president of the International Council of Shopping Centers (ICSC), an association representing 70,000 industry professionals in more than 100 countries.

Bronson serves on the advisory board of the Neurosurgery Division at UCLA Medical Center in Los Angeles. He and his wife Edie Baskin Bronson were the recipients of the department's 2018 "Visionary Award”.

He is a past trustee of The Forman School in Litchfield, CT and is a past chairman of the board of The Archer School for Girls in Los Angeles.

A frequent guest on CNN, CNBC, MSNBC and Bloomberg TV, he is also the best-selling author of The War at the Shore, which chronicles the complexities of the real estate development process.

== Other ventures ==
Bronson was a founding partner in Monitor Productions, a joint venture with Main Events. Monitor Productions was a sports promotion company that developed the careers of boxers, including 1984 Olympic gold medal winners Mark Breland, Pernell Whitaker, Meldrick Taylor, and the former heavyweight champion Evander Holyfield. The company promoted "Battle of the Ages" in 1991, a boxing event featuring George Foreman and Holyfield, which set a pay-per-view record and grossed over $80 million.

== Wynn and Donald Trump Atlantic City dispute ==
Bronson worked with the New Jersey Governor's Office on their initiative to build the Atlantic City–Brigantine Connector, a $330 million road leading to a planned Mirage resort, in spite of the objections of Mirage's competitors, including Donald Trump. The dispute between Mirage and the Trump Organization escalated into a lawsuit and extensive legal battle. Construction was completed in 2001. The legal dispute between Wynn and Trump, including Bronson's involvement, is detailed in Bronson's best-selling book The War at the Shore: Steve Wynn, Donald Trump and the Epic Battle to Save Atlantic City.

== Podcast ==
In February 2024, he and his friend of more than 30 years, Paul Anka, created the podcast "Our Way with Paul Anka and Skip Bronson" in partnership with iHeart Radio.

== Personal life ==
He is married to Edie Baskin Bronson, daughter of Burt Baskin and stepdaughter of Isadore Familian. He has two sons, Scott and Jon Bronson, a daughter, Annabella Fay Saruk, and one grandchild, Goldie Bronson.
