= Isadore Familian =

American businessman (1911 – 2002)

- Born: Isadore Familian; 1911; Chicago, Illinois, US
- Died: June 13, 2002 (age 90-91); Los Angeles, California, US
- Spouses: Sunny Caplan; Shirley Robbins Baskin
- Family: Irv Robbins (brother-in-law); Edie Baskin Bronson (daughter-in-law); Richard "Skip" Bronson (son-in-law); Richard Baskin (stepson)

Isadore Familian (1911 – June 13, 2002) was a Los Angeles–based businessman and Jewish community leader who was CEO of Price Pfister Brass Manufacturing Company.

== Biography ==
Familian was born in 1911 to a Jewish family in Chicago. When he was two, his family moved to Los Angeles where his father founded Familian Pipe and Supply Co., a plumbing supply business. At the age of 16, he dropped out of Theodore Roosevelt High School to work at the family business. In 1941, he became president and purchased rival Price Pfister Brass Manufacturing Company. During World War II, the company, now using the Price Pfister name, shifted to military production manufacturing aircraft fittings and hand grenade shells. After the war, the company focused on residential faucets, feeding the postwar housing boom. Under his leadership, the company grew from 50 to 1,500 employees and became one of the largest manufacturers of brass bath and kitchen hardware in the world. In 1969, Price Pfister was sold to Norris Industries with Familian continuing on as chairman of the board.

The firm went through numerous ownership changes in the following years. In 1981, Norris was purchased in a leveraged buyout for $420 million by Kohlberg Kravis Roberts and renamed NI Industries. In 1985, NI Industries was purchased by Masco Corporation for $460 million. In 1988, Masco sold its Pfister subsidiary to Emhart Corporation. In 1989, Emhart was acquired by Black & Decker Corporation. In 2010, Black & Decker merged with Stanley Works to form Stanley Black & Decker. In 2012, Stanley Black & Decker sold for $1.4 billion its Hardware and Home Improvement Group, including Pfister, to Spectrum Brands Holdings Incorporated.

== Philanthropy ==
In 1947, he, along with his wife Sunny, founded the University of Judaism in Hollywood and was on its board of directors. Familian also was on the board of directors for City of Hope National Medical Center, City National Bank, the Los Angeles Music Center, and the Jewish Community Foundation. He chaired the United Jewish Welfare Fund drive for Greater Los Angeles and was active with the United Crusade and the March of Dimes. In 1941, he and his brother George financed the construction of the David Familian Chapel of Temple Adat Ari El in Valley Village named in honor of their father.

== Personal life ==
Familian was married twice. His first wife was Sunny Caplan (died 1979). His second wife was Shirley Robbins Baskin, sister of Irv Robbins and former wife of Burt Baskin. Familian died of natural causes at his home in Los Angeles; services were held at Hillside Memorial Park. Familian was survived by two biological children, Sondra Familian Smalley and Gary Familian; and two step children, Edie Baskin Bronson (married to Richard "Skip" Bronson) and Richard Baskin.
