= Mary Ellen Matthews =

American photographer

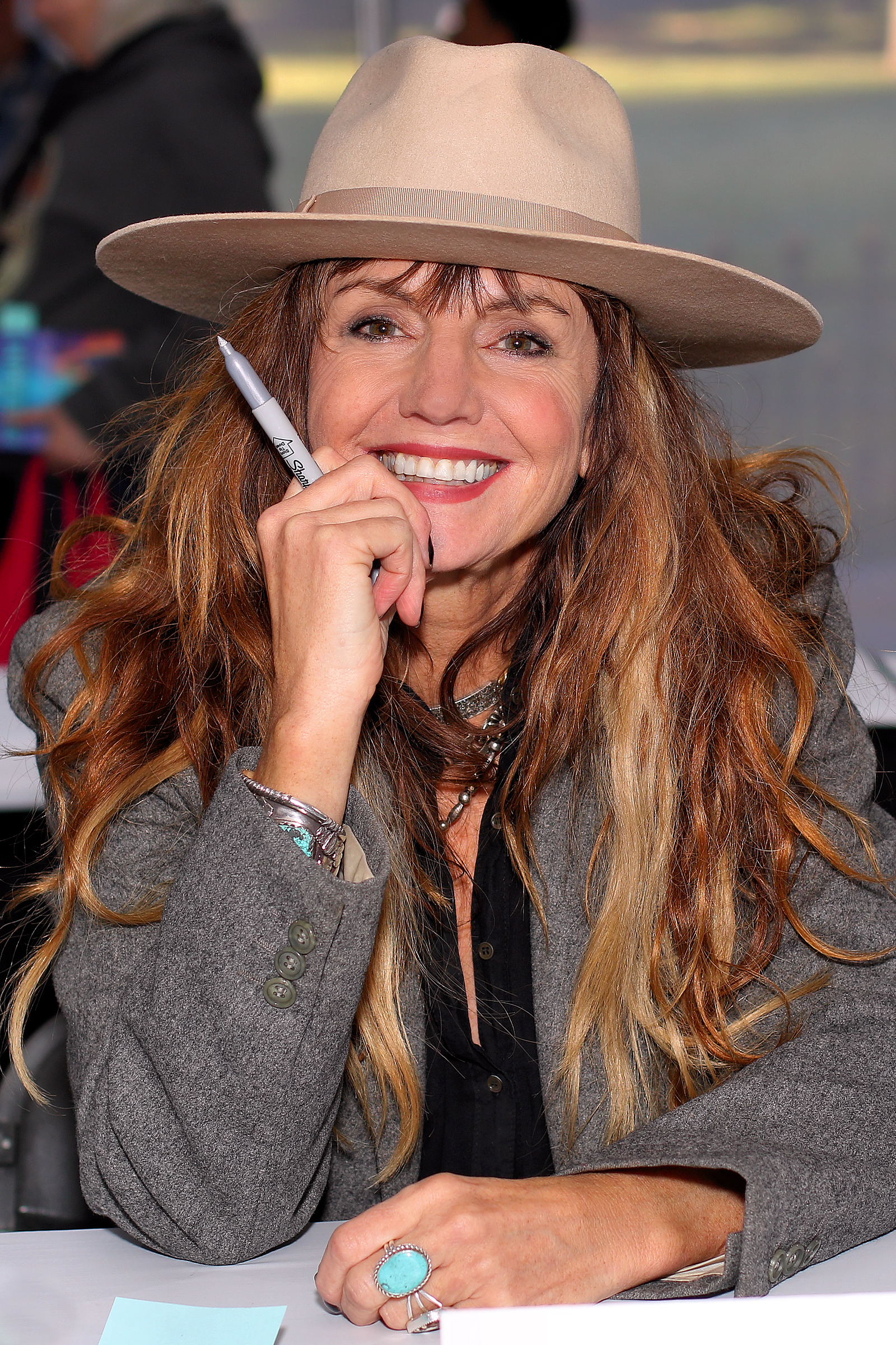
- Matthews at the 2025 Texas Book Festival
- Known for: Photography

Mary Ellen Matthews is a photographer based in New York City and East Hampton, New York. She is best known for her photographs featured on the television sketch comedy and variety show Saturday Night Live (SNL); her portraits of the celebrities who appear as guest-hosts and musical guests of SNL are displayed as the show returns from commercial breaks. Since 2010, she has also directed videos for SNL.

== Career ==
A native of New Jersey, and currently living in East Hampton, New York, Matthews began her career in film production and music publicity. She moved into the field of entertainment photography when she joined the staff of SNL in 1993 as an assistant to photographer Edie Baskin. In 1999, she took over from Baskin, becoming responsible for the celebrity portraits used as commercial bumpers on the show.

Matthews' SNL photographs are taken at NBC headquarters in the GE Building in New York City's Rockefeller Center. Matthews uses Studio 8H as her shooting space—the very same studio from which SNL is broadcast; she often photographs the week's guest-host as the week's musical guest practices their musical set in the same studio. In the summer of 2010 a retrospective of Matthew's photographs from SNL titled "Live from New York: A Decade of Portraits" was exhibited at the John Varvatos boutique at 315 Bowery in New York City—formerly the site of seminal music club CBGB. In 2025, Matthews published The Art of the SNL Portrait with Abrams Books, containing around 200 of her celebrity photos with a foreword written by Lorne Michaels. She also began directing video clips for SNL in 2010, such as the show's opening title sequence. Matthews' work was featured in the 2025 book The Art of the SNL Portrait.

In addition to her work on SNL, Matthews works in the realms of promotional, editorial and commercial photography for a variety of clients. Matthews is represented by the New York arm of the talent agency Jed Root Inc and her work has appeared in such publications as Rolling Stone, Marie Claire and the Spanish edition of Harper's Bazaar. She took promotional photographs of the 2009 fall/winter collection by Theory, a New York-based sportswear label, as well as photos for the movies What Happens in Vegas and Baby Mama. She has worked as a wedding photographer for such celebrities as Liv Tyler, Kate Hudson, and Tina Fey and has also toured with Aerosmith.

== Bibliography ==
- Matthews, Mary Ellen; Castle, Alison (March 4, 2025). The Art of the SNL Portrait. Abrams. ISBN 9798887076645.
