= Naked Food =

Quarterly magazine focusing on whole-food plant-based nutrition

Naked Food Magazine
- Naked Food Magazine Spring 2016 issue
- Editor: Margarita Restrepo
- Categories: Plant-based diet, vegan, health, magazine
- Frequency: Quarterly (4 issues/year)
- Format: Paper and digital
- Founder: Margarita Restrepo
- Founded: 2012
- Country: United States
- Based in: Fort Lauderdale, FL
- Language: English
- ISSN: 2373-4035

Naked Food is a quarterly magazine focusing on whole-food plant-based nutrition. It features health information, nutrition and food related news, recipes, interviews, events, and product, book, and film reviews.

It was founded as a digital publication in 2012 by Margarita Restrepo, and transitioned to a printed publication in the spring of 2014. The name stands for "new American kind and enlightened diet." The magazine is published in the United States, and distributed through bookstores and health-food stores in the U.S. .and Canada.

== Advisory board and contributors ==
- T. Colin Campbell
- Caldwell Esselstyn
- Michael Greger
- David L. Katz
- Michael Klaper
- Doug Lisle
- John A. McDougall
- John Robbins
- Del Sroufe
- Will Tuttle
- John Westerdahl

== See also ==
- List of vegan and plant-based media
