= Radical cheerleading =

Performative style of political activism

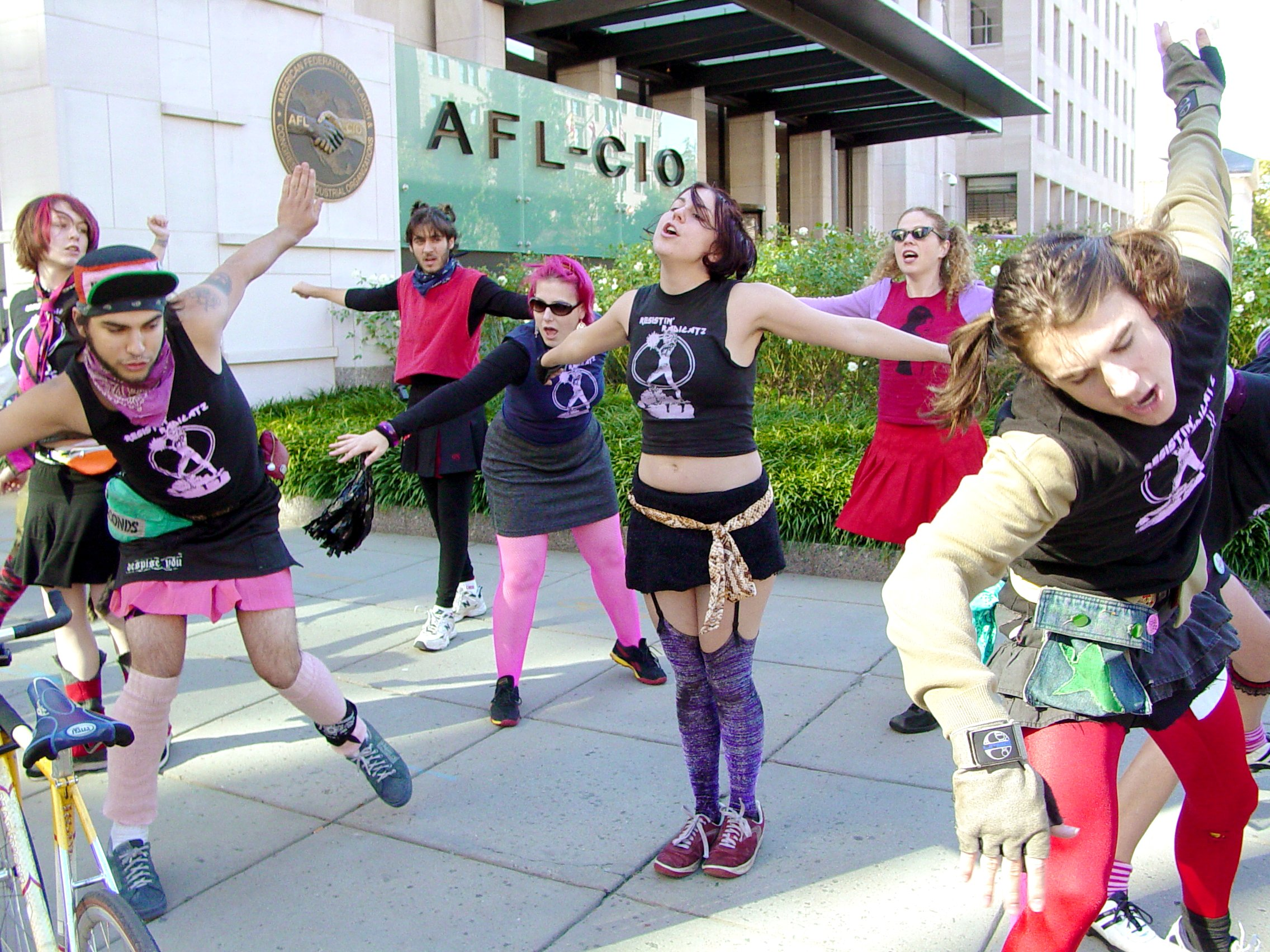
The Resistin Radicatz

Radical cheerleading is a performative style of political activism, derived from mainstream cheerleading. Radical cheerleading combines elements of peaceful protest or non-violent direct action with theatrical elements including costuming, spectacle and choreographed dance. Radical cheerleading was created by sisters Cara Jennings, Aimee Jennings and Coleen Jennings in Miami, Florida, USA in 1996. It grew to become an international movement with squads in the United States, Canada and the European Union. Radical cheerleaders create and adapt cheers that promote feminism and left-wing ideals.

== Subculture ==
Radical cheerleading developed as subculture apart from cheerleading. Mainstream cheerleading reached new heights of popularity in the 1990s, as it transformed from a form of entertainment to being understood as an athletic sport. The first Cheerleading World Championship took place in 2001, asserting cheerleading as a competitive sport. During this time the popular view of cheerleaders in the United States was highly gendered and highly sexualized, including the Bring It On franchise of films. The satirical practice of radical cheerleading developed alongside the growing popularity of cheerleading in popular culture. Author Christine Ro writes, "the popular image of cheerleading was still very much of the minimally dressed female cheerleader on the sidelines of a male sports event. This was the image radical cheerleaders seized upon in order to subvert gender messages while serving up peppy support for social justice causes."

== Gender non-conformity ==
Gender non-conformity is a foundation upon which the subculture of radical cheerleading developed. Since its creation, radical cheerleading has been a movement open to all: participants may be male, female, transgender, non-binary or non-gender identified. Often, radical cheerleaders subvert gender norms through costuming and aesthetics. According to author and radical cheerleader Jeanne Vaccaro, the movement was responsible for "cultivating a queer sensibility."

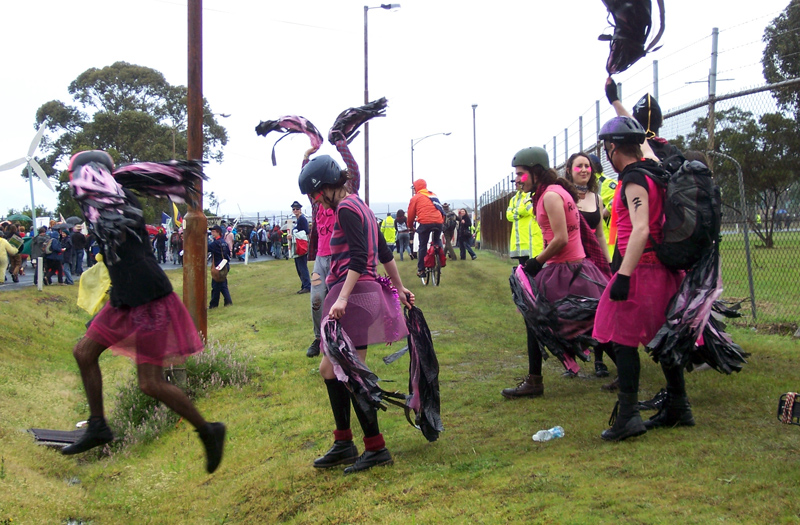

== Aesthetics ==
Radical cheerleaders reappropriate the aesthetics of cheerleading, sometimes in an ironic fashion. Radical cheerleaders dress in diverse ways. Radical cheerleading is often marked by a DIY aesthetic, with handmade costumes and props. Some radical cheerleaders make pom-poms using garbage bags by folding them in half, tying off one side with a rubber band and then cutting strips from the other end.

Every squad has a unique aesthetic of its own. The Dirty Southern Belles, from Memphis, Tennessee, wear the colors pink and black to cheer for gay pride. The Pirate Cheerleaders, a squad from Milwaukee, wear black skirts with white pleats, and shirts with pirate logos when performing at basement punk shows. The New Paltz Rads, a squad from the State University of New York at New Paltz, sport signature colors black and red.

== Notable demonstrations ==
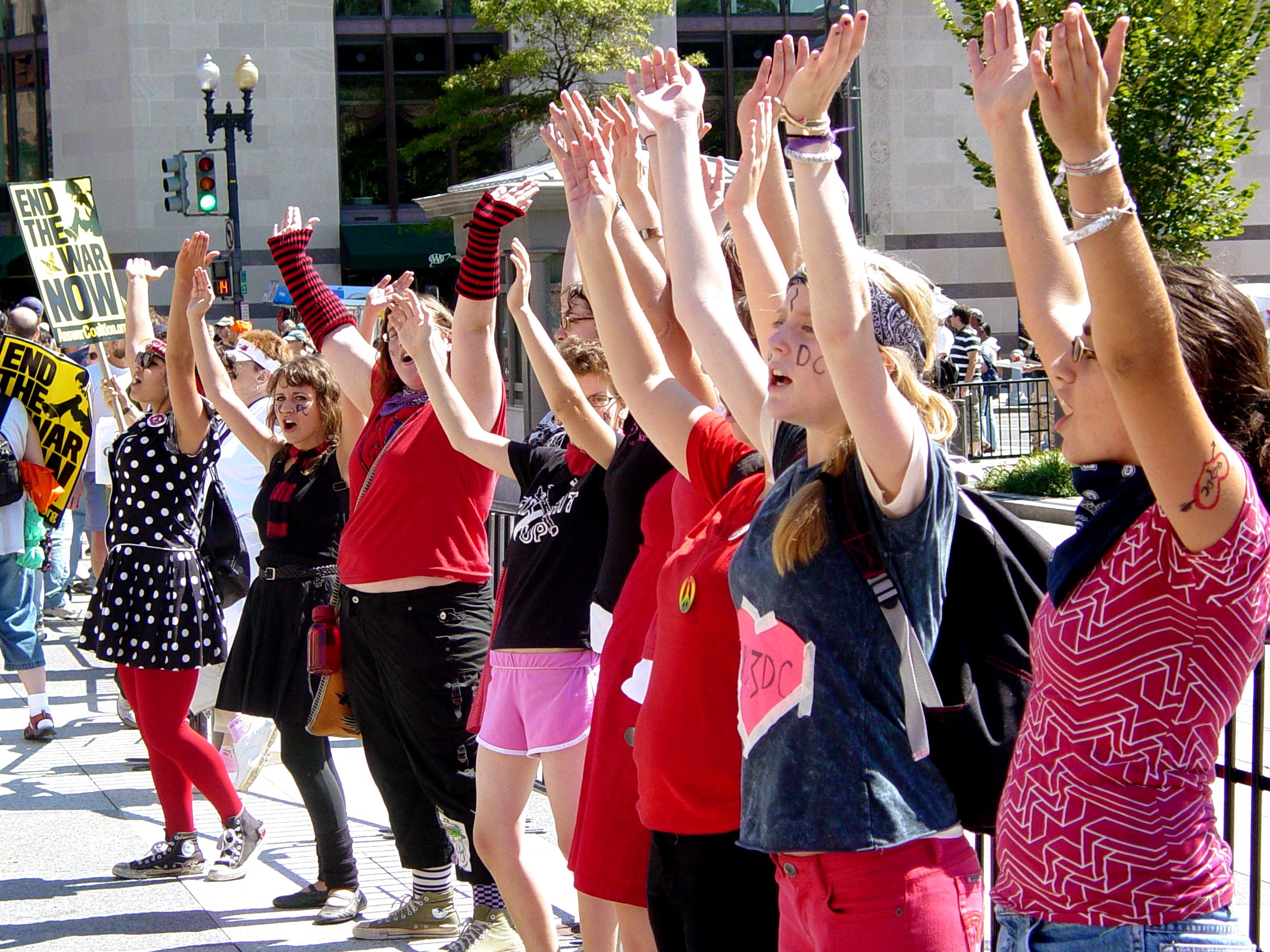

Radical cheerleaders often perform at political demonstrations, festivals and other feminist events, where they lead protest chants. Radical cheerleading is used at demonstrations to promote political messages in a media-friendly, people-friendly way. Radical cheerleaders may also perform on stage at music venues, to bring political issues (as well as entertainment) to an unsuspecting crowd.

A notable demonstration took place at a Taco Bell restaurant in Auburn, Alabama in 2001, where radical cheerleaders gathered to protest for fair wages. Dubbed the "Taco Bell Protest," participants explained to police that the purpose of their demonstration was to protest the business relationship between corporate Taco Bell and the Six L's Packing Company, Inc., a firm that pays employees low wages with zero benefits.

Radical cheerleaders demonstrated at the 2004 Republican National Convention in New York, the March for Women's Lives in Washington, D.C., on April 25, 2004, and The Resistin' Radicatz, a radical cheerleading squad, performed at the 2004 Million Worker March.

== Cheer content ==
Cheers are usually written from scratch or by rewriting the words of popular and historic songs. The first radical cheer book was published in 1997.

An example of a radical cheer, led by creator Cara Jennings, performed at the 2004 Republican National Convention in New York:

Sound off! I don't wanna work anymore! What did you say? I said the system doesn't work anymore! What did you say? I said STOMP, smash the state, Let's liberate, Acknowledge me or go to hell, another womyn to rebel, let's liberate, Stomp, smash the state, let's liberate, organize and raise some hell, act up, unite and rebel!

An example of a cheer performed by the Radical Teen Cheer Squad: "We're teens, we're cute, we're radical to boot! We're angry, we're tough, and we have had enough!"

== Media ==
In Give Me An F: Radical Cheerleading and Feminist Performance, radical cheerleader and Author Jeanne Vaccaro describes the process of archiving radical cheerleading through the examination of cheers, zines, photographs and personal testimony from fellow radical cheerleader Mary Xmas.

In a speech at the National Women's Studies Association in 2004, feminist magazine director Lisa Jervis placed radical cheerleading within a tradition of playful feminist comment on popular culture.

In August 2004 the New York City Radical Cheerleaders completed Don't Let the System Get You Down—Cheer Up, a video documentary of the Radical Cheerblock at the March for Women's Lives. The video was released in time to celebrate and honor and inspire the hundreds of radical cheerleaders who converged in New York to protest the Republican National Convention.

== Responses ==
Radical cheerleading is a style of performance, and is inherently defined by the element of spectacle. Responses within the media have ranged from positive to negative. Sheila Noone, the editorial director of American Cheerleader magazine, commented that cheerleaders are involved in an "uphill battle" towards gaining respect, asserting that radical cheerleading makes this even more difficult. In contrast, Lauren Jack, member of Harvard University's Cheerleading squad, made the statement that cheerleading is "all about trying to get everyone else excited about your causes, so it's perfect for political activism."

== See also ==
- Anarcha-feminism
- The arts and politics
- Gender bender
- Mary Christmas, one of the founding members of New York City's Radical Cheerleaders
- Politics and sports
- Raging Grannies
- Women's International League for Peace and Freedom
