= Diet for a New America (film) =

Diet for a New America: Your Health, Your Planet
- Directed by: Ed Schuman
- Starring: John Robbins; Michael Klaper; T. Colin Campbell; John A. McDougall
- Distributed by: KCET
- Release date: September 1991
- Country: United States
- Language: English

Diet for a New America: Your Health, Your Planet is a 1991 American documentary film based on the 1987 book Diet for a New America by John Robbins. It links the impacts of factory farming on human health, animal welfare and the environment, and generally advocates a vegetarian diet. The film is narrated by Robbins and features interviews with Dr. Michael Klaper, Professor T. Colin Campbell, and Dr. John A. McDougall.

The film was produced by KCET, the Los Angeles PBS affiliate, and aired in several cities including Seattle and San Francisco.

== See also ==
- List of vegan and plant-based media
