= Richard Baskin =

American film composer and producer

- Born: Aaron Richard Baskin; December 1, 1948 (age 77); Pasadena, California, US
- Occupations: Film producer, film composer
- Partner: Barbra Streisand (1983–1987)
- Parent(s): Burt Baskin, Shirley Baskin
- Family: Edie Baskin (sister); Irv Robbins (uncle); John Robbins (cousin); Isadore Familian (stepfather)

Aaron Richard Baskin (born December 1, 1948) is an American film composer and producer, best known as the musical director and producer of the Academy Award winning soundtrack for the Robert Altman film Nashville, and other creative film scores in the 1970s and 1980s. He eventually became a film director, directing music videos for Barbra Streisand, Rod Stewart, Elton John, and many others, as well as feature films. He produced Elton John's concert special, Elton John Live at the Greek Theatre, with Ray Cooper. Collaborating again, he wrote and directed Elton John's music video for Disney's The Lion King, "The Circle of Life".

In the mid-1990's, he was a pioneer of streaming video, and co-founded Intertainer, the first broadband video-on-demand program service in the U.S. While chairman of that company, he co-authored key patents and technology fundamental to streaming video that are widely used today in all major streaming services. He is a long-time environmental activist, and founding board director of the LA Waterkeeper, and other private philanthropies. He lives in Santa Monica, California, and Sun Valley, Idaho.

== Biography ==
=== Personal life ===
Baskin was born to a Jewish family (of Russian-Jewish and Polish-Jewish ancestry) in Pasadena, California, to the Baskin-Robbins co-founder Burt Baskin and his wife Shirley Robbins (sister of co-founder Irv Robbins). His mother remarried to Isadore Familian. His sister, Edie Baskin, served as the official photographer for Saturday Night Live from the show's premiere in 1975 until 1999.

Baskin was in a relationship with Barbra Streisand from November 1983 to October 1987.

=== Career ===
Two years after Nashville was released, Baskin was the musical guest on the March 12, 1977, episode during the second season of Saturday Night Live with host Sissy Spacek.

In 1985, Baskin produced and arranged tracks on Barbra Streisand's The Broadway Album. Baskin also wrote music for a film based on that music, Welcome to L.A., composed the score for Robert Altman's Buffalo Bill and the Indians, or Sitting Bull's History Lesson, James at 16 and UFOria. He was musical director and produced soundtracks for other films such as Honeysuckle Rose, starring Willie Nelson, and The Best Little Whorehouse in Texas, directed by Colin Higgins.
