= Robyn Few =

American sex workers' rights activist (1958–2012)

- Born: October 7, 1958; Paducah, Kentucky, US
- Died: September 13, 2012 (aged 53)
- Occupation: Sex work activist
- Known for: Founder of Sex Workers Outreach Project USA (SWOP-USA)

Robyn Few (October 7, 1958 – September 13, 2012) was an American sex workers' rights activist who worked for the decriminalization of prostitution, against violence targeted at sex workers, and, generally, for the improvement of sex workers' working conditions. A former prostitute, she founded and directed the Sex Workers Outreach Project USA (SWOP-USA), and helped organize the annual International Day to End Violence Against Sex Workers.

== Early life and career ==
Few was born in Paducah, Kentucky. According to her biography on SWOP's website, she had worked as an exotic dancer, then pursued a college degree in theater, and was active in the medical marijuana movement in California. She first began working as a prostitute in a professional capacity in 1996, but was a sex worker all her life, beginning with survival sex work as a thirteen-year-old runaway.

In June 2002, she was arrested by an FBI SWAT team. She pleaded guilty to a charge of conspiracy to promote prostitution in December 2002, and received a sentence of 6 months' house arrest and three years' probation in November 2003.

== Campaigning ==
She founded SWOP-USA in October 2003, and the first International Day to End Violence Against Sex Workers was organized in December of that year.

In 2004, she designed a ballot initiative in Berkeley, California ("Measure Q") that would have called for the city government to lobby for the decriminalization of prostitution at the state level, and would have instructed city police to cease sting operations and treat prostitution arrests with the lowest priority. The initiative failed, receiving 37% of the vote.

In an interview in 2007, she defended the decision of prosecuted "D.C. Madam" Deborah Jeane Palfrey to name high-class clients of her erotic service, arguing that, "with the potential to drag many power brokers into the spotlight, Palfrey's revelations could serve as a turning point in the effort to decriminalize prostitution".

She advocated the complete removal of prostitution from criminal codes, and disapproved of a legalization model as in Nevada.

For the International Day to End Violence Against Sex Workers, December 17, 2008, she helped lead a march in Washington, D.C. Many attendees spoke about their own experiences with violence.

== Death ==
Few died after a long struggle with cancer in September 2012.
