= Million Worker March =

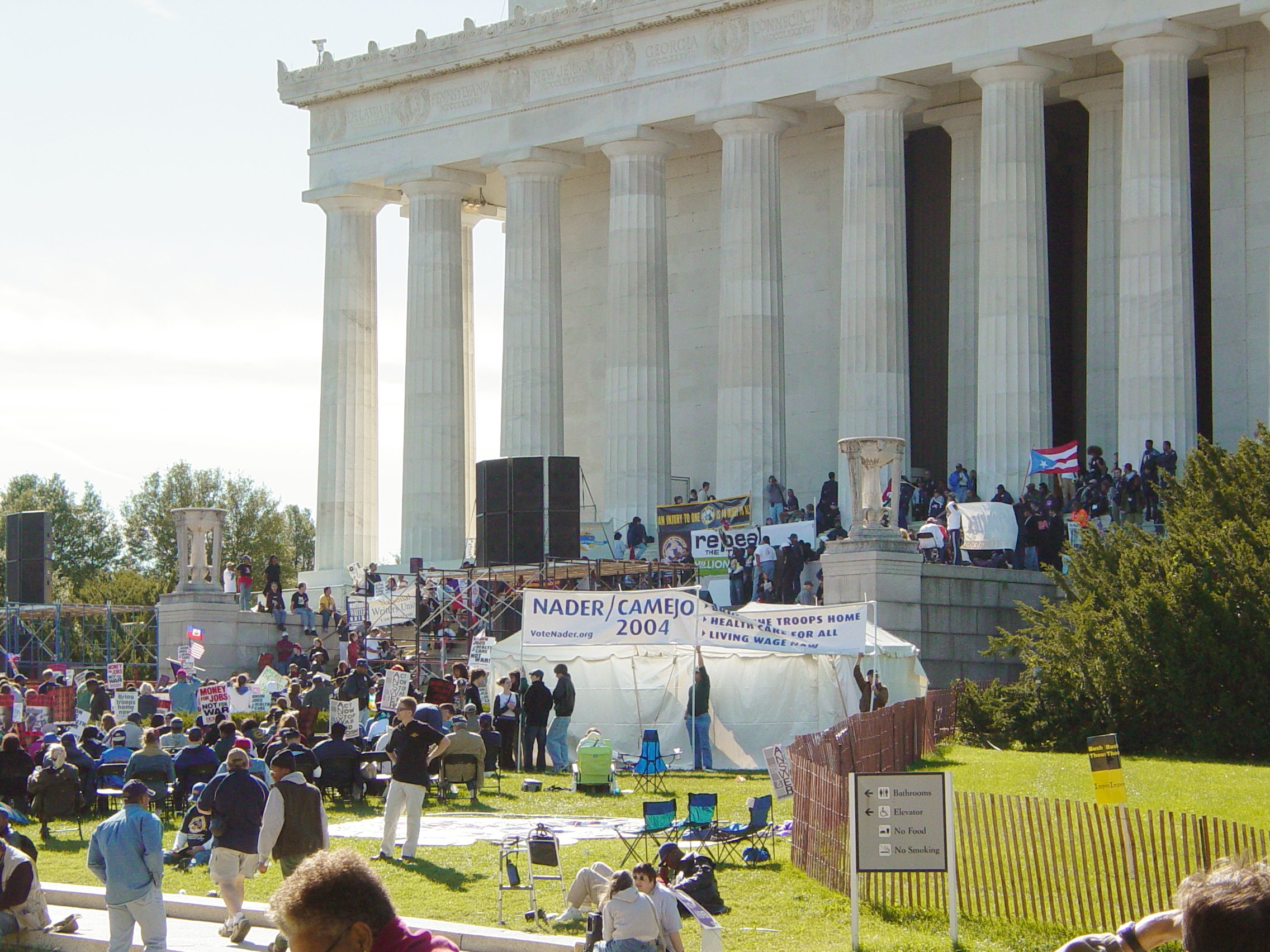
The Million Worker March on the steps of the Lincoln Memorial.

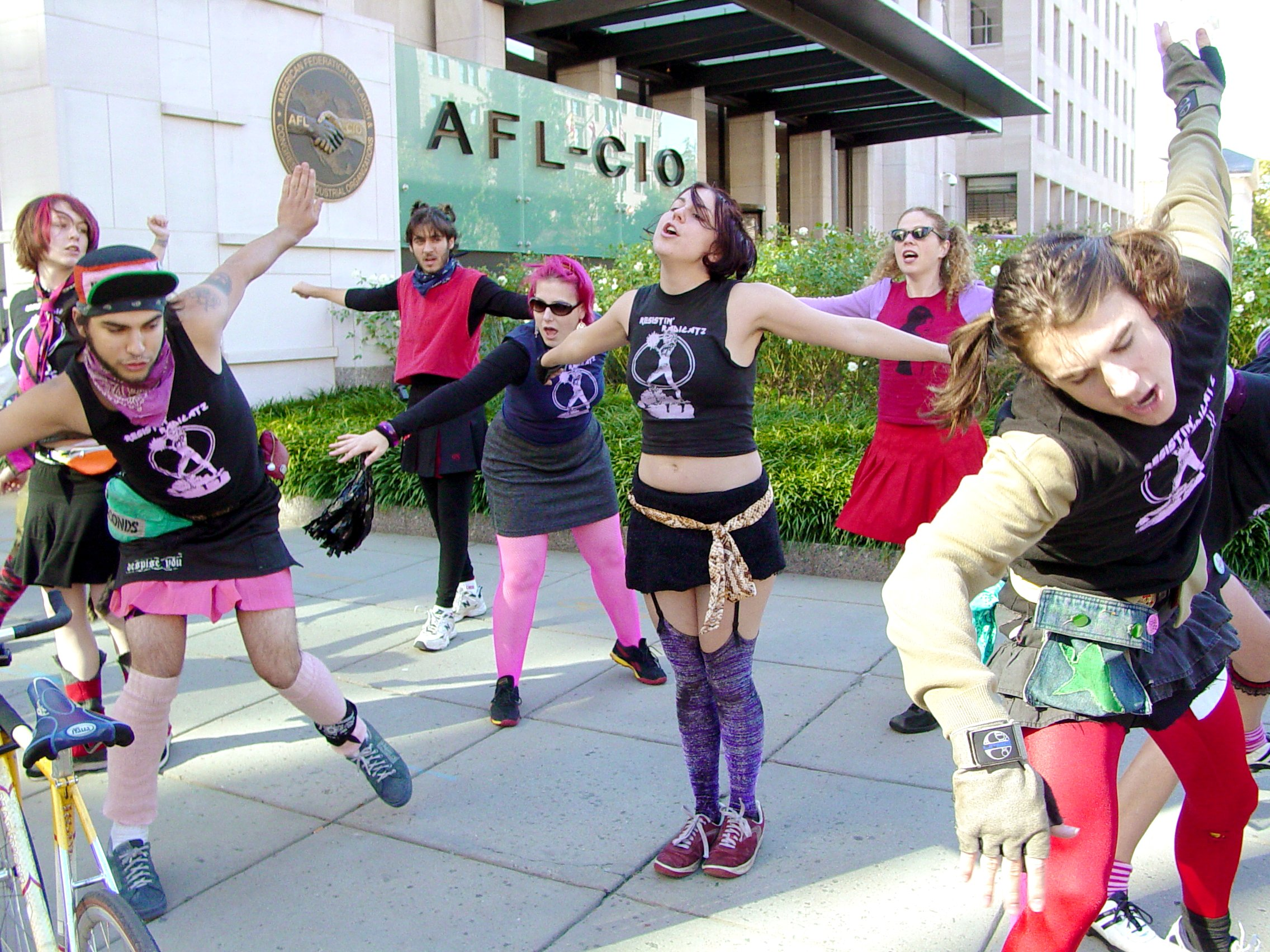
The Resistin Radicatz perform a cheer in front of the AFL–CIO headquarters before joining the main march.

The Million Worker March was a rally against perceived attacks upon working families in America and what organizers described as millions of jobs lost during the Bush administration with the complicity of the Congress of the United States.

The Million Worker March took place on October 17, 2004 in Washington, D.C. An estimated 10,000 demonstrators spent the day on the steps of the Lincoln Memorial listening to speeches and discussing various issues. Organizers presented an array of demands from better wages to an end to the war in Iraq.

Standing where his father gave his "I have a dream" speech, Martin Luther King III told the crowd that civil rights, workers and anti-war activists must come together in common cause.

== Organization and support ==
The Million Worker March was primarily organized by the International Longshore and Warehouse Union. Although the ILWU was affiliated with the AFL–CIO and the Canadian Labour Congress, neither national trade union officially endorsed the rally.

Based on local union endorsements, organizers estimated that they were representing about 3.5 million workers.

A diverse group of organizations supported the Million Worker March. Global Exchange and the Rainforest Action Network backed the demonstration. The rally also garnered backing from many celebrities like Coretta Scott King, Danny Glover, Jesse Jackson and Chumbawamba.

In addition to the ILWU, several other unions and labor/community groups in the United States supported the event, reflecting the broad scope of labor participation: National Education Association (NEA); American Postal Workers Union (APWU); SEIU Local 1199; AFSCME; National Coalition of Black Trade Unionists.

== Demands ==
Organizers called for universal health care, a national living wage, guaranteed pensions for all working people, an end to the outsourcing of jobs overseas, a repeal of the Patriot Act, increased funding for public education, free mass transit in every city, a reduction of the military budget and cancellation of pro-corporation pacts.

== Participants ==
The movement invited all working-class people to come to Washington, D.C. The leaders claimed a sense of urgency to solve problems that plagued working families immediately instead of idly waiting for the end of the George W. Bush administration. Many participants carried signs with slogans like, "Bush lied, thousands died" and "More money for jobs, not war".

== Context and Direction ==
Some sources speak of a disagreement between the organizers of the Million Worker March and the official leadership of the labor unions, especially the AFL-CIO. This suggests that the movement was more than just a routine event, but rather an independent labor movement with a specific program that even went against the positions of the union leadership. Critics and sections of the official labor movement, such as the AFL-CIO, refused to commit resources and official support to the march, believing that the union's energy should be used for other political purposes.

== Historical Review and Ideological Roots ==
Many followers of the march have described it as a continuation of the labor protests of previous decades, as well as inspired by civil and protest movements—with a focus on protesting economic policies, globalization, and wars.

== Confrontation with Official Union and AFL-CIO Leadership ==
While planning for the March, the AFL-CIO leadership officially instructed members not to support or fund the march, and this opposition reflects some of the internal tensions within the labor movement at the time.

== See also ==
- Labor movement
- UNITE HERE
- List of protest marches on Washington, D.C.
