= $pread =

Independent magazine for sex workers

- An example of a typical issue of $pread
- Editor: Mary Christmas & Audacia Ray
- Categories: Feminism
- Frequency: Quarterly
- Publisher: The Feminist Press
- Founder: Rachel Aimee, Rebecca Lynn, and Raven Strega
- First issue: March 15, 2005
- Final issue: January 2011

$pread was a quarterly magazine by and for sex workers and those who support their rights. The magazine's focus was: "personal experiences and political insights" and it "contain(ed) practical information like news, features, health columns, and resources related to the sex industry".

== History ==
Articles were written by readers as well as by figures from academic, cultural, and literary backgrounds, most of whom were current or former sex workers. The magazine was launched on March 15, 2005 by Rachel Aimee, Rebecca Lynn, and Raven Strega. $pread was based in New York City, and was sold throughout the United States and Canada at independent bookstores and via national distributors.

A co-editor said, "We want the general public to become aware of issues such as the physical working conditions of sex workers and their health care and housing needs, and to start considering sex workers as real people rather than mythical beasts who only come to life when someone drops a quarter into a slot."

$pread published personal experiences, political insights, and contained practical information, such as news, features, health columns, and sex industry resources. $pread supported the sex work community by donating 15% of each print run to the workplaces of and the outreach organizations utilized by sex workers. The tax outreach program "helps sex workers who don't know they can and should file taxes", said Audacia Ray, an executive editor at the magazine.

As of August 30, 2010, $pread ceased printed publication due to both financial issues and not having enough people to keep the operation running, even if "there was $100k made available".

== Criticism ==
Because $pread was part of the sex workers rights movement, it was criticized by some branches of feminism that believe that sex work is inherently degrading:

Among feminists, perceptions are no less polarized – sex workers are either fully empowered agents using their sexuality in unassailably positive ways, or victims of a job that degrades them by its very nature. Most feminist dialogues about sex work sound more like monologues; defensiveness, mischaracterizations, and willful ignorance abound, making casualties of complexity and nuance.

== $pread book ==
The Feminist Press released a collection of some of the articles and essays from the original publications of the magazine into a 368-page book on the 15th March 2015 entitled $pread : The Best of the Magazine that Illuminated the Sex Industry and Started a Media Revolution.

== Mary Christmas ==
"Mary Christmas" is a pseudonym of Emily O'Hara, an activist and a former editor of $pread magazine, a New York-based magazine on sex industry workers' rights. She was also involved in Radical Cheerleaders, a group of leftist activists who cheer in squads at protests.
