= Sex Workers Outreach Project USA =

American national social justice network

- Formation: August 13, 2003; 23 years ago
- Founder: Robyn Few
- Region served: United States
- Leader: Liz Coplen
- Website: swopusa.org

Sex Workers Outreach Project-USA (SWOP-USA) is a national social justice network dedicated to the fundamental human rights of sex workers and their communities, focusing on ending violence and stigma through education and advocacy. SWOP might be considered a constructive program by nonviolent scholars and activists, as it attempts to create more imaginative and just communities, especially considering its focus on equality and education through advocacy. The organization was founded by Robyn Few on August 13, 2003, and their first major action was to organize the first annual International Day to End Violence Against Sex Workers (December 17) with the Green River Memorial for the victims of Gary Ridgway, the "Green River Killer".

== History ==
The original Sex Workers Outreach Project (SWOP) was founded in Australia and the United States (US) SWOP has developed into the largest sex worker rights organization in the country, with chapters active in various places.

== Activities ==
SWOP Sacramento was established by Kristen DiAngelo and Stacey Swimme on June 27, 2014, and is dedicated to reducing harm, improving healthcare, and upholding both the civil and human rights of sex workers and their communities. Its focus is on ending violence and stigma through education and advocacy. It addresses the health and well-being of both trafficking victims and those engaged in survival sex. In conjunction with Safer Alternatives through Networking and Education (SANE), SWOP Sacramento conducted a needs assessment of sex workers in Sacramento. It found significant problems with homelessness, trafficking and survival sex by an underserved population.

SWOP Pittsburgh (or SWOP PGH) is the local chapter of Pittsburgh, Pennsylvania, started in 2018 by Jessie Sage, Moriah Ella Mason, and PJ Sage amid "an increasingly conservative political climate." Mason is a former stripper and currently an artist, massage therapist, and educator. Jessie Sage, formerly a PhD student, grew frustrated with academia and left to become a doula. PJ Sage, Jessie's husband, is currently a professor studying web camming and sex camming.

Aside from these community-building events, SWOP PGH has also been involved with various legal and political issues in Pittsburgh. In Allegheny County, Pennsylvania, dozens of prostitution arrests and cases in 2017 involved the weaponization of women's cell phones. Chapter organizer Gabrielle Monroe claimed that phones are vital to the safety of sex workers, and they should not be charged with "possessing instruments of crime" in these scenarios. Similarly, condoms were also being weaponized against sex workers as "instruments of crime," and SWOP PGH along with various partners in the city successfully advocated for the removal of this legal implication. SWOP PGH originally wrote a letter to the Allegheny County District Attorney, Stephen Zappala, Jr., pleading for something to be done.

== See also ==
- Decriminalizing sex work
- Sex worker movements
- Prostitution and the law
- Sex workers' rights
