= Pfister (firm) =

Plumbing fixtures company

- Type: Subsidiary
- Industry: Plumbing fixtures
- Founded: 1910
- Founders: Emil Price; William Pfister
- Parent: Assa Abloy
- Website: pfisterfaucets.com

Pfister, called Price Pfister until 2010, is an American manufacturer of bathroom and lavatory faucets, shower systems, showerheads and accessories, kitchen faucets and other plumbing fixtures. Emil Price and William Pfister founded the company in 1910. Today, Pfister is owned by Swedish Assa Abloy.

== History ==
Price Pfister was founded by Emil Price and William Pfister in Los Angeles in 1910, when the company introduced its first product, a garden faucet. Over the next decade, Price Pfister’s product line expanded to include other types of faucets, valves and hose nozzles for indoor sinks and bathtubs. Aside from producing plumbing fixtures, during World War I and World War II, Price Pfister produced military items such as aircraft fittings and hand grenade shells.

In 1941, the firm was purchased by Isadore Familian. During the postwar housing boom in the late 1940s, Price Pfister began to specialize in residential products. The company became a household name after the widespread popularity of their Crown Jewel faucet line in 1950. From 1960 to 1970, Price Pfister accelerated in growth, starting with the construction of a 25-acre (10 ha) manufacturing plant in Pacoima, California, which became the largest foundry West of the Mississippi. In 1969, Price Pfister was acquired by Norris Industries, Inc.

Price Pfister is still remembered for its tagline playing off the distinctive company name: "Price Pfister, the Pfabulous Pfaucet with the Pfunny name". By 1987, Price Pfister had gained 14% of the U.S. faucet market. Two years later, Price Pfister was acquired by the Black and Decker Corporation. In 1994, Price Pfister became the first manufacturer to convert to ceramic cartridges, which enabled the industry’s first lifetime guarantee against leaks and drips.

=== Pacoima plant closure ===
In January 1996, Price Pfister agreed to a $2.4 million settlement in a California lawsuit against their manufacturing method which introduced amounts of lead into their faucets that were in excess of those legally allowed under California's Safe Drinking Water and Toxic Enforcement Act of 1986. The state sued more than 20 faucet manufacturers, with laboratory tests showing that Price Pfister had the second-highest amount of lead in their faucets. They were forced to change their process from antiquated sand-casting to machining, which is more expensive. Rival manufacturer Chicago Faucets still used sand-casting as well, but switched to using bismuth over lead as a sealing alloy, allowing them to keep jobs within the United States. Other rivals such as Delta had long since switched their U.S. plants to more advanced forms of manufacturing.

In 1996, Price Pfister shut down its foundry in the U.S. as they began moving jobs to Mexico, laying off 300 of the 1200 U.S. workers at their plant in Pacoima, California. To protest the layoffs and limited severance packages, ten of the workers went on hunger strikes, and on day ten of the strike one of them collapsed and required medical attention. The company blamed the cutbacks on state regulations that limited the amount of lead allowed in faucets. A local labor activist group leader stated that the company was "using environmental issues as a scapegoat" since rival companies had already managed to improve their manufacturing within the U.S. The Teamsters local negotiator claimed that the move was due in part to the cheaper cost of labor in Mexico, stating that the wages at the plant were $17 an hour including benefits, while in Mexico the wages were $1 or less. The new president, Ron Cooper, stated that the remaining 900 jobs might soon be moved as well, since the Pacoima plant would be too large for their needs. Regardless of where they moved, the 450 factory workers would be laid off and a new staff would be hired.

In March 1997, Price Pfister moved more of its manufacturing operations from the Pacoima plant to Mexicali, Mexico, laying off approximately 300 U.S. workers. Many of the former workers protested the layoffs outside the plant, and later called for a boycotting of Price Pfister while protesting a nearby Home Depot, a home improvement store that sold Price Pfister products.

The Pacoima plant closed down completely in 1997. In 2005, Lowe's planned to build a home improvement store on the lot of the former plant. LA Weekly writer Steven Mikulan said that the move was ironic: the plant used to serve as a hub where U.S.-made Price Pfister products were shipped out from, and the place would instead now be selling those items received from elsewhere. The plant was once the city's largest employer and left the area with severe amounts of pollution. After its closing a survey found that 28% of nearby residents had chronic respiratory problems.

=== Spectrum Brands Holdings ===
Joining Kwikset security hardware in 1999, Price Pfister and Kwikset formed the Black and Decker Hardware and Home Improvement Group, based in Lake Forest, California. Following the 2010 Stanley acquisition of Black and Decker, Price Pfister became part of the Stanley Black and Decker Hardware and Home Improvement Group. Following the merger, Price Pfister changed its name to simply Pfister.

On October 9, 2012, The Wall Street Journal reported that Stanley Black & Decker had agreed to sell its Hardware and Home Improvement Group, including Pfister, to Spectrum Brands Holdings. The acquisition was completed on December 17, 2012, for $1.4 billion.

=== Sale to Assa Abloy ===
In 2021, Spectrum Brands agreed to sell its Hardware and Home Improvement (HHI) division to Assa Abloy. The deal closed in June 2023.

== Products ==
Pfister's retail bath and kitchen fixtures are available in major hardware and home improvement stores and showrooms throughout North America. Pfister products' price range generally is somewhat lower than those of competitors such as Moen and Delta, but higher than those of private label brands such as The Home Depot's Glacier Bay and Delta's low-cost Peerless brand. Besides residential products, Pfister also manufactures a custom-designed fixture faucet line, PFISTER Custom Faucet Solutions, for the hospitality industry.
