= Burt Baskin =

American businessman (1913–1967)

Burton Baskin
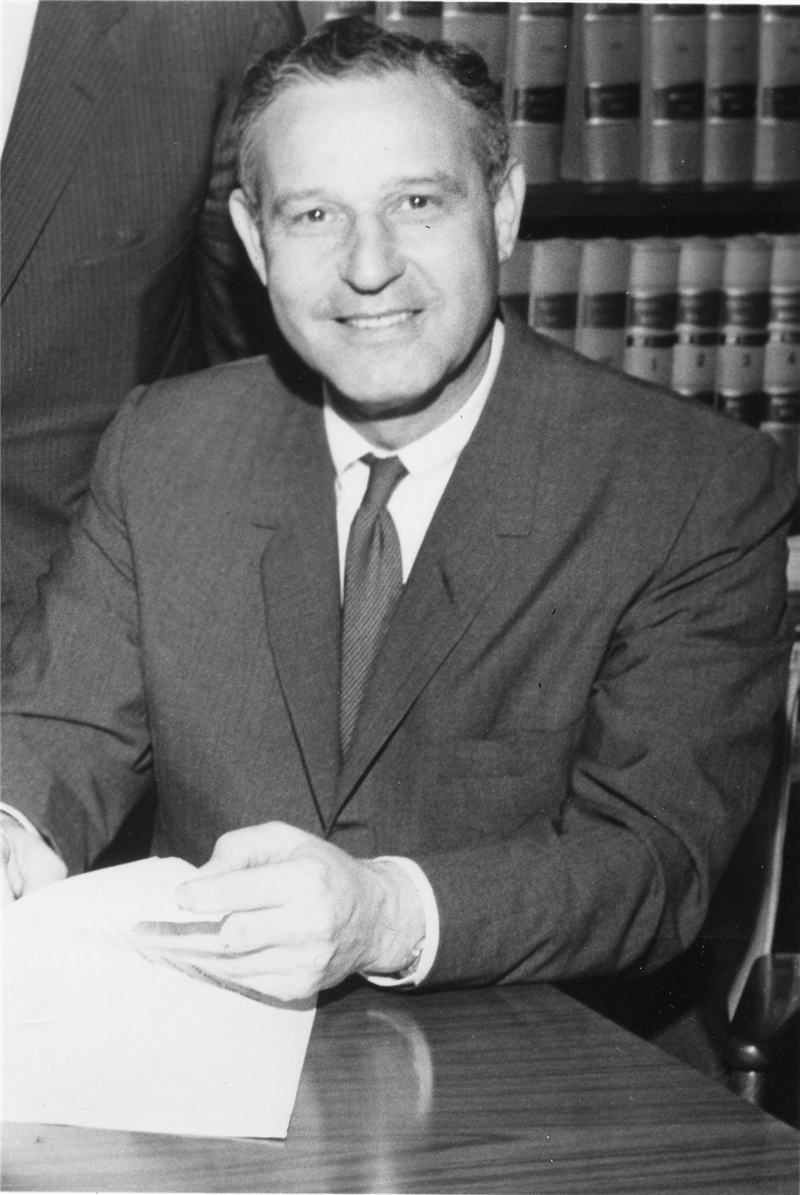
- Born: Burton Leo Baskin; December 17, 1913; Streator, Illinois, U.S.
- Died: December 24, 1967 (aged 54); Los Angeles, California, U.S.
- Education: University of Illinois Urbana-Champaign
- Occupation: Businessman
- Years active: 1935−1967
- Known for: Co-founded the Baskin-Robbins ice cream chain
- Spouse: Shirley Robbins (m. 1942)
- Children: 3
- Relatives: Irv Robbins (brother-in-law); John Robbins (nephew); Richard "Skip" Bronson (son-in-law)

Burton Leo Baskin (December 17, 1913 – December 24, 1967) was an American businessman who co-founded the Baskin-Robbins ice cream parlor chain in 1946 with business partner and brother-in-law Irv Robbins.

== Early life ==
Burt Baskin was born in 1913 in Streator, Illinois, the youngest child of Russian and Polish Jewish immigrants Harold Baskin and Ida (Chaya) Surie Baskin, who had emigrated in the 1890s from Smolensk, Russia, and Łomża, Poland, respectively. He had three brothers: Bernard, Albert, and Lester, and a sister, Florence. His father owned Baskin's clothing store in Streator for about 35 years until retiring in 1938.

Burt graduated from Streator Township High School in 1931 and from the University of Illinois in 1935 and was a member of the Zeta Beta Tau fraternity.

== Business career ==
Baskin owned a men's store in the Palmer House in Chicago, and married Irv Robbins' sister Shirley in 1942. He had enlisted in the Navy. He served with Patrol Wing 1 (Later renamed Fleet Air Wing 1) in Espiritu Santo, Vanuatu, in 1942–43, was released from service early in 1946 and came to California, where Robbins had been operating Snowbird Ice Cream in Glendale. Robbins convinced him that selling ice cream was more fun than selling men's ties and shirts, and within a couple of months he opened Burton's Ice Cream at 561 So. Lake in Pasadena.

By 1948, the five Snowbird and three Burton's shops had been combined into a single enterprise, and they had devised their 31st flavor—Chocolate Mint. The partners came to the conclusion that because of the new stores they had opened, they were devoting less and less time to each individual store. "That's when we hit on selling our stores to our managers", Robbins said in the 1985 Los Angeles Times story. "Without realizing it at the time, we were in the franchise business before the word 'franchise' was fashionable. We opened another store and another and another ..." They made an agreement with the new store owners, which became "franchise agreements" and they became the first food company ever to franchise their outlets. The idea took hold in other retail establishments, and the age of "franchising" was underway.

In 1949, with more than 40 stores, Baskin and Robbins purchased their first dairy in Burbank, allowing them "to have complete control over the production of their ice cream, and the development of new ingredients and flavors."

In 1953, they decided to unite Snowbird and Burton's under one name: Baskin-Robbins, deciding the order of their names with a coin toss. The "31 flavors" concept was introduced that same year to bring attention to a deep menu that featured a flavor for every day of the month.

The company had 43 stores by the end of 1949, more than 100 by 1960 and about 500 when the ice cream empire was sold to United Fruit Company for an estimated $12 million in 1967. Robbins stayed involved with the company for 11 more years and retired in 1978. Twenty-five years later, Baskin-Robbins had become the world's largest chain of ice cream stores, with 5,500 outlets around the world.

== Personal life ==
Baskin and Robbins met in 1941 when Baskin began dating Irv's sister, Shirley Robbins, whom he married in Tacoma, Washington, in 1942. He served as a Lieutenant Commander of Naval Reserve in the South Pacific during World War II. They had two children: Edie and Richard Baskin.

Baskin died from a heart attack at his home in Studio City, California, on December 24, 1967, aged 54. He was interred at Home of Peace Cemetery.
