= Audacia Ray =

American human sexuality writer (born 1980)

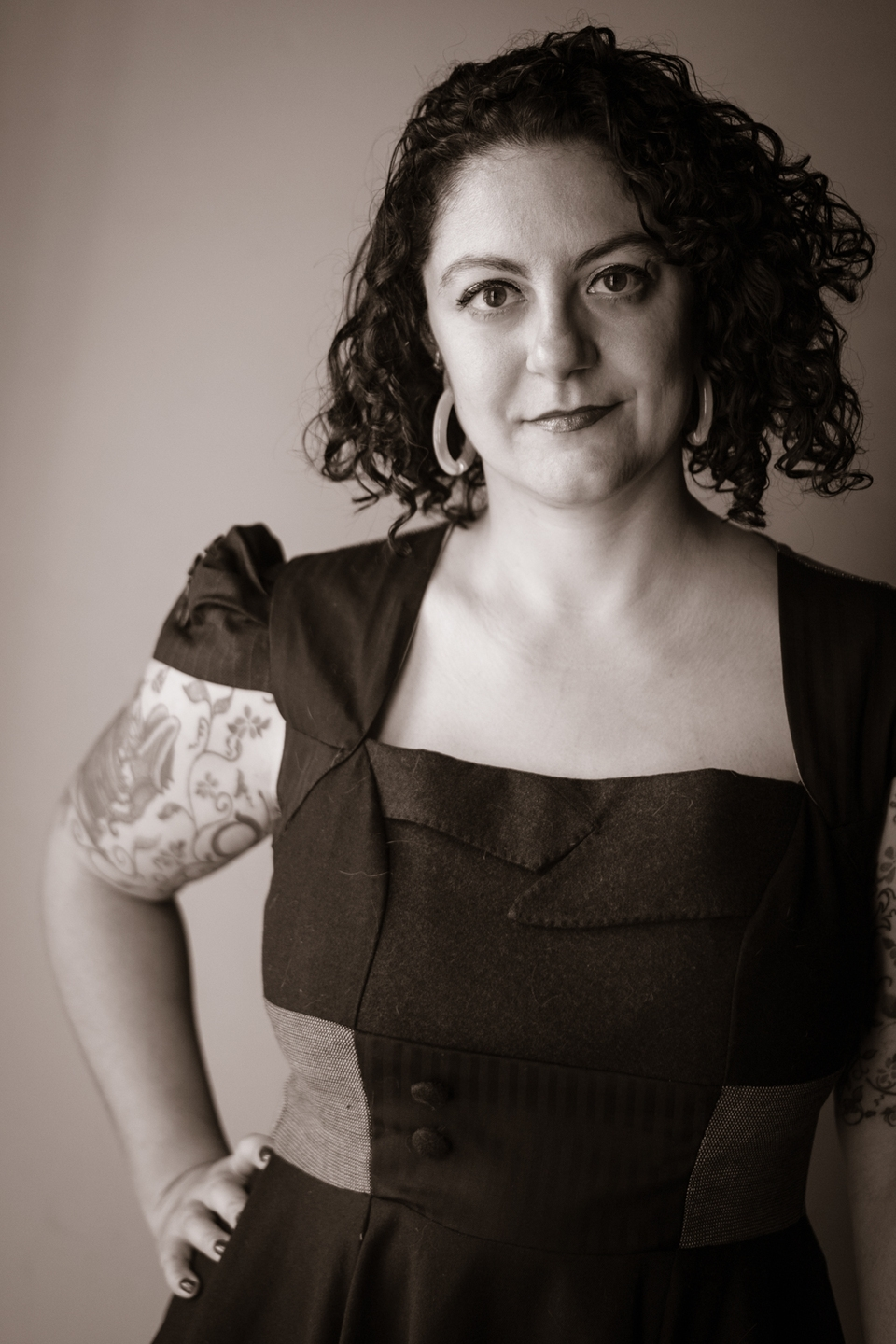
- Born: April 25, 1980 (age 46)
- Occupations: Sex worker rights activist, blogger, author, media pundit
- Known for: Founder of Red Umbrella Project

Audacia Ray (born April 25, 1980) is an American human sexuality and culture author, who focuses on the influences of modern technology. She is a former sex worker and a sex worker rights advocate. She leads media skills workshops intended to train sex workers to deal with interviews.

Ray's company, Waking Vixen Productions, which began as a personal blog in 2004, produces multi-media content in an effort to raise sexuality awareness taking advantage of social media technologies.

In 2010, Ray was named New York's Best Sex Blogger of the year by Village Voice.

== Early life and education ==
Ray has a bachelor's degree in Cultural Studies from the Eugene Lang College The New School for Liberal Arts of New School University (2002) and a master's degree in American Studies from Columbia University (2007).

== Career ==
After graduating from college, Ray chose to be a sex worker and would find clients through Craigslist. She says she retired from sex work in about 2006.

Ray founded a sex worker magazine, $pread Magazine, in 2004. She was an assistant curator for the Museum of Sex in 2002.

In 2007, she authored Naked on the Internet in order "to make people less afraid of the internet and what's going on, especially with women's sexuality", described as "a survey of what women are up to online" on the Internet television show Geek Entertainment TV hosted by Violet Blue.

Since 2008, Ray has served as the Program Officer for the Online Communications and Campaigns division of the International Women's Health Coalition. She was interviewed on CNN's Prime News regarding the sex scandal that resulted in Governor Eliot Spitzer's resignation from public office as well as being sourced for an article by Elizabeth Landau on the same issue. In 2010, she appeared on Fox News discussing the controversy over New York City schoolteacher and former sex worker Melissa Petro, who, later, sold a nonfiction book, "Shame on You: How to be a Woman in the Age of Mortification," to G. P. Putnam's Sons, a division of Penguin Random House, "for six figures".

In 2009, Ray was an adjunct professor of sexuality at Rutgers University in Newark, New Jersey.

In 2010, Ray founded the Red Umbrella Project (RedUP), a New York City company that aims to give public voices to sex workers. It has a podcast and hosts a monthly storytelling series in New York City, The Red Umbrella Diaries, where sex workers tell their personal stories. The Red Umbrella Project, which merged with Sex Work Awareness in 2011, also runs Speak Up! Workshops that train sex workers in media literacy and advocacy.

In 2010, Ray was involved with the Global Network of Sex Work Projects (NSWP).

== Selected works ==
- Naked on the Internet: Hookups, Downloads, and Cashing in on Internet Sexploration, 2007, ISBN 1-58005-209-6
- $pread : The Best of the Magazine that Illuminated the Sex Industry and Started a Media Revolution, 2015, ISBN 978-1558618725
