= Diet for a New America =

1987 book by John Robbins

- Author: John Robbins
- Language: English
- Genre: Non-fiction
- Publication date: 1987
- Publication place: United States

Diet for a New America is a 1987 book by John Robbins. The book links the impacts of factory farming on human health, animal welfare and the environment, in an "animal-rights, pro-environment, vegetarian message." In 1991, KCET produced it as the documentary, Diet for a New America: Your Health, Your Planet.

== Critical reception ==
Colman McCarthy and Cleveland Amory compared Diet for a New America to Rachel Carson's 1962 book Silent Spring. In an editorial for The Washington Post and Finger Lakes Times McCarthy writes: "Robbins has written a book that is the pioneering match of Aldo Leopold's Sand County Almanac, John Rawls' A Theory of Justice, and Rachel Carson's Silent Spring."

Marian Burros of The New York Times writes: "Much of what Mr. Robbins has to say about diet in this country is unremarkable: we eat too much meat and dairy products. Much of what Mr. Robbins has to say about the inhumane treatment of animals on factory farms is correct. But Mr. Robbins undermines his case by exaggerating; facts mix with factoids and anecdotes."

In 1990, the Phil Donahue Show featured celebrities and John Robbins talking about vegetarianism and Diet for a New America.

== Influence ==
In 1988, Robbins founded EarthSave, a non-profit organization promoting vegetarianism. Its purpose was to channel into action the reader response to Diet for a New America.

== Editions ==
In 2012, a 25th anniversary edition of the book was released in paperback, audiobook, and electronic formats.
