= Baskin-Robbins =

US international ice cream parlor chain

- Logo used since 2022
- Type: Subsidiary
- Industry: Food and Beverage Franchising Restaurants
- Founded: 1945; 81 years ago (as Snowbird Ice Cream); Glendale, California, U.S.
- Founders: Burt Baskin; Irv Robbins
- Headquarters: Canton, Massachusetts, U.S.
- Number of locations: 7,800+ (2024)
- Key people: Paul J. Brown; Jeird Grandinetti
- Products: Ice cream; Frozen beverages; Ice cream cakes; Frozen treats
- Parent: Inspire Brands
- Website: baskinrobbins.com

Baskin-Robbins, Inc. is an American multinational chain of ice cream and cake specialty shops owned by Inspire Brands. Baskin-Robbins was founded in 1945 by Burt Baskin and Irv Robbins in Glendale, California. Its headquarters are in Canton, Massachusetts, and shared with sibling brand Dunkin' Donuts. It is the world's largest chain of ice cream specialty stores, with more than 7,800 locations.

The company is known for its "31 flavors" slogan, with the idea that a customer could have a different flavor every day of any month. The logo includes a stylized "31" formed from the letters "B" and "R". The slogan came from the Carson-Roberts advertising agency (which later merged into Ogilvy & Mather) in 1953. The company has introduced more than 1,400 flavors since 1945, including the addition of vegan and non-dairy flavors in 2019.

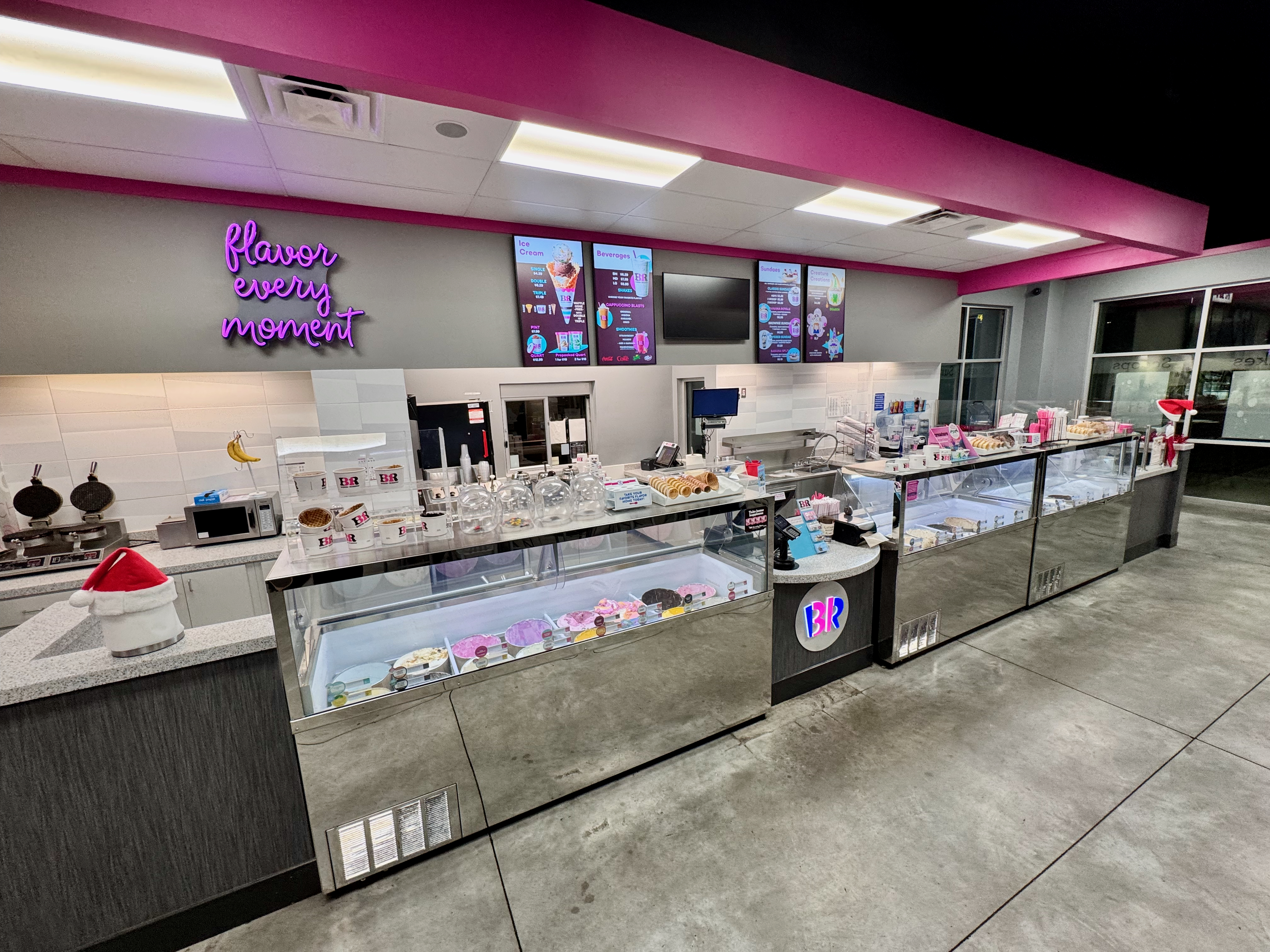
Interior of a Baskin-Robbins store in Ooltewah, Tennessee

== History ==
Throughout the 1940s in Southern California, Americans Burt Baskin and Irv Robbins independently opened shops selling ice cream. The pair were brothers-in-law, and both had experience working with ice cream: Robbins's father owned an ice cream shop where Robbins worked as a teenager, and Baskin had made ice cream for fellow navymen in World War II. In America at the time, consumers were very attached to three ice-cream flavors: chocolate, strawberry and vanilla, despite the efforts of another businessman, Howard Johnson.

Robbins opened his first store, Snowbird Ice Cream, in 1945 in Glendale, selling 21 flavors, then an unusual number of flavors. The following year, Baskin opened his first store in Pasadena, Burton's Ice Cream Shop. The pair quickly opened new stores and as of 1948 they collectively had 6 stores. By 1949, this had increased to over 40. By this point their businesses were associated, and that year, they purchased a dairy in Burbank to gain more control over production.

In 1953, the approach of separate brand identities was dropped, and the entity "Baskin-Robbins 31 Ice Cream" was created per the advice of the advertising firm Carson/Roberts. The order of their surnames was decided by a coin toss. The "31" referenced the number of flavors, chosen to permit the customer a new flavor each day of the month; some of these original flavors included Chocolate Mint, Black Walnut and Coffee Candy. Along with the original 31 flavors, Baskin-Robbins also offers seasonal flavors and flavors of the month such as America's Birthday Cake and Pumpkin Cheescake. As they expanded, the pair began franchising their stores, allowing them to reach to over 7,000 locations by 2012.

Beyond the large number of flavors, Baskin-Robbins was unusual for their stores decorated with clowns and pink and brown polka dots, intended to reflect a value of fun. Their stores also introduced small sampling spoons, an element which has since been replicated in many ice cream stores. Baskin-Robbins was different from old-fashioned ice cream parlors and soda fountains as they did not encourage customers to eat in their stores.

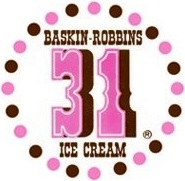
Original logo used from 1953 to 1980

Between 1949 and 1962, the corporate firm was known as Huntington Ice Cream Company. The name succeeded The Baskin-Robbins Partnership and was eventually changed back to Baskin-Robbins, Inc. on November 26, 1962. Baskin-Robbins was owned by its founders until 1967, just before Baskin's death, when it was acquired by the United Fruit Company for an estimated $12 million. In the 1970s, the chain expanded internationally, opening stores in Japan, Saudi Arabia, South Korea, and Australia.

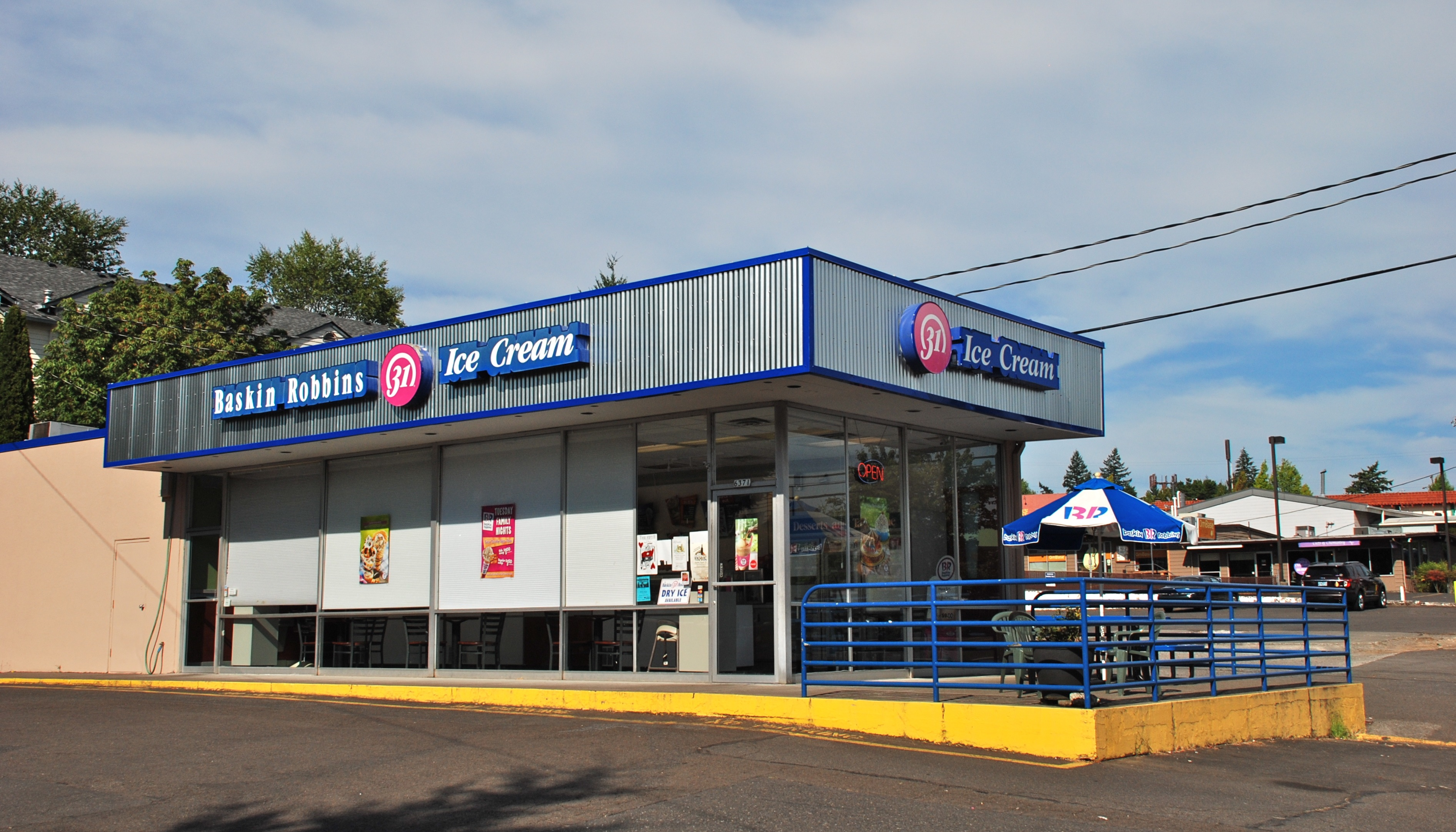
A 1967 Baskin-Robbins store in Portland, Oregon, with the 1991–2006 logo on August 8, 2013 (closed in mid-2014), that retained its original look, a design typical of the chain's outlets in the 1960s

In 1972, the company went public when United Brands sold 17% in an initial public offering. The next year, J. Lyons and Co. purchased Baskin-Robbins and all public stock. The firm then merged with Allied Breweries, becoming Allied-Lyons in 1978. In 1994, Allied-Lyons merged with Pedro Domecq S.A, becoming Allied Domecq. For the next year they remained under the control of Allied Domecq as part of Dunkin' Brands, Inc., made up of them and Dunkin' Donuts.

During the early 2000s, Baskin-Robbins struggled to retain business. In 2006, Dunkin' Brands was purchased by a group of private equity firms – Bain Capital, Thomas H. Lee Partners, and The Carlyle Group. That year, the company's "BR" logo was updated to highlight reference the number "31". In 2012, Dunkin' Brands became independent from the private equity firms. New stores opened in the mid-2010s, often co-branded with Dunkin' Donuts.

In 2014, Baskin-Robbins began selling ice cream in supermarkets for the first time in the U.S. Three years later, the brand began selling via delivery service platform DoorDash in 22 US cities. In December 2020, Dunkin' Brands was purchased by Inspire Brands. Baskin-Robbins debuted an updated logo, alongside the new tagline "Seize the Yay", in 2022. Chris Buck and Barack Obama are two notable former employees.

== International presence ==
Countries with Baskin-Robbins locations Current locations Former locations

As of 2025, Baskin-Robbins had more than 7,800 shop locations in Aruba, Australia, Bahrain, Bangladesh, Bhutan, Canada, China, Colombia, Curaçao, Dominican Republic, Ecuador, Estonia, Egypt, Honduras, India, Indonesia, Ireland, Japan, Jordan, Kuwait, Latvia, Lebanon, Malaysia, México, Morocco, Nepal, Oman, Pakistan, Qatar, Saudi Arabia, Singapore, South Korea, Spain, Sri Lanka, Taiwan, Thailand, Tajikistan, United Arab Emirates, United Kingdom, United States, Uzbekistan, Vietnam and Yemen. International locations feature flavors of ice cream popular in each country, such as Red Bean, Litchi Gold, Blackcurrant and Cantaloupe. The most popular flavors of Baskin-Robbins in Asia are Mint Chocolate Chip and Cookies & Cream.

Baskin-Robbins has previously been present in other countries such as Armenia, Azerbaijan, Belarus, Kazakhstan, Malta, Maldives, Mauritius, Mexico, Netherlands, Panama, Philippines, Portugal, Russia, South Africa, and St. Maarten.

Cambodia does not have any locations of Baskin-Robbins but their products are officially available at an Au Bon Pain bakery franchise.

In Japan, China (including the special administrative regions of Hong Kong and Macau), Taiwan, Philippines, Singapore, Indonesia, Vietnam, Myanmar, Thailand, India, Bhutan and Bangladesh, Baskin-Robbins is known popularly as "31" or "31 ice cream".

=== Australia ===
Baskin-Robbins Australia is a wholly owned and operated subsidiary of Inspire Brands, the parent company of Baskin-Robbins and Dunkin'. In October 2010, Dunkin' Brands terminated its license agreement with the collapsed Allied Brands Group for Baskin-Robbins in Australia, and now supports its Australian franchisees directly. The Baskin-Robbins Australia Franchise Support & Training Centre is based in Brisbane.

=== Ireland ===
Baskin Robbins opened in the Republic of Ireland and Northern Ireland in 2015 with a total of eight shops.

== Controversies ==
In 2019, an advertisement promoting a new ice cream flavor in South Korea, "Pink Star," featuring child model Ella Gross, generated controversy, with some internet users describing the ad as "overly sexualized." The company withdrew the ad and apologized to its customers.

In November 2024, Baskin-Robbins introduced a product named "Lucky Vicky Mochi" named after K-pop idol Jang Won-young, but discontinued it following criticism that the company had used the expression without Jang's permission.

== Gallery ==
Countries with current Baskin-Robbins locations
Countries with former Baskin-Robbins locations

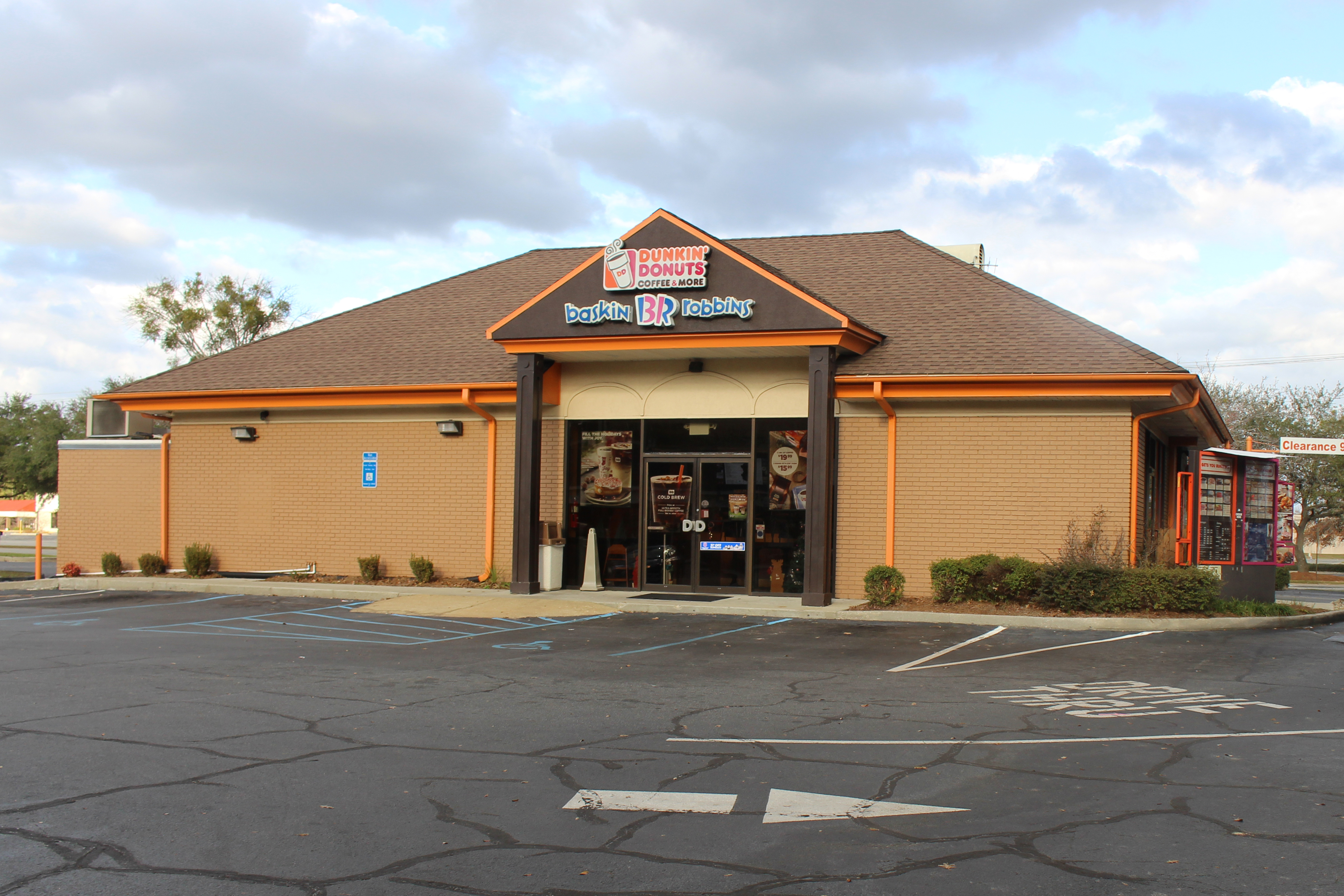
Co-branded Dunkin' Donuts and Baskin-Robbins, Thomasville, Georgia

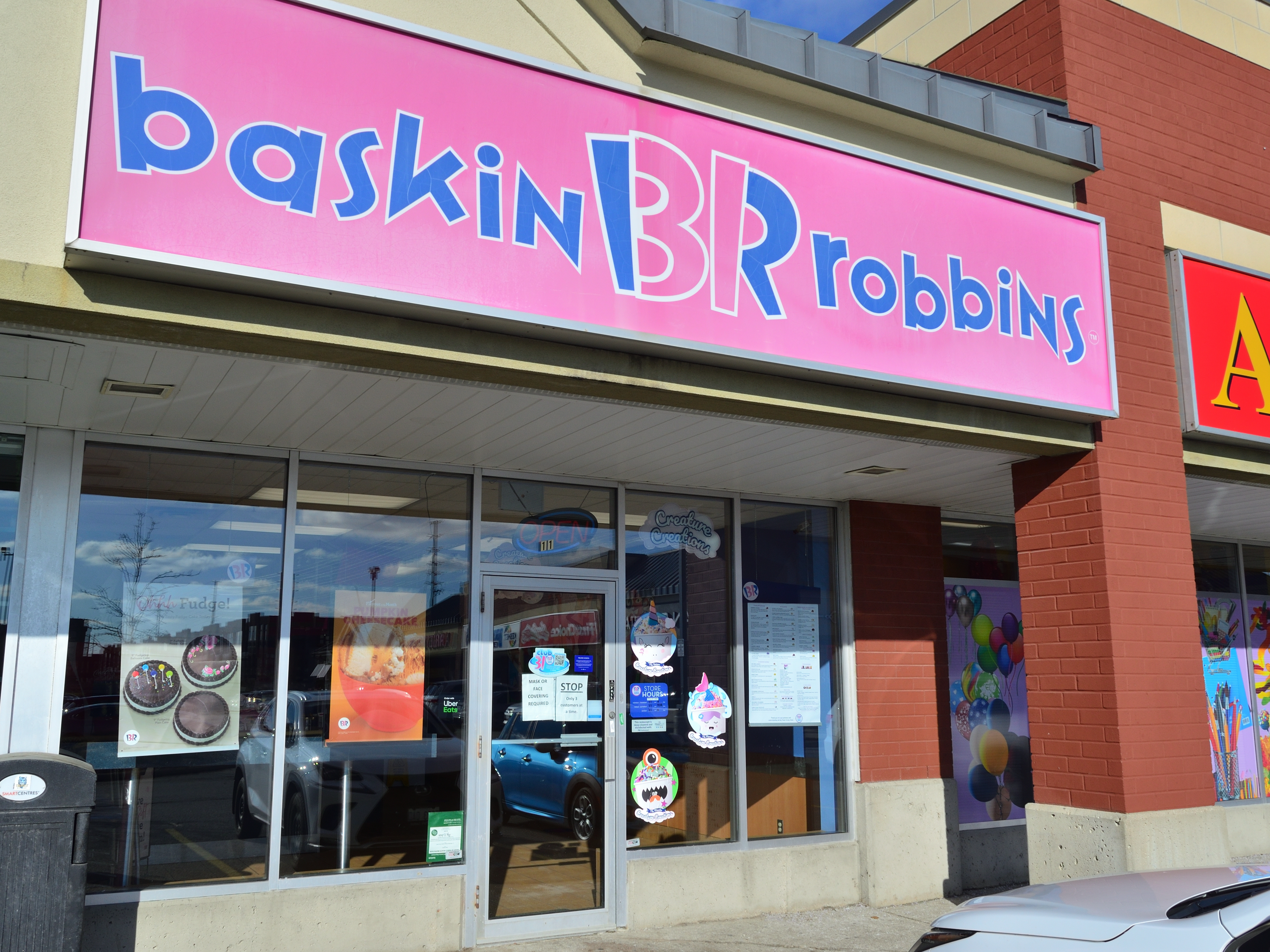
Baskin-Robbins in Thornhill, Ontario

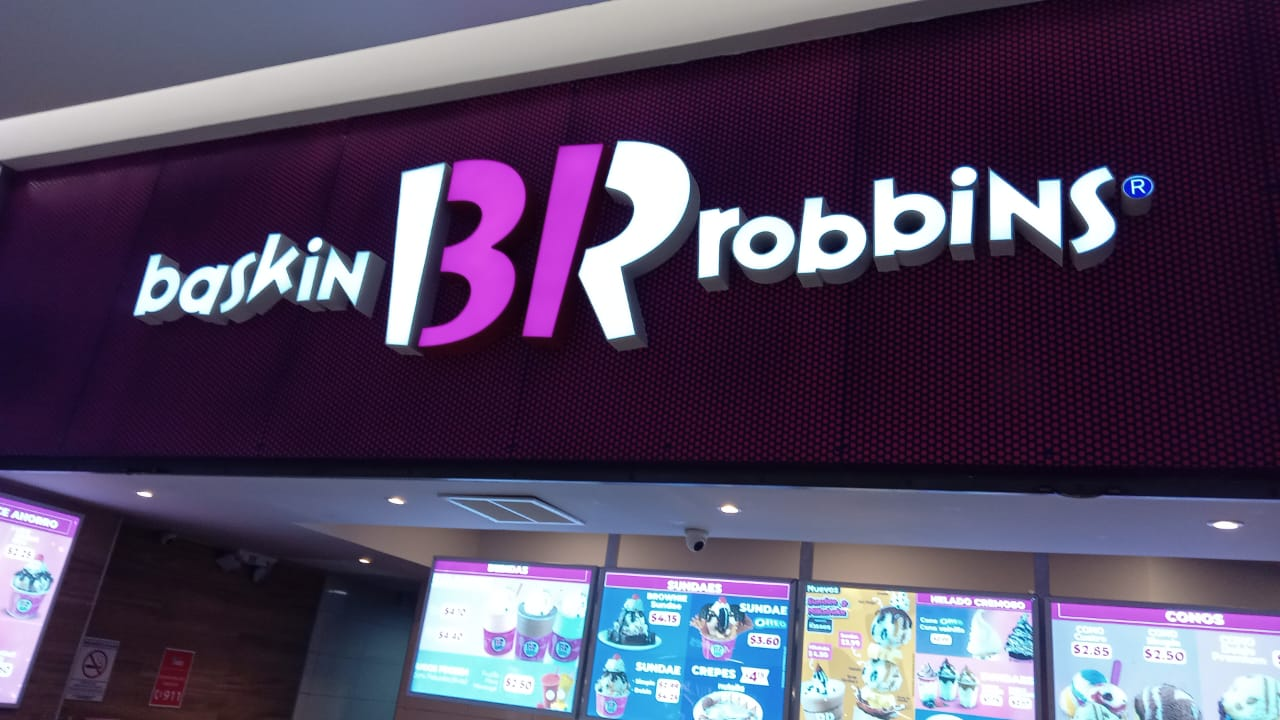
Quito Ecuador in 2022 at a Baskin-Robbins ice cream

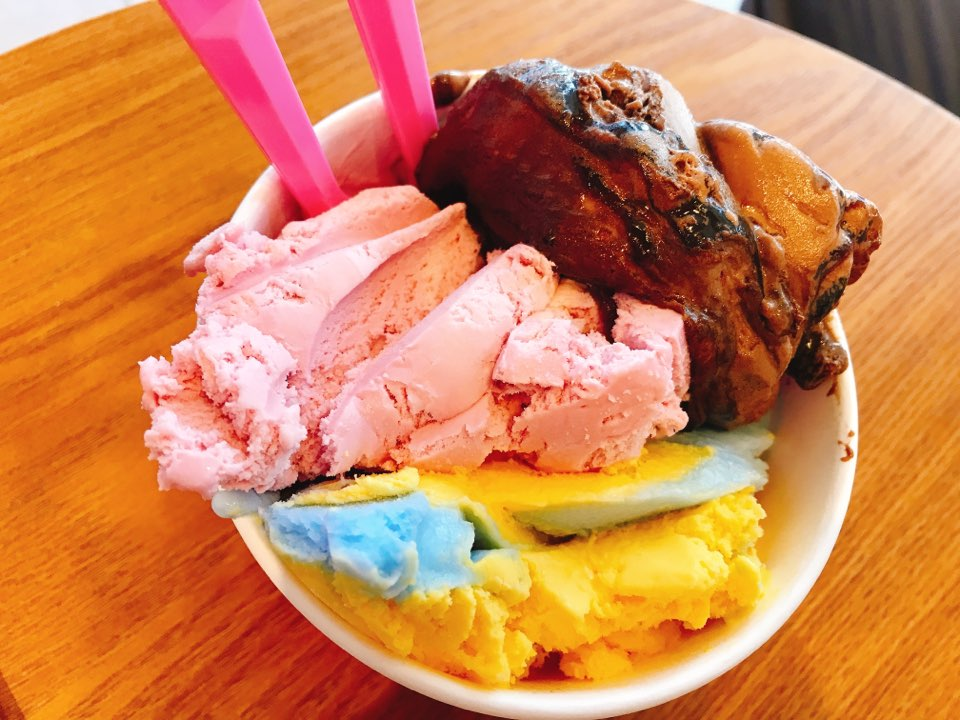
Baskin-Robbins ice cream

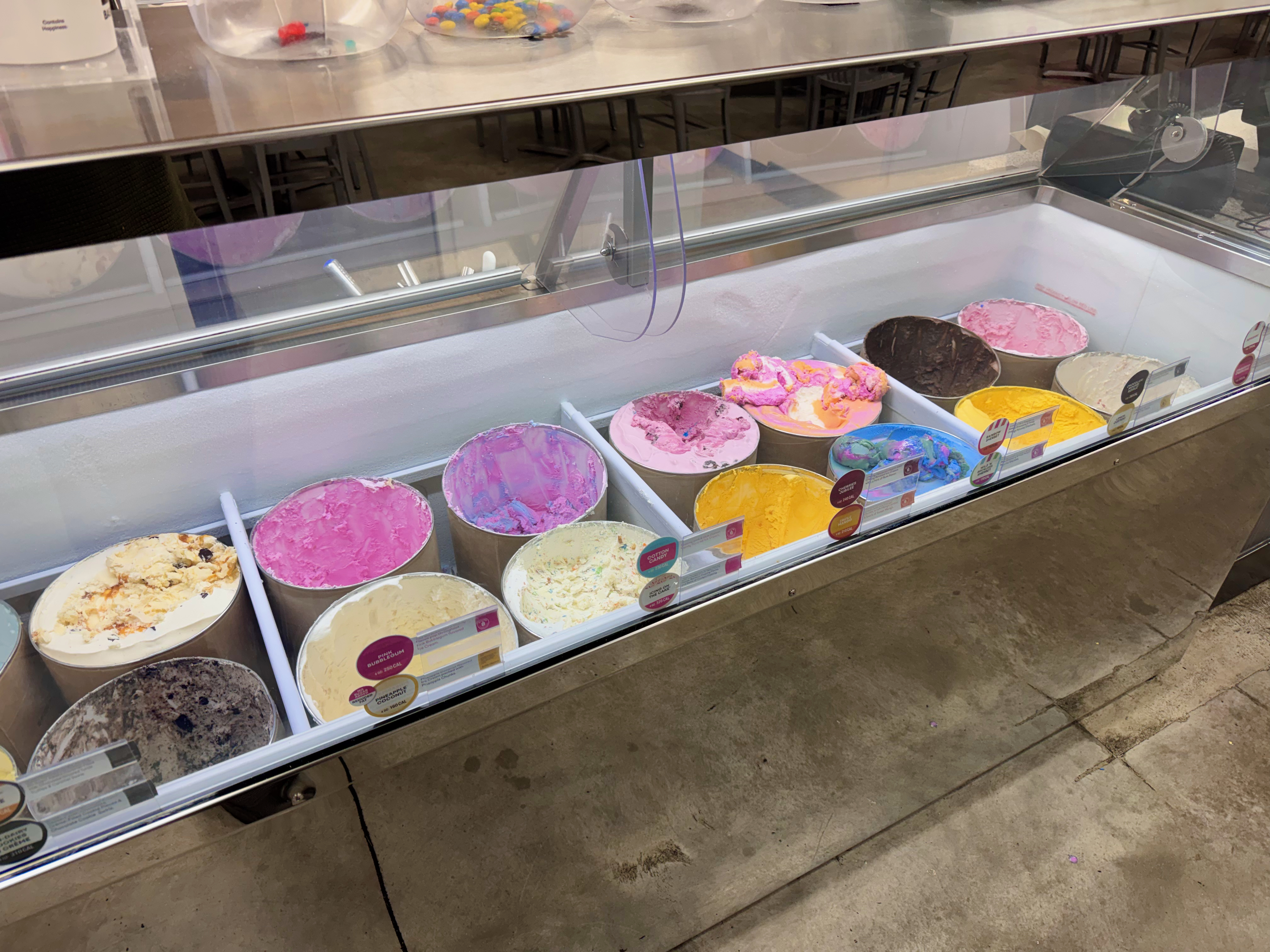
Baskin-Robbins flavors on display in one of the chain's parlors

== See also ==
- List of ice cream parlor chains
