= Rusty Taco =

American fast food chain

- Formerly: R Taco (2015–2018)
- Company type: Private
- Industry: Restaurants
- Genre: Fast casual
- Founded: 2010; 15 years ago Dallas, Texas, United States
- Founders: Rusty Fenton; Denise Fenton
- Headquarters: Atlanta, Georgia, U.S.
- Number of locations: 37 as of December 2021
- Area served: Arizona, Colorado, Georgia, Indiana, Iowa, Kansas, Minnesota, Nebraska, Nevada, New Mexico, Ohio, Texas and Virginia
- Key people: Rusty Fenton (founder); Denise Fenton (Brand Director co-founder) Steve Dunn (Co-founder and partner)
- Products: Tacos, burritos, quesadillas, nachos, taco salads, desserts
- Number of employees: 145 (not including franchises) (2018)
- Parent: Independent (2010–2014); Buffalo Wild Wings (2014–2018); Inspire Brands (2018–2022) Gala Capital Partners (2022-Present)
- Website: rustytaco.com

Rusty Taco is an American-based chain of fast food restaurants originating in Dallas, Texas in 2010, by founders Rusty Fenton and his wife, Denise Fenton. Rusty Taco is a subsidiary of Gala Capital Partners. As of 2022, there are 37 restaurants in nine states.

== History ==
Rusty Taco was founded by Rusty Fenton, his wife Denise and Steve Dunn in 2010. The first location was opened at a former gas station. Rusty Fenton died in 2013 of kidney cancer.

=== Name change ===
The name was shortened to R Taco in 2015, but on September 5, 2018, R Taco announced it was changing its name back to Rusty Taco.

=== Inspire Brands subsidiary ===
In 2014, a majority of shares of Rusty Taco were acquired by Buffalo Wild Wings. Buffalo Wild Wings along with R Taco were acquired by Arby's Restaurant Group in 2018, forming Inspire Brands.

On December 19, 2022, Inspire Brands announced that it had sold Rusty Taco to Gala Capital Partners, owner of Cicis Pizza, Dunn Brothers Coffee, and Mooyah.
