= Inspire Brands =

American restaurant company

Inspire Brands LLC
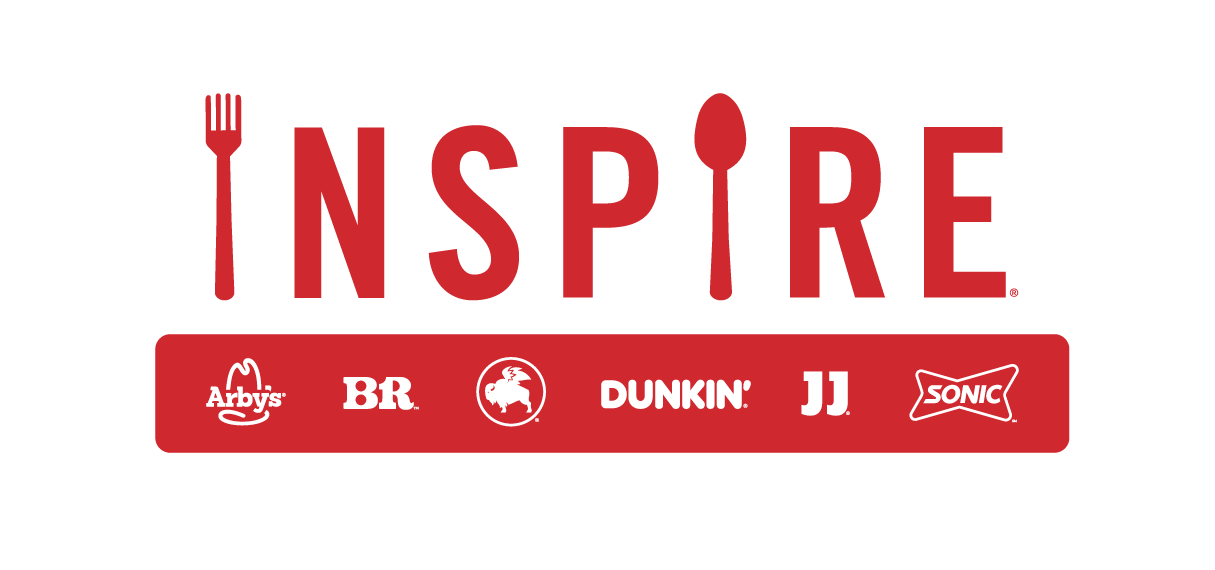
- Type: Private
- Industry: Restaurants
- Founded: February 5, 2018; 8 years ago
- Founders: Neal Aronson and Paul J. Brown
- Headquarters: Sandy Springs, Georgia, United States
- Number of locations: 33,300+ (2026)
- Key people: Paul J. Brown; Kate Jaspon; Scott Murphy; Yasir Anwar; John Kelly
- Revenue: US$33.4 billion (2026)
- Owner: Roark Capital Group
- Number of employees: 650,000+ (2026)
- Subsidiaries: Arby's; Baskin-Robbins; Buffalo Wild Wings; Dunkin'; Jimmy John's; Sonic Drive-In
- Website: inspirebrands.com

Inspire Brands LLC is an American fast-food restaurant franchise holding company. Backed by funds managed by Roark Capital Group, it owns the Arby's, Buffalo Wild Wings, Sonic Drive-In, Jimmy John's, Dunkin', and Baskin-Robbins chains, which have a combined 33,300 locations and US$32.6 billion in system sales. It is one of the largest fast food companies in the world.

== History ==
Inspire Brands was formed when Arby's Restaurant Group merged with Buffalo Wild Wings on February 5, 2018. Buffalo Wild Wings also owned the Rusty Taco chain. Arby's CEO Paul Brown was selected to continue as Inspire Brands CEO. Brown expected that Inspire would acquire additional chains in different segments. He planned to structure the company similar to Hilton Hotels & Resorts. Co-owner The Wendy's Company's stake was reduced from 18.5% to 12.3% due to the infusion of capital from Roark Capital to fund the purchase. In September 2018, Inspire had the 27-location R Taco reverted to the Rusty Taco name.

On August 16, 2018, The Wendy's Company announced that it sold its 12.3% stake in Inspire Brands back to the company for $450 million, which included a 38% premium over the stake's most recent valuation. On August 28, 2018, Georgia Governor Nathan Deal announced that Inspire was moving its headquarters to Sandy Springs, Georgia in 2019.

Inspire Brands on September 25, 2018, announced that it was buying Oklahoma City-based Sonic Drive-In for $2.3 billion. The acquisition was completed on December 7, 2018.

Inspire Brands announced that it was buying Jimmy John's on September 25, 2019. The deal closed on October 18, 2019.

Inspire received Franchise Times’ 2019 Dealmaker of the Year award for its acquisitions of Buffalo Wild Wings and Sonic Drive-In.

Inspire Brands on October 25, 2020, announced that it was buying Dunkin' Brands for $11.3 billion. The acquisition was completed on December 15, 2020.

In March 2021, Inspire Brands sent a review of its government lobbying activities to their franchisees and employees where they highlighted their success in keeping the $15 minimum wage out of Democrats' American Rescue Plan, the COVID-19 relief bill President Joe Biden signed earlier that month.

In August 2021, Inspire Brands announced that it would source only cage-free eggs by 2025.

On December 19, 2022, Inspire Brands announced that it had sold Rusty Taco to Gala Capital Partners, owner of Cicis Pizza, Dunn Brothers Coffee, and Mooyah.

In March 2026, Roark Capital Group considered an initial public offering for Inspire Brands, which could raise about $2 billion as early as 2026.

In May 2026, the company signed a franchise agreement with Montreal-based holding company Foodtastic to bring the Dunkin' restaurant chain back to Canada eight years after the company ceased its operations there. Peter Mammas, the president and CEO of restaurant holding company Foodtastic said its return this time will be different, and that this time the chain’s focus will be on Canadian ownership. Mammas expects the first Dunkin’ cafes to open in Canada by the end of 2026. A year from now, he says the company will likely be able to open a cafe a week, and about 50 cafes a year. “We have boots on the ground, so we’re going to have local support to support the franchisees,” he said. He also said the company will concentrate on opening stories in Quebec and Ontario for the first two years before opening cafes in the Maritimes and the West Coast.

== Brands ==
As of June 2025, the chains that the company owns and/or operates include:

- Arby's
- Baskin-Robbins
- Buffalo Wild Wings
- Dunkin'
- Jimmy John's
- Sonic Drive-In
