= Sonic Drive-In =

American fast food chain

Sonic Corporation
- Logo since 2020

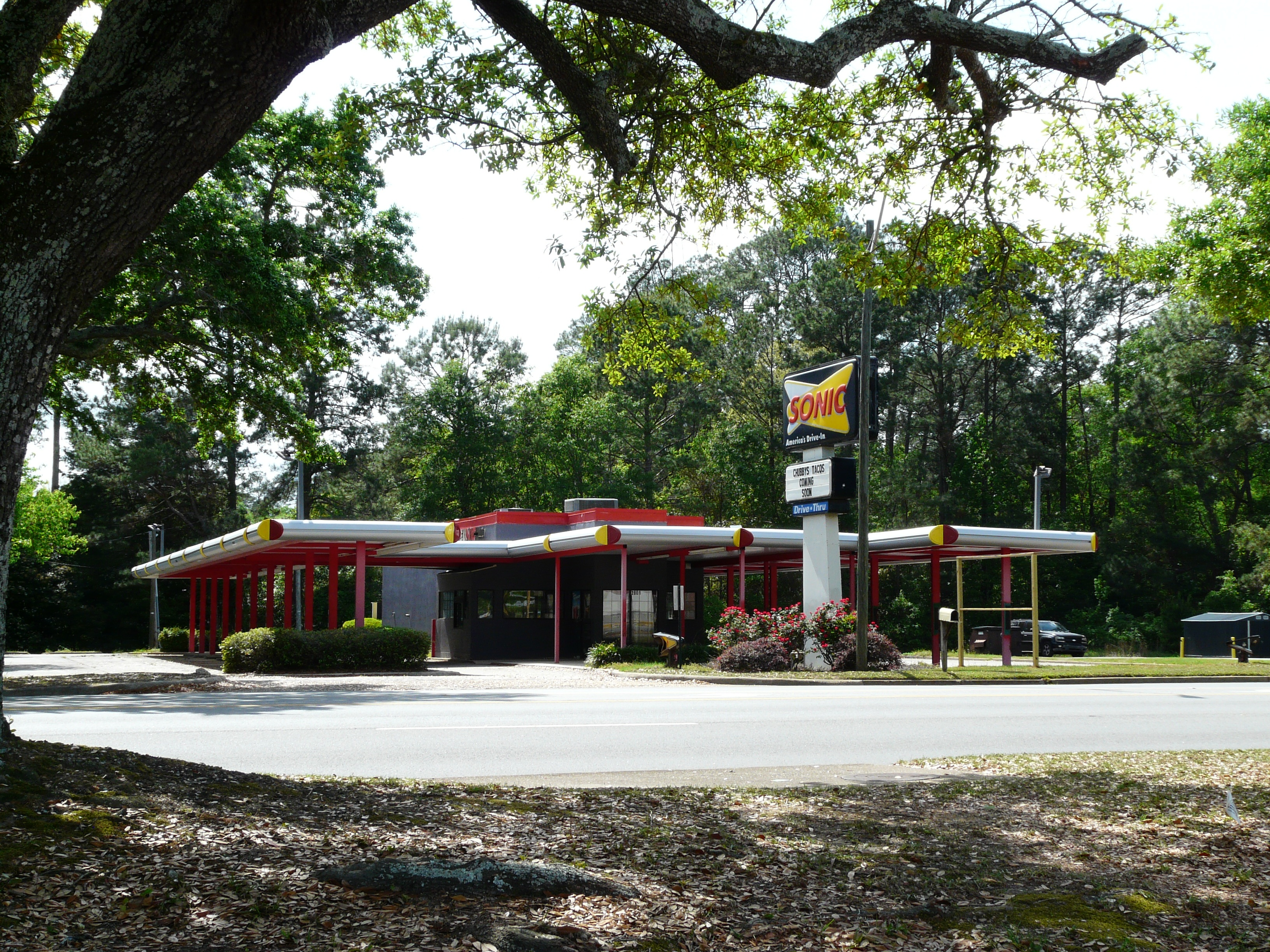
- former location in Thomasville, Georgia
- Type: Subsidiary
- Genre: Fast food
- Founded: June 18, 1953; 73 years ago, in Shawnee, Oklahoma, U.S. (as Top Hat Drive-In)
- Founder: Troy Smith
- Headquarters: Oklahoma City, Oklahoma, United States
- Number of locations: 3,365 locations (2026)
- Area served: United States
- Key people: Paul J. Brown (CEO, Inspire Brands); John Kelly (brand president)
- Products: Hamburgers; Chicken; Sandwiches; Hot dogs; French fries; Soft drinks; Soft serves; Milkshakes; Salads; Coffee; Breakfast; Wraps
- Services: Franchising
- Parent: Inspire Brands (since 2018)
- Website: sonicdrivein.com

Sonic Corporation, founded as Sonic Drive-In and more commonly known as Sonic (stylized in all caps), is an American drive-in fast-food chain owned by Inspire Brands, the parent company of Arby's, Jimmy John's, Buffalo Wild Wings, Baskin-Robbins, and Dunkin'. Sonic, founded by Troy N. Smith Sr., opened its first location in 1953, under the name Top Hat Drive-In. Originally a walk-up root beer stand outside a log-cabin steakhouse selling soda, hamburgers, and hot dogs, Sonic expanded to over 3,400 locations in the United States. Sonic is known for its use of carhops on roller skates at some locations, and hosts an annual competition in most locations to determine the top skating carhop in the company. The company's core products include the "Chili Cheese Coney", "Sonic Cheeseburger Combo", "Sonic Blasts", "Master Shakes", and "Wacky Pack Kids Meals".

== History ==
Following World War II, Sonic founder Troy N. Smith Sr., returned to his hometown of Seminole, Oklahoma, where he became employed as a milkman. He then decided to work delivering bread, because bread is lighter than milk. Soon afterwards, Smith purchased the Cottage Cafe, a little diner in Shawnee, Oklahoma. Before long, he sold it and opened a fast-food service, Troy's Pan Full of Chicken, on the edge of town. In 1953, Smith joined with a business partner to purchase a five-acre parcel of land that had a log house and a walk-up root beer stand named the Top Hat. The two continued operating the root beer stand and converted the log house into a steak restaurant. After realizing that the stand was averaging $700 a week in the sale of root beer, hamburgers, and hot dogs, Smith decided to focus on the more-profitable root beer stand. He bought out his business partner.

Initially, Top Hat customers parked their automobiles anywhere on the gravel parking lot and walked up to place orders. In Louisiana, Smith saw a drive-in that used speakers for ordering. He suspected that he could increase his sales by controlling the parking and having the customers order from speakers at their cars, with carhops delivering the food to the cars. Smith borrowed several automobiles from a friend who owned a used-car lot to establish a layout for controlled parking. He also had some so-called "jukebox boys" wire an intercom system in the parking lot. Sales immediately tripled. Charles Woodrow Pappe, an entrepreneur, was impressed by the Shawnee drive-in. He and Smith negotiated the first franchise location in Woodward, Oklahoma, in 1956, based on a handshake. By 1958, two more drive-ins were built, in Enid and Stillwater.

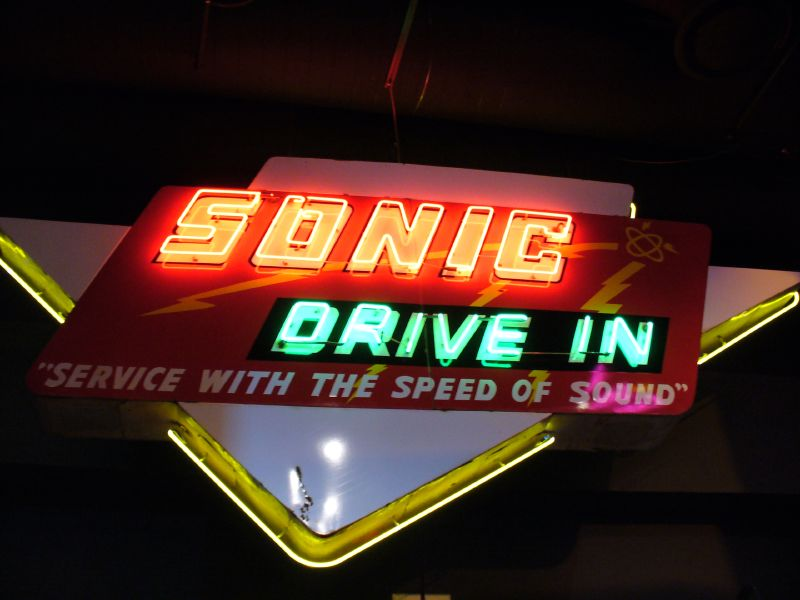
Sonic Drive-In neon sign at the Oklahoma History Center

Upon learning that the Top Hat name was already trademarked, Smith and Pappe changed its name to the Sonic brand in 1959. The new name worked with their existing slogan, "Service with the Speed of Sound". After the name change, the first Sonic sign was installed at the Stillwater Top-Hat Drive-In. This was the first of three Sonics in Stillwater. The original Sonic with the first sign was demolished and renovated in May 2015. Although Smith and Pappe were being asked to help open new franchise locations, no real royalty plan was in place. The pair decided to have their paper company charge an extra penny for each Sonic-label hamburger bag it sold. The proceeds would then be split between Smith and Pappe. The first franchise contracts under this plan were drawn up, but still no joint marketing plan, standardized menu, or detailed operating requirements were in place.

=== 1960s and 1970s ===
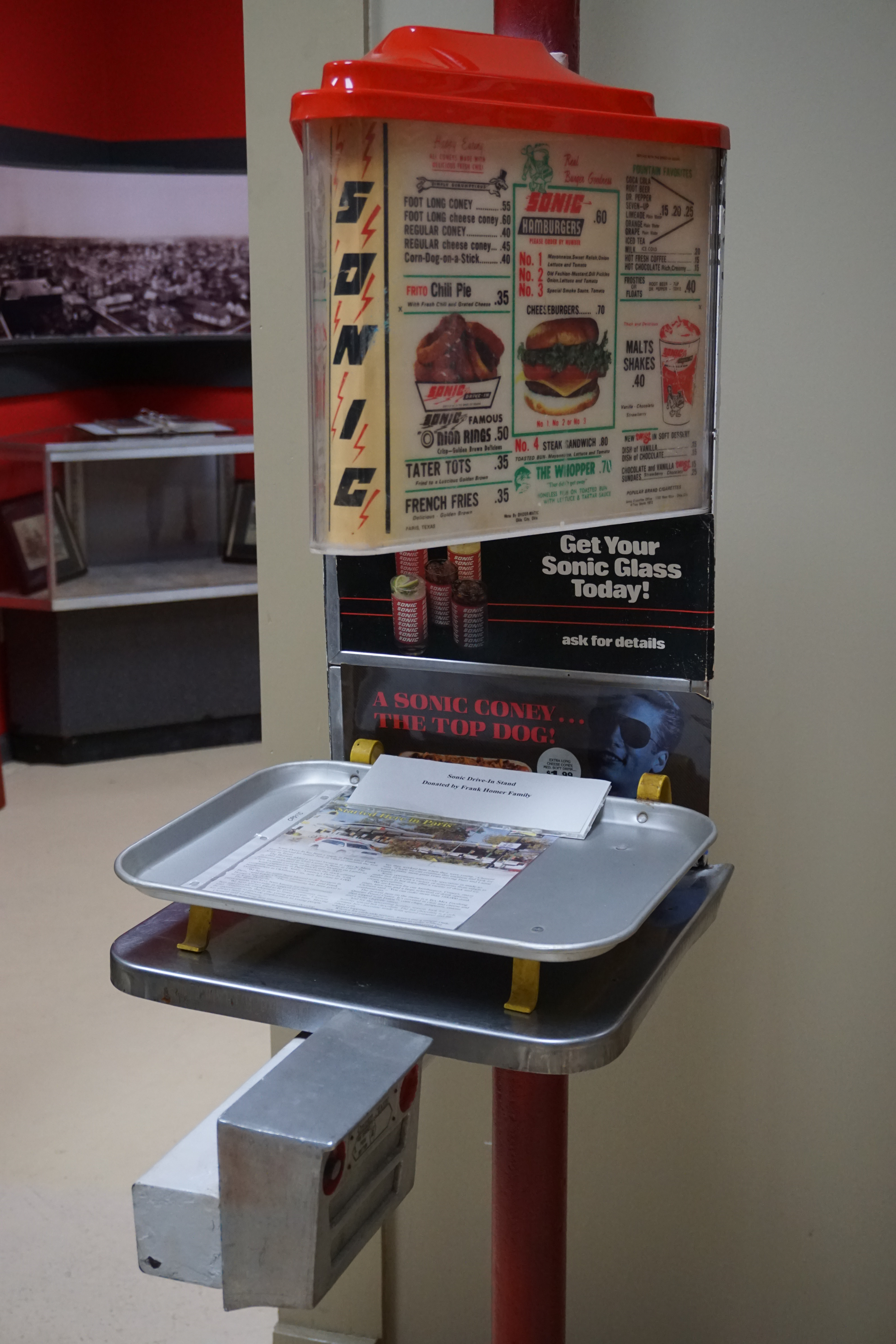
A Sonic Drive-In stand at the Lamar County Historical Museum

Sonic's founders formed Sonic Supply as a supply and distribution division in the 1960s. Under Smith, longtime franchise holders Marvin Jirous and Matt Kinslow were hired to run the division. In 1973, Sonic Supply was restructured as a franchise company that was briefly named Sonic Systems of America. It provided franchisees with equipment, building plans, and basic operational instructions. As the company grew into a regionally known operation during the 1960s and 1970s, the drive-ins were mainly in small towns in Oklahoma, Texas, Kansas, New Mexico, Missouri, and Arkansas. In 1967, the year Pappe died, the brand had 41 drive-ins. By 1972, this number had risen to 165, and by 1978, 1000.

In 1968, Sonic introduced the Pickles-Os, which are fried pickle slices.

In 1977, the company established the Sonic School for manager training. Franchisees operated most of the drive-ins and often made the store manager a business partner, a relationship that persists to this day.

=== 1980s and 1990s ===
In 1983, the company's board of directors hired C. Stephen Lynn as president. In 1984, Lynn hired attorney J. Clifford Hudson to head the legal department. Under Lynn, Sonic and its major franchisees began to encourage the development of local-advertising cooperatives, under the leadership of Keith Sutterfield as advertising manager and later as VP of marketing in which Sutterfield developed a field structure to work with the franchisees. New franchises began to expand the company into new areas and redevelop markets that had been unsuccessful in the past. These developments, combined with a major advertising campaign featuring singer and actor Frankie Avalon, led to significant growth and a new image that made Sonic a nationally recognized name. In 1986, Lynn, with a group of investors, completed a $10-million leveraged buyout and took the company private. The next year, Sonic moved its offices to leased space in downtown Oklahoma City and began to assume a higher profile in the community.

In 1991, Sonic became a publicly traded company again. By 1994, the corporation had renegotiated the franchise agreements with its franchisees.

During the mid-1990s, Sonic opened 100–150 new stores a year. Beginning in 1998, Sonic began a retrofit program, called "Sonic 2000", to redesign and update all 1,750 stores in its chain to what was called a "retro-future" look.

=== 2000s ===
Hudson was named chairman of Sonic Corp. in January 2000.

In September of 2002, Sonic Corporation introduced PartnerNet to its franchisees, an intranet array of services that for the first time, digitally linked all Sonic Drive-in locations to Sonic Corporation. The new intranet was via Hughes Satellite Services and provided advancements like credit card processing and video training. The compulsory service package was headlined with the introduction of Sonic Live Radio by StudioStream Signature Sound, featuring a toll-free request line, 866-SONIC-FM, and live on-air personalities. The live radio style was first of its kind for corporate America, later emulated by the likes of Walmart. Sonic Live Radio, in beta since 2001, was released to all locations in February 2003.

Sonic gained further attention in 2003 following the release of comedic reality show The Simple Life starring Paris Hilton and Nicole Richie. Hilton and Richie, previously with no experience in having a job, had to work in a Sonic site in Altus, Arkansas.

Celebrating its 50th birthday in 2003, Sonic briefly added the Birthday Cake Shake to the menu. As a part of the anniversary celebration, Pickle-O's made another appearance as a recurring item. Development milestones celebrated in the 2000s include the opening of the 3,000th Sonic Drive-In in Shawnee, Oklahoma, and the 3,500th Sonic Drive-In in the Chicago market (Algonquin, Illinois). In October 2004, President Pattye Moore stepped down to spend more time with her family. On June 28, 2005, helped by new menu items and increased advertising exposure, Sonic Corp. reported double-digit increases in net income and revenue in the third quarter that year. On January 5, 2005, the company started to install card readers in the drive-in stalls at its 544 company-owned locations by the end of January that year. In 2007, the company opened its first stores in the Northeastern United States, in Waretown, New Jersey.

In 2009, Sonic partnered with DonorsChoose.org on a collaborative effort, Limeades for Learning, the chain's first systemwide cause marketing initiative. Public school teachers request needed supplies and materials and Sonic customers vote on how to allocate over $500,000 each autumn. In the first seven years of the program, Sonic and its franchisees donated more than $6 million and impacted learning for more than 349,000 students nationwide.

In September 2009, Omar Janjua joined the company as president of its restaurant operating subsidiary, Sonic Restaurants, Inc. and left in 2015.

Despite growth into new markets outside their traditional footprint, the company was hit hard by the recession of 2008–2009. In 2009, the brand had multiple quarters of declines in same-store sales. Plans to bring Sonic to Alaska had not yet come to fruition. On October 26, 2015, Sonic opened its first Rhode Island location in Smithfield, reporting to have received 500 orders on its opening day. In the mid-2010s, the company began a refranchising effort and began to add to its numbers of stores again.

=== 2010s ===
In January 2010, Sonic announced that they would begin switching to battery cage-free eggs, gestation crate-free pork, and chickens killed using controlled-atmosphere stunning methods instead of traditional shackling and electrical stunning. The company has subsequently backtracked on these commitments and now faces public criticism.

Sonic reformulated its soft-serve ice cream to meet the FDA standards of identity that define what constitutes real ice cream and introduced Real Ice Cream on May 17, 2010. Several new hot dog items were also introduced in June 2010 and February 2011.

Craig Miller was hired as chief information officer in January 2012. In June 2010, Danielle Vona was hired as chief marketing officer.

In late 2010, Sonic announced the end of its 17-year relationship with advertising agency Barkley. A group of specialized agencies was selected to represent the company, and in early 2011, San Francisco-based Goodby Silverstein and Partners was named as the new creative agency for the company. In 2017, Sonic announced it would add seven new stores in Hawaii in the near future. However, its first location in the state would not open unilt May 2026 with a single location in Kapolei. In September 2019, Sonic opened its first location in Alaska in Wasilla, and a year later it opened its second Alaska location in Fairbanks.

On September 25, 2018, Atlanta-based Inspire Brands, owner of Arby's and Buffalo Wild Wings, announced that it would acquire Sonic for $2.3 billion. The acquisition was completed on December 7, 2018.

While he was with the St. Louis Cardinals, major league outfielder Harrison Bader partnered with Sonic Drive-In to sell "Bader Tots" at participating St. Louis area locations; in 2018 a young fan had given Bader a tater tot, and during the Players Weekend his baseball jersey read “TOTS.”

=== 2020s ===
In 2020, Sonic unveiled a new drive-in design with an updated, wider layout for car docks and the drive-thru lane, a new kitchen layout built for efficiency, and an aesthetic makeover.

By March 2020, all locations indefinitely suspended patio dining due to COVID-19, but continued to serve take-away and pickup customers.

== Company profile ==
A rebranded Sonic location in Lancaster, Pennsylvania

Although Sonic has operated since the early 1950s, Sonic Corp. incorporated in Delaware in 1990. It has its corporate headquarters in Oklahoma City; the headquarters building features a dine-in Sonic restaurant in an adjacent building. Prior to its acquisition by Inspire Brands, its stock traded on NASDAQ with the symbol SONC. Most restaurants are owned and operated by franchisees. Total system sales as disclosed in 2026 were $5.2 billion.

== Employee relations and opportunities ==
In February 2019, employees of three Ohio locations resigned en masse due to management changes, as well as what they alleged was a 50% reduction of the employee hourly pay rate, a claim denied by Sonic.

In 2020, Sonic added a tipping feature via the online ordering app. In 2021, Sonic added an option to tip at the stalls.

== Sonic Beach ==
Sonic Beach logo

In June 2011, the first location under the name Sonic Beach was opened in Homestead, Florida. A second location, opened in Fort Lauderdale, Florida, in November 2011, lacked drive-in stalls due to its beachside location. Both locations included outdoor seating and flatscreen televisions, but have since closed. A third location was opened in Miami Gardens. The fourth location was opened January 2014 in Lauderhill.

Along with the traditional menu items, Sonic Beach offered several new items, including popcorn shrimp, Philly cheesesteaks, and pulled pork sandwiches. Sonic Beach serves beer and wine. Remaining locations have been rebranded under the traditional Sonic name, although retaining the Sonic Beach logo.

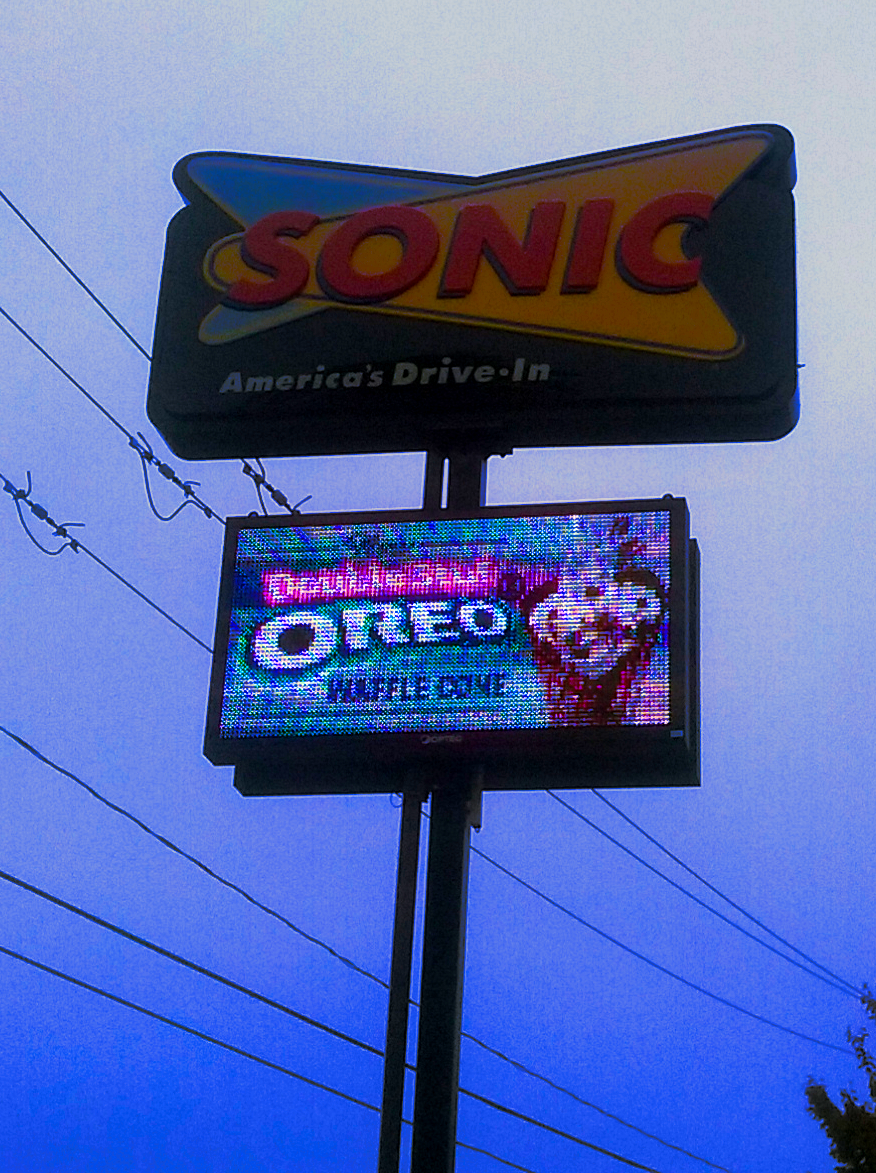
Roadside sign at Latham, NY location

== Advertising ==
Sonic ran its first television advertisement in 1977. One of the company's most memorable advertising campaigns, which ran from 1987 to 1993, featured Frankie Avalon. In May 1999, the company began a new campaign featuring the character Katie the Carhop.

Sonic was also involved with NASCAR. The company contracted with Richard Childress Racing in late 2000 to be an associate sponsor for Dale Earnhardt Sr. during the 2001 NASCAR Winston Cup Series season. After Earnhardt died in an accident at the 2001 Daytona 500, the company continued its sponsorship with his replacement driver Kevin Harvick, through the end of the 2003 season. Sonic returned to NASCAR several years later to sponsor Sam Hornish Jr. and Richard Petty Motorsports in 2015.

In 2004, the company became more widely known nationally by advertising in television markets hundreds of miles from its nearest franchise. Improvisational actors T. J. Jagodowski and Peter Grosz became known to American television viewers from their "Two Guys" series of commercials. Similar series of ads for the company have featured other duos of improvisational performers, including Molly Erdman and Brian Huskey, Katie Rich and Sayjal Joshi, and Emily Wilson and Tim Baltz. In 2010, national auditions were held and a new series of commercials began airing, some of which featured carhops from Wisconsin and Austin, Texas. In 2012 the "Two Guys" returned to the company's television ads. In 2018 Sonic supplemented their "Two Guys" commercials with complementary "Two Gals" commercials. The "Two Gals" are played by Ellie Kemper and Jane Krakowski. In 2020, Sonic shifted their "Two Guys" campaign to a new campaign known as "Everyday People" with the same formula but with families instead of guys.

Slogans used by Sonic over the years include:

- "Service With the Speed of Sound" (1958)
- "Happy Eating" (1980s: on signs at many of the company's drive-ins)
- "America's Drive-In" (1987)
- "Faster and Better than Ever" (1988–1990)
- "No Place Hops like Sonic" (1990–1993)
- "Summer's Funner" (1993)
- "Drive-In for a Change" (1995–1997)
- "All Summer Long" (1997)
- "It's Sonic Good" (2003-2011)
- "Sonic's Got It, Others Don't" (2007)
- "Even Sweeter After Dark" (2009)
- "This is How You Sonic" (2011–2020)
- "Sonic Everywhere" (2016)
- "You Guys Wanna Hang Out Sometime" (2016)
- “This Is How We Sonic” (2020)
- "Mmm. Sonic." (2022)
- “Live Free, Eat Sonic” (2024)

== See also ==
- List of hamburger restaurants
