= Paul J. Brown =

American businessman

Paul Brown
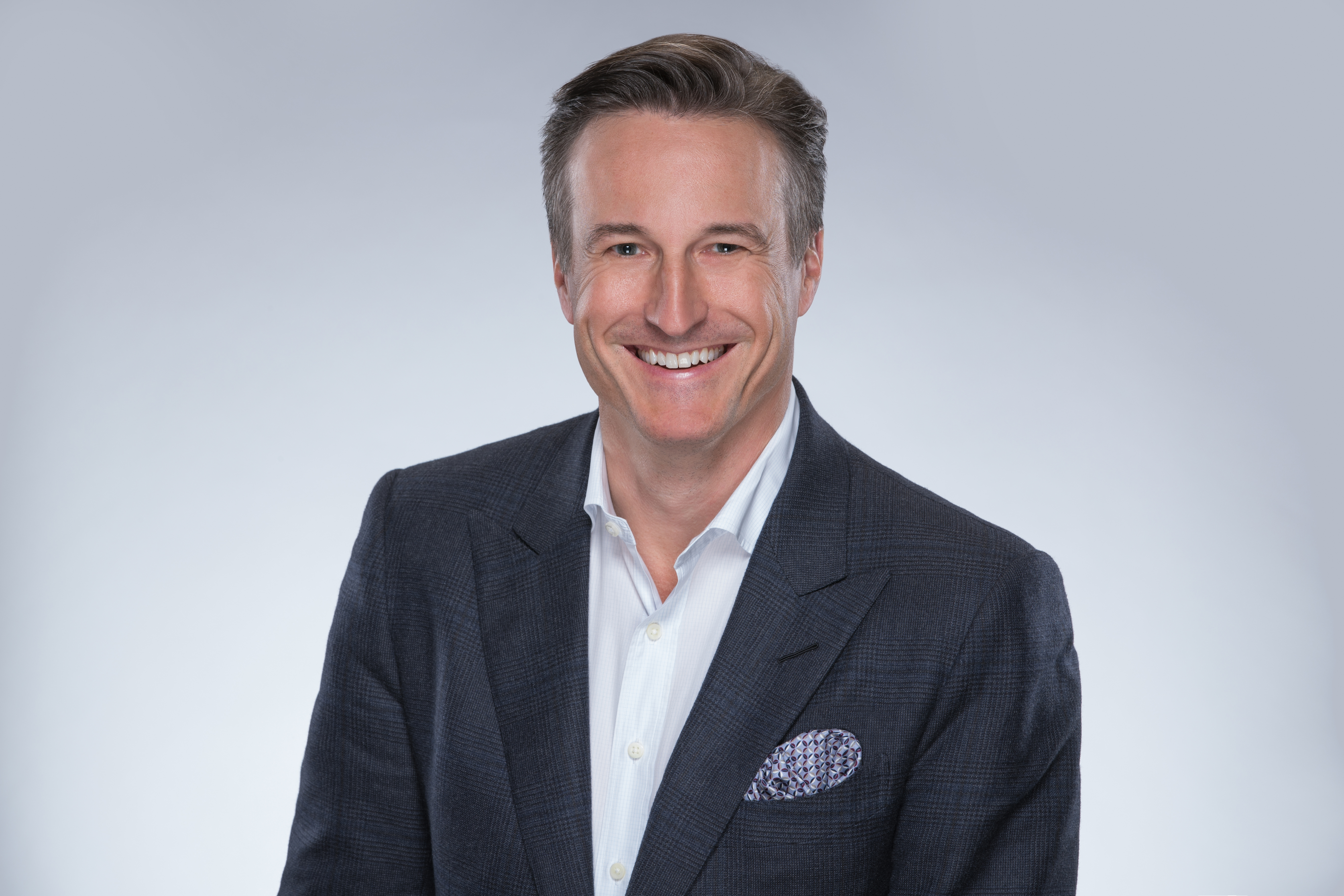
- Education: Georgia Institute of Technology (BS); Northwestern University (MS, MBA)
- Occupations: Co-Founder and CEO of Inspire Brands

Paul J. Brown is an American businessman and the co-founder and chief executive officer of Inspire Brands. He is the former chief executive officer of Arby's.

== Education ==
Brown is an alumnus of Georgia Tech where he received a Bachelor of Science degree in management. He also received an MBA from Northwestern University’s Kellogg School of Management and a Master of Engineering Management from the Robert R. McCormick School of Engineering and Applied Science.

== Career ==
=== Early career ===
Brown was previously the President of Brands and Commercial Services of Hilton Worldwide, President of Expedia North America and Senior Vice President of Global Brand Services at InterContinental Hotels Group. He also held positions with The Boston Consulting Group and McKinsey & Company.

=== Arby’s (2013–2018) ===
In May 2013, Brown became Chief Executive Officer of Arby’s. During his tenure as CEO of Arby’s, the brand introduced a new restaurant design and launched the “We Have The Meats” marketing campaign. Brown also introduced new menu items including smokehouse brisket, pork belly, gyros, deep-fried turkey, and venison. Brown led Arby’s international development agreements to expand in to Kuwait, Saudi Arabia, and Egypt.

In 2017, under Brown’s leadership, Fortune named Arby’s to its 100 Best Workplaces list for Millennials, Women, and Diversity. Restaurant Business credited Brown for the turnaround of the Arby’s business.

=== Inspire Brands (2018–present) ===
In February 2018, Brown and Neal Aronson of Roark Capital Group founded Inspire Brands when Arby’s completed its acquisition of Buffalo Wild Wings for $2.9 billion.

In December 2018, under Brown’s leadership, Inspire completed its acquisition of SONIC Drive-In for $2.3 billion.

In October 2019, Inspire completed its acquisition of sandwich chain Jimmy John’s.

Inspire Brands on October 25, 2020, announced that it was buying Dunkin' Brands for $11.3 billion.

The acquisition was completed on December 15, 2020.

== Boards and awards ==
Brown was named by Business Insider in 2019 as one of the 100 People Transforming Business. He was also named a 2018 Norman Award recipient by Nation’s Restaurant News, a 2018 Silver Plate honoree by IFMA, the 2017 Restaurant Leader of the Year by Restaurant Business, and a 2016 Entrepreneur of the Year in Retail and Consumer Products in the Southeast by EY.

Brown is chairman of the board of directors of Children’s Healthcare of Atlanta. He also serves on the boards of the Georgia Tech Foundation, the Metro Atlanta Chamber of Commerce Executive Committee and several other community organizations.
