= Disappearance of Kevin Nguyen =

Kevin Nguyen disappeared from a bar in Fort Wayne, Indiana, in the early morning hours of December 8, 2018, following an alleged altercation that resulted in him being removed from the establishment. He called his sister to pick him up. Their mother went instead and his sister went to bed. When she awoke, she was informed that Kevin was not found at the bar. She stated she received another call from him, but she slept through it and did not answer. Kevin was last seen on security camera footage at a nearby Arby's restaurant, which has not been released to the public or the family. He was reported missing on December 10. He was 25 years old at the time of his disappearance. His glasses were found smashed in the bar's parking lot by his family. His family held a vigil one year after his disappearance.
