= G.D. Ritzy's =

American fast food and ice cream franchise

- Industry: Restaurants
- Genre: Quick service
- Founded: May 22, 1980 (46 years ago) in Columbus, Ohio
- Founder: Graydon D. Webb
- Headquarters: Columbus, Ohio
- Number of locations: 6
- Area served: United States
- Products: Hamburgers • french fries • ice cream • hot dogs • Cincinnati chili
- Subsidiaries: Daddy-O's Express (1988-1990)

G.D. Ritzy's (also known as G. D. Ritzy's Luxury Grill & Ice Creams or simply Ritzy's) is an art deco themed American fast food chain. Founded in 1980, the chain grew to more than 100 locations at its peak. Due to issues caused by rapid expansion, the parent company folded in 1991. As of 2023, six locations operate across Indiana, Kentucky, and Ohio.

Locations are decorated to resemble 1940's diners, serving smash burgers, coneys, house-made ice cream, and the self-proclaimed "world's best" peanut butter and jelly sandwich.

== History ==
Graydon Webb was originally one of the first Wendy's executives. Joining as an employee at the first location, he would see the company grow to over 2,000 locations. In June 1979, he stepped down as vice president of franchising to establish his own company: G.D. Ritzy's Inc., the "G.D." coming from his own initials.

The first G.D. Ritzy's location would open in May 1980 in Columbus, Ohio. By 1982, the chain would have 7 stores and begin franchising. The restaurants ice cream would be voted the best in Columbus by The Columbus Dispatch, and rank highly in a national taste test. Branded pints of ice cream would begin to be sold in local grocery stores. The company would go public in December.

Despite growing to 100 locations by the end of 1984, the chain still struggled to turn a profit. Priorities would shift towards building stronger management in stores, closing underperforming locations, and moving to a smaller corporate office. By 1985, the chain would begin rebranding to just "Ritzy's" due to complaints of blasphemy under the belief that the "G. D." initials stood for "God Damn". Webb would step down as president and CEO on January 1, 1987.

In 1988, Ritzy's would create "Daddy-O's Express", a smaller double drive-through concept meant to compete with chains like Rally's. The 5-unit chain would be sold to Arby's in 1990.

That September, a majority stake in the company would be sold to Johnson Industries out of Urbana, Ohio. Despite a few profitable quarters in 1987 and 1988, things would quickly take a turn for the worse. In July 1990, Ritzy's stock would be delisted by NASDAQ. In December 1990, an unnamed group of investors would acquire Johnson Industries stake. Aside from converting a few underperforming locations to a budget concept called "Cheapers", little changed. G.D. Ritzy's Inc. would cease operations in October 1991, closing all corporate-owned stores. Several franchised locations would follow suit.

A group of the remaining franchisees would form "G.D.R. Franchisee Association Inc.", which handled the franchising rights and oversaw the remaining 17 locations. While they initially hoped to reopen closed stores, the number of operating locations would continue to dwindle through the 90's.

In December 2002, the Ritzy's brand would be acquired by real estate developer Haydn Cutler. Working with Webb, he would form "Ritzy's International Ltd.", with plans to build three test locations in the Dallas-Fort Worth area before a full national relaunch. The first would open near Grapevine Mills in late 2004; the second in Frisco would be delayed until 2006. A third location planned for Lewisville never materialized. These locations differed from the existing chain, featuring a more contemporary design and menu, including items like 1/3 pound Black Angus hamburgers and custom-made-to-order salad. The Frisco location would close in 2008, with the Grapevine location closing in 2013.

=== Surviving locations ===
Today, six locations remain in Evansville, Indiana, Owensboro, Kentucky, and Columbus, Ohio. These locations are run by 3 separate operators, who each have slightly different offerings and branding.

The three Evansville locations still use the original G.D. Ritzy's name and green color scheme.

The first Owensboro location opened in 1996 as the last new franchisee, using the "Ritzy's" branding and red color scheme. A second location would open on the east side of the city in 2006.

In 2018, Graydon Webb, along with his sons and business partners, would open a new Ritzy's location in Columbus on High Street. The restaurant was built on the site of an abandoned car lot (Originally built as an A&W), and features no drive-through service.

A sole location in Huntington, West Virginia also survived into the 21st century, but would close in 2023.

== Menu ==
The menu of G.D. Ritzy's is based on what you'd expect to find at a local diner or soda shop. Standard food items include hot dogs, coney dogs, Cincinnati-style chili served up to a 7-way, and hamburgers pressed on the grill and served on a toasted bun. One of their specialties is the peanut butter and jelly sandwich, which is served with the addition of crushed peanuts and sliced strawberries. Another specialty is the Big Bopper, a fried bologna sandwich; however, this is not currently sold at any location.

Locations also feature a full ice cream station, with most stores making their ice cream in-house. The chain would often promote how it's ice cream is dense and high in butterfat, compared to airy soft serve sold by most places. The chain also serves milkshakes, malts, and floats.

== Design ==
G.D. Ritzy's locations are based on the Art Deco aesthetic, more specifically, 1940s diners, although this later leaned more toward the 1950s. The most signature element of their buildings is having the front right corner rounded off, a feature still prevalent on many former locations.

The interiors feature the dining room on a raised platform above the counter and kitchen. The interior features hexagonal tile floors, marble tabletops, thin steel railings, and replica Seeburg speakers that play various big band and swing recordings.
