= Dunn Brothers Coffee =

Coffee shop chain based in Minnesota, United States

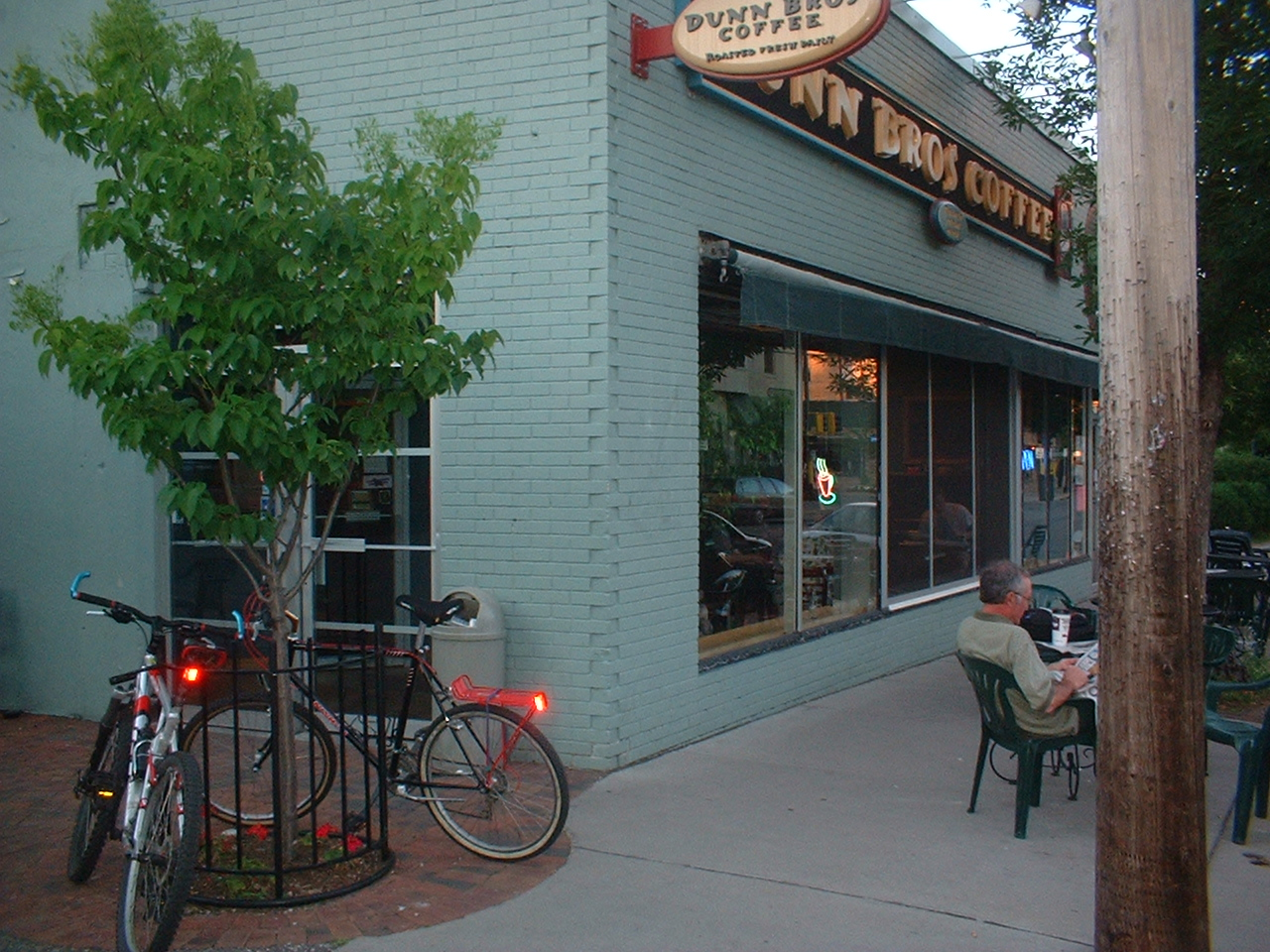
- Dunn Brothers Coffee in Minneapolis, Minnesota
- Industry: Food and beverage; Coffeehouse; Franchising
- Founded: 1987; 39 years ago in St. Paul, Minnesota, U.S.
- Founder: Ed Dunn; Dan Dunn
- Number of locations: 46 (2026)
- Products: Baked goods; Frozen beverages; Hot beverages; Iced beverages
- Owner: Gala Capital Partners
- Website: dunnbrothers.com

Dunn Brothers Coffee is a franchise company of coffeehouses founded in St. Paul, Minnesota, in December 1987 by brothers Ed and Dan Dunn. As of May 2026, Dunn Brothers Coffee has 46 locations in Iowa, Minnesota, Missouri, North Dakota, South Dakota, and Wisconsin.

== History ==
The first store opened in 1987 at 1569 Grand Avenue in St. Paul, after the Dunn brothers had driven an old Dodge van loaded with their belongings from Portland, Oregon, to Minnesota in search of a good, underserved location for a coffee business.

They found a refurbished 1950s Probat roaster in Cincinnati, Ohio, and used it to set up that first store. The second location opened in Uptown Minneapolis in 1991 (and was temporarily the only location while the Grand Avenue store was rebuilt following a 1991 fire). The Grand Avenue store still exists as "Dunn Bros Coffee" but is not part of the Dunn Brothers Coffee franchise.

On July 25, 2022, Dunn Brothers Coffee announced that it was acquired by Gala Capital Partners, owner of Cicis Pizza and Mooyah.

On July 10, 2023, Dunn Brothers Coffee (DBC) appointed Scott Harvey as its new president. Having previously held roles at Golden Krust Caribbean Bakery, Einstein Bros. Bagels, and Black Rifle Coffee, Harvey brought a depth of knowledge in the restaurant and franchise space.

In his role as president for Dunn Brothers, Harvey took the helm of the brand's franchise development strategy, expanding its footprint in its existing Midwest and Great Plains markets, and beyond. With a new lens on franchising under Harvey's leadership, the brand also implemented its latest store prototype that included a smaller footprint and a focus on drive-thru operations.

In June 2025, DBC named Benjamin Anderson as its new President. He brings more than 25 years of food and beverage industry experience to Dunn Brothers Coffee, with leadership in coffee and restaurant operations.

Anderson previously served as vice president of operations at Pentex Restaurant Group, overseeing significant expansion and multi-state operations, and held key positions at Caribou Coffee where he directed operations and launched its cabin drive-thru concept, as well as managing Jamba Juice locations.

== Franchise ==
The store's locations are primarily in the American Midwest, especially Minnesota, where there are more than 20 locations. As of 2025, the company has stores in Iowa, Minnesota, Missouri, North Dakota, South Dakota, and Wisconsin. Dunn Bros Coffee is a franchise, and most stores are locally owned and operated. One distinguishing feature that separates Dunn Bros from most of its chain competitors is that at every traditional location the coffee is roasted right in the store, usually on a daily basis. This allows customers to buy freshly roasted whole beans. The in-store roasting and small batch sizes typically allow for the availability of 12-15 varieties of whole beans.

Dunn Bros partners with sustainable coffee certification bodies around the world including Fair Trade USA, and Rainforest Alliance.

== See also ==
- List of coffeehouse chains
