= Troy Smith (businessman) =

American businessman (1922–2009)

Troy Nuel Smith Sr. (May 26, 1922 – October 26, 2009) was an American businessman who founded Sonic Drive-In, a fast-food restaurant chain based in Oklahoma City that recreates the drive-in diner feel of the 1950s, complete with carhops who usually wear roller skates. By the time of Smith's death in 2009, the chain had 3,600 restaurants in 42 U.S. states.

== Background ==
Smith was born on May 26, 1922, in Oilton, Creek County, Oklahoma, to Leslie and Myrtle Smith. His father was an oil field worker and moved his family to Econtucka, Seminole County, where he worked the Deep Rock Oil Co. Troy graduated Seminole High School in 1940, married Dollie Twiggs March 18, 1941, and in December 1942 enlisted in the United States Army Air Forces during World War II.

== Founding of Sonic ==
After completing his military service, he worked as a milk truck driver. Choosing to be his own boss, Smith opened a cafe in Shawnee, Oklahoma, and another chicken restaurant.

He partnered with Joe McKimmey and the two owned the Top Hat hamburger drive-in and the Log House steak restaurant, a restaurant in the rear. While driving near the Texas–Louisiana border, he pulled into a fast food restaurant that used a series of intercoms at each parking spot to allow customers to place orders directly from their cars. Smith obtained the design of the communication system and upon returning to Shawnee he sold his interest in the Top Hat and Log House to McKimmey in 1959. He moved about a mile south on Harrison Street and built a new drive-up which allowed customers to place orders and have them delivered to their car within three minutes by carhops on roller skates.

In Smith's version of the drive-in, parking was angled to afford greater privacy, and the speakers would play popular music for patrons while dining. He also put his design in a drive-in in Stillwater and renamed the restaurants as Sonic, with the slogan "Service with the Speed of Sound". In an effort to expand the number of locations and bring in new talent, Sonic pursued a franchise-based model which had a new location opening daily, on average, in the late 1970s, though an economic turndown saw the closure of 300 of the chain's 1,300 restaurants in the early 1980s.

He stepped down from operating the firm in 1983 but retained a seat on the company's board. By the time of his death, the chain operated in 42 states at some 3,600 locations.

In January 2007 Smith and his wife donated Sonic stock valued at $3 million to the University of Central Oklahoma, the largest unrestricted cash gift in UCO's history. The couple also donated funds for the new YMCA complex in Shawnee and it bears their name, Troy and Dollie Smith.

== Death ==
Smith died at age 87 on October 26, 2009, in Oklahoma City after two decades of Alzheimer's disease. He was survived by his wife Dollie, as well as by a daughter, a son, eight grandchildren, and nine great-grandchildren.
