= Dunkin' Brands =

American restaurant company

Dunkin' Brands Group, Inc.
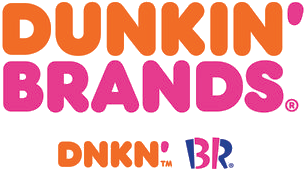

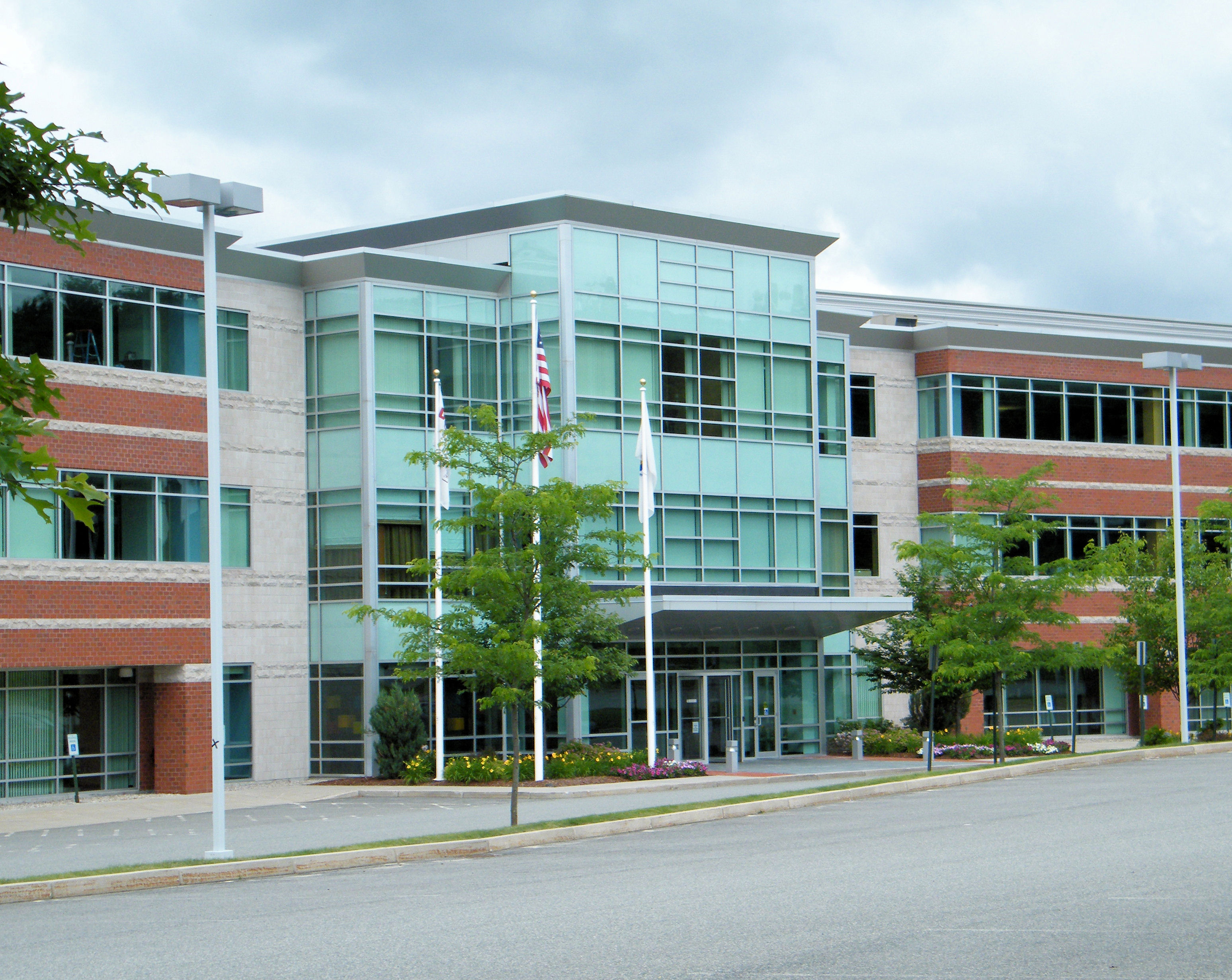
- Dunkin' Brands headquarters pictured in 2009
- Type: Public
- Traded as: Nasdaq: DNKN (2011–2020)
- Industry: Fast food restaurants
- Founded: 1994 as Allied Domecq Quick Service Restaurants; 2004; 22 years ago as Dunkin' Brands
- Defunct: December 15, 2020; 5 years ago
- Fate: Merged to Inspire Brands
- Successor: Inspire Brands
- Headquarters: Canton, Massachusetts, United States
- Area served: Worldwide
- Key people: Nigel Travis (executive chairman); David Hoffmann (CEO)
- Revenue: ▲US$860.5 million (2017)
- Operating income: ▲US$447 million (2017)
- Net income: ▲US$195.576 million (2016)
- Total assets: ▲US$3.227 billion (2016)
- Total equity: ▲US$-163.258 million (2016)
- Number of employees: ▲270,000 (2015)
- Subsidiaries: Baskin-Robbins; Dunkin'; Mister Donut

Dunkin' Brands Group, Inc. was an American restaurant holding company that ran three chains of fast-food restaurants: Dunkin' Donuts, Mister Donut, and Baskin-Robbins. It was headquartered in Canton, Massachusetts. It was acquired by Inspire Brands in 2020.

== History ==
=== Allied-Lyons ===
In 1973, British food company J. Lyons & Co. purchased Baskin-Robbins from United Brands. J. Lyons and Co. merged with Allied Breweries, becoming Allied-Lyons in 1978. In 1990, Allied-Lyons acquired Dunkin' Donuts and Mister Donut.

=== Allied Quick Service Restaurants ===
In 1994, Allied-Lyons merged with Pedro Domecq S.A., becoming Allied Domecq. The restaurant operations were merged under a subsidiary named Allied Domecq Quick Service Restaurants. In 1997, Togo's was acquired by Allied Domecq.

=== Dunkin' Brands ===
First logo of Dunkin' Brands

In 2004, Allied Domecq Quick Service Restaurants was renamed "Dunkin' Brands, Inc.". On December 12, 2005, Pernod Ricard, which had just taken control of Allied Domecq, announced the sale of Dunkin' Brands to a consortium of private equity firms consisting of Bain Capital, The Carlyle Group and Thomas H. Lee Partners for $2.425 billion in cash. Dunkin' Brands, Inc. was renamed "Dunkin' Brands Group, Inc." after the transaction.

On November 30, 2007, Dunkin' Brands sold Togo's to Mainsail Partners, a San Francisco-based private equity firm, in partnership with Tony Gioia, a former president of Baskin-Robbins.

In July 2011, Dunkin' Brands completed its initial public offering and became listed on the NASDAQ Global Select Market (NASDAQ-GS large cap) under the symbol "DNKN".

In August 2012, Dunkin' Brands became completely independent of private equity firms.

In October 2017, Dunkin' Brands announced the company would invest $100 million in United States locations of Dunkin’ Donuts’. The company also said they are considering a name change to the shortened Dunkin'. The name change is being tested in a California location and a new store in Quincy, Massachusetts.

On July 30, 2020, the organization announced it would permanently close 800 of its donut and coffee shops by the end of the year due to a sales slump caused by the coronavirus pandemic, primary locations inside convenience stores, namely Speedway.

Dunkin' Brands reported in October 2020 that negotiations were being held with the private equity-backed company Inspire Brands for Inspire to acquire the company. The potential deal includes Dunkin' Brands private stocks would be sold at $106.50 a share, a 20 percent premium over the closing prices reported on the 23rd of October, implying that the company is being evaluated at around $8.8 billion. A statement released by Dunkin' claimed that "there is no certainty that any agreement will be reached" and that no further comments will be released until an agreed-upon transaction is found. Shares of the Dunkin' Brand have reportedly risen 33% in 2020 because of the possible Inspire Brands' deal.

On October 30, 2020, Dunkin' Brands announced that it would be acquired by Arby's owner Inspire Brands in a transaction valued at $11.3 billion, including the assumption of Dunkin' Brands' debt. The deal closed on December 15, 2020. Dunkin' Brands ceased to exist as a separate company, with Dunkin', Baskin-Robbins, and the trademark management of Mister Donut, becoming part of Inspire Brands.

== Subsidiaries ==
- Baskin-Robbins
- Dunkin'
- Mister Donut
