= Franchise Times =

US business newspaper

Franchise Times is an American business publication covering franchising in the United States.

Their magazines have reports on franchising trends and legal issues, franchisor and franchisee success stories, family business matters, and interviews with celebrities who are involved in franchising.

== History ==
Franchise Times was created by Crain Communications in 1994 under the title Franchise Buyer. The name was changed in 1996 to Franchise Times.

In September 1998, John Hamburger, owner of Franchise Times Corp purchased the rights to the Franchise Times trademark, subscription and advertiser lists, copyright, web domain name, and back issues. He saw restaurant chains were moving into the franchise arena and wanted to expand his restaurant coverage to that growing trend.

Hamburger also purchased Continental Franchise Review (CFR), a newsletter that covered franchise developments, in 1998, combining it with Franchise Times. He hired the former publisher of CFR, Janet Sparks, to write editorials under the CFR trademark. She then moved to writing a monthly column until 2011. Mary Jo Larson, who was the publisher/editor of the Restaurant Finance Monitor became the new editor of the magazine. She also served as the first editor and is now publisher and vice president.

The new Franchise Times printed its first issue in 1999. That same year, the magazine published its first ranking of the Franchise Times Top 200 franchise companies based on worldwide sales and locations. The list also included the next 100 "up and comers." Franchise Times' list was different from others in that rankings were based solely on sales and unit counts. It has since expanded its list to the top 500 companies, under the trademark of the Top 200+.

== Research ==
Franchise Times publishes the Top 200+, a ranking of the 500 largest franchises based on worldwide sales in its October issues. The data—which also includes other data points such as number of units, both franchised and company-owned, and international units—is used by Franchise Times and others to track franchise growth and analyze trends in the various franchise segments in news stories.

"Fast and Serious", an editorial feature that identifies growing franchise systems, was launched in 2014. The results of the findings are published in March, along with analysis of the trends.

Franchise Times' Restaurant 200 is a ranking of the top restaurant franchisees in the U.S., compiled by its sister publication, the Restaurant Finance Monitor.

== Japanese edition ==
In 2003. Hamburger signed an agreement with franchise business consultant Roy Fujita to produce a Japanese edition of Franchise Times. It uses content from the U.S. publication, but sells its own advertising around it.

== Conferences ==
Franchise Times hosts a yearly conference in Las Vegas, the Franchise Finance & Growth Conference. CEOs and CFOs are invited there to talk about their brands before lenders, franchisors and multi-unit franchisees. The conference also provides educational and networking sessions. The Franchise Times Dealmakers of the Year are conferred on franchise companies and executives. Dealmakers is also a popular editorial feature in the April issue of the magazine.
