= Mooyah =

American fast casual restaurant chain

MOOYAH Franchising, LLC
- Trade name: MOOYAH Burgers, Fries & Shakes
- Company type: Private
- Industry: Food
- Genre: Fast casual restaurant
- Founded: 2007; 19 years ago in Plano, Texas, United States
- Founders: Rich Hicks; Todd Istre
- Headquarters: Plano, Texas, United States
- Number of locations: 100 (2020)
- Area served: United States; Canada; Saudi Arabia; Oman; United Arab Emirates; Qatar; Bahrain
- Key people: Mike Meche (President)
- Products: Hamburgers, french fries, hot dogs, soft drinks, milkshakes
- Revenue: US$ 72 million ▲ (2019)
- Owner: Balmoral Funds LLC; Gala Capital Partners
- Number of employees: 2,000 (2019)
- Website: mooyah.com

Mooyah (stylized as MOOYAH) is an American fast casual restaurant chain headquartered in Plano, Texas. The chain reached over 100 locations in 20 U.S. states and nine countries in 2016 in North America and the Middle East. They specialize in hamburgers, french fries, and shakes. They are known for their beef hamburgers which use Angus beef and their French-fries.

== History ==
Mooyah was founded by American veterans Rich Hicks and Todd Istre in 2007 in Plano. In 2013, the first international restaurant opened in Dubai, United Arab Emirates and was the 50th location opened. In 2016, its 100th location opened in Tuscaloosa, Alabama.

In May 2017, MOOYAH was sold to private equity firms Gala Capital Partners LLC and Balmoral Funds LLC for an undisclosed amount.

== Awards and recognition ==
MOOYAH was ranked on Fast Casual's Top Movers and Shakers list for eight consecutive years since 2009 and is ranked 2nd in Best Fast Casual Restaurant Franchise Company on Franchiserankings.com, a website that ranks franchises by their success. In 2017, Mooyah was named to Entrepreneur’s Franchise 500 list, 60th in Best Franchises Company USA, and Franchise Times Fast & Serious list that ranks the smartest-growing brands.

== See also ==
- List of franchises
- List of restaurant chains in the United States
