= Buffalo Wild Wings =

American sports bar and restaurant chain

- Logo since 2018
- Formerly: Buffalo Wild Wings & Weck (1982–1998)
- Type: Subsidiary
- Industry: Restaurant Franchising
- Founded: 1982; 44 years ago, in Columbus, Ohio, U.S. as Buffalo Wild Wings & Weck
- Founders: Jim Disbrow; Scott Lowery
- Headquarters: Sandy Springs, Georgia, U.S.
- Number of locations: 1,300+ (2024)
- Area served: United States; India; Mexico; Philippines; Saudi Arabia; Oman; United Arab Emirates; Panama
- Key people: Paul J. Brown; Tristan Meline
- Products: Chicken Wings, Burgers, Beer, Sides
- Parent: Inspire Brands (2018–present)
- Website: buffalowildwings.com

Buffalo Wild Wings (originally Buffalo Wild Wings & Weck, and often nicknamed BW3, or BDubs or BWW) is an American casual dining restaurant and sports bar franchise specializing in chicken wings.

As of March 2025, there are over 1,300 locations across all 50 U.S. states. The company is operated out of Sandy Springs, Georgia, home to its parent company, Inspire Brands, an inner-ring suburb of Atlanta.

== History ==
Buffalo Wild Wings & Weck first logo

Buffalo Wild Wings & Weck (BW3) was founded in 1982 by James Disbrow and Scott Lowery, whose parents were Disbrow's ice skating coaches and guardians when he was younger. Meeting up in Kent, Ohio, after Disbrow had finished judging an amateur figure skating competition at Kent State University, the pair were unable to locate a restaurant that served Buffalo-style chicken wings. They decided to open their own restaurant, selecting a location near Ohio State University in Columbus. The "Weck" in the original title refers to beef on weck, a sandwich originally served at the restaurant.

Within six months of opening, the pair brought on an additional partner, Mark Lutz. Over the next decade, they added six additional locations in Ohio, Indiana, and Steamboat Springs, Colorado. The company began to franchise in 1992 by working with Francorp, a Chicago-based law firm. The original franchise fee was $15,000 to $20,000 plus a percentage of sales. Its bottled wing sauces were then manufactured by Wilsey, Inc. of Atlanta. The company's headquarters was set up in 1992 in Cincinnati. By 1993, eight more locations were added, primarily in Ohio.

In late 1994, Disbrow hired a part-time chief financial officer, Sally Smith, who was employed at his new father-in-law's business. In order to get her full-time, the company moved its headquarters to the Minneapolis/Saint Paul area, where Smith wished to stay. Smith had to deal with issues with lenders and the Internal Revenue Service and a potential bankruptcy as a part of overhauling the firm's finances. Smith was unable to determine the firm's net income/loss prior to 1995, due to the trio's haphazard business practices. During 1995, the company did $12 million in revenue with a loss of $1.6 million.

Expecting more growth in 1995, BW3 designed a new prototype free-standing outlet with clear separation between the bar and dining areas and seating 190 in a 5,000- to 7,500-square-foot space. This was a shift in strategy from a college sports-bar to casual dining. The company looked closer at new franchisees' qualifications. Existing franchisees were encouraged to add more locations while more corporate locations were planned. At that time, there were 48 locations with 12 corporate owned.

Smith was promoted to president and CEO in August 1996, while Disbrow became chairman of the board. At the end of the year, 35 new locations were opened. An initial public stock offering was considered in 1998, but discarded given unfavorable market conditions. After using the name variations BW3 and Buffalo Wild Wings in different markets in its first national ad campaign, the decision was made that year to standardize the name throughout the system with the latter. The company moved to increase home sales of their sauces by upgrading the packaging.

The 100th location opened in October 1999 in Apple Valley, Minnesota, a short drive from its corporate headquarters. At the time, there were 23 company owned restaurants. Three venture capital firms and other purchased a majority stake, $8.5 million in shares, available in a December 1999 private placement. The funding was planned to fund expansion with expectation to have 260 sites by late 2003. The company tested several new sauces in 2000 but only added two to the menu with its first dessert. In 2000, the chain, now calling its locations Buffalo Wild Wings Grill & Bar, was in 19 states and 140 locations (at year end) with one finally in the city of its signature menu item, Buffalo, New York.

System-wide revenue was $150 million in 2001 with same-stores averaged growth of 8 percent per year. The company began pushing takeout sales. In late 2001, the company signed on Frito-Lay to its plans for branded potato chips to the retail market. In late September 2001, Buffalo Wild Wings opened its 100th franchised location in West Lafayette, Indiana, marking a significant milestone in the company's national expansion.

Disbrow died in October 2002, while Smith continued as company executive with Lowery as vice president of franchise construction. There were 211 locations in 27 states by the end of third quarter of 2003.

On November 21, 2003, Buffalo Wild Wings began trading on NASDAQ with the ticker symbol BWLD.

In 2010, the company announced an expansion into Canada. In 2015, Buffalo Wild Wings expanded in the United Arab Emirates when it opened a restaurant in Dubai. In March 2023, there were 12 Canadian locations, however by June, all Canadian locations closed down.

In March 2013, the company took a minority stake in PizzaRev upscale pizza restaurant. In August 2014, BW3 had purchased a majority stake in Rusty Taco chain and changed its name to R Taco the next year.

In November 2017, Roark Capital Group and The Wendy's Company, co-owners of Arby's Restaurant Group, announced its plan to purchase the chain for about $2.4 billion plus debt. This deal was completed on February 5, 2018 with Arby's Restaurant Group being renamed Inspire Brands and set up as the holding parent company to Arby's, Buffalo Wild Wings, and R Taco. In 2019, Buffalo Wild Wings announced a multiyear deal with MGM Resorts International and its sports betting venture Roar Digital. In 2020, Buffalo Wild Wings announced a national partnership the League of Legends Championship Series (LCS). During the 2022 NCAA Division I men's basketball tournament, Buffalo Wild Wings signed a sponsorship deal with Doug Edert, a breakout star of the Saint Peter's team that went on to become the first 15-seed ever to make a regional tournament final. (Note: Each of the four regionals in the main tournament draw has 16 teams, seeded from 1–16, with the regional winners advancing to the Final Four at a predetermined site.)

In June 2023, Buffalo Wild Wings had exited the Canadian market after closing its 5 remaining locations in Ontario.

== Concept ==
The chain is best known for Buffalo-style chicken wings along with a number of sauces, as well as other chicken products such as tenders and legs, and side dishes, appetizers, and desserts. Boneless chicken wings are often made from breast meat and prepared using various techniques.

== Gallery ==
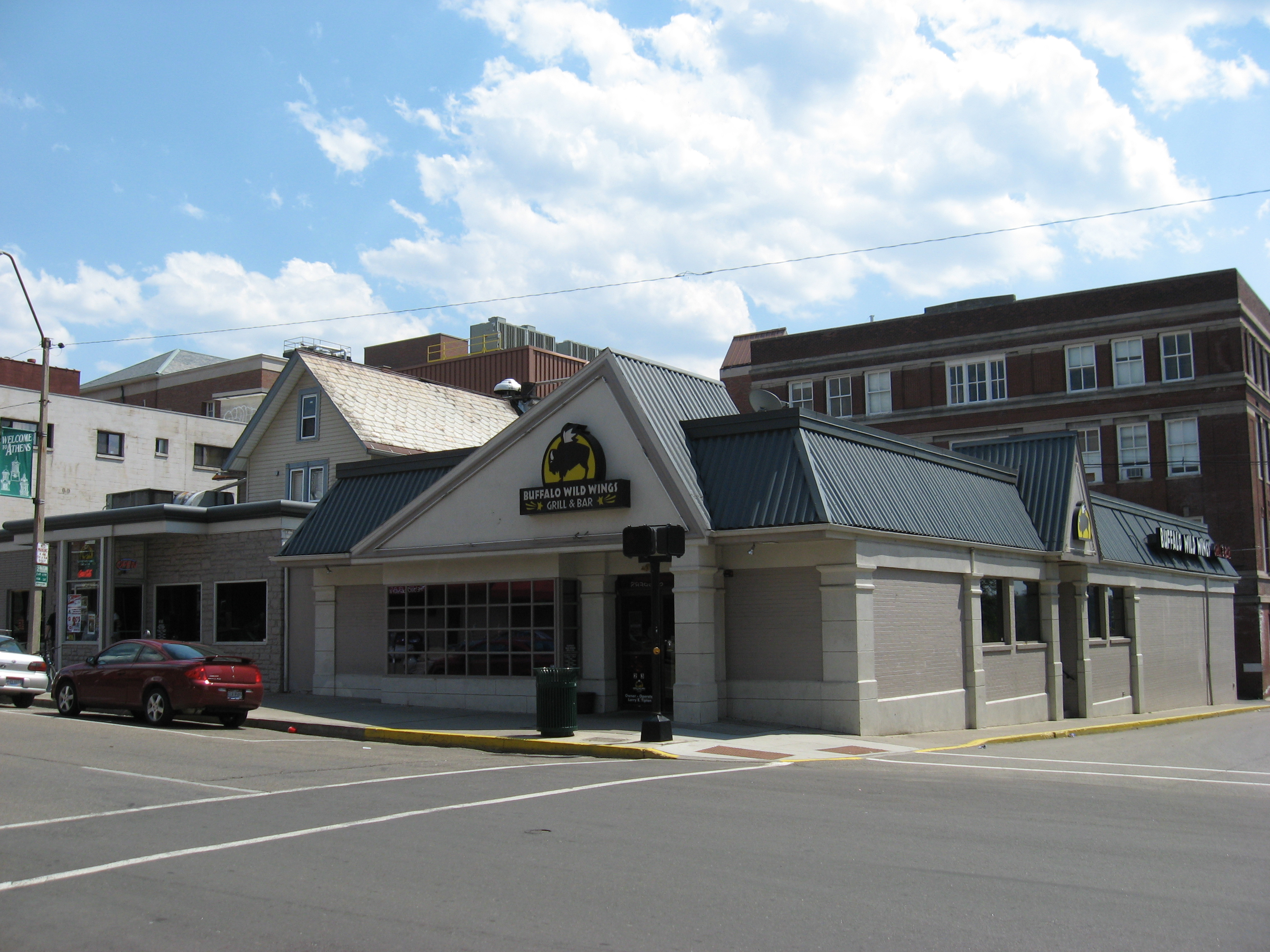
Buffalo Wild Wings location in Athens, Ohio

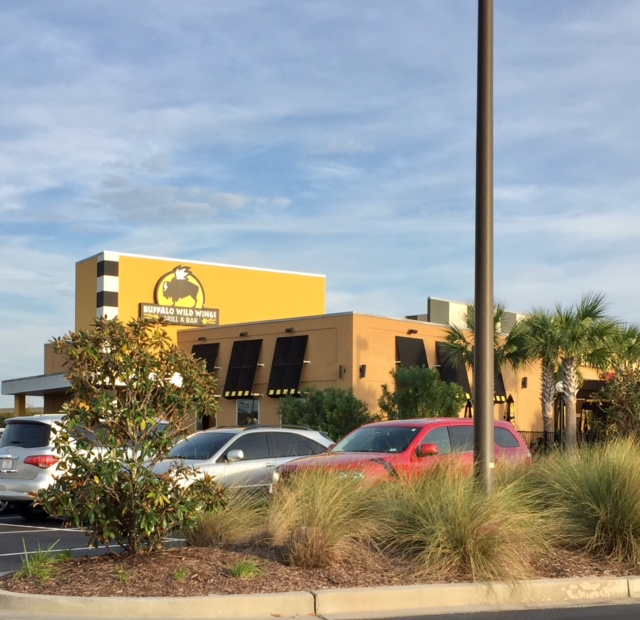
The exterior of a Buffalo Wild Wings location in Carolina Forest, South Carolina

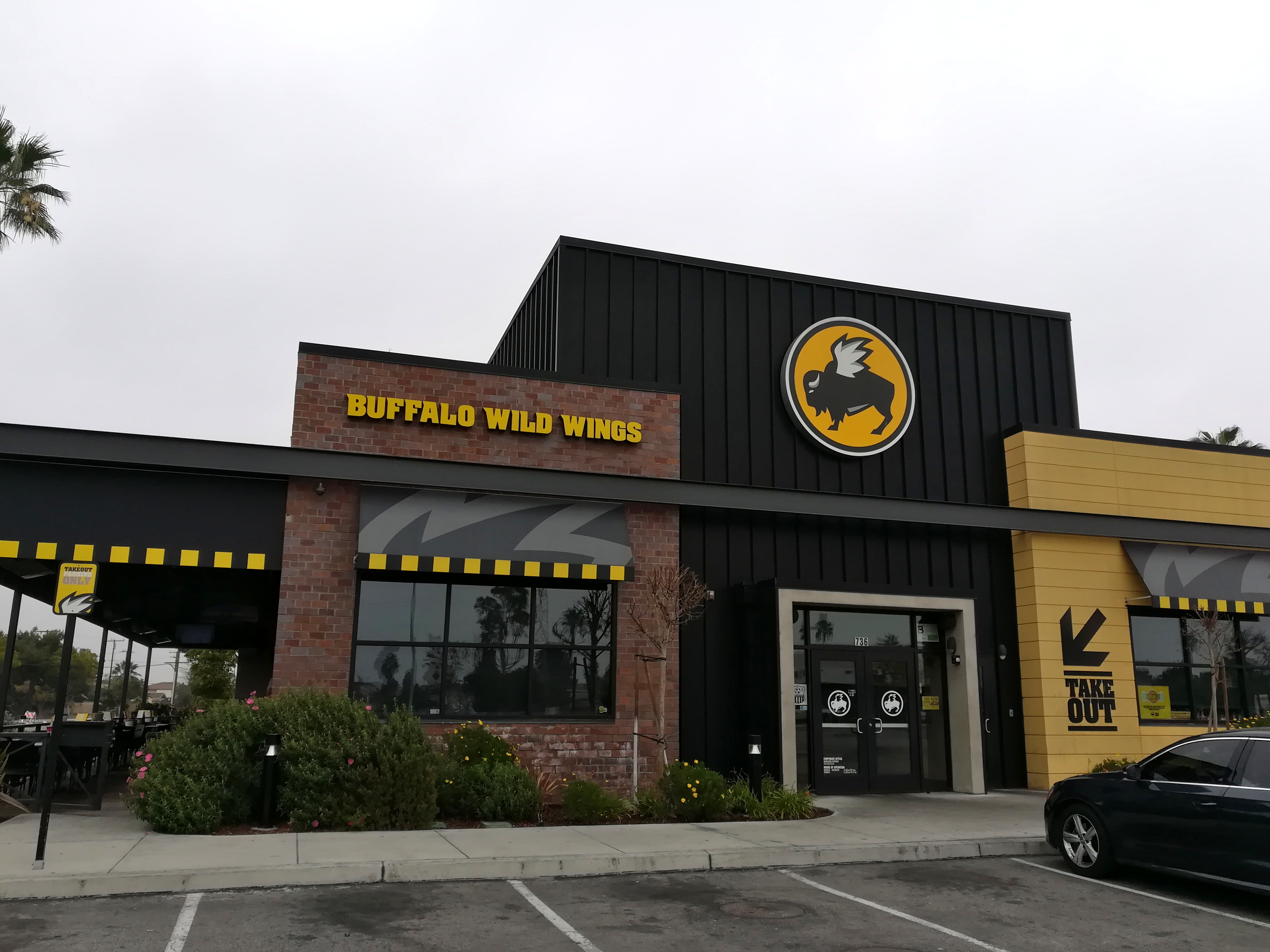
A Buffalo Wild Wings in Carson, California

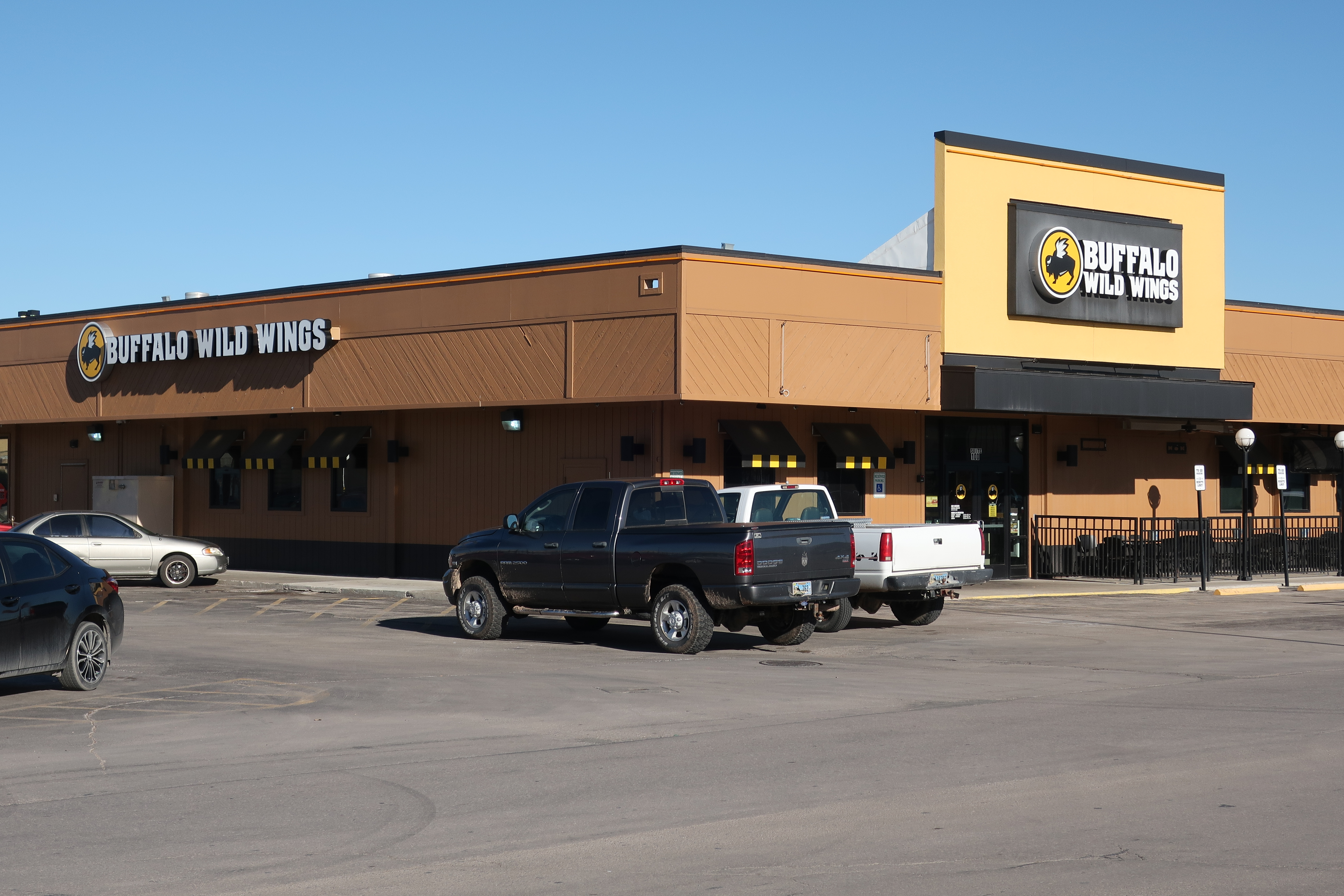
A Buffalo Wild Wings in Gillette, Wyoming

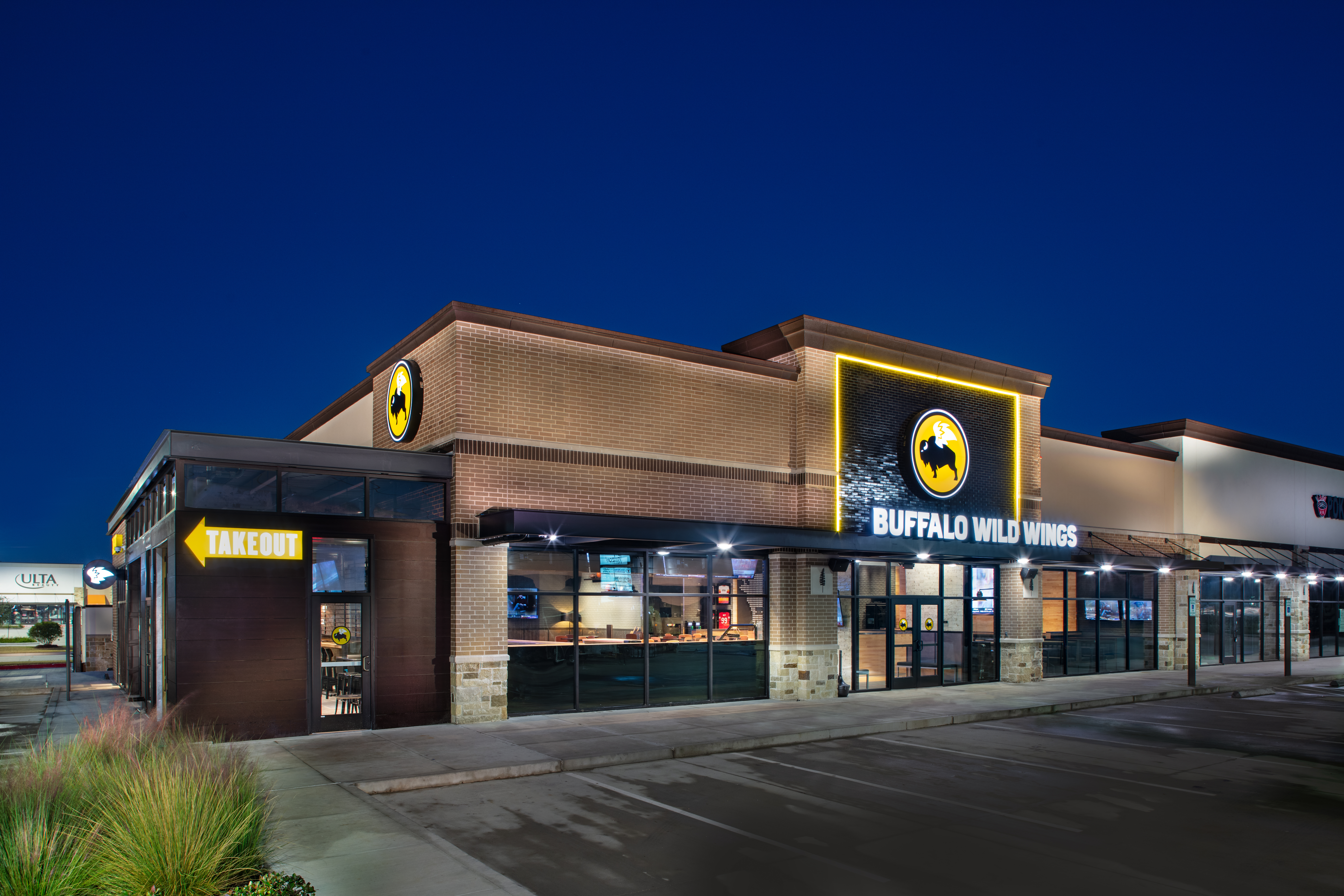
Buffalo Wild Wings sports bar located in New Caney, Texas

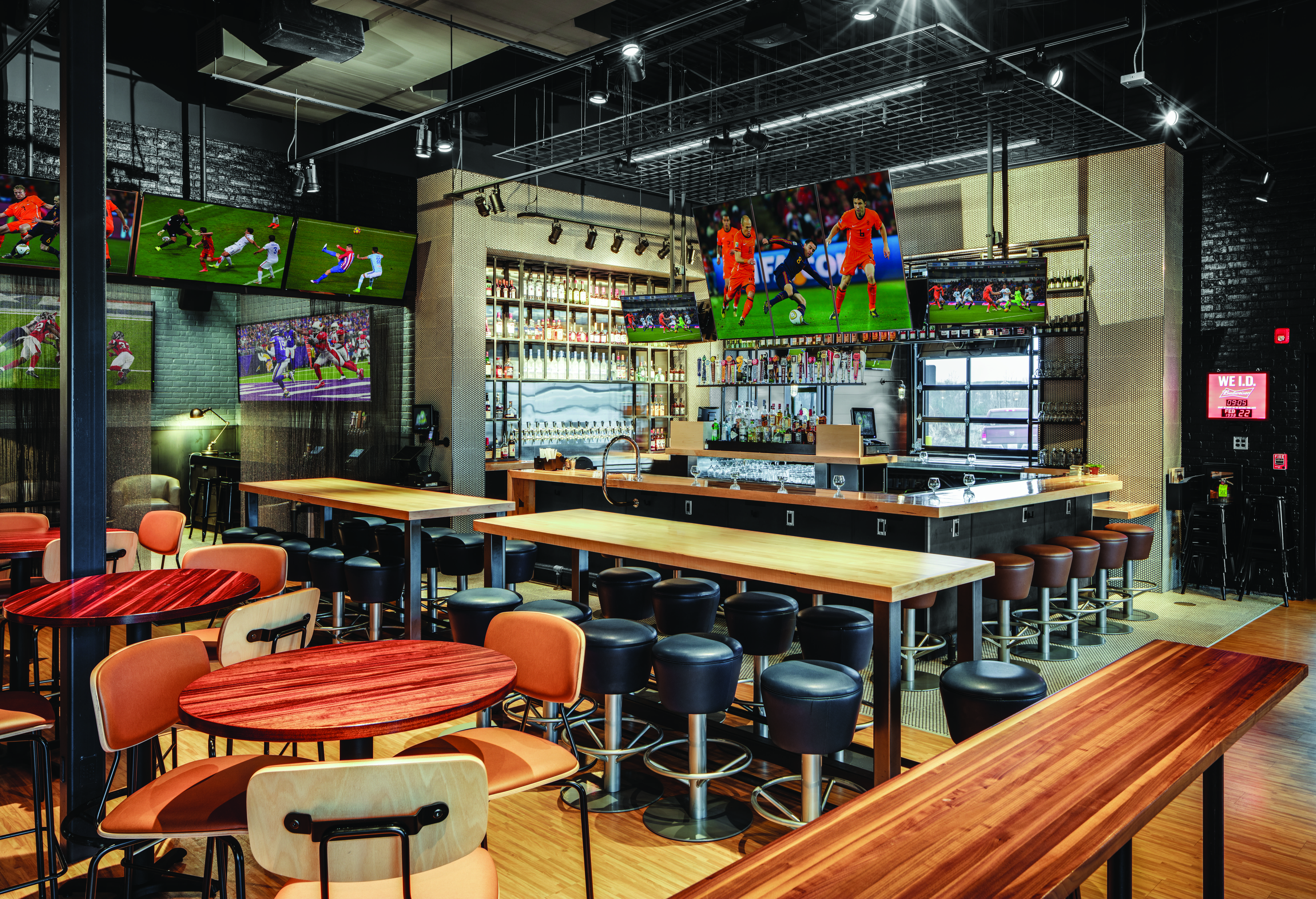
Interior of a Buffalo Wild Wings sports bar in Arden, North Carolina

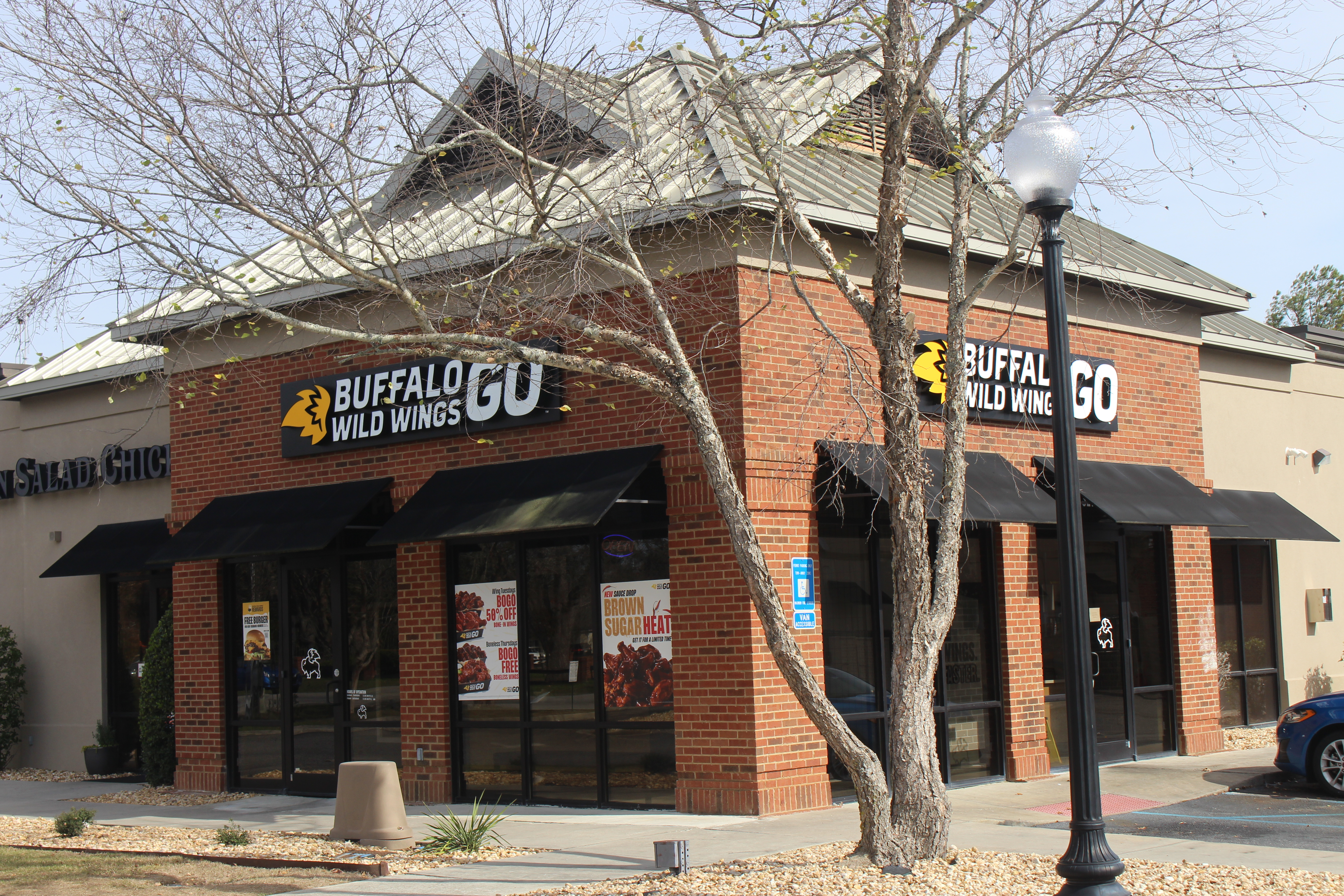
A Buffalo Wild Wings Go in Valdosta, Georgia

== See also ==
- List of chicken restaurants
