= Cicis Pizza =

American pizza buffet restaurant chain

Cici Enterprises, LP
- Logo

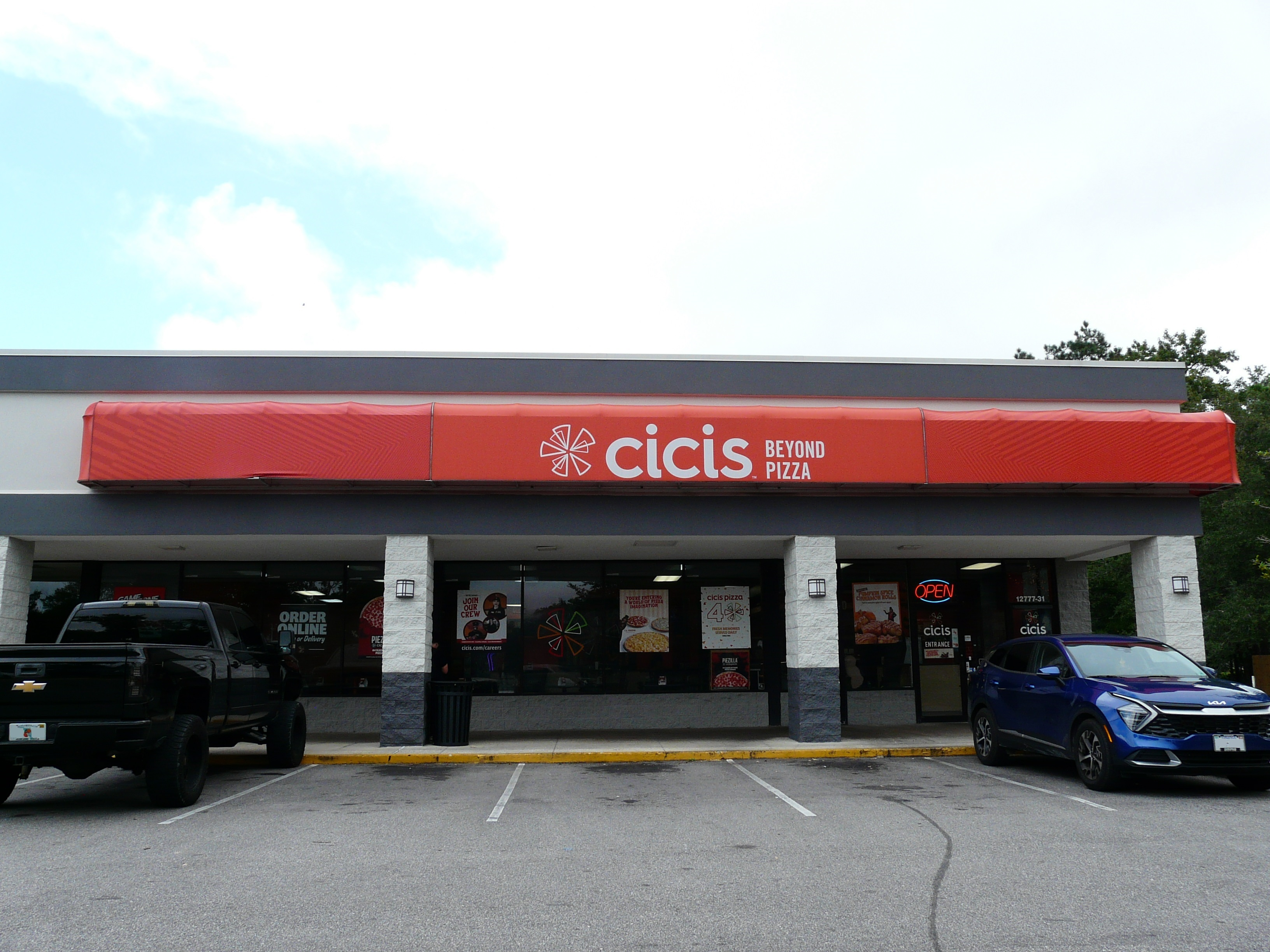
- Cicis in Jacksonville, Florida
- Trade name: Cicis Pizza
- Type: Private
- Industry: Restaurants Franchising
- Genre: Pizzeria; Buffet
- Founded: September 14, 1985; 41 years ago Plano, Texas, United States
- Founders: Joe Croce; Mike Cole
- Headquarters: Coppell, Texas
- Number of locations: 274 (2026)
- Key people: Jeff Hetsel (President and Franchise Owner)
- Products: Pizza, salad, pasta, chicken wings, desserts
- Owner: D&G Investors
- Website: www.cicis.com

Cici Enterprises, LP, doing business as Cicis Pizza (Note: Stylized in all lowercase and formerly stylized as CiCi's Pizza) and also known as simply Cicis, is an American chain of buffet restaurants based in Coppell, Texas, specializing in pizza. The company was founded in 1985, and started franchising by 1987. In November 2015, the company began a new marketing campaign which included the renaming of the company to Cicis (by dropping the apostrophe, making the second "C" lowercase and dropping "pizza" from its name), and a redesigned logo and website.

== History ==
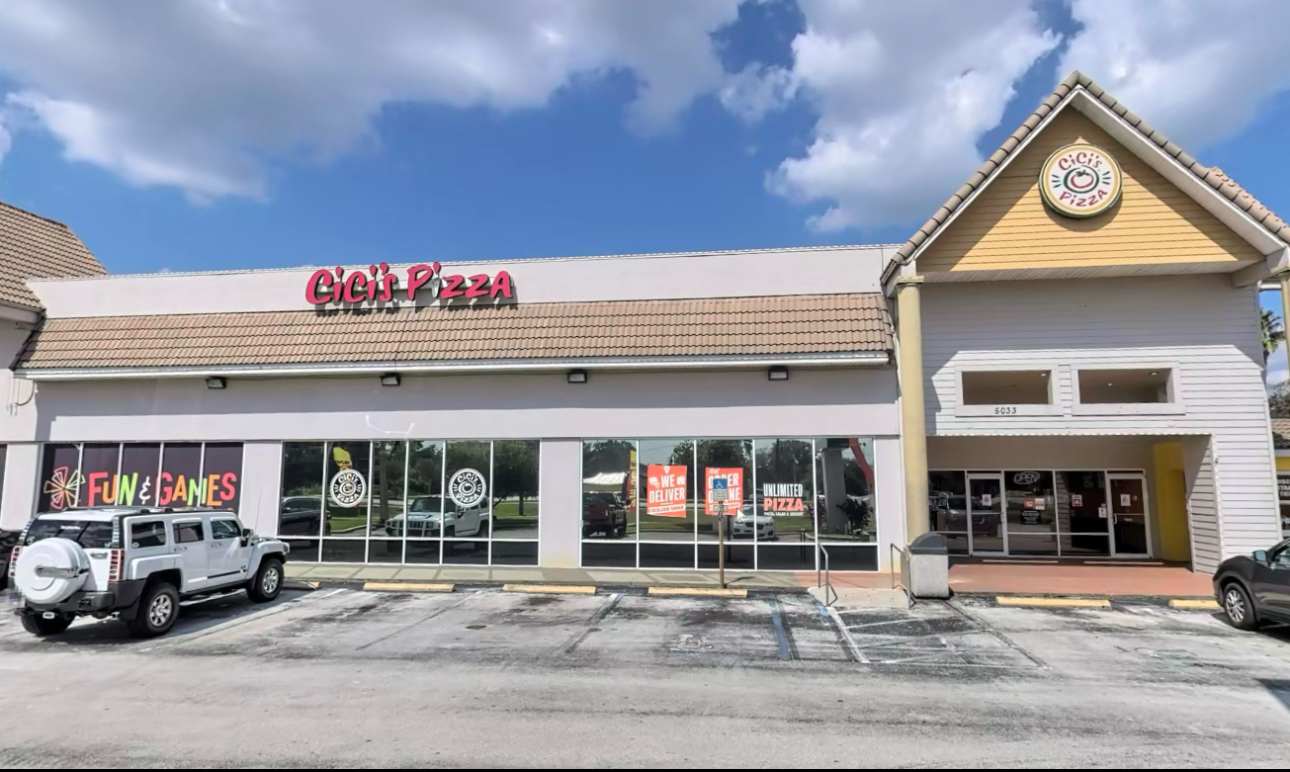
A CiCi's Pizza restaurant in Kissimmee, Florida in August 2025.

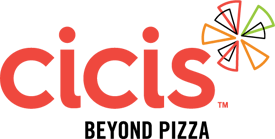
2015 to 2020 logo, when the "Pizza" was omitted from the name.

Cicis was founded in 1985 by Joe Croce and Mike Cole in Plano, Texas. In 2001, with 363 restaurants at the time, the chain expanded its buffet offerings and began remodeling restaurants. Four years later, CiCi's had more than 500 locations, and was the fastest-growing pizza chain in the United States.

In 2003, Croce retired from the business, and passed ownership of the company to the company's executive team. Craig Moore, who was a general manager in Dallas, became vice president of the company, a position he held for five years before he was named president after the sale. Croce gave 20% of his proceeds to Gateway Church, where he was a member. As president of the chain, Moore oversaw the company's operations and franchise growth. Moore announced his retirement in 2009, after 17 years with the company.

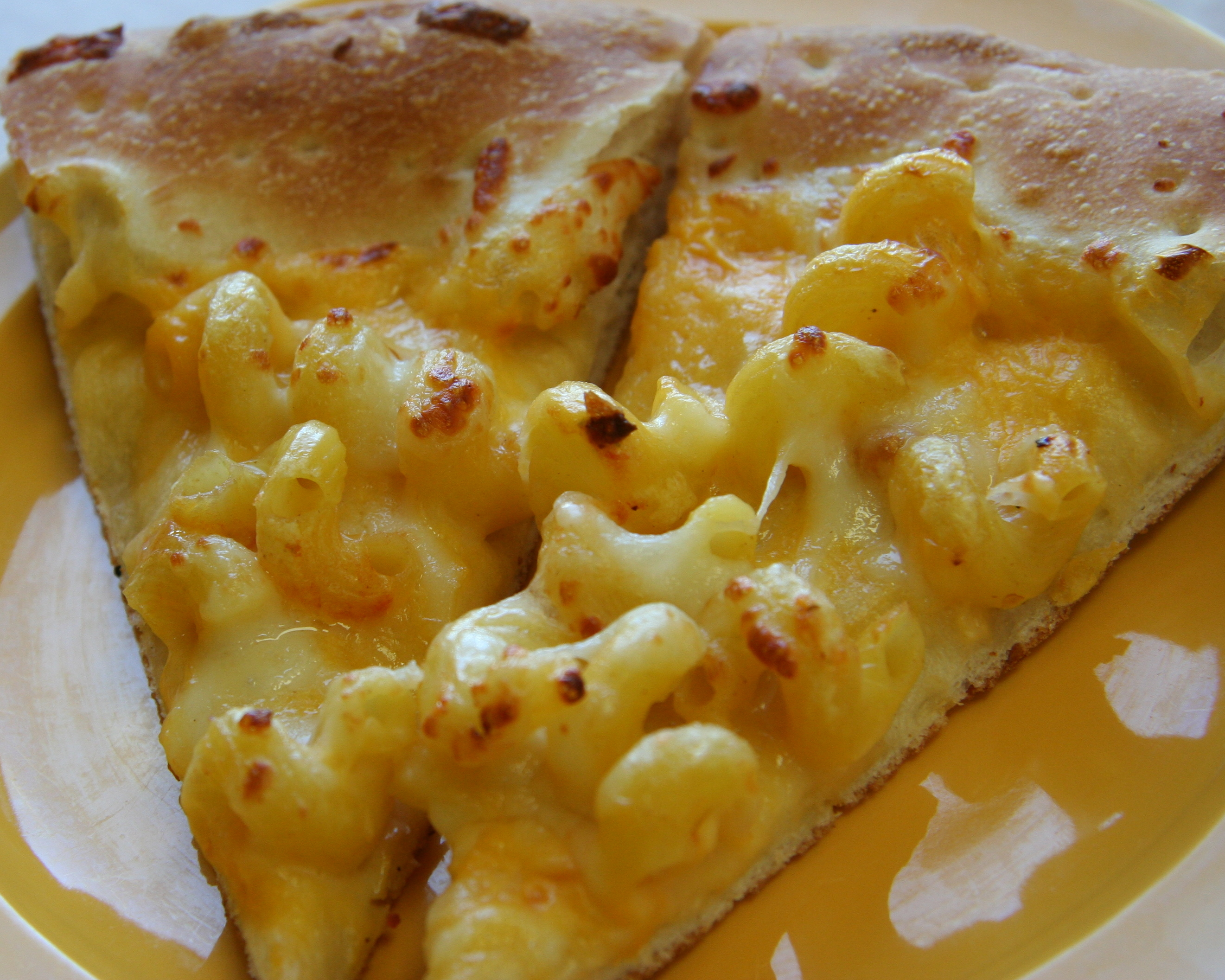
CiCi's macaroni and cheese pizza

Michael Shumsky, previously CEO of La Madeleine Restaurant, Inc. took over for Moore. Shumsky retired in August 2013 and Darin Harris took over as CEO of the company. Harris left the company in January 2018 and was replaced by Bill Mitchell as interim CEO. Mitchell was appointed to the position permanently in March 2018.

In addition to its current restaurants, in 2010 Cicis announced plans to add another 500 restaurants in the next 10 years (with the possibility of expanding internationally into Canada and Mexico). CiCi's has won numerous awards and has also been named one of the top 25 performing brands by The Wall Street Journal and a top 200 franchise concept by Franchise Today. The award for worst restaurant ideas has also been awarded to the pizza chain.

Cicis pizza comes with traditional varieties such as pepperoni, meat-lovers, veggie, supreme and Hawaiian, but also has specialty pizzas such as macaroni and cheese, barbeque pork and Buffalo chicken. In 2022, the chain even offered a giant 28 inch pizza called "Piezilla".

In November 2015, the company began a new marketing campaign which included the simplified renaming of the company to just Cicis with the modifier "Beyond Pizza," along with the addition of a new logo and redesigned website. The campaign is aimed at proving that Cicis has more to offer than just pizza.

Cicis offers many additional items including chicken wings, pasta, salads and soups, dessert pizzas, cinnamon buns, and fudge brownies.

Cicis filed for Chapter 11 bankruptcy in 2021 due to the effects of the COVID-19 pandemic; it had not benefitted from delivery due to its buffet model. It had recently reached an agreement to sell itself as well as its $82 million in liabilities to its primary lender, D&G Investors. Just two months after filing, Cicis emerged from bankruptcy and completed its sale.

On January 19, 2026, Cicis Pizza collaborated with Twitch streamer CaseOh for a year-long partnership. During a stream, he made a homemade version of Cicis Macaroni & Cheese Pizza. Cicis also temporarily renamed their Macaroni & Cheese Pizza to Mac & CaseOh Pizza as a promotion during the collaboration.

=== Recognition and awards ===
From 2004 to 2009, CiCi's Pizza held third place in the pizza category for Restaurants & Institutions' "Consumers' Choice in Chains" contest, which is judged based on consumer reviews of the competing restaurant chains. In March 2009 Men's Health gave CiCi's Pizza "top marks" in providing healthy food choices among its list of "66 major chain restaurants".

== See also ==
- List of buffet restaurants
