= Arby's =

American sandwich chain based in Sandy Springs, Georgia

Arby's Restaurant Group, Inc.
- Logo since 2013

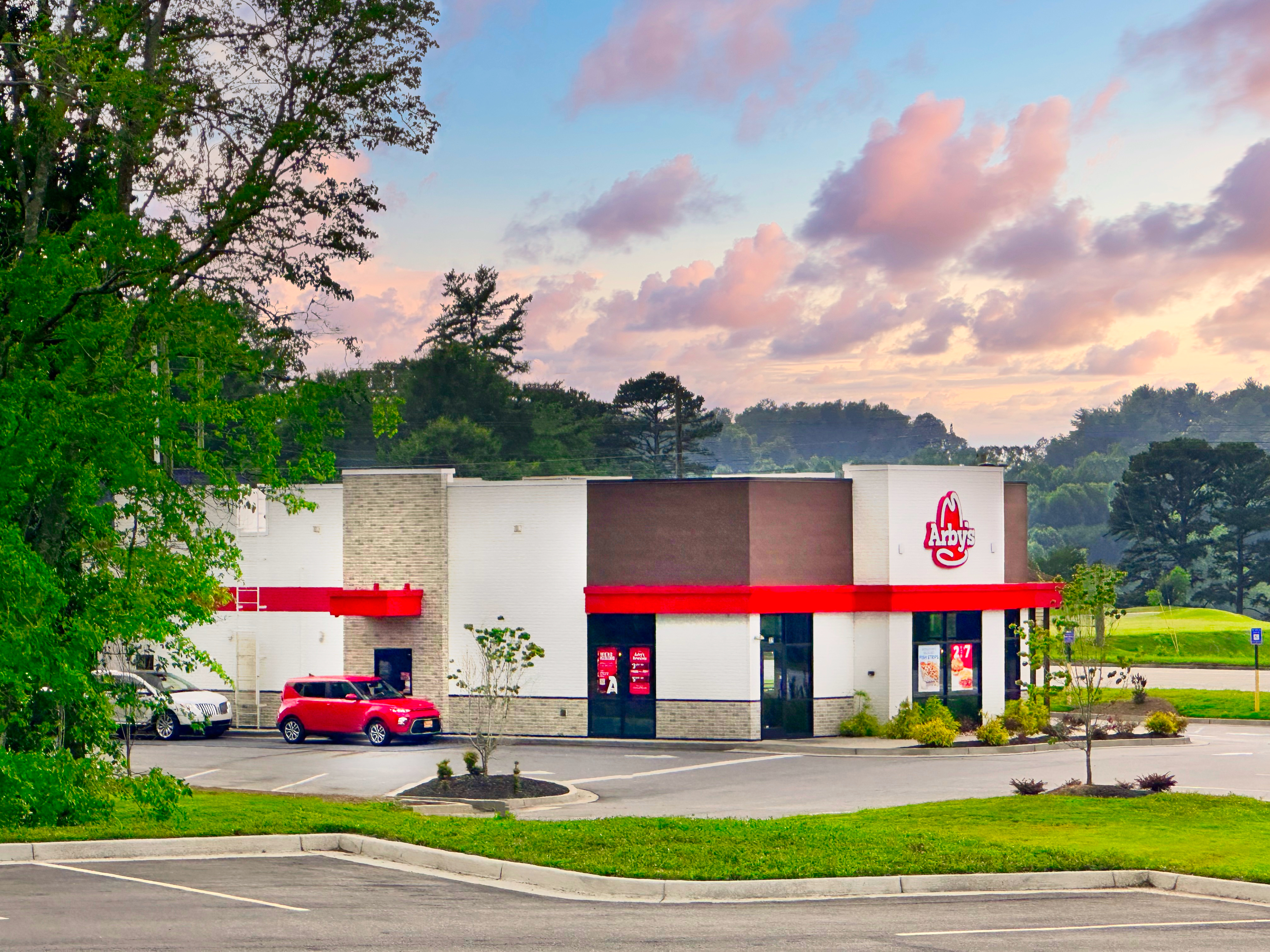
- An Arby's restaurant in Blairsville, Georgia
- Trade name: Arby's
- Type: Subsidiary
- Industry: Restaurants
- Founded: July 23, 1964; 62 years ago, in Boardman, Ohio, U.S.
- Founders: Forrest Raffel; Leroy Raffel
- Headquarters: Sandy Springs, Georgia, United States
- Number of locations: 3,206 (as of 2026)
- Area served: United States (incl. Puerto Rico); Canada; Costa Rica; Egypt; Japan; Mexico; Saudi Arabia; South Korea; Turkey
- Key people: Paul Brown (CEO, Inspire Brands); Jim Taylor (president)
- Products: Fast food Sandwiches, salads, sides
- Services: Franchising
- Revenue: ▲US$3.884 billion (2019)
- Number of employees: 80,000 (2019)
- Parent: Inspire Brands
- Website: arbys.com

Arby's Restaurant Group, Inc., doing business as Arby's, is an American fast food sandwich restaurant chain with more than 3,200 restaurants. The flagship property of Inspire Brands, it ranked third in systemwide sales in the United States in the quick-service and fast-casual restaurant industries in 2012, behind Subway and Panera Bread. In October 2017, Food & Wine called Arby's "America's second largest sandwich chain (after Subway)".

Roark Capital Group acquired 81.5% of Arby's Restaurant Group in July 2011 and is now a majority-owner of Inspire Brands. The Wendy's Company held a minority stake of 18.5% in Arby's after the acquisition by Roark Capital. That share was reduced to 12.3% upon the purchase of Buffalo Wild Wings. It was sold back to Inspire Brands on August 16, 2018 for $450 million, a 38% premium.

Arby's is best known for selling roast beef sandwiches. Other menu items the chain is known for include gyros, wraps, chicken sandwiches, and milkshakes. Its headquarters are in Sandy Springs, Georgia, a suburb of Atlanta that uses Atlanta mailing addresses. As of August 2026, there were 3,206 restaurant locations, down from 3,472 in 2019. There are locations in seven countries outside the United States: Canada, Costa Rica, Egypt, Mexico, Saudi Arabia, South Korea and Turkey.

== History ==
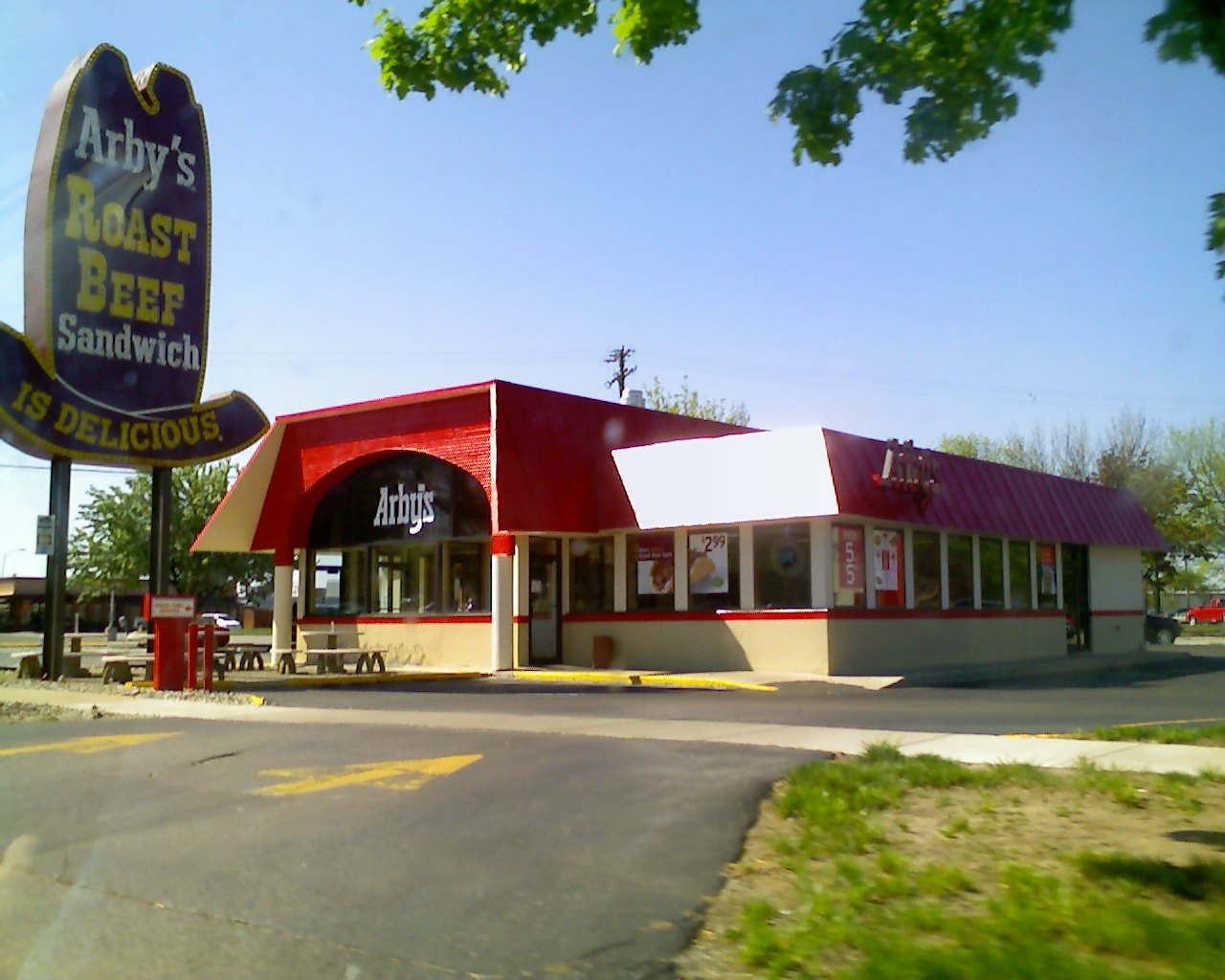
An Arby's restaurant with a vintage sign in Midland, Michigan (2006)

Arby's was founded in Boardman Township, Ohio, on July 23, 1964, by brothers Forrest (1922–2008) and Leroy Raffel (1927–2023), owners of a restaurant equipment business who thought there was a market opportunity for a fast food franchise based on a dish other than hamburgers. They wanted to call their restaurants "Big Tex", but that name was already used by an Akron business. Instead, they chose the name Arby's, a phonetic pronunciation of the letters R and B, short for "Raffel brothers".

The Raffel brothers opened the first new restaurant in Boardman, Ohio, on July 23, 1964. They initially served only roast beef sandwiches, potato chips, and soft drinks. Hoping to attract a more upscale clientele, Arby's interior design was intentionally more luxurious in appearance than the typical fast-food sandwich stand of the day. Arby's offered their roast beef sandwiches for 69 cents at a time when hamburger stands were charging 15 cents for a hamburger. A year later, the first Arby's licensee opened a restaurant in Akron, Ohio. Early Arby's locations featured neon signage designed to resemble a cowboy hat, often bearing the text "Arby's roast beef sandwich is delicious". This sign was designed by the Peskin Sign Co.

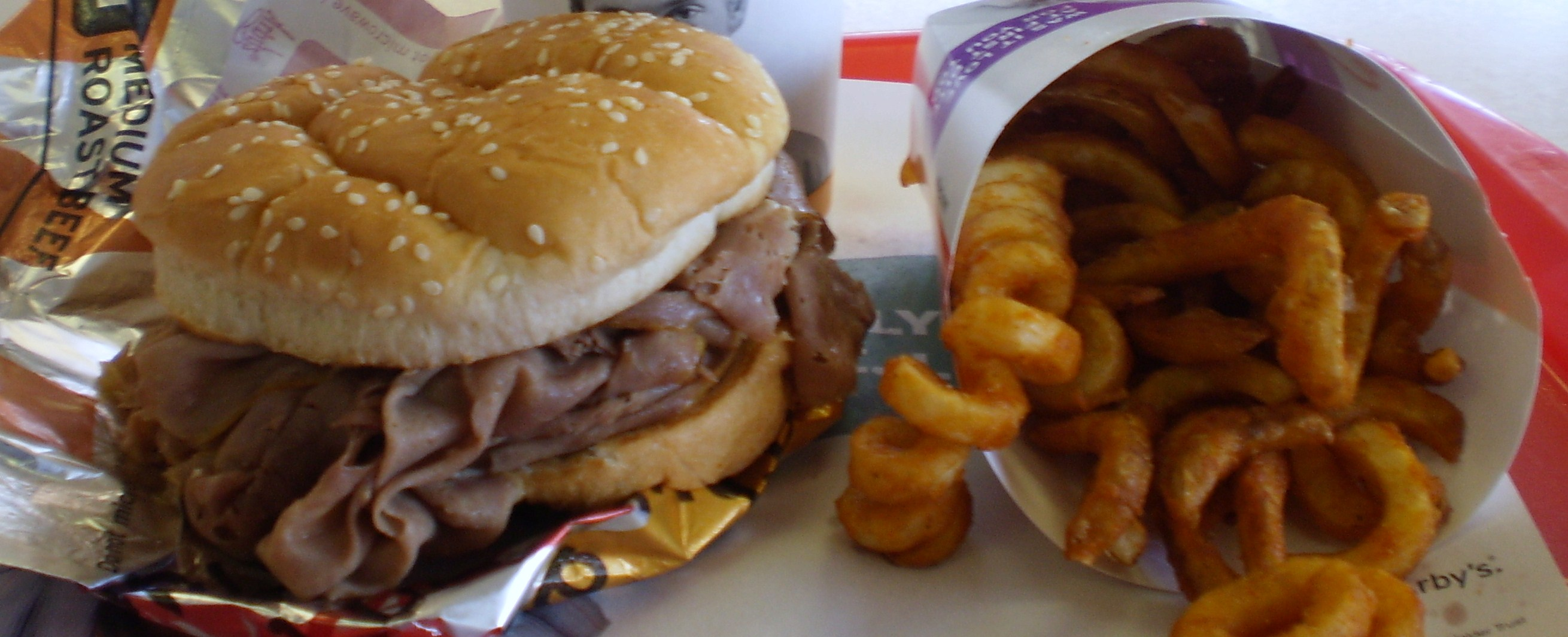
Arby's medium roast beef with fries

During the 1970s, the expansion of Arby's took place at a rate of 50 stores per year. During this time it created several menu items, including the Beef 'n Cheddar, Jamocha Shakes, chicken sandwiches, curly fries, and two signature sauces: Arby's Sauce and Horsey Sauce. Baked potatoes were added to the menu in 1985. Curly fries were initially introduced as Curly-Q Fries in 1988. It became the first restaurant in the fast food industry to offer a complete "lite" menu in 1991 with several sandwiches and salads under 300 calories and 94 percent fat-free.

The family-owned business tried converting into a public company in 1970 by offering the sale of stock, but the IPO never went through when the stock market subsequently fell. Arby's filed for reorganization with the United States bankruptcy court in February 1971, owing to a large number of debts accrued in expansion, as well as a nationwide recession and relatively high price point compared to other fast-food chains of the time. In 1976, the family sold the company to RC Cola for $18 million and Leroy Raffel remained as CEO until his retirement three years later.

In 1984, Victor Posner obtained Arby's via a hostile takeover of its then parent Royal Crown through his DWG Corporation. Nine years later, with a new owner of DWG Corporation and a new name, Triarc Companies, Inc., a former PepsiCo executive, Don Pierce, was brought in to "resurrect" Arby's. With $100 million additional funding, Pierce moved to a new "Roast Town" concept, similar in format to Boston Market, in 1996. The Roast Town concept received poor marks in market tests and was quickly discontinued. Pierce and his team left the company and it sold all of its 354 company-owned locations to RTM Restaurant Group, an existing Arby's franchise, for $71 million. Another marketing concept that was tried was a dual-brand venture that was started in 1995 with ZuZu's Handmade Mexican Grill. The marketing venture was a failure resulting in lawsuits being filed by each company against the other.

In 1990, Arby's would acquire Daddy-O's Express, a double drive-through hamburger chain. The chain would expand to 13 locations with all closing by the late 90's.

In 1992, Les Franchises P.R.A.G. Inc. opened the first Arby's franchise in the Canadian province of Quebec. It was also the 100th location to open in Canada and joins other locations that were then operating in the provinces of Ontario, Alberta, New Brunswick, Nova Scotia, Manitoba, British Columbia, and Saskatchewan. The Quebec location also sold the uniquely French-Canadian dish called poutine.

In 2002, Arby's returned to operating restaurants by purchasing the second largest Arby's franchisee, Sybra Inc., with 293 locations out of bankruptcy outbidding RTM so as to prevent RTM from becoming too large. RTM was purchased by Arby's on July 25, 2005.

In November 2002, Access Now filed a lawsuit against RTM, then a franchise of Triarc, that some 800 of their stores did not comply with the Americans with Disabilities Act of 1990 (ADA). The lawsuit had no liability damages except for lawyer fees. In August 2006, the court accepted the settlement between RTM and Access Now. The result was that every year, 100 of the RTM stores would be retrofitted to comply with the ADA. Accordingly, it was estimated that about $1.2 million would be spent to retrofit those stores each year.

In 2008, Triarc purchased Wendy's, and changed its name to Wendy's/Arby's Group, to reflect their core businesses. In January 2011, it was announced that Wendy's/Arby's Group was looking into selling the Arby's side of the business to focus on the Wendy's brand. It was officially announced the companies would split on January 21, 2011. In 2009, the Wendy's/Arby's Group signed a franchise deal with the Al Jammaz Group of Saudi Arabia to open dual-branded Wendy's/Arby's through the Middle East with the first location opening in Dubai in the United Arab Emirates in May 2010. The Wendy's/Arby's Group also signed a similar franchise deal in June 2010 with Tab Gida Sanayi ve Ticaret to open dual-branded restaurants in Turkey. After the split, the former Wendy's/Arby's Group became The Wendy's Company.

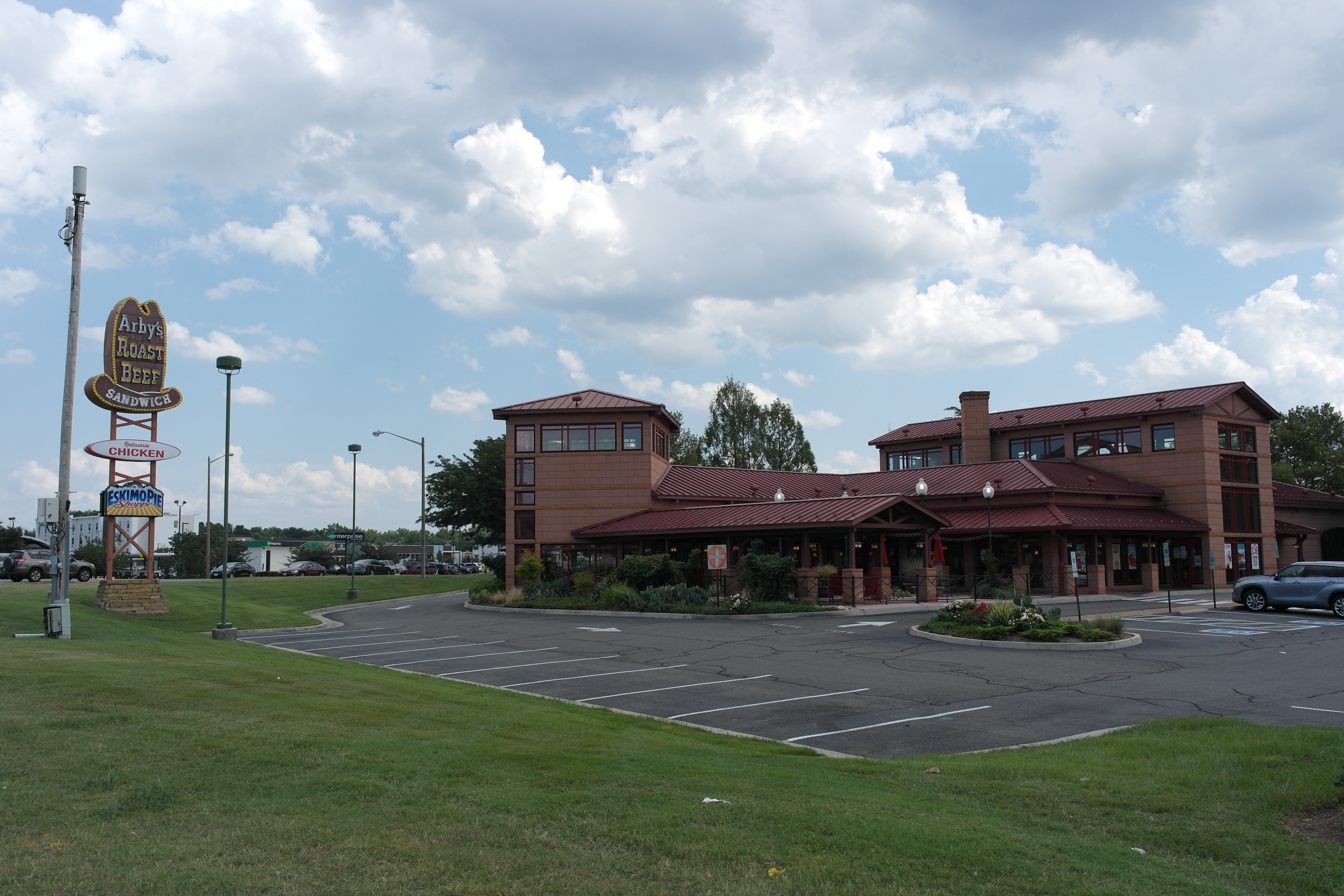
Arby's restaurant in Colonial Heights, Virginia. This is the largest Arby's restaurant in the chain.

In 2010, Arby's opened a restaurant at Ft. Bliss, their first location at an American military base under a deal that the Wendy's/Arby's Group had signed with the Army and Air Force Exchange Service to open restaurants at bases both in the United States and overseas. Only American military personnel and some of their guests can patronize the Arby's locations situated on the military bases and operated by the Post Exchange.

There were two different attempts to operate franchises in the United Kingdom. GSR Restaurant Group opened their first Arby's franchise location in London in 1992 followed by a second location the following year in Glasgow. These were also the first locations to open in Europe, but both were forced to close by 1994. In 2001, Barown Restaurants opened two Arby's franchise locations in Southampton, Hampshire, and Sutton, London, but both were forced to close after operating for a few months.

On June 13, 2011, Wendy's/Arby's Group Inc. announced that it would sell the majority of its Arby's chain to Roark Capital Group while maintaining an 18.5% stake in the company. At the time of the sale, Arby's was experiencing an operating loss for the year of $35 million with 350 Arby's franchisees more than 60 days late in royalty payments and 74 low performing franchised units and 96 company-owned units forced to close. Despite its cash flow problem, Arby's also reported that it had six months of sales growth at established stores in the United States which it had attributed to its new turnaround plan that it had recently launched. The new owners turned the company around by closing more underperforming locations, changing the company's marketing strategy, and by introducing new products on a regular basis. After four years, Arby's was able to issue $300 million in dividends, which resulted in Wendy's receiving $54.9 million for its minority stake with the remainder paid to Roark.

In February 2017, Arby's investigated a malware attack on its payment system that targeted thousands of customer credit and debit cards. The malware was placed on point-of-sale systems inside Arby's corporate-owned restaurants, not its locations owned by franchisees, and was active between October 25, 2016, and January 19, 2017. Eight credit unions and banks from Alabama, Arkansas, Indiana, Louisiana, Michigan, Pennsylvania and Montana have filed suit since early February against Arby's concerning the data breach.

In September 2017, Arby's returned to Kuwait for the first time in two decades by the opening of an Arby's franchise in Jabriya by Kharafi Global.

In November 2017, Arby's announced it had negotiated a purchase for the restaurant chain Buffalo Wild Wings for $2.4 billion in cash. As part of this acquisition, the parent was renamed from Arby's Restaurant Group, Inc. to Inspire Brands.

In October 2018, Arby's expanded into the North African country of Egypt by opening three restaurants in the capital city of Cairo with the help of local franchise partner Vantage Egypt Tourism and Entertainment.

In January 2022, Arby's announced launching in Saudi Arabia in an exclusive development agreement with Shahia Foods Limited Company, with the first restaurants expected to open in the capital city of Riyadh in late 2022. This agreement marks the brand's first-ever entry into Saudi Arabia and largest expansion into the Middle East to-date.

== Products ==
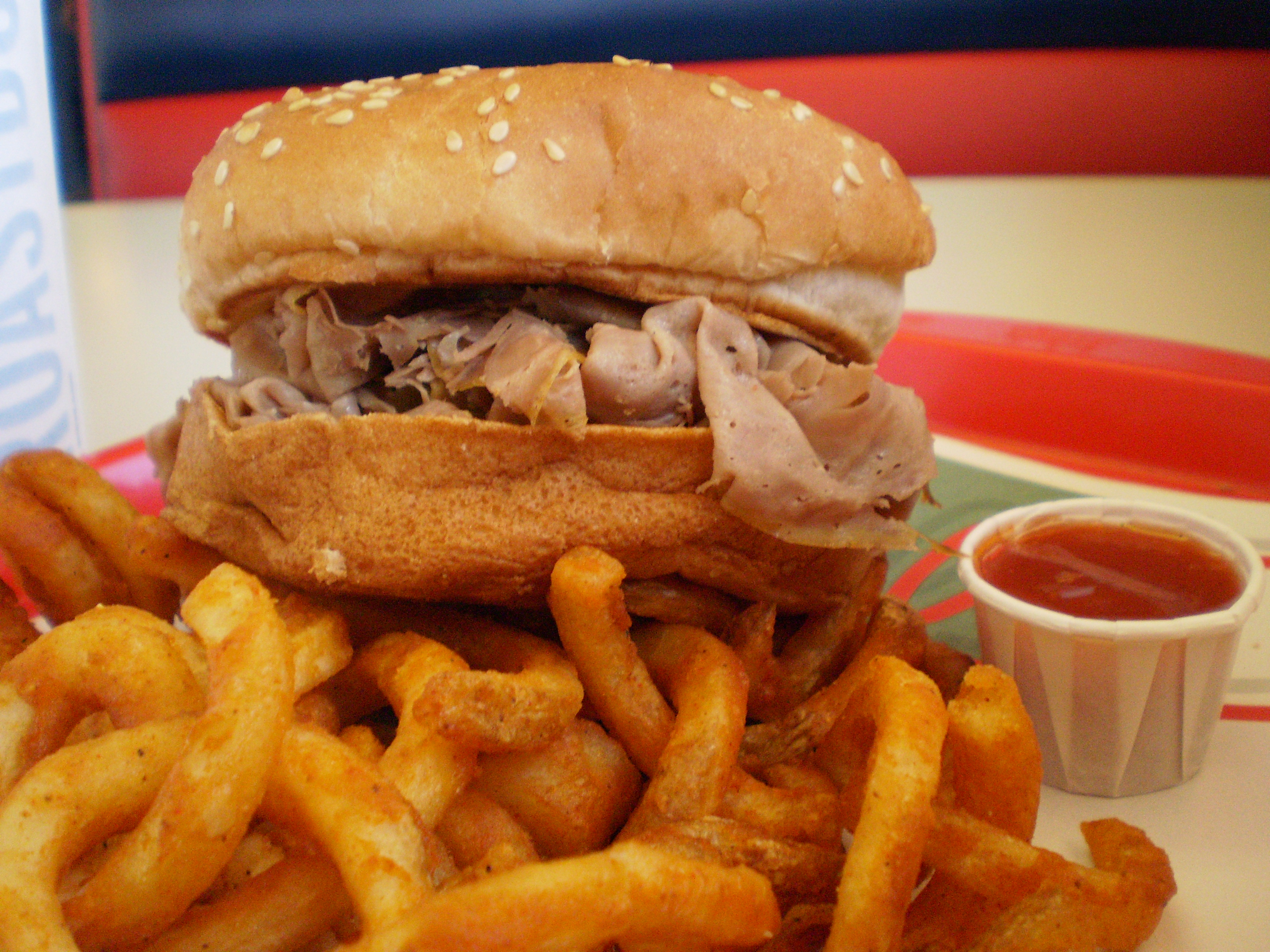
Arby's medium roast beef sandwich with curly fries

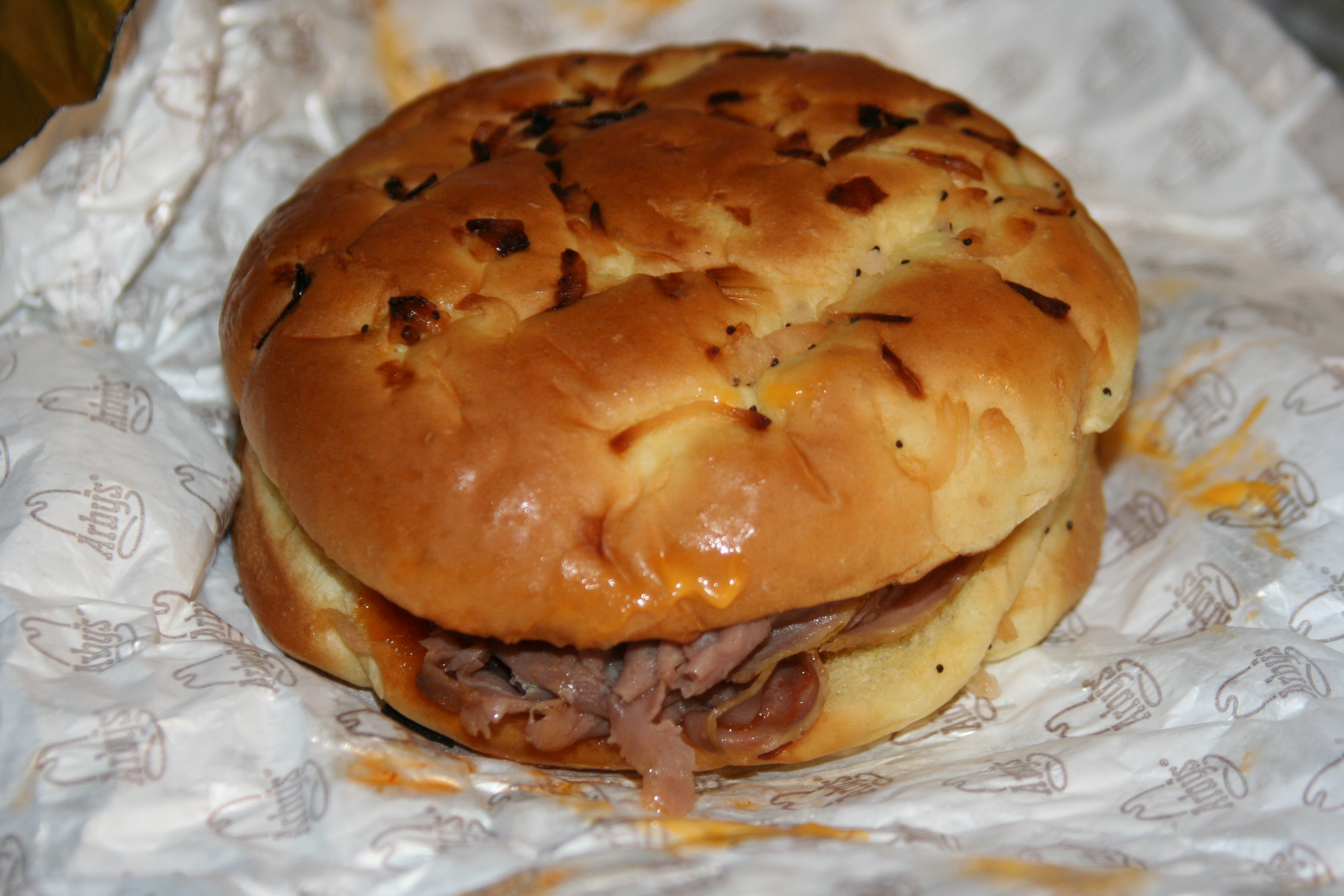
"Beef-n-Cheddar" sandwich

In addition to roast beef, deli style sandwiches, called "Market Fresh Sandwiches," are sold at Arby's. The original lineup of sandwiches included Roast Beef and Swiss, Roast Turkey and Swiss, Roast Ham and Swiss, and Roast Chicken Caesar. With the exception of the Chicken Caesar, all Market Fresh Sandwiches came with the standard toppings of spicy brown honey mustard, mayonnaise, red onion rings, green leaf lettuce, tomato slices and sliced Swiss cheese. Additions to the Market Fresh lineup included Roast Turkey Ranch and Bacon and the Ultimate BLT. Market Fresh Five-Star Club, served on Harvest White Bread, was introduced in 2003 for a limited time.

The Ultimate BLT was released for a limited time in 2002 and later in 2012.

In 2003, the line was again expanded to include other styles of specialty sandwiches that were served on baguettes that included the Italian Beef 'n Provolone, French Dip 'n Swiss, Philly Beef Supreme, and Pot Roast sandwiches.

Corned beef and turkey Reuben sandwiches were added to the menu in 2005.

In early 2006, Arby's Restaurant Group signed a contract with Pepsi, making Pepsi the chain's exclusive soft drink provider. Franchises which had contracts with Coca-Cola switched to Pepsi-Cola when their contracts with Coca-Cola expired.

It was announced in August 2017, that Coca-Cola had won a contract to serve Coke products at all its restaurants, ending an almost 11-year association with Pepsi. The transition began in early 2018, and all Arby's locations were serving Coca-Cola beverages by June 19, 2018. Arby's promoted their announcement by breaking two Guinness World Records. The first record, "world's smallest advertisement", measured 38.3 microns by 19.2 microns on a sesame seed and was printed at Georgia Tech. The second record, "largest advertising poster", took up approximately 5 acres of land and was placed in Monowi, Nebraska, America's smallest town.

Toasted Subs, sandwiches served on a toasted ciabatta roll, were first introduced in September 2007. The initial line-up included the French Dip & Swiss Toasted Sub, Philly Beef Toasted Sub, Classic Italian Toasted Sub, and Turkey Bacon Club. Three months later, the Toasted Subs product line was extended to include the Meatball Toasted Sub and the Chicken Parmesan Toasted Sub.

In October 2013, Arby's introduced a Smokehouse Brisket sandwich.

In September 2014, Arby's introduced gyros to its menu for a limited time. Gyros were previously offered in 2006. They have since become a permanent menu fixture on the menu in April 2016.

On an almost annual basis, Arby's had offered some sort of a flatbread melt sandwich for a limited time. In 2007 and again in 2008, it was the Philly Cheesesteak and the Fajita Beef. The Beef Fajita returned with the new Chicken Fajita in 2009. After a six-year hiatus, Steak Fajita Flatbreads were offered for a limited time in 2015. The following year, Steak Fajita returned in 2016 with Chicken Fajita along with a choice between a hot and mild sauce.

After a nine-year hiatus, a pork-beef mixture meatball sandwich was reintroduced in July 2016.

In August 2015, Arby's introduced a series of five small sandwiches called Sliders starting at $1.29, with prices varied by location. These new menu items led to an increase in sales at many locations. This is not the first time Arby's tried to market miniature sandwiches. Two years earlier, Arby's tried to sell a similar product called the Mighty Minis that were sold in pairs. During the first month of national sales, the firm was able to sell 1 million or a ton of sliders. To encourage additional sales outside normal lunch and dinner meal hours, began to offer sliders and small size drinks and sides at the reduced price of $1 between the hours of 2 and 5 p.m. starting in October 2015. Due to Arby's great success in the increase of sales created by the introduction of this new product line, Nation's Restaurant News awarded Arby's its MenuMasters Award for 2016. The Turkey 'n Cheese was initially offered as a limited time menu item in December 2016 but was shown to be popular enough to be retained on the regular menu. A Pizza Slider was introduced as a limited time menu item in May 2017.

In late August 2016, Arby's introduced four chicken sandwiches that used a buttermilk-based breaded breast filet.

Arby's debuted a new sandwich known as Smokehouse Pork Belly Sandwich in October 2016.

In October 2016, word leaked through social media that Arby's was about to test a venison sandwich, which Arby's confirmed, selecting 17 stores in Georgia, Michigan, Minnesota, Pennsylvania, Tennessee, and Wisconsin (all major deer hunting states) to offer it during a four-day test during those states' respective hunting seasons. Prior to the start of the promotion, USA Today published the locations of all 17 participating restaurants. Both due to curiosity and heavy demand from hunters, the sandwiches sold out in all markets on the first day of the test. Another USA Today article reported that the farm-raised venison was imported from New Zealand. In the following year, Arby's announced that the venison sandwich would return nationwide on October 21, 2017, also available in limited quantities.

In September 2017, Arby's introduced the Chicken Pepperoni Parm sandwich, their version of a chicken parmigiana sandwich which also contains pepperoni slices.

In October 2017, Arby's announced that three locations in Colorado, Montana, and Wyoming will offer an elk sandwich for a limited time. The farm-raised elk meat that was used to make the sandwiches was obtained from the same farm in New Zealand that provides the venison to Arby's since many states, such as Montana, prohibit the raising of game animals on commercial farms.

The following October, Arby's once again offered a featured wild game sandwich in 16 of its restaurants. This time, it would be a duck breast sandwich topped with a cherry sauce and crispy onions.

Some locations also serve breakfast, including at truck stop locations operated by Pilot Flying J and Love's Travel Stops and Country Stores that are typically operating 24 hours.

== Advertising ==
Since 2014, Ving Rhames has been the narrator of Arby's commercials. The chain's current slogan is "Arby's, We Have The Meats!"

== Global locations ==
Arby's currently has locations in Canada, Costa Rica, Saudi Arabia, Egypt, Mexico, South Korea, Turkey, and the United States (in every state except Rhode Island and Vermont). There are also Arby's locations for service members in the Kadena Air Base and Camp Foster in Okinawa, Japan.

== See also ==
- Rax Roast Beef
- Roy Rogers
