= Liautaud =

Liautaud is a surname. Notable people with the surname include:

- André Liautaud (1906–1951), Haitian diplomat and politician
- James P. Liautaud (1936–2015), American academic
- Jimmy John Liautaud (born 1964), American businessman and restaurateur
- Martine Liautaud, businesswoman
- Parker Liautaud (born 1994), American explorer and environmentalist
