= Jimmy John Liautaud =

American restaurateur (born 1964)

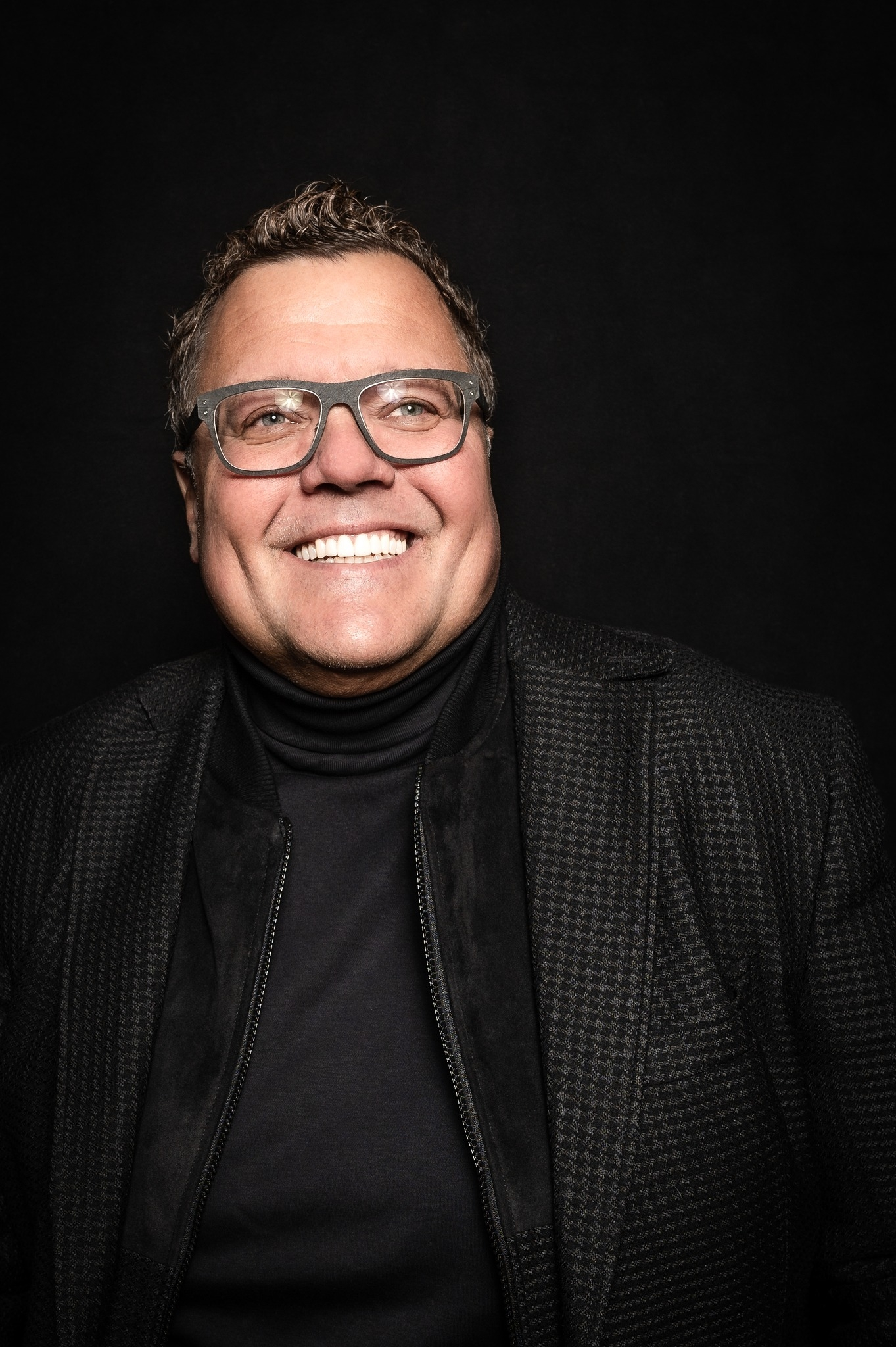
- Liautaud in 2024
- Born: January 12, 1964 (age 62); Arlington Heights, Illinois, U.S.
- Education: Eastern Illinois University
- Known for: Founder of Jimmy John's
- Spouse: Leslie Liautaud
- Children: 3
- Relatives: James P. Liautaud (Father)
- Website: Official Website Link Tree

James John Liautaud (born January 12, 1964) is an American restaurateur, who is widely known as the founder and former chairman of Jimmy John's sandwich chain.

In October 2018, Liautaud was included in the Forbes list of the world's wealthiest people. In 2026, Forbes estimated Liautaud's documented wealth at $2.6 billion.

== Family and early life ==
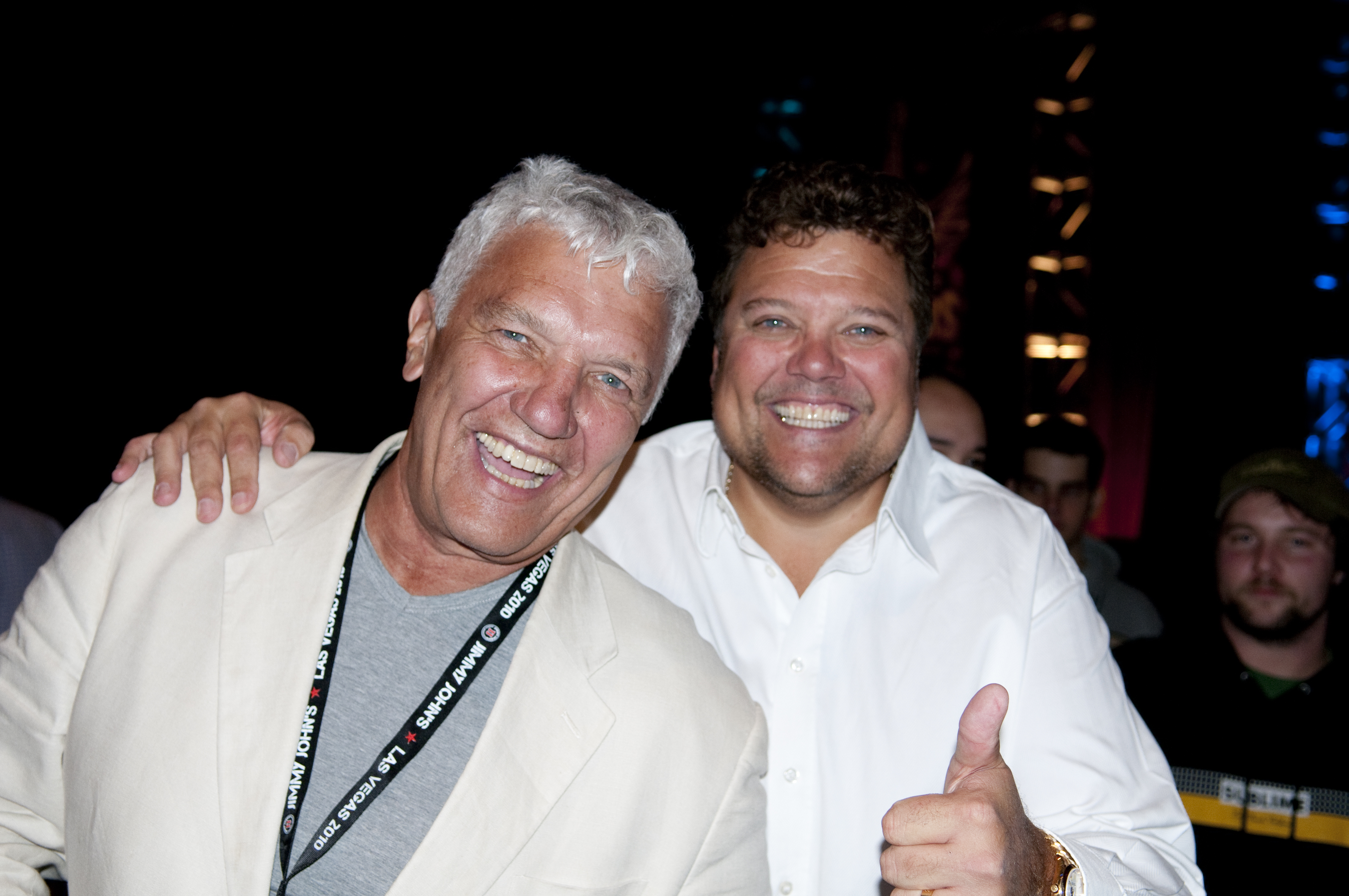
Jimmy John Liautaud with his father James P. Liautaud

Liautaud was born in Arlington Heights, Illinois, on January 12, 1964. His father is James Liautaud, long-term entrepreneur, and his mother is Gina Gudaityte Liautaud. He was born the second of four siblings, with brothers Greg and Robby Liautaud and a sister Lara Liautaud Berry. He attended high school at Elgin Academy, a private prep school in Elgin, Illinois, where he became close with and was influenced by the dean, James Lyons.

He studied at Eastern Illinois University but left after one semester to grow his up-and-coming restaurant business. According to Liautaud himself, he was informed midway through his second, incomplete semester that he had the second-lowest GPA in his class.

== Restaurant career ==
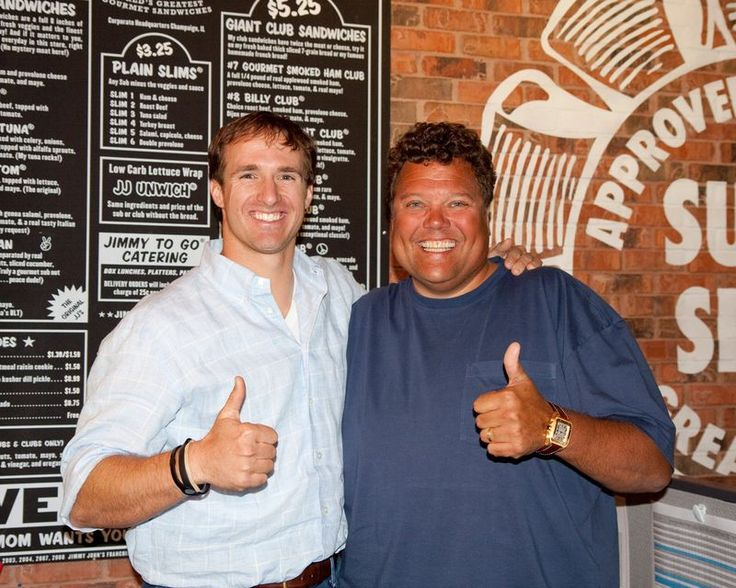
Jimmy John Liautaud and Jimmy John's franchise owner Drew Brees

After Liautaud graduated from high school in 1982, his father offered him a loan of $25,000 to open a business on the condition that if the business failed, he would enlist in the US Army. Although his father wanted him to enlist, he agreed to loan the money in exchange for a 48% stake in the business. Initially Jimmy John wanted to open a hot dog stand, but after visiting numerous such stands throughout the summer of 1982, he realized the $25,000 would not be enough for such a venture. After a chance encounter at a sandwich shop, Jimmy John realized that he could open a sandwich shop within his available budget by purchasing premium meats at a neighborhood market and baking his own bread. With the help of his family as tasters, he decided to put four sandwiches on his original menu. On January 13, 1983, Jimmy John's Gourmet Sandwiches opened in Charleston, Illinois. Due to the poor location of his first store, Liautaud decided to include delivery of his sandwiches to boost sales. He began by bringing samples door-to-door to the nearby Eastern Illinois University dorms. By the end of his first year, the restaurant started making a profit. At the end of his second year, Liautaud was able to purchase his father's share in the business and he became sole owner. The business continued to grow, and he was able to open his second and third shops in 1986 and 1987.

In 1988, Liautaud met businessman Jamie Coulter. At the time, Coulter was a Pizza Hut Franchisee, and later founded and ran Lone Star Steakhouse and Saloon and other chains. Coulter helped Liautaud take his business to the next level. In 1994 he sold his first Jimmy John's franchise, in addition to the 10 stores owned by Liautaud himself.

By 2002, the company had about 200 stores, 10% of which were corporate stores that Liautaud oversaw himself. Sales at the stores managed by Liautaud were outpacing the franchised stores by a wide margin. Together with his partner, and also the company's president and CEO, James North, he visited 70 of the poorest-performing stores. After 18 months of getting the stores "back to basics" and instilling in them "some of that initial spark", he was able to help the stores become more profitable.

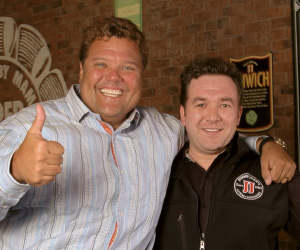
Jimmy John Liautaud with Jimmy John's president James North

In January 2007, Liautaud selected Weston Presidio, a private-equity firm, to help acquire better locations for the expanding company. Weston Presidio bought a 33% stake in the company, and during the first year closed on over 100 real estate deals.

In September 2016, Roark Capital Group agreed to purchase a majority stake in Liautaud's company, as Weston Presidio sold their minority investment after 10 years. Terms of the transaction were not immediately disclosed, though it was later clarified that Liautaud retained 35% ownership of the company as part of the deal. As part of the agreement, Liautaud, as the company's founder and largest individual shareholder, continued as chairman of the board.

In his 2018 book, Dick Portillo of Portillo's Restaurants called Liautaud his "good friend" and relayed that Liautaud tried to buy Portillo's before it was ultimately sold to Berkshire Partners.

In September 2019, Roark's Inspire Brands announced it was acquiring Jimmy John's for an unspecified amount in a deal unanimously approved by Liautaud and the rest of the Jimmy John's board of directors. At the close of the deal, Liautaud said that he will step down as chairman of the company and transition to become an advisor to the brand. The acquisition was completed on October 18.

== Philanthropy ==
In 2008, Liautaud donated $1 million to his high school, Elgin Academy, on the condition that the building constructed using his donation bear not only his name but also the name of the man who had been the dean of the school when Liautaud attended: James Lyons.

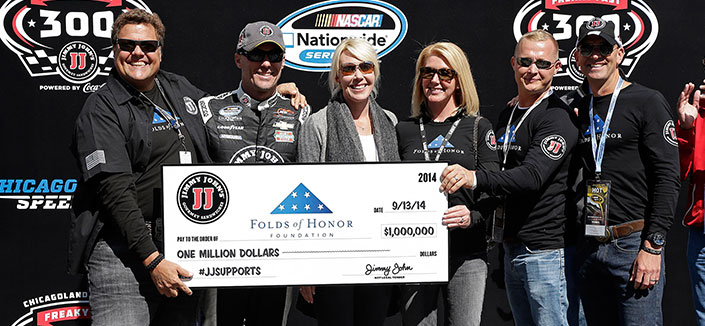
Jimmy John Liautaud donating $1 million to Major Dan Rooney and Folds of Honor

In 2011, Liautaud and his wife pledged $1 million toward the construction of the new Champaign County YMCA.

In July 2014, Liautaud donated $1 million to the Folds of Honor Foundation, an organization that supports the spouses and children of America's fallen and disabled service-members.

In 2017, Liautaud and his wife, Leslie, donated $2 million to help Brewster Academy kick off the fundraising for their new residence hall to house 22 students and 4 faculty residences. In May 2018, the new residence opened, and is called "Toad Hall" after a common mispronunciation of the family's last name.

In January 2019, Camp Southern Ground, a non-profit summer camp founded by musician Zac Brown, announced that the Liautauds had donated over $3.2 million to date to help build the camp's first residential lodge and fund ongoing operations. In non-summer months, the camp's facilities are used to support military veterans and their families transitioning back to civilian life.

The Liautaud Family Foundation directed $1.291 million to the Horatio Alger Association to support scholarships for underprivileged students in 2019.

Liautaud partnered with his father to create with an endowment gift of $5 million, the Liautaud Graduate School of Business at the University of Illinois-Chicago.

The Liautauds donated $1 million to Chicago's Youth Guidance Becoming a Man program, which helps disadvantaged young men learn how to handle tough life challenges and give them the tools to succeed in the future.

Other causes supported by the Liautauds include: the Frances Nelson Smile Healthy Dental Clinic, the Kickapoo Rail Trail, Crisis Nursery in Urbana, Illinois, Champaign County's Youth Assessment Center, Champaign Unit 4 schools, Christmas layaway purchases, the American Heart Association, the Mayo Clinic Center for Individualized Medicine, MD Anderson, the Pancreatic Cancer Action Network, the Lurie Children's Hospital of Chicago, the Goodman Theater, and the Detroit Symphony.

== Political positions ==
=== Political donations ===
Together with his spouse, Liautaud contributed $212,000 to Donald Trump's 2020 presidential campaign. In total they have donated $3.1 million to Donald Trump's campaign and inauguration. Liautaud has been a vocal supporter of President Trump and his allies, and has contributed to the legal defense fund of Rudy Giuliani in the wake of the January 6th attack.

=== Coronavirus response ===
On April 14, 2020, President Donald Trump announced the formation of Great American Economic Revival Industry Groups, which Liautaud served with more than 200 other business leaders. The groups aimed to "chart the path forward toward a future of unparalleled American prosperity...and these groups will produce a more independent, self-sufficient, and resilient Nation" in the face of the COVID-19 pandemic. Liataud joined with other fast food executives from McDonald's, Subway, Papa John's, and Chick-fil-A, among others.

Liautaud highlighted the need for private enterprise and free markets, rather than government intervention to stimulate the economy "the free-market system will be 10 times faster and exponentially more efficient than any stimulus or government-run program", and advocated for relaxing labor laws and rent relief for business owners.

== Honors ==
Liautaud is a member of the University of Illinois at Chicago's Chicago Area Entrepreneurship Hall of Fame.

In 2003, he was named to Chicago's "40 Under 40" by Crain's Chicago Business.

In 2004, he was named the Ernst & Young Food & Beverage Entrepreneur of the Year in Illinois. The winners were selected by an independent panel of judges composed of local community and business leaders. In the same year, he was given the Lifetime Achievement Award at the National CEO Conference and inducted into the Collegiate Entrepreneurs' Organization Hall of Fame.

In 2007, Liautaud delivered the commencement speech at his alma mater, now known as the Liautaud-Lyons Upper School, a program of Elgin Academy.

In 2012, Liautaud was awarded the Nation's Restaurant News Golden Chain award for outstanding accomplishments that have benefited consumers in the food industry.

In March 2017, he was named Franchise Times' "Dealmaker of the Year" for the deal that brought Roark Capital Group in as the company's new majority owner. Beth Ewen, FT's editor-in-chief called the deal "one of the best private equity deals of all time in the restaurant business". In December of that year, Liautaud was received the Horatio Alger Award for 2018. The Horatio Alger Association of Distinguished Americans recognizes people who have overcome personal challenges to achieve personal and professional success.

== Public speaking ==
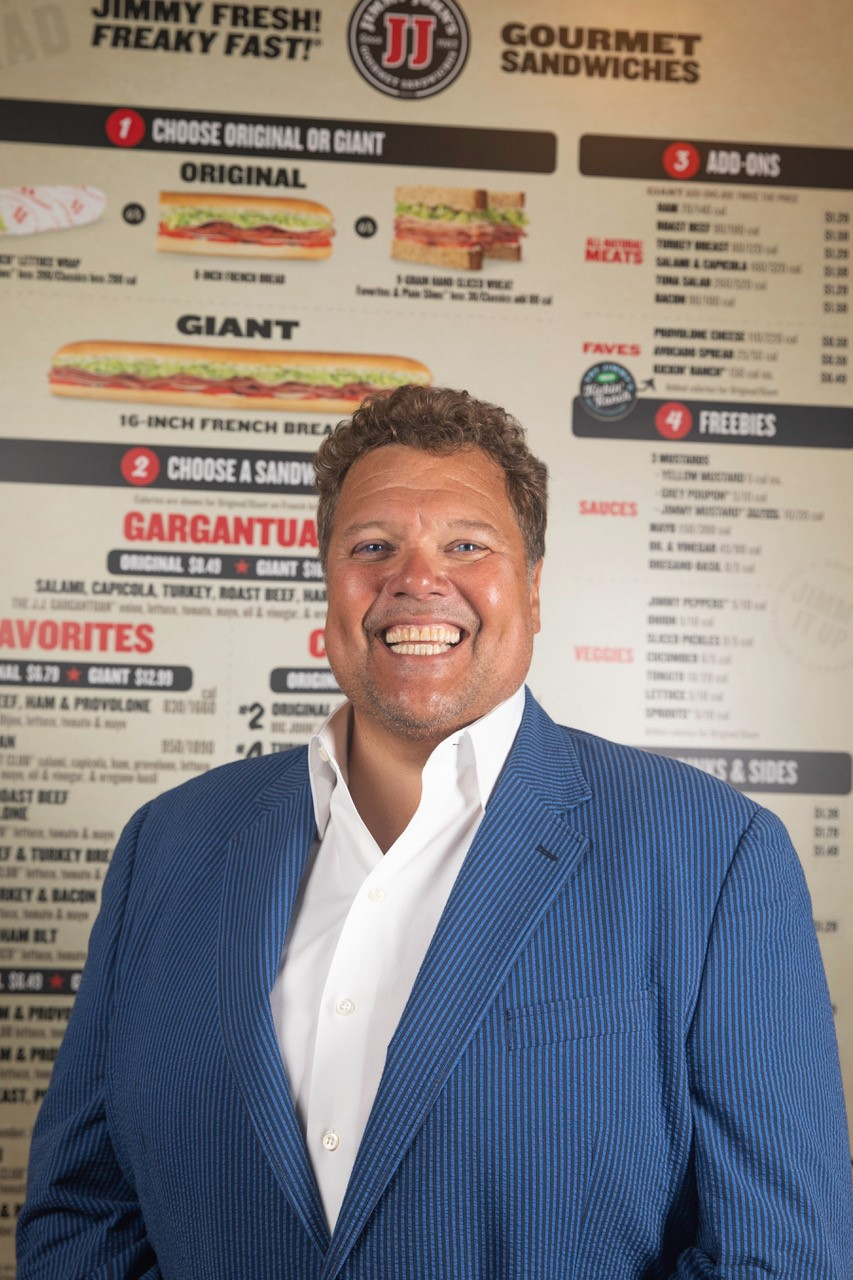
Liautaud in 2018

Liautaud has spoken at high schools; colleges and universities; and community spaces.

== Personal life ==
Liautaud is married to Leslie Liautaud and has three children. Liautaud is an investor in wines and vineyards, at least one of which has been featured on the cover of Wine Spectator. He also owns thousands of acres of farmland in Central Illinois.

Liautaud previously owned a superyacht named ROCK.IT, a 198-foot ship built with his input by Feadship in 2014. The ship, which can accommodate ten guests with a crew of 13, has been a finalist for a few yacht awards and has been featured in industry publications. Liautaud sold the yacht in June 2023.

Liautaud is an avid hunter and fisherman. In an interview in 2015 with the Chicago Tribune, Liautaud said that the largest misconception about him is that people still connect him to photos of him posing with big game from 10 years ago. According to Liautaud, he used to hunt big game in Africa on legally organized safaris, but he no longer does. Starting in 2015, his hunting prompted people to call for a boycott of his business.
