= Evenflo =

Infant and juvenile products company

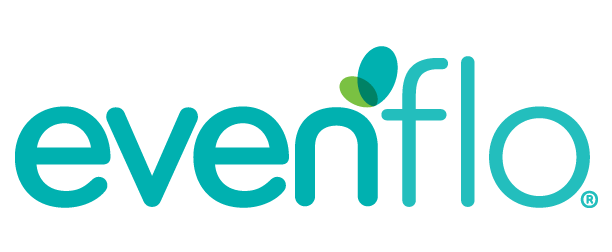
- Industry: Consumer Products
- Founded: 1920
- Headquarters: Evenflo Feeding, Inc.: West Chester, Ohio; Evenflo Company, Inc.: Boston, Massachusetts, U.S.
- Products: breast pumps, baby bottles, pacifiers, sippy cups, car seats, strollers, booster seats, stroller wagons, travel systems, safety gates, high chairs, play yards, stationary activity centers, infant carriers, doorway jumpers
- Owners: Kimberly-Clark de México: Evenflo Feeding Inc., Goodbaby International Holdings Limited: Evenflo Company, Inc.
- Divisions: Evenflo Feeding, Inc. (Feeding), Evenflo Company, Inc. (Juvenile Travel & Home Safety)
- Website: www.evenflo.com, www.evenflofeeding.com

Headquartered in Boston, Massachusetts, Evenflo Company, Inc. operates the juvenile travel and home safety businesses with products that include car seats, travel systems, safety gates, high chairs, play yards, stationary activity centers, infant carriers and doorway jumpers. Evenflo Company Inc. has two manufacturing facilities: one in Piqua, Ohio, and one in Tijuana, Mexico.

Evenflo is a 100 year old infant feeding brand. Evenflo Feeding, Inc. is headquartered in West Chester, Ohio and has had a presence in Ohio since being founded in 1920 as the Pyramid Rubber Company. Evenflo Feeding manufactures breast pumps, baby bottles, pacifiers and sippy cups.

== History ==
The Evenflo brand traces its roots back to the 1920 founding of the Pyramid Rubber Company in Ravenna, Ohio. Initially, the company was a manufacturer of products related to baby feeding. In 1995, Evenflo Company, Inc. was created through the merger of Evenflo Juvenile Products and Evenflo Juvenile Furniture Company (formerly known as Questor Juvenile Furniture Company).

The company was acquired by private equity firm Kohlberg Kravis Roberts & Co., together with Spalding in 1996 and again in 1997 by Gerry Baby Products Company, a division of Huffy Corporation. In 2004, Harvest Partners another private equity firm, acquired the company. Harvest sold Evenflo to Weston Presidio in 2007.

In January 2012, Evenflo Company Inc. sold their feeding business to Kimberly-Clark de México, a personal and family care products company in Mexico. From then on, Evenflo-branded products began to be marketed under the names “Evenflo Baby”, and “Evenflo Feeding” respectively. Nearly a year later, in November 2012, Evenflo Company, Inc. sold their Ameda® breastfeeding business to Platinum Products Holding, Inc. (a portfolio company of Crimson Investment).

Evenflo Company, Inc. was officially acquired by Goodbaby International Holdings Limited in July 2014. Goodbaby International is a durable juvenile products company that is listed on the Main Board of the Hong Kong Stock Exchange (1086:HK). The Group designs, researches and develops, manufactures, markets and sells strollers, children's car seats, cribs, bicycles and tricycles and other durable juvenile products.

Over the years, Evenflo has received industry recognition for its products and designs including several Juvenile Products Manufacturers Association (JPMA) Innovation Awards in categories such as Child Restraint Systems, Design/Fashion, Strollers, and Best in Show. Evenflo’s products are also winners among parents. Consumer-driven awards include the Best Innovative Car Seat and Stroller Combo in the Parents’ Best For Baby Awards in the Best for On the Go category plus National Parenting Product Awards (NAPPA) for their car seats, travel systems, strollers, and stroller wagon.

== Products ==
Evenflo's core products include breast pumps, baby bottles, pacifiers, sippy cups, car seats, strollers, travel systems, stroller wagons, baby gates, portable play yards, stationary activity centers, bassinets, baby swings and rockers, high chairs, and home baby proofing essentials.

=== Technology ===
In 2015, Evenflo introduced a car seat featuring SensorSafe, a safety monitoring system consisting of a sensor integrated into the chest clip and a wireless receiver connected to a vehicle through its onboard diagnostics (OBD-II) port. The system was designed to alert drivers if the chest clip became unfastened while the vehicle was in motion and to provide a reminder that a child remained in the backseat at the end of a journey to reduce child vehicular heat stroke deaths.

An updated version, SensorSafe 2.0, was introduced in 2019. The new system replaced the OBD-II receiver with Bluetooth connectivity and required use of the SensorSafe mobile app. Additional monitoring capabilities were added, enabling the system to send real-time alerts related to an unfastened chest clip, a child left unattended in a vehicle, unsafe ambient temperatures, and extended periods in the car seat.

In 2025, Evenflo introduced a first-to-market technology SensorySoothe™, designed to bring calming comfort to both babies and parents by integrating soothing lights and sounds into the car seat handle. The Evenflo Revolve180™ LiteMax™ NXT featuring SensorySoothe™ Technology was named to Time's Best Inventions of 2025 list in the Parenting category. The SensorySoothe™ technology was also named Best Car Seat Innovation in the Parents 2025 Best for Baby Awards.

In 2026, Evenflo introduced its Home Collection line, which integrates the same SensorySoothe Technology while emphasizing both functionality and aesthetic design.

== Booster seat controversy ==
A 2020 article by ProPublica asserted that Evenflo sold booster seats recommended for child weights lower than suggested by the company's engineers, who reportedly recommended that the company stop selling booster seats for children who weighed less than 40 pounds. The article also asserted that company advertising that those booster seats were "SIDE IMPACT TESTED" was misleading because there was no government standard for side-impacting testing and the company’s internal testing did not adequately support that the seats eliminated risk in the event of a crash.
