= Cybex =

Manufacturer of child safety products

Cybex is a manufacturer of child safety products (child car seats, strollers, baby carriers). The company was founded in 2005 by Martin Pos in Kulmbach, Germany. It has been owned by the Chinese child safety manufacturer Goodbaby International since 2014. Cybex has locations in Hong Kong, Kulmbach, and Bayreuth and Prague. and sells its products internationally. In 2010 the company had over 100 employees and a profit of 37 million Euros. In 2019 the number of employees rose to 500.

== Products ==
The company manufactures products and systems for transporting babies and children up to the age of 12:

- Child car seats and baby seats
- Strollers

In 2021, Cybex collaborated with DJ Khaled for the We The Best x Cybex Stroller collection.

Their products have been listed on many lists for best baby gear.
