= Kirk McKinney Jr. =

American entrepreneur

- Born: Westwood, Massachusetts, U.S.
- Education: Babson College
- Occupation: Entrepreneur
- Known for: Co-founder and CEO of Junk Teens

Kirk McKinney (born 2003) is an American entrepreneur who is the co-founder and director of Junk Teens, a junk removal company based in Norwood, Massachusetts, that he started with his younger brother, Jacob McKinney, in 2021 while both were teenagers.

== Early life and education ==
McKinney is from Westwood, Massachusetts. He has said the idea for his business began after he found a working pair of speakers while visiting a local dump as a teenager, which led him to begin collecting and reselling discarded items on Facebook Marketplace. He went on to study entrepreneurship at Babson College in Wellesley, Massachusetts, graduating in 2026.

== Career ==
In February 2021, McKinney founded Junk Teens in Norwood, Massachusetts, together with his younger brother Jacob, then a high school freshman. The brothers began by purchasing a used pickup truck for about $4,000 to haul items, and the business grew out of removing unwanted household goods and reselling or donating usable items rather than discarding them.

In 2023, the company had signed a lease on a warehouse and begun a partnership with the restaurant chain Dave's Hot Chicken as it expanded its operations around Westwood and Norwood. In 2025, McKinney has overseen the company's growth into a multi-location operation; according to CNBC, which reviewed financial documents provided by the company, Junk Teens generated approximately $3.04 million in revenue across roughly 5,500 jobs, operating five dump trucks from two locations in eastern Massachusetts covering the Boston and Cape Cod areas.

In 2026, the company stated that it aimed to generate $5 million in revenue and expand beyond Massachusetts.

Junk Teens has also partnered with local charitable organizations, including Computers 4 People and Fabulous Finds, to redistribute usable items collected during jobs.

== Recognition ==
McKinney and his brother were named to BostInno's "25 Under 25" list, an annual recognition of young entrepreneurs and professionals in the Boston area. Their business has also been covered by Entrepreneur magazine on multiple occasions as it grew from a six-figure side hustle to a multimillion-dollar company.

== Personal life ==
McKinney operates Junk Teens together with his brother, Jacob McKinney, who serves as co-founder.
