= EI Leadership Institute =

- Formation: 2006
- Founder: James P. Liautaud (Co-founder)
- Dissolved: c. 2021
- Legal status: Institute
- Purpose: Promote executive education program based on process-designed team (PDT) principles
- Location: Chicago, Illinois, United States
- Services: Executive training
- Website: www.liautaudinstitute.com
- Formerly called: Liautaud Institute

The EI Leadership Institute, formerly known as the Liautaud Institute, was a positive change leadership institute cofounded by investor and business theorist James P. Liautaud. The Institute developed training processes to improve group performance and cohesion. It appeared to operate from 2006 until around 2021, when its web site was closed.

The Institute was listed as one of the leading executive education programs by Chief Executive Magazine in 2013. It was also ranked as one of the top five programs for Organizational Development by HR.com's Leadership Excellence And Development (LEAD) in 2016.

== History ==
Jim Liautaud co-founded the Institute in 2006. Working with neuroscientists, psychologists, CEOs and researchers, Liautaud and his colleagues created a training program to quickly build successful intra-company teams. In 2006, the Institute started to catalog the best social habits from high-performing managers. They broke down each practice into a sequence of steps and standardized them so that they could be certified, similar to the way the International Organization for Standardization (ISO) certifies the quality of goods and services.

== Approach ==
The EI Leadership Institute used an approach called PDT (process-designed teams), applying the principles of Nobel Prize-winning economist Dr. Elinor Ostrom. Their leadership forum program had shown a 23% increase in Emotional intelligence for participating executives over a two-year period.

== Recognition ==
The Institute was ranked as one of the top five programs for Organizational Development by HR.com's Leadership Excellence And Development (LEAD) in 2016. Their work has been covered by Time (2014), Inc. (2015), HR.com (2016), The International Leadership Association (2016), Forbes (2017), and in the book Research on Emotions in Organizations (2016).
