= James P. Liautaud =

Father of Jimmy John's founder Jimmy John Liautaud

Jim Liautaud
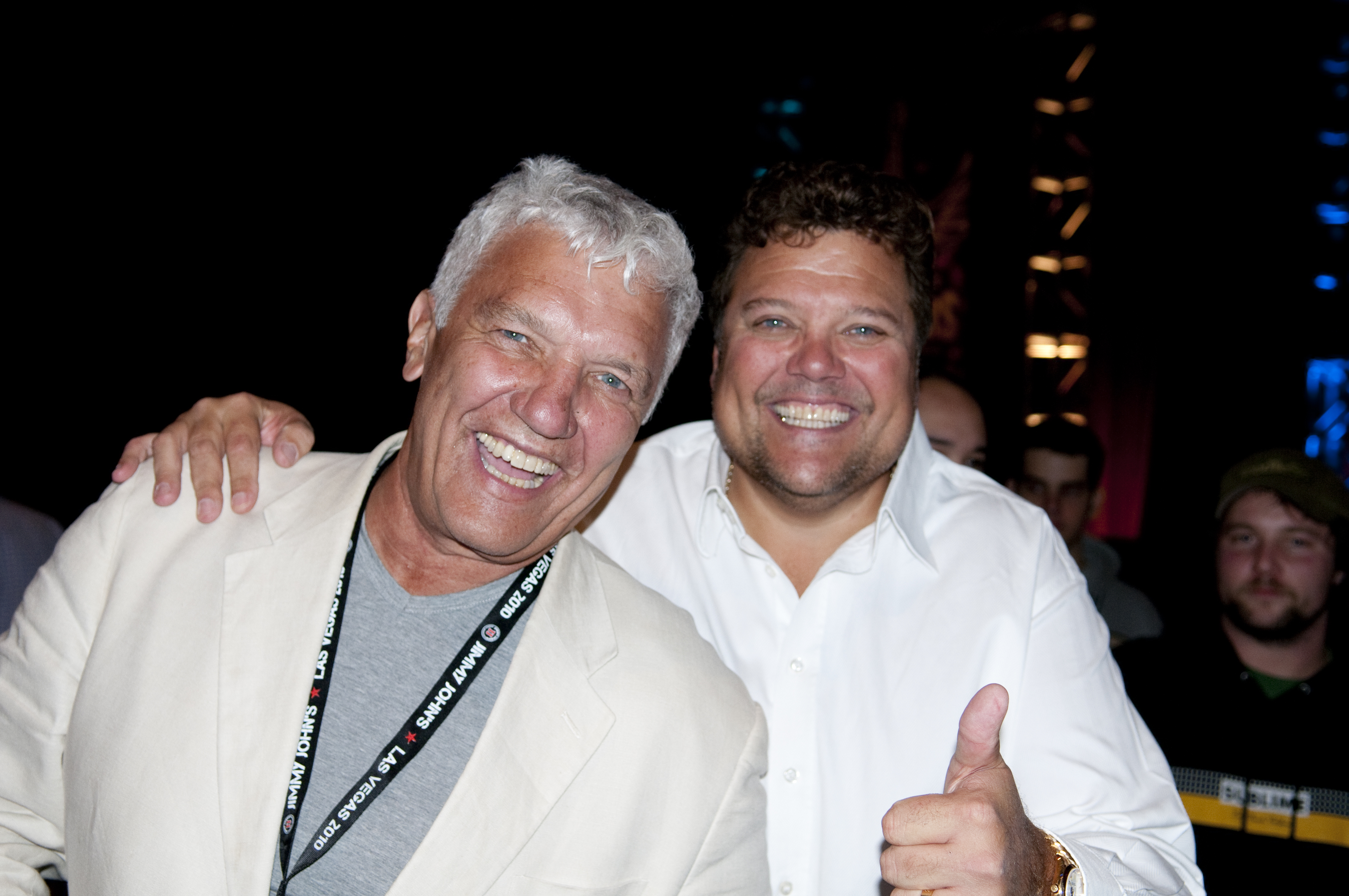
- Liautaud with his son, Jimmy John Liautaud.
- Born: October 19, 1936; Chicago, Illinois, U.S.
- Died: October 23, 2015 (aged 79); Wascott, Wisconsin, U.S.
- Education: University of Illinois at Urbana–Champaign (BS); The Chicago School of Professional Psychology (PhD)
- Website: www.liautaudinstitute.com

James P. Liautaud (October 19, 1936 – October 23, 2015) was an American industrialist, inventor and business theorist. He is the father of Jimmy John's founder Jimmy John Liautaud. Liautaud provided his son with the seed money to start his restaurant business in 1983.

== Early life and education ==
Liautaud grew up in Chicago and served in the United States Army in Korea. He earned a Bachelor of Science degree in mechanical engineering from the University of Illinois at Urbana–Champaign in 1963.

== Career ==
=== Business ===
He began his business career as a door-to-door salesman selling books for the Grolier Encyclopedia company. He founded a company while still in college; negotiating with Time Life to sell their magazines on campus, and ended up hiring 150 salespeople.

During the late 1960s Liautaud became a pioneer of a new technology called composite molding. He became the president and co-owner of the Capsonic Group in 1968, which manufactured plastics and electronics in Elgin, Illinois. He launched other companies in Elgin over the years, including American Antenna Company, which made the equipment for the citizens' band radio industry, and K40 Electronics, which built a radar detector designed to allow drivers to detect when their speed was being monitored by police.

With the money that Liautaud gave his son to start his own business, James John Liautaud (Jimmy John) was able to begin Jimmy John's sandwich stores. He is the founder of Gabriel, Inc. He also was the founding Investor in two insurance companies, Raffles and National Interstate; and Blue Rhino, a gas distribution company. The latter two are now public companies. In all, Liautaud started and ran five companies before reaching his mid-50s.

When he reached age 55, Liautaud had an “epiphany,” and took a two-year sabbatical after selling off his companies. He toured the US by motorcycle, read books on history, psychology and sociology. By the end of that break, he decided what his next step was, to become an academic to research the impact that psychology and social interactions have on the success of chief executives.

=== Inventing ===
In 1970 he received a patent for a molding process that he developed for General Instruments. In 1974, he invented and manufactured the coin counter, which was used on all Western Electric single-coin pay phones. He was one of the early pioneers of ISO processes used in manufacturing the first air-bag sensors. During this time period Liautaud received between 60 and 80 U.S. patents as well as many design awards.

=== Academic career ===
After Liautaud sold his businesses, and after a two-year hiatus, he joined the faculty of the University of Illinois at Chicago. He created and funded the Liautaud Graduate School of Business at the University of Illinois-Chicago. He developed a training methodology called PdEI, which helps chief executives implement the principles of positive psychology in the work place.

=== Organizations ===
He launched several organizations, including the Liautaud Institute, now known as the EI Leadership Institute. He founded two organizations serving CEO's; Young President Organizations (YPO) WindyCity Chapter and the Chicago Family Business Council.

=== The EI Leadership Institute ===
The EI Leadership Institute, (founded as the Liautaud Institute) was funded by Liautaud as a "use-inspired" research institute dedicated to researching and engineering proven solutions, leveraging people's biogenetic needs to create a happier, more effective workforce. At the Institute he engineered processes and proven learnable habits that are steeped in effective research, and use a methodical approach inspired from manufacturing practices (ISO) to create consistent, repeatable and viral change. The EI Leadership Institute has been ranked as one of the top 40 Executive Education classes along with Northwestern, MIT, Columbia, and others.

== Recreation ==
Liautaud participated in the creation of the Cannonball Run car race. In 1986, what had previously been an informal 400-mile race of high-performance cars became the legal Cannonball Run.

== Personal life ==
While attending the University of Illinois, Liautaud met his wife, Gina Liautaud, to whom he was married for 54 years. Liautaud had four children, Greg, Jimmy John, Robby and Lara. Liautaud is also the uncle of "Big" Mike Liautaud, of Milio's Sandwiches fame

Liautaud died of pancreatic cancer on October 23, 2015, at the age of 79, at the family cabin in Wascott, Wisconsin.

In 2019, Liautaud's wife Gina donated three $10,000 scholarships in his memory. These scholarships were awarded to students of Lithuanian descent enrolled in a recognized business program at a university within the State of Illinois.
