= Fastsigns =

American sign shop chain

Fastsigns International, Inc
- The Fastsigns logo

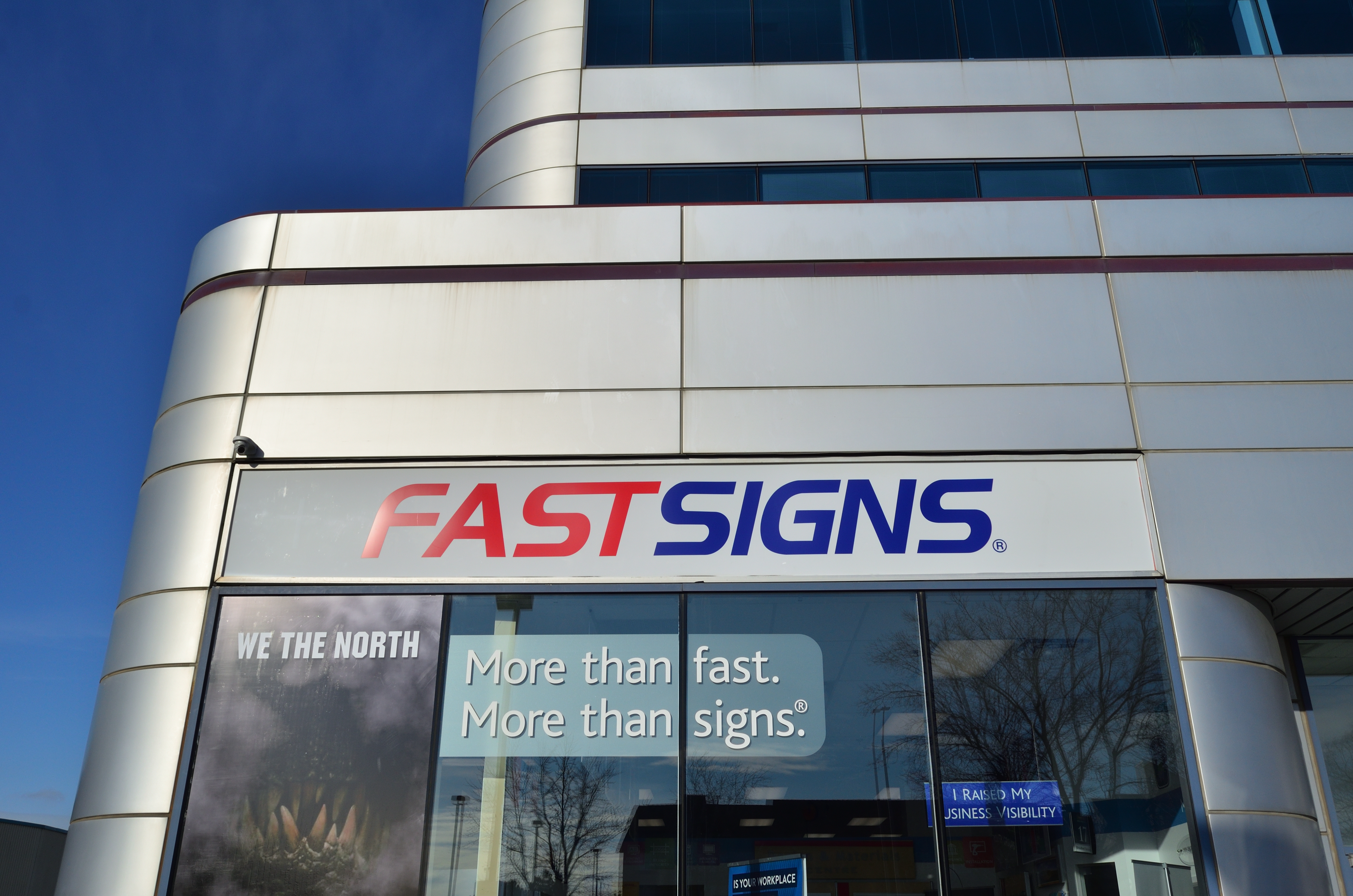
- Fastsigns in Markham, Ontario
- Company type: Private
- Industry: Signage
- Founded: 1985; 41 years ago
- Headquarters: Carrollton, Texas, U.S.
- Number of locations: 700
- Area served: United States; Canada; United Kingdom; Mexico; Australia; Cayman Islands; Saudi Arabia; UAE
- Products: Signs, graphics, decals, displays, and visual communications
- Owner: Levine Leichtman Capital Partners
- Website: fastsigns.com

Fastsigns International Inc. (stylized as FASTSIGNS) is the franchisor of Fastsigns centers which provide custom sign and graphics products.

There are currently over 780 Fastsigns locations worldwide in United States, Canada, the U.K., the Cayman Islands, Mexico, Saudi Arabia, the UAE, Chile and Australia (where centers operate under the name Signwave). Countries where the company formerly had locations but no longer operates include Brazil (from which it withdrew in 1996) and Argentina.

Fastsigns was founded in Austin in 1985 by Gary Salomon and Bob Schanbaum. The first franchise was sold in December 1986, with its first international franchise sold in 1991. The company was bought in October 2003 by Roark Capital Group, an Atlanta-based private equity firm. In 2009, former president of PIP Printing, Catherine Monson, was named CEO of Fastsigns. In July 2014, Fastsigns was acquired by Levine Leichtman Capital Partners, a Beverly Hills-based investment firm.

The creation and growth of Fastsigns was profiled in a case study in the textbook Managing: A Competency-Based Approach.
