= Wingstop =

American restaurant company

Wingstop Inc.

- A Wingstop location in Tulsa, Oklahoma
- Type: Public
- Traded as: Nasdaq: WING; S&P 400 component
- Industry: Restaurants
- Genre: Fast casual fast food restaurant
- Founded: 1994; 32 years ago Garland, Texas, U.S.
- Founders: Antonio Swad; Bernadette Fiaschetti
- Headquarters: Dallas, Texas, U.S.
- Number of locations: 3000+ as of 2026
- Area served: Australia; Canada; Colombia; France; Indonesia; Ireland; Italy; Thailand; Kuwait; Mexico; Netherlands; Panama; Philippines; Saudi Arabia; Singapore; South Korea; United Arab Emirates; United Kingdom; United States; Puerto Rico
- Key people: Michael J. Skipworth (CEO)
- Products: Chicken wings, chicken tenders, french fries, soft drinks
- Revenue: ▲US$625.8 million (FY 2024)
- Operating income: ▲US$165.6 million (FY 2024)
- Net income: ▲US$108.7 million (FY 2024)
- Total assets: ▲US$716.2 million (FY 2024)
- Number of employees: 1,335 (December 2024)
- Website: wingstop.com

Wingstop Inc. is an American international fast food chain that primarily sells Buffalo wings.

The restaurant chain was founded in 1994 in Garland, Texas, and began offering franchises in 1997. As of 2026, Wingstop had over 3,000 restaurants around the world. The chain is headquartered in Dallas, Texas. In 2003, the chain was acquired by Gemini Investors, which sold it to Roark Capital Group in 2010. Wingstop went public in 2015.

== History ==
Wingstop was founded in 1994 in Garland, Texas by Antonio Swad and Bernadette Fiaschetti. The first franchised location opened in 1997, and by 2002, the brand claimed to have served two million wings. In 2005, Wingstop began serving lunch, and in 2009 it began selling boneless products.

Between 2014 and 2016, Wingstop was the third-fastest-growing restaurant chain in the US as measured by both system-wide sales and unit growth, according to Nation's Restaurant News. In 2015, Wingstop went public at an initial public offering price of $19 per share. That year, their profits more than doubled.

In 2019, Wingstop began using the tagline Where Flavor Gets Its Wings. The next year, Wingstop became available for delivery in Dallas, Texas through DoorDash As of 2019, the Wingstop Team Member Foundation acted as an employee-funded nonprofit that gave money to other employees experiencing financial hardship due to an emergency.

On June 21, 2021, WingStop announced a digital-only restaurant called ThighStop, which sells chicken thighs instead of wings. The company cited cost-saving measures as the reason for the change.

== International operations ==
Wingstop opened its first international restaurant in Mexico in 2010.

In April 2013, Wingstop announced that they are opening the first store in Southeast Asia, starting in Singapore. In February 2014, Wingstop announced the opening of stores in the Philippines. The first Philippine store opened in June 2014. In the same month, plans were announced for Wingstop to open in Indonesia with 100 stores by 2021.

Franchises began opening in London, UK in 2018 and have now grown to 20 locations in the Greater London area. Originally introduced to England by Lemon Pepper Holdings, the majority stakeholder in the franchise is now Sixth Street Partners - the same investment firm that owns the Far West Services franchises on the US West Coast.

In 2021, Wingstop made an agreement with JPK Capital to develop 100 Wingstop locations in Canada. The first restaurant in Canada opened in June 2022.

In May 2022, Wingstop announced plans to enter South Korea.

As of November 26, 2025, Wingstop operates in 15 countries internationally. Recent expansions include Australia, Bahrain, Kuwait, Puerto Rico, Saudi Arabia, and the Netherlands. On this same day, Wingstop reiterated its intentions to expand into Thailand, Italy and Ireland.

The first Wingstop in Australia opened on May 17, 2025. The first Dutch outlet opened on August 8 2025, at Amsterdam Airport Schiphol. The first Irish outlet on December 8, 2025 at Dublin's Liffey Valley shopping centre. On December 13, 2025, Wingstop entered the Thailand market, in MBK Center.

== Products ==
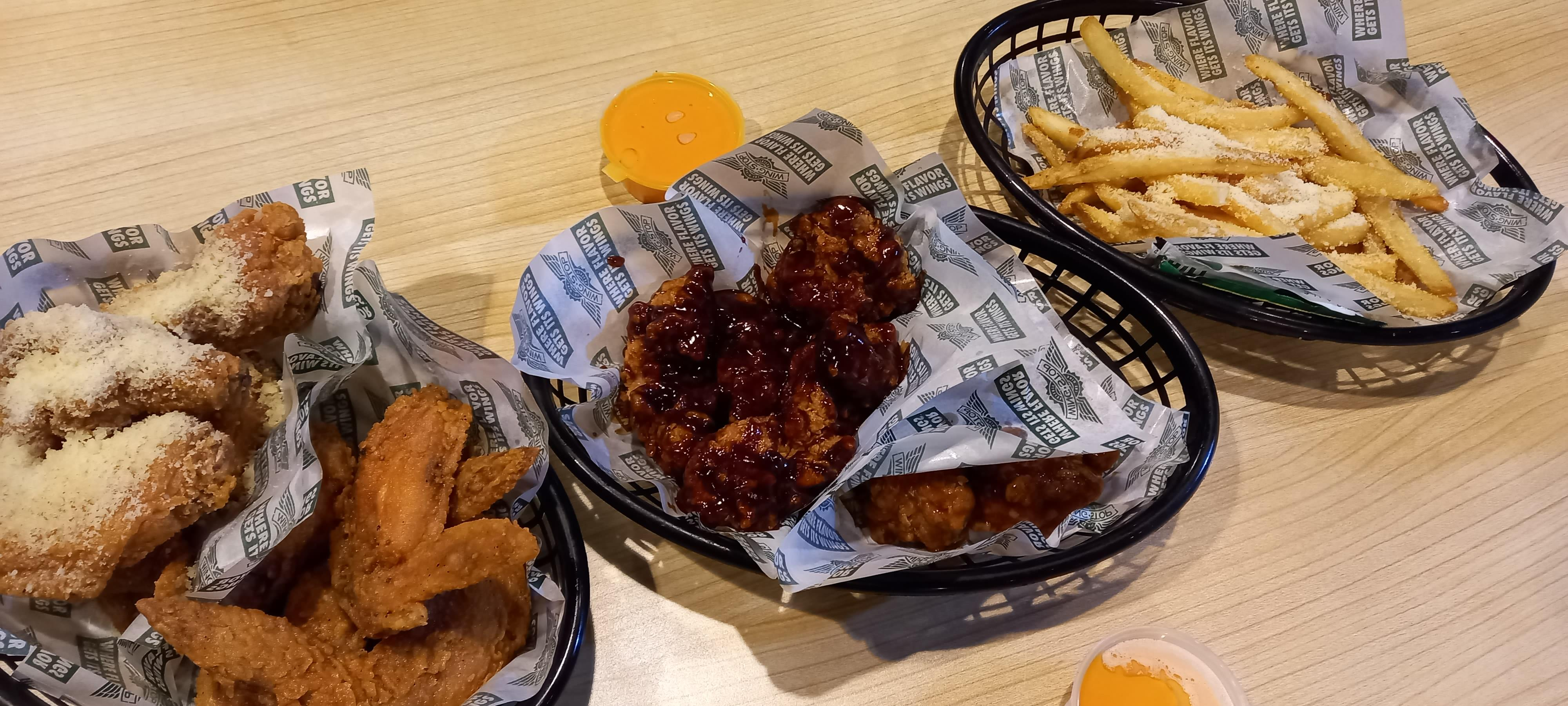
Wings and fries from Wingstop

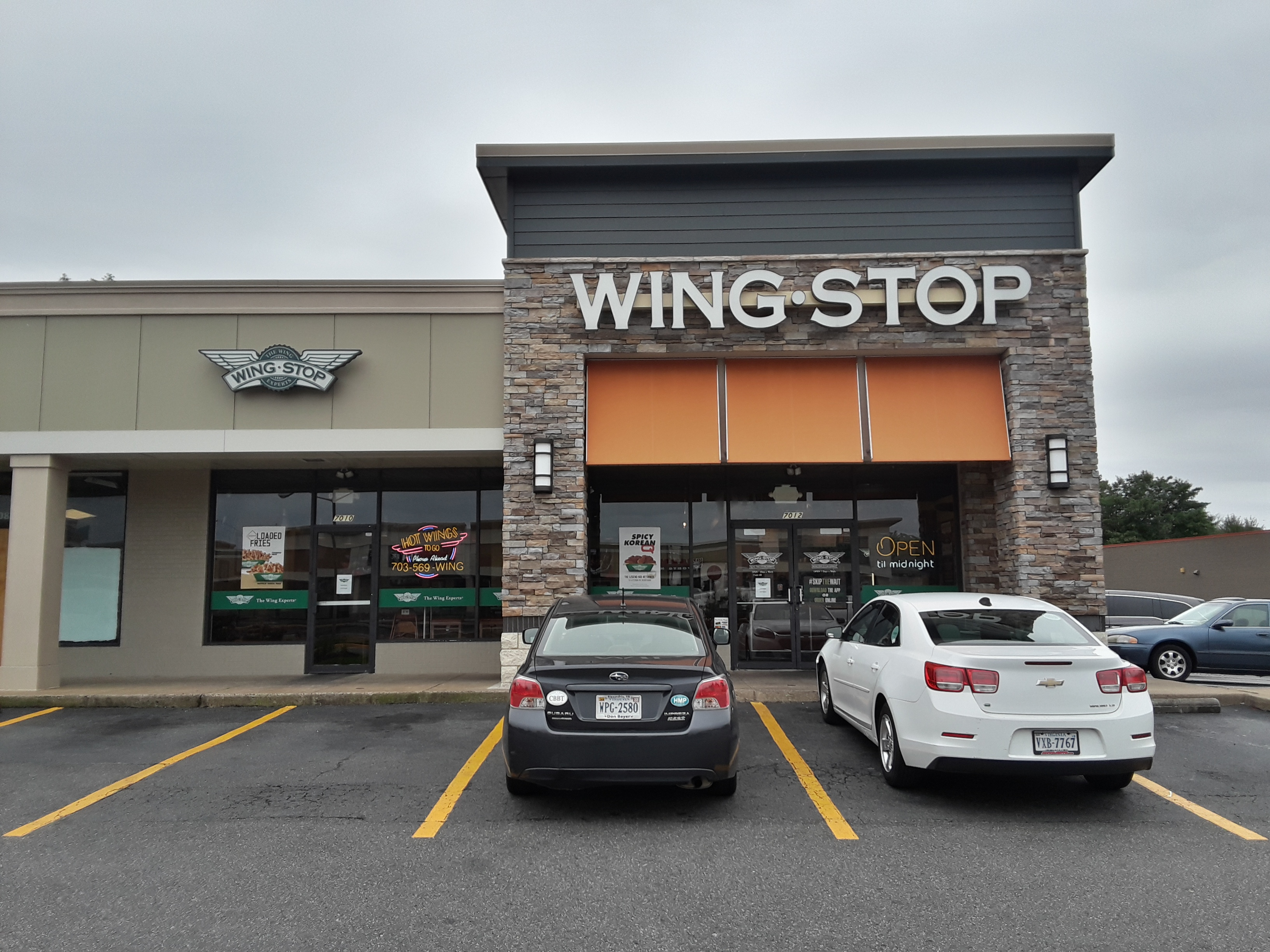
A Wingstop in Springfield, Virginia

Wingstop's menu includes a wide range of chicken products such as bone-in and boneless wings, chicken tenders, and fried chicken sandwiches.

There are 13 wing sauces, with some sauces available for limited periods as part of marketing efforts.

Sides include fries, fried corn, and veggie sticks (carrots and/or celery). Sauces include ranch, blue cheese, honey mustard, and cheese sauce.

The menu also includes chocolate brownies as a dessert option.

== See also ==
- List of chicken restaurants
