= Primrose Schools =

American early childhood education provider

- Type: Franchising company
- Industry: Early Childhood Education
- Founded: 1982; 44 years ago
- Founder: Paul Erwin, Marcy Erwin
- Headquarters: Atlanta, Georgia, United States
- Number of locations: 550+ schools (2025)
- Key people: David P. Berg, CEO
- Parent: Roark Capital Group
- Website: www.primroseschools.com

Primrose Schools is a U.S.-based network of franchised accredited private preschools providing early childhood education and child care for children ages infant through Kindergarten. Founded in 1982 in Marietta, Georgia, the company has more than 550 franchised schools across 36 states and Washington, D.C.

The Primrose School of Ashburn in Ashburn, Virginia, in suburban Washington, DC.

== History ==
Primrose Schools was established by Paul and Marcy Erwin in 1982 and began franchising in 1990. It pioneered the concept of combining child care with an educational curriculum, which contributed to its growth into one of the largest early education franchises in the United States.

== Curriculum ==
Primrose offers early childhood education and care for children ages 6 weeks to 6 years and after-school programs for children up to age 12. Primrose schools employ the company's proprietary Balanced Learning® curriculum, which combines teacher-guided learning with child-initiated play. The curriculum incorporates research on child development and emphasizes building character in students.

== The Primrose Friends ==
The Primrose Friends are a group of twelve hand puppets used in Primrose Schools classrooms as part of the Balanced Learning curriculum. They are incorporated into activities such as role-play, music, and reading to support lessons on social-emotional development and character education.

In October 2025, Primrose Schools launched The Primrose Friends, a YouTube channel, featuring educational videos and songs centered on the Primrose Friends. The channel includes content set on a farm inspired by the first Primrose school and aims to extend classroom themes to a digital format.

== Accreditation ==
Primrose Schools requires all locations to maintain Cognia® accreditation, a globally recognized quality assurance standard for educational institutions. Cognia accreditation involves evaluation of learning environments, leadership, and continuous improvement processes.

== Recognition and rankings ==
- Recognized by Newsweek as America’s Best of the Best in Child Care Services.
- Named to Franchise Times Top 100 and honored as a Top Brand for Multi-Unit Owners.
- Received a FUND® Score of 930, one of the highest among all franchise systems, signaling strong financial stability and franchisee support.
- Awarded two Gold Stevie® Awards for Marketing Campaign of the Year and Corporate Social Responsibility Program of the Year in the American Business Awards.
- Recognized by Newsweek as America’s Best of the Best in Child Care Services

== Social responsibility ==
Primrose emphasizes community service and social responsibility at all levels of its organization, from its corporate culture to its curriculum. Defined as one of the corporation's core values, "giving without expecting" is central to the overarching Primrose Promise initiative, which includes programs such as the Primrose Children's Foundation and the Helping Hands Program, as well as numerous independent community service efforts at individual schools. Through the Primrose Children's Foundation, Primrose Schools has supported and partnered with several organizations that focus on the health, welfare, education, and overall support of children, including Children's Miracle Network and Ronald McDonald House Charities. In 2014, Primrose raised over $500,000 for charity, including over $340,000 for its current charitable partners, Reach Out and Read and Save the Children.

=== Primrose Children's Foundation ===
Founded in 2005, the Primrose Children's Foundation is a non-profit organization that combines the fundraising efforts of Primrose Schools across the country to make a larger national impact through charitable support that advances child advocacy and education efforts. Among the foundation's first partnerships was Reach Out and Read, an organization that focuses on the promotion of early literacy. Since 2005, the Primrose Children's Foundation has donated more than $1.4 million to Reach Out and Read. In 2014, Primrose announced a first-of-its-kind partnership with Save the Children through the Primrose Children's Foundation that focuses on the sponsorship of at-risk children in underserved communities within the United States, providing educational resources to those communities and developing relationships between sponsored children and children in Primrose classrooms.
