= Jimmy John's =

American sandwich chain

Jimmy John's Franchise, LLC
- Type: Subsidiary
- Industry: Restaurants
- Genre: Fast food
- Founded: January 13, 1983; 43 years ago Charleston, Illinois, United States
- Founder: Jimmy John Liautaud
- Headquarters: Champaign, Illinois, United States
- Number of locations: 2,800+ (2026)
- Area served: United States; Canada; Chile; El Salvador; South Korea; United Arab Emirates; Mexico
- Key people: Paul J. Brown; Darin Dugan
- Products: Sandwiches; Side dishes
- Parent: Inspire Brands (2019–present)
- Website: jimmyjohns.com

Jimmy John's Franchise, LLC, commonly referred to as Jimmy John's, is an American multinational sandwich chain, headquartered in Champaign, Illinois. The business was founded by Jimmy John Liautaud in 1983. After Liautaud graduated from high school, his father gave him a choice to either join the military or start a business. Liautaud decided to start a hot dog business, which changed to sandwiches due to costs.

The Jimmy John's chain has over 2,800 locations, with 98% of them being franchises. In 2016, Roark Capital Group purchased a majority stake in the company. Later, in 2019, Inspire Brands purchased the company from Roark Capital Group for an unspecified amount.

== History ==
=== Founding ===
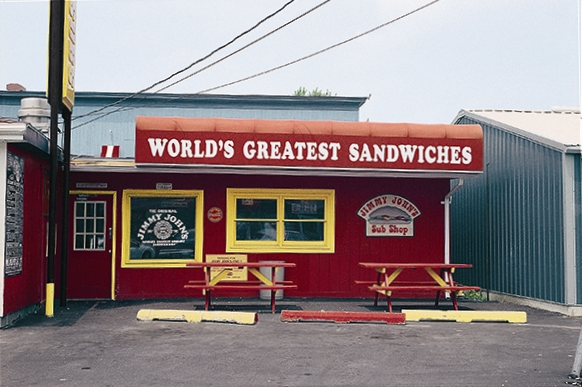
Original Jimmy John's Shop

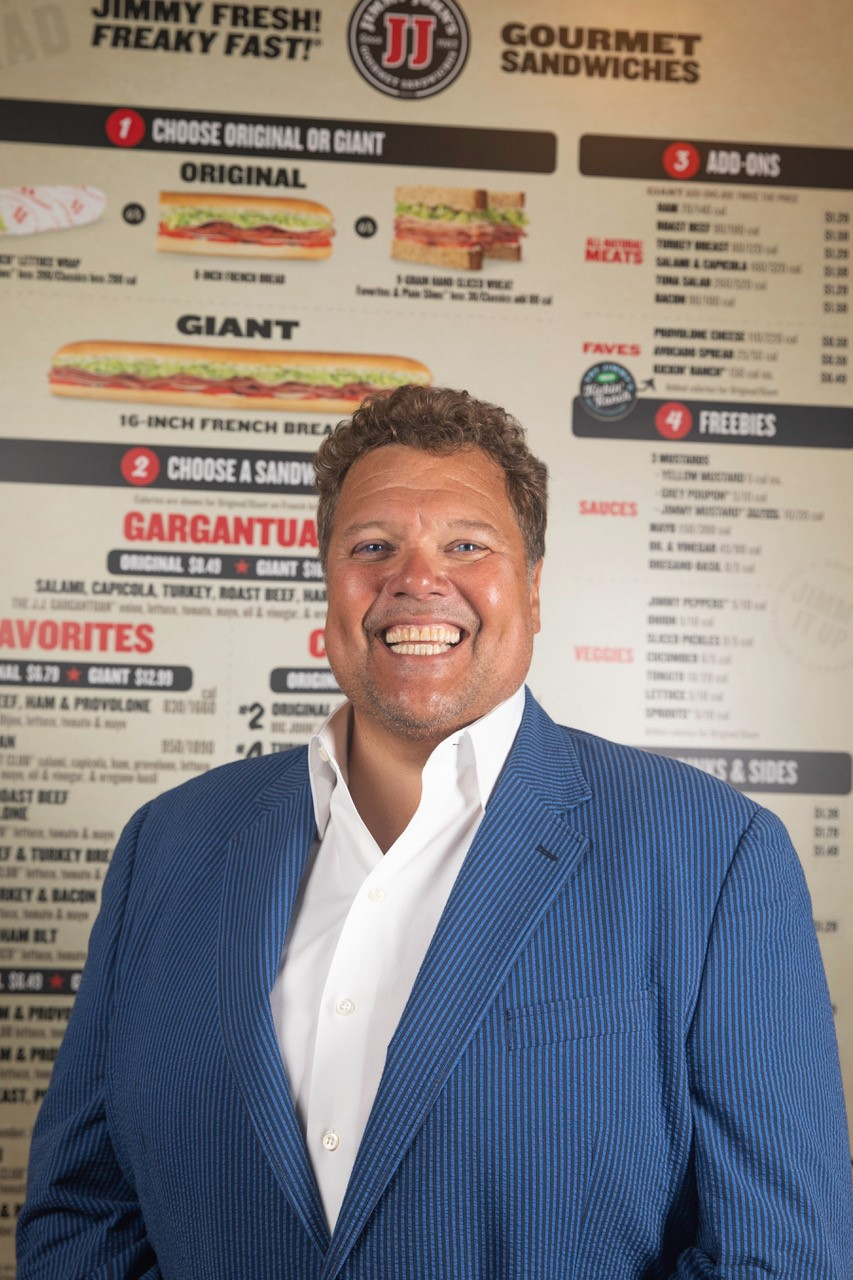
Jimmy John Liautaud in 2018

After Liautaud graduated second to last in his class at Elgin Academy in 1982, his father gave him a choice to either join the Army or start a business. Although his father wanted him to enlist, the younger Liautaud chose the latter, and his father agreed to loan him $25,000 in exchange for a 48% stake in the business. Initially, Liautaud wanted to open a hot dog stand, but after visiting numerous such stands throughout the summer of 1982, he realized the $25,000 would not be enough for such a venture. After a chance encounter at a sandwich shop, he realized that he could open a sandwich shop within his available budget by purchasing premium meats at a neighborhood market and baking his own bread. With the help of his family as tasters, he decided to put four sandwiches on his original menu. Paying $200 a month in rent, Liautaud could afford only used equipment consisting of a refrigerator, a chest freezer, an oven, and a meat slicer.

On January 13, 1983, Jimmy John's Gourmet Sandwiches opened in Charleston, Illinois. Due to the poor location of his first store, Liautaud decided to include delivery of his sandwiches to boost sales. He began by bringing samples door-to-door to the dorms of nearby Eastern Illinois University, which he had attended for one semester.

By the end of his first year, the restaurant started making a profit. In April 1985, Liautaud bought out his father's interest in the business, becoming the sole owner. In 1986, he opened his second store in Macomb, Illinois, and in 1987, he opened a third in Champaign, Illinois.

=== Late 20th century ===
In 1988, Liautaud met Jamie Coulter, who at that time was a Pizza Hut franchisee and would later become the CEO of Lone Star Steakhouse & Saloon. Coulter mentored Liautaud and "taught [him] how to effectively run multiple units." Liautaud continued opening more stores and developed a prototype before beginning franchising in 1994. In 1994, he sold his first Jimmy John's franchise, in addition to the 10 stores owned by Liautaud himself.

The first franchise store opened in Eau Claire, Wisconsin. In 2001, the hundredth Jimmy John's store opened in Mt. Pleasant, Michigan. By 2002, the company had about 200 stores, 10% of which were corporate stores that Liautaud oversaw himself. However, Liautaud noticed that sales at the stores he owned were outpacing the franchised stores by a wide margin.

Liautaud stopped selling franchises for one year to give support to stores that were struggling. Together with his partner, and now president & CEO, James North, he visited 70 of the poorest-performing stores. After 18 months of getting the stores "back to basics" and instilling in them "some of that initial spark", he was able to help the stores become more profitable.

=== 21st century ===
In 2007, the 500th store opened in Seattle, Washington, and in 2010, the 1,000th opened in Beaverton, Oregon. As of March 2017, Jimmy John's had almost 3,000 stores with plans for expansion up to 5,000 and beyond. Liautaud realized that, in order to grow, he would need help acquiring better locations for his stores. Since he had little expertise in real estate, he decided to take on a partner who did. In January 2007, Liautaud sold a 33% stake to Weston Presidio, a San Francisco–based private-equity firm. In the first year after partnering with Weston Presidio, 100 real estate deals were closed. The company has completed two recapitalizations since Weston Presidio's investment.

In the summer of 2015, pictures of Liautaud posing with big game circulated on social media, leading to increased calls to boycott his restaurants. In a 2015 interview with the Chicago Tribune, Liautaud said, "I don't hunt big African game anymore."

In September 2016, Jimmy John's announced that Roark Capital Group had agreed to acquire a majority stake in the company. Terms of the transaction were not immediately disclosed, though it was later clarified that Liautaud retained 35% ownership of the company as part of the deal. As part of the agreement, Liautaud would continue as chairman of the board.

On September 25, 2019, Inspire Brands (affiliated with Roark Capital Group) announced that it was buying Jimmy John's for an unspecified amount in a deal unanimously approved by Liautaud and the rest of the Jimmy John's board of directors. At the close of the deal, Liautaud would step down as chairman of the company and transition to become an adviser to the brand. The acquisition was completed on October 18.

=== Labor relations ===
In 2010, when the Industrial Workers of the World attempted to unionize ten Minneapolis locations, The New York Times called the effort "one of the few efforts to organize fast-food workers in American history". In July 2017, the United States Court of Appeals for the Eighth Circuit found that the National Labor Relations Act did not protect Jimmy John's employees from being fired for exhibiting legally disloyal conduct by attacking the company's product to oppose a franchisee's sick leave policy.

In October 2014, it was revealed that employees at Jimmy John's, including sandwich makers and delivery drivers, were required to sign non-compete agreements as a condition of employment. The agreement restricted the employee from working for a competitor for two years, where a competitor was defined as a business that derives more than ten percent of its revenue from selling sandwiches and is located within three miles of any Jimmy John's. Additionally, the employee could not work for another Jimmy John's franchisee for a year. Jimmy John's has since settled related lawsuits filed by the Attorneys General of New York and Illinois. In statements, the company clarified that it had taken steps to remove non-compete agreements from their new hire paperwork long before they were contacted by the Attorneys General, and that "enforcement of non-compete agreements against our own hourly store employees is not a part of Jimmy John's culture or business model."

== Menu ==
Jimmy John's has three bread options: French, thick-sliced wheat, and the six-inch "Lil' John" (smaller version of French bread), as well as a lettuce-wrap option known as the Unwich, and a tortilla-wrap option. Jimmy John's has 17 different numbered sandwiches plus a B.L.T., called the J.J.B.L.T, and the Gargantuan, which includes all the meats except bacon and tuna. The 17 sandwiches may have ham, roast beef, tuna, turkey, salami, capicola, bacon, provolone cheese or parmesan cheese, or combine two or more meats and cheese. Jimmy John's has four flavors of chips, including regular, BBQ, jalapeño, and salt and vinegar. The menu also includes kosher dill pickles as well as brownies and "triple chunk" chocolate and oatmeal raisin cookies.

In 2021, Jimmy John's began introducing limited-time offers to its menu. The company introduces two to three limited-time offers a year, starting with the "Smokin’ Kickin' Chicken" sandwich in February 2021. Their summer wraps, which started as a limited time offer, became a permanent installation in 2023. In March 2025, Jimmy John's introduced a new line of toasted sandwiches.

== Awards and recognition ==
Jimmy John's was named number one on the Entrepreneur 2016 Franchise 500. In 2014, YouGov BrandIndex ranked restaurant chains that have the highest millennial brand loyalty, and Jimmy John's topped the ranking with 83% of the vote based on restaurants they would consider going to again. Jimmy John's was named the #2 Most Popular Restaurant for Business Meals by expense reporting program Certify. In 2015, Entrepreneur.com named Jimmy John's one of the 10 Promising Franchises for Ambitious Entrepreneurs. In March 2017, Jimmy John's won Franchise Times' "Deal of the Year" for attracting Roark Capital Group as the company's new majority owner. FT's judges called the deal "one of the best private equity deals of all time in the restaurant business."

In 2011 CNN Money listed Jimmy John's as one of ten "Great Franchise Bets". The company estimates that annual sales can be as high as $1.2 million while net profits can average at about $280,000. Real estate start-up costs are estimated to be between $305,000 and $485,500.

== Philanthropy ==
In September 2014, Jimmy John's donated $1 million to the Folds of Honor Foundation, a foundation that supports the families of killed or disabled soldiers. During the 2015 school year, Jimmy John's donated more than 100 laptop computers to the Champaign Unit 4 School District. Jimmy John's donated $125,000 to the Champaign Parks Foundation to support the Youth Scholarship Program in November 2016.

In June 2017, Jimmy John's donated $100,000 to EAT (RED) SAVE LIVES to offer HIV/AIDS medication in sub-Saharan Africa.

In December 2018, Jimmy John's donated $80,000 to pay off all Christmas layaways at Walmart in Champaign, Urbana, and Savoy.

== Sponsorships ==
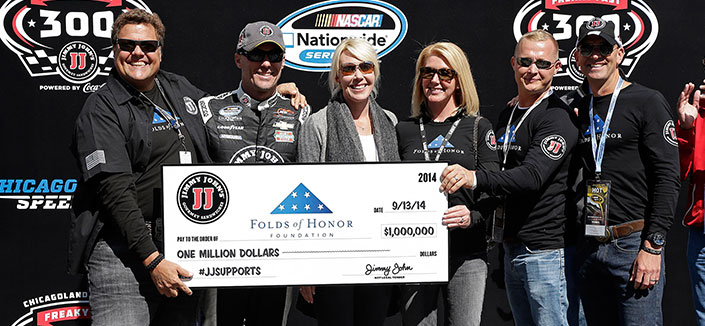
Liautaud with Jimmy John's driver Kevin Harvick and others

Starting in 2007, Jimmy John's began sponsoring NASCAR, first with Steven Wallace in 2007 and 2008. In 2009 and 2010, Jimmy John's sponsored Kevin Harvick in the NASCAR Nationwide Series. In 2011, Jimmy John's and Richard Childress Racing reached a multi-year agreement to sponsor Harvick for the Sprint Cup Series. The 2014 sponsorship continued with Harvick and the Stewart–Haas Racing team. On September 13, 2014, Jimmy John's became the title sponsor of the Jimmy John's Freaky Fast 300 at Chicagoland Speedway. Harvick won the 2014 NASCAR Sprint Cup Championship, giving Jimmy John's their first championship.

From 2010 to 2019, Jimmy John's entered into an Ultimate Fighting Championship sponsorship with Brock Lesnar with logos appearing on his trunks. This sponsorship extended to WWE upon Lesnar's return to that company in 2012, making him the only WWE performer in history to be permitted such a deal.

In 2015, Jimmy John's co-sponsored the RCH Factory Racing Supercross and Motocross team featuring Ken Roczen. The team contested both the Monster Energy AMA Supercross and the Lucas Oil Pro Motocross championships. In June, Jimmy John's sponsored former NASCAR champion Rusty Wallace for his Speed Energy Formula Off-Road debut at the 2015 X Games.

Jimmy John's Field in 2016

In June 2015, it was announced that Jimmy John's purchased the naming rights to the Utica, Michigan, baseball stadium which is the current home of the four teams in the newly formed United Shore Professional Baseball League. Jimmy John's Field opened on May 30, 2016.

Other Jimmy John's sponsorships include the Boston Red Sox, Chicago Blackhawks, Detroit Red Wings, Houston Astros, Nashville Predators, St. Louis Cardinals, Seattle Mariners, and the GoDaddy.com Bowl, among many others.

Jimmy John's owners have also supported local organizations in their communities. Two such sponsored organizations include the Utah Youth Soccer Association and the Arizona Soccer Association.

== FDA warning ==
On February 21, 2020, the U.S. Food and Drug Administration sent an FDA warning letter to Jimmy John's detailing evidence from five outbreaks of human infections with Escherichia coli. The letter said that the evidence demonstrates that the company engaged in a pattern of receiving and selling spoiled produce, specifically clover sprouts and cucumbers. In the letter, the FDA says the Iowa Department of Public Health reported that, as of January 2020, a total of 22 people were infected with the outbreak strain of E. coli. "20 of the 22 case individuals were interviewed by the Iowa Department of Public Health", the FDA stated. "Of the case individuals interviewed, 100% reported eating at one or more of 15 Jimmy John's restaurants." The FDA gave the company 15 days to respond and include specific steps it is taking to address the violations.

== See also ==
- List of submarine sandwich restaurants
