= Miller's Ale House =

American restaurant and sports bar chain

Miller’s Ale House

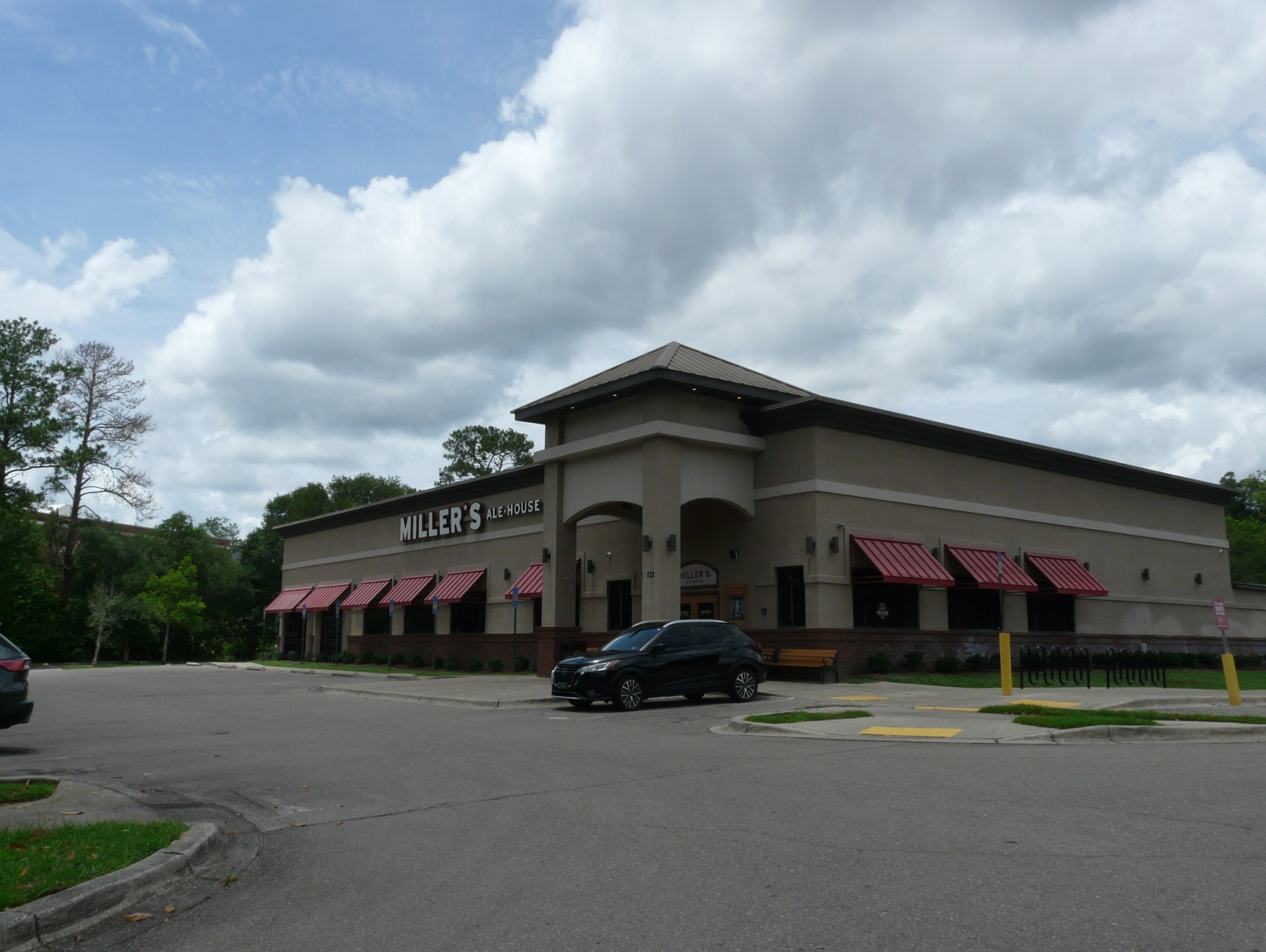
- location in Tallahassee, Florida
- Company type: Private
- Industry: Restaurants
- Genre: Casual dining, American Cuisine, Sports Bar
- Founded: October 1988; 37 years ago Jupiter, Florida, United States
- Founder: Jack Miller
- Number of locations: 103 (2023)
- Key people: Joel Chick (Chief Executive Officer); Phil Hickey (Chairman)
- Products: zingers; hamburgers; steak; chicken; seafood; pasta; salads; alcoholic beverages; craft beer; dessert
- Parent: Roark Capital Group
- Website: millersalehouse.com

Miller's Ale House is a Florida-based American restaurant and sports bar chain which serves steaks, chicken, burgers, salads, seafood, and similar items. Though most of their locations are in Florida, there are several restaurants now open in Georgia, Illinois, Maryland, New Jersey, New York, Pennsylvania, Delaware, Virginia, and Tennessee.

Locations are generally named after the town or neighborhood in which the store is located; for example, Miller's Ale House - Davie in Davie, Florida, or Miller's Ale House - Levittown in Levittown, New York. The use of the name "Miller's" in the name is recent; in the past, each restaurant was named for its location. For instance, the signage for the location in Gainesville, Florida was Gainesville Ale House, the location in Ocala, Florida, was called Ocala Ale House, and the multiple locations around Orlando, Florida, were all called Orlando Ale House. There are 55 locations in Florida, eight in Pennsylvania, seven in Illinois, six in New York, four in New Jersey, three in Tennessee and Maryland, two in Georgia and Ohio, and one in Delaware and Virginia.

== History ==
The first Ale House opened in 1988 in Jupiter, Florida.

In 2003, Nation's Restaurant News reported on Miller's Ale House's rapid expansion in the early 2000s, as well as on the chain's "high-grossing" revenues. According to the publication, average restaurant units grossed $4.1 million annually, and the chain's overall revenue for 2002 exceeded $125 million.

In 2025, Miller's Ale House won the USA Today Reader's Choice Award for best sports bar chain in the US out of over 20 different concepts across the country.
