= Kimberly-Clark de México =

Mexican company

Kimberly-Clark de México, S.A.B. de C.V.
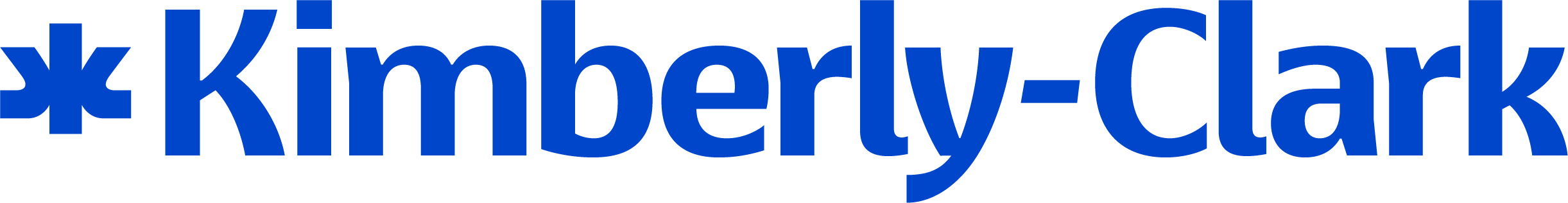
- Company type: Sociedad Anónima Bursátil de Capital Variable
- Traded as: BMV: KIMBER A
- Industry: Paper products
- Founded: 1931; 95 years ago
- Headquarters: México City, Mexico
- Area served: Mexico
- Key people: Claudio X. González Laporte, (Chairman); Pablo González Guajardo, (CEO)
- Products: Kleenex; Huggies; KleenBebe; Kotex; Cottonelle; Escudo
- Revenue: ▲MXN$ 53,307 million(2023)
- Net income: ▲MXN$ 7,013 million (2023)
- Number of employees: 8,000
- Parent: Kimberly-Clark
- Website: www.kimberly-clark.com.mx

Kimberly-Clark de México (KCM) is a Mexican company that engages in the manufacture and commercialization of disposable products for daily use by consumers within and away-from home in Mexico and internationally. The company's products include diapers and childcare products, feminine pads, incontinence care products, bath tissue, napkins, facial tissue, hand and kitchen towels, wet wipes and health care products. Today, the company has 8,000 direct employees and over 10,000 indirect jobs.

== History ==
The origin of KCM dates to the "La Aurora" Paper Factory in 1925 in the municipality of Naucalpan, in the State of Mexico. In 1932 Kimberly-Clark Corporation entered Mexico with its Kotex and Kleenex brands. By 1959, Kimberly-Clark Corporation acquired 100% of the capital of the La Aurora factory, thus becoming Kimberly-Clark de México.

In 1962, Kimberly-Clark Corporation sold 40% of KCM's shares on the Mexican Stock Exchange, marking an important milestone in its history.

In the following years, KCM continued its growth:

- 1973: KCC sold another 17% of KCM shares, to become a Mexican company.
- 1996: KCM acquired and merged Grupo Crisoba, incorporating plants in Ecatepec, Morelia, San Rafael and Texmelucan.
- 2006: KCM sells one of its Business Groups, Industrial Products (PRODIN); forming a new company: GRUPO PAPELERO SCRIBE S.A de C.V.
- 2012: Acquisition of the feeding business of Evenflo Company, expanding their presence in the market.
- 2015: Introduction of Kleenex Soaps, further diversifying their offering.
- 2016: The Escudo Antibacterial brand is acquired from P&G.

On October 22, 2019, the CEO announced that Kimberly-Clark de Mexico will no longer be making short-term investments in Mexico, due to differences with President Andrés Manuel López Obrador and a general slowdown in the economy. This was promptly followed by calls for a boycott of the company. However, this statement was clarified by the company by issuing a statement denying those reports.

In July 2020, the FDA included a number of products by 4E Global, a subsidiary of Kimberly-Clark, on its "do-not-use" list of dangerous hand sanitizers due to possible methanol content.

== Sustainability ==
Kimberly-Clark de México has been recognized in the matter of sustainability, achieving important recognitions in recent years. Since 2017 and each consecutive year, KCM has met the necessary criteria to be part of the British sustainable index FTSE4Good. Additionally, from 2019, it has been recognized in the Dow Jones Sustainability Index (DJSI) in the Latin American Integrated Market (MILA) region.

And from 2020, KCM is among the three Mexican companies included in the Dow Jones Sustainability Index (DJSI) Emerging Markets.
