= Weston Presidio =

American private equity firm

- Type: Private
- Industry: Private equity
- Founded: 1991; 35 years ago
- Founder: Michael Cronin, Michael Lazarus
- Headquarters: John Hancock Tower; Boston, Massachusetts, United States
- Products: Growth capital, Late stage venture
- Total assets: $3.2 billion
- Number of employees: 20+
- Website: www.westonpresidio.com

Weston Presidio is an American private equity firm focused on growth capital investments in late-stage companies across a range of industries with a specific focus on the consumer products, business services, industrial, media, publishing, healthcare and technology sectors.

The firm, which is based in Boston, Massachusetts, has offices in San Francisco and Menlo Park, California.

Weston Presidio was founded in 1991 by Michael Cronin, who had previously run the Boston office of Security Pacific Venture Capital Group, and Michael Lazarus who had previously been managing director of the Private Placement Department of Montgomery Securities. The firm has raised approximately $3.21 billion since inception across five funds. Weston Presidio's fifth fund was raised in 2005 with approximately $1 billion of investor commitments and has been focused primarily on investments in more mature companies.

Weston Presidio historical logo

Through the years, Weston Presidio has shifted its focus from earlier stage venture capital to investments in more mature companies and occasionally through leveraged recapitalizations and leveraged buyouts.

Among Weston Presidio's most notable investments are: Associated Materials, Azul Brazilian Airlines, BlueArc, Boston Herald, Casella Waste Systems, Cybertrust, DTS Digital Theater Systems, Evenflo, Fender Musical Instruments Corporation, Learning Curve Brands, JetBlue Airways, Jimmy John's, Lion Brewery, Inc., MacDermid, MapQuest, Morris Air, Nebraska Book Company, NextMedia Group, Papyrus, Party City (a.k.a. Amscan), Restoration Hardware, Robb Report, Scene7, Thomas Weisel Partners, Tweeter Home Entertainment and Wild Oats Markets.
