= Martine Liautaud =

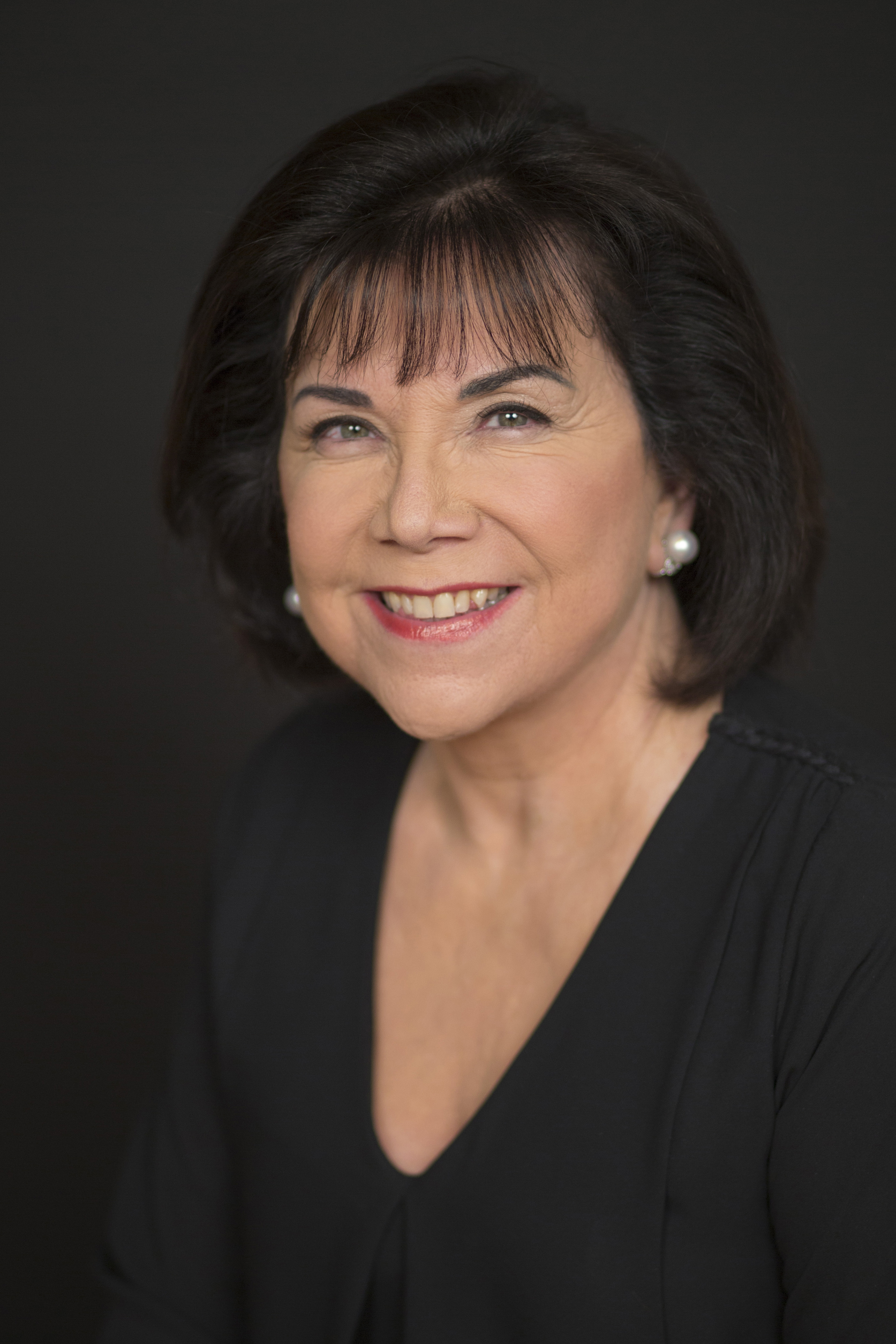
Martine Liautaud

Martine Liautaud is an international financial executive and entrepreneur who has been an active advocate for the mentoring of women in the business world. She was appointed a Chevalier de la Legion d’Honneur in 2011.

Liautaud graduated from the Stanford Executive Program in 1989 and is also a graduate of law from the University of Paris (Pantheon-Sorbonne). She was a banker with Banque Indosuez and later established an investment bank, Liautaud & Cie, in 2000.

Liautaud has established and advanced two organizations to further women's interests in the workplace. In 2010, Liautaud founded the Women Business Mentoring Initiative (WBMI) to support women entrepreneurs with targeted advice and personalized guidance. Then in 2015, she set up the Women Initiative Foundation to broaden her action in favor of women in the business world. According to a 2017 profile in Forbes, Liautaud's Women Initiative Foundation will sponsor a program at Stanford for 40 entrepreneurial women from around the world, with many other events scheduled throughout the year including studies on European entrepreneurship towards the end of 2017, as well as other university programs.

In a 2016 interview in Le Figaro, Liautaud stated that “Senior executives need to promote women. We need to convince them that they’re depriving themselves of talent and that they can’t continue to manage companies as they used to.”

Her book Breaking Through: Stories and Best Practices From Companies That Help Women Succeed was published by John Wiley & Sons in April 2016.
