= Dave's Hot Chicken =

Nashville-style fried chicken restaurant chain

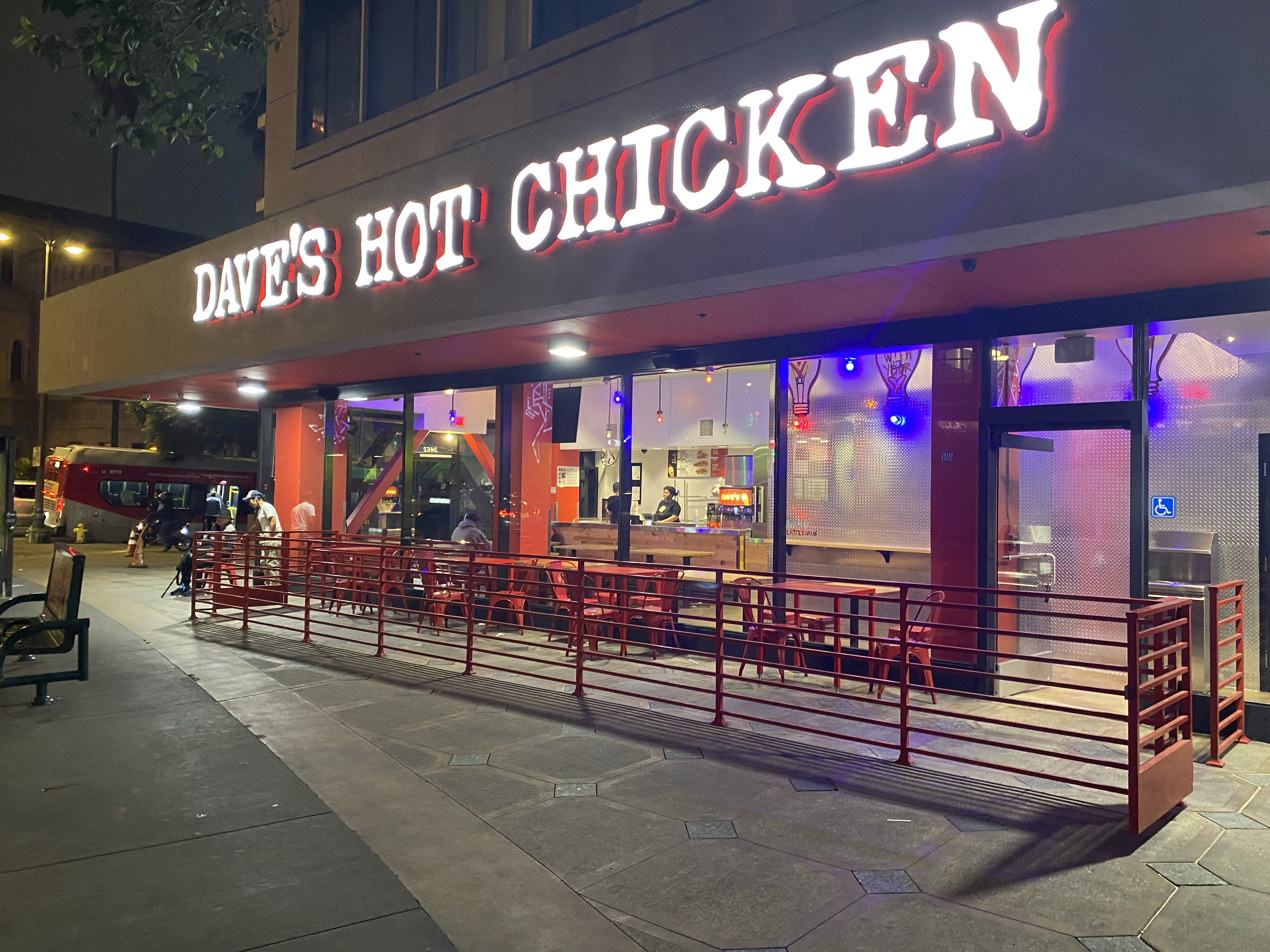
- Dave's Hot Chicken location in Koreatown, Los Angeles, California
- Type: Private
- Industry: Restaurant
- Genre: Fast casual
- Founded: May 2, 2017; 9 years ago Los Angeles, California
- Founders: Dave Kopushyan; Arman Oganesyan; Tommy Rubenyan; Gary Rubenyan
- Headquarters: Pasadena, California
- Number of locations: 283 (December 26, 2024)
- Area served: United States; Canada; Kuwait; Qatar; Saudi Arabia; United Arab Emirates; United Kingdom; Ireland
- Key people: Jim Bitticks (CEO)
- Products: Hot chicken; French fries; Macaroni and cheese; Coleslaw; Milkshakes; Mozzarella sticks; Chicken nuggets
- Owner: Roark Capital Group
- Website: www.daveshotchicken.com

Dave's Hot Chicken is an American fast casual restaurant chain headquartered in Pasadena, California, specializing in Nashville-style hot chicken. Founded in 2017, the company operates over 390 locations across United States, Canada, United Kingdom, Ireland and Middle East as of 2026.

Dave's Hot Chicken has received investment from a number of celebrity investors including Drake, Samuel L. Jackson, Maria Shriver, Michael Strahan and Tom Werner. In June 2025, Dave's Hot Chicken was acquired by the private equity firm Roark Capital in a deal valued at $1 billion.

== History ==
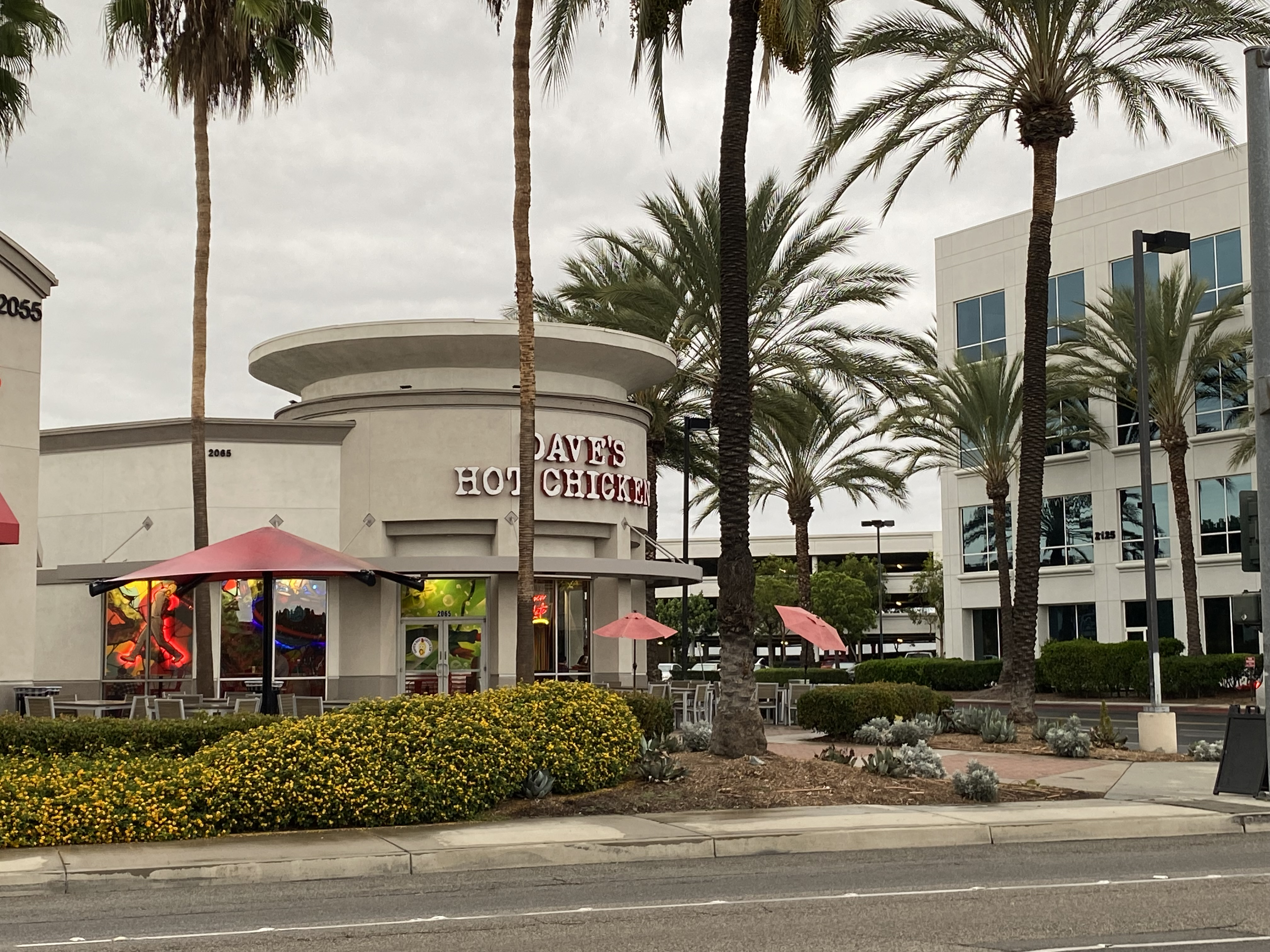
Dave's Hot Chicken location in Anaheim, California

The first Dave's Hot Chicken opened in May 2017. It was founded by Armenian-American childhood friends Dave Kopushyan, Arman Oganesyan, Tommy Rubenyan, and Gary Rubenyan. Inspired by the simple business model of In-N-Out Burger and the growing demand for fried chicken in Los Angeles, the founders pooled $900 to set up a small parking lot stand in East Hollywood. Kopushyan, a professional chef who trained under restaurateur Thomas Keller at the three-Michelin-star restaurant The French Laundry, developed the chain's signature hot chicken recipe.

Initially, the street food stand operated with a portable fryer, a few picnic tables, and a menu that only featured a hot chicken combo plate. Following a feature on the food blog Eater Los Angeles, the stand gained popularity and generated long lines that reportedly stretched around the block at times. By late 2018, the founders closed the stand and opened a restaurant in a nearby strip mall on Western Avenue. In fall 2019, they partnered with an investment group, including former Wetzel's Pretzels CEO and co-founder Bill Phelps as well as movie producer John Davis, to franchise the restaurant. The agreement outlined plans for more than 300 locations in the United States and Canada, with Phelps named as the chain's new CEO. In January 2026, Jim Bitticks was named the new CEO.

By winter 2019, the chain opened its 2nd and 3rd locations in North Hollywood and Koreatown. Between late 2020 and early 2021, the company expanded into Orange County with stores in Anaheim, Orange, Irvine, and Tustin. In 2021, it entered the San Francisco Bay Area with stores in Santa Rosa and Union City, followed by openings in Oakland, Sunnyvale, and San Leandro the following year. Throughout 2021, the chain opened more than 30 new locations, expanding into Colorado, Illinois, Michigan, Nevada, Ohio, Oregon, and Texas. The brand established its first locations in Seattle and Pennsylvania in 2023.

Expansion continued through 2024, with the opening of a South Burlington location at Vermont's University Mall on September 13, and a Georgia location in Conyers that August. The Georgia franchise is owned by Lawrence Kourie, Andrew Feghali, and the musician Usher. By 2025, there were five locations in the Portland metropolitan area. That same year, the private equity firm Roark Capital Group acquired Dave's Hot Chicken in a deal valued at $1 billion to support further expansion.

=== International expansion ===
In May 2020, Dave's Hot Chicken signed an agreement with Bite Brands (a subsidiary of Obelysk Inc.) to open 25 restaurants in Canada. The chain's first international location opened in Toronto in January 2021. In September 2022, Dave's Hot Chicken opened in Dubai, United Arab Emirates. In November 2022, Dave's Hot Chicken opened in Doha, Qatar.

On July 20, 2023, the chain came to Riyadh, Saudi Arabia. In July 2024, Dave's Hot Chicken signed a deal with Azzurri Group to open 60 restaurants in the UK. The first British location opened on Shaftesbury Avenue, London, on December 7, 2024.

In September 2025, the company announced plans to open 180 restaurants in Europe across 10 countries including France, Portugal, Spain, and Germany. This expansion includes the 60 UK locations previously announced in July 2024, with Azzurri Group serving as the master franchisee for Europe.

In June 2026, Dave's Hot Chicken opened its first Irish location in Dublin, Ireland.

== Menu ==
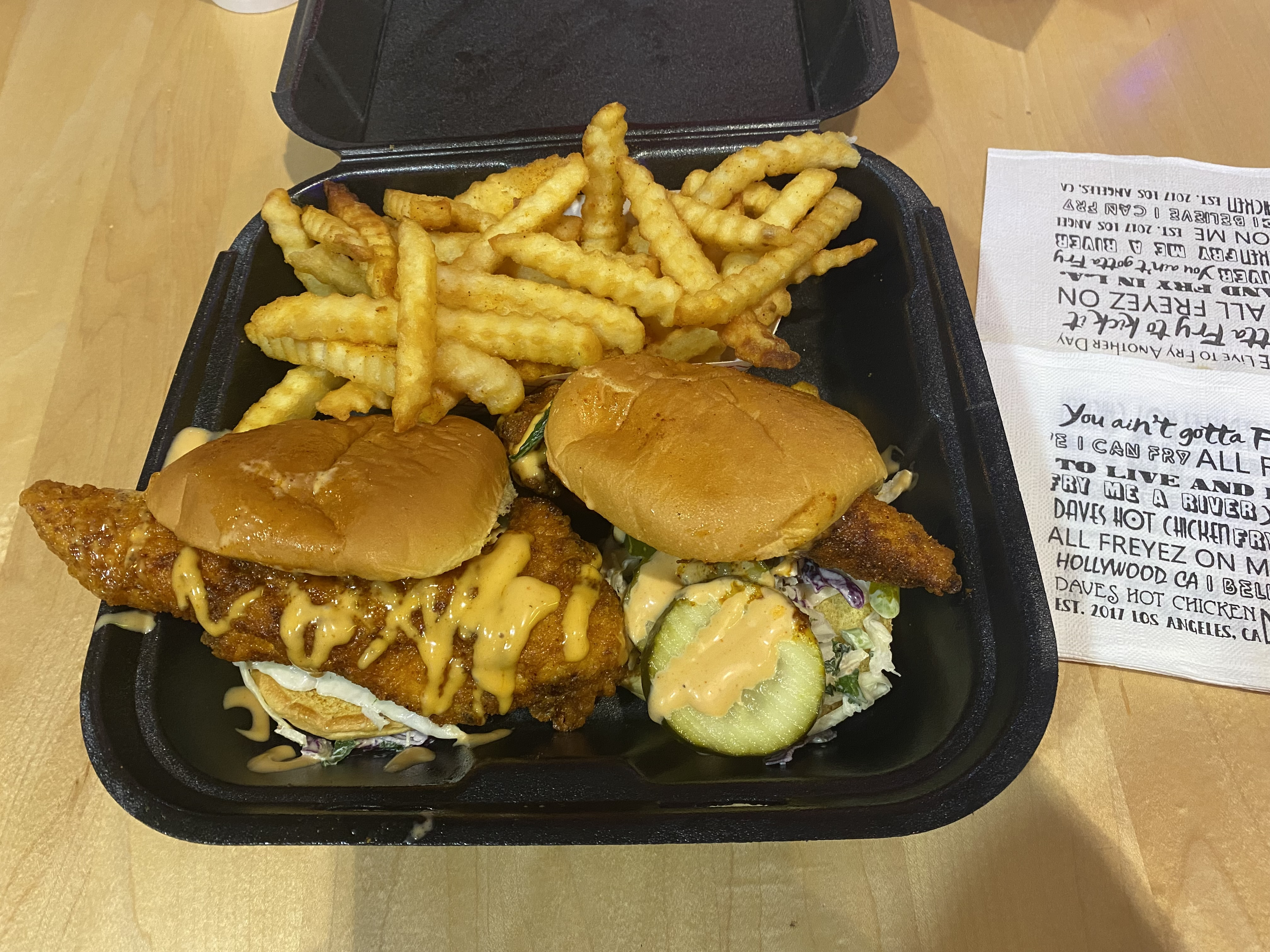
2 slider combo from Dave's Hot Chicken

The chain's menu features two options: chicken tenders and sliders, served alongside various sides. Tenders are served on white bread, while sliders are served on buns with pickles, kale slaw, and a chipotle mayonnaise-based "Dave's Sauce." Customers can choose from seven spice levels, ranging from "no spice" to "reaper," the latter of which requires a signed waiver. Sides include french fries, cheese fries, macaroni and cheese, and kale slaw, which consists of vegetables, mayonnaise, and spices. All locations serve halal chicken.

In January 2024, Dave's Hot Chicken added cauliflower-based vegetarian menu items under the branding of "Dave's NOT Chicken": "Dave's Cauliflower Sliders", "Tenders" and "Bites".

== See also ==
- List of casual dining restaurant chains
- List of chicken restaurants
