= Goodbaby International =

International child products company

- Company type: Public
- Traded as: HKEx: 01086
- Industry: Consumer Products
- Founded: 1989; 37 years ago
- Founder: Song Zhenghuan
- Headquarters: Shanghai, China
- Key people: Song Zhenghuan (Founder and Chairman), Martin Pos (Global CEO)
- Products: Car seats, travel systems, safety gates, high chairs, play yards, stationary activity centers, infant carriers, doorway jumpers
- Number of employees: 12,318
- Website: gbinternational.com.hk

Goodbaby International is a Chinese company incorporated in the Cayman Islands and headquartered in Shanghai. It manufactures products for babies and children including designing, research and development, marketing and sale of many children’s products worldwide such as strollers, child seats.

The company is listed on the Main Board of the Hong Kong Stock Exchange (1086:HK) and operates brands such as Goodbaby, GB, Cybex, Evenflo, CBX, Rollplay, Happy Dino, Urbini, and other branded kids-children's products.

As of 2009, Goodbaby International manufactured over 10,000 strollers a day under 15 different, mostly overseas brands.

== History ==
=== Foundation and early years ===
In 1989 Zhenghuan Song designed a children’s rocking chair and founded Goodbaby International. In 1990 chairman Zhenghuan Song establishes R&D center in Kunshan, and in 1999, the company becomes the largest supplier of strollers in North America.

=== Going Public ===
In 2011 the company went public on the Hong Kong stock exchange. Ticker (HKEx: 01086)

=== Acquisitions and Growth ===
In January 2014, Goodbaby International acquired Cybex. Goodbaby anticipated not only to extend the product portfolio into premium car safety seats and reinforce its footing into Europe, but also to use Cybex's extensive experience in branding and marketing.

In July 2014 Goodbaby International acquired Evenflo, one of the largest U.S. makers of strollers.

== Products ==
Goodbaby International's core products include car seats, strollers, and other baby products.
