= HR.com =

- Website type: Professional network service for HR
- Owner: Debbie McGrath
- Website: www.hr.com
- Registration: free
- Launched: 1999

HR.com is a social networking platform designed for human resources (HR) professionals to share the best practices and research techniques in their field.

== Background ==
HR.com Limited is a privately held company based in Jacksons Point, Canada. HR.com was established in 1999 by Debbie McGrath, who previously set up CEO Group Inc., which was later sold to the Washington Post. It was originally set up as an online magazine for HR professionals, but was subsequently turned into a social network.

HR.com has conducted industry surveys with results featured in trade publications such as CNY Business Journal, Training & Development, Canadian Manager, and Atlanta Business Chronicle.
