= Roark Capital Group =

American private equity firm

Roark Capital Management, LLC
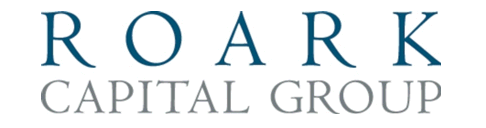
- Company type: Private
- Industry: Private equity
- Founded: 2001; 25 years ago
- Founder: Neal Aronson (managing partner)
- Headquarters: Atlanta, Georgia, U.S.
- Key people: Paul D. Ginsberg (president); Erik O. Morris (Chief Investment Officer)
- Products: Leveraged buyout
- AUM: US$37 billion (2023)
- Number of employees: 138
- Website: roarkcapital.com

Roark Capital Management, LLC, also known as Roark Capital Group or simply Roark Capital, is an American private equity firm with around $37 billion in assets under management. The firm is focused on leveraged buyout investments in middle-market companies, primarily in the franchise/multi-location, restaurant and food, health and wellness, and business services sectors. It is named for Howard Roark, the protagonist in Ayn Rand's novel The Fountainhead. The firm claims that its name is not meant to connote any particular political philosophy but instead signify the firm's admiration for the iconoclastic qualities of independence and self-assurance embodied by the central figure in The Fountainhead.

== History ==
The firm, which is based in Atlanta, Georgia, was founded in 2001 by the current Managing Partner, Neal K. Aronson. Prior to founding Roark Capital Group in 2001, Aronson was a co-founder of U.S. Franchise Systems in 1995.

In March 2026, Roark Capital Group was considering an initial public offering for Inspire Brands which would raise about $2 billion as early as 2026.

== Investments ==
Roark's current and former portfolio companies include:

=== Current investments ===
- Aftermath Services
- Anytime Fitness
- CKE Restaurants: (Carl's Jr., Hardee's, Green Burrito & Red Burrito)
- Culver's (minority investment)
- Dave's Hot Chicken
- Divisions Maintenance Group
- Driven Brands: 1-800-Radiator & A/C, Abra, CARSTAR, International Car Wash Group/ICWG, Maaco, Meineke, Merlin 200,000 Mile Shops, Xpress Lube, Take 5 Oil Change, Pro Oil Change, Econo Lube & Tune
- Fitness Connection
- GoTo Foods (formerly Focus Brands): Auntie Anne's, Carvel, Cinnabon, Jamba Juice, McAlister's Deli, Moe's Southwest Grill, Schlotzsky's
- Great Expressions Dental Centers
- Home Service Store
- Inspire Brands: (Arby's, Buffalo Wild Wings, Sonic Drive-In, Jimmy John's, Dunkin', Mister Donut, Baskin-Robbins)
- Installation Made Easy
- Jim 'N Nick's BBQ Restaurants
- Massage Envy
- Mathnasium
- Miller's Ale House
- Orangetheory Fitness
- Pet Retail Brands: (Bosley's, Pet Supermarket, PetValu) Petstores
- Primrose Schools
- Self Esteem Brands: (Basecamp Fitness, The Bar Method, Waxing the City)
- ServiceMaster Brands: (ServiceMaster Clean, ServiceMaster Restore, AmeriSpec, Furniture Medic, Merry Maids)
- Subway
- Youth Enrichment Brands: (School of Rock)

=== Former investments ===
- Atkins Nutritionals
- Batteries Plus Bulbs
- The Cheesecake Factory
- Cyber Core Technologies
- Drybar
- Fastsigns
- GFL Environmental
- Il Fornaio: (Corner Bakery Cafe)
- Money Mailer
- Movie Gallery
- Naf Naf Grill
- Peachtree Business Products
- PSC Info Group
- Qualawash
- Solterra Recycling
- United States Arbitrage Finance II
- USFS
- Waste Pro
- Wingstop
