= Milio's Sandwiches =

Restaurant chain

- Founded: 1989; 37 years ago
- Founder: Mike Liautaud
- Headquarters: Fitchburg, Wisconsin, United States
- Number of locations: 19 (April 2024)
- Website: milios.com

Milio's Sandwiches is a restaurant chain founded in Madison, Wisconsin in 1989 as a single sandwich shop on West Johnson Street on the University of Wisconsin–Madison campus. In 2023, there are 19 franchise and company locations across Wisconsin, Minnesota, and Iowa. The company headquarters is located in Fitchburg, Wisconsin.

== Overview ==
Milio's was started in 1989 as a sandwich shop on West Johnson Street. Demand for Milio's grew, and expansion began around Madison. In 2004, the company began franchising and changed its name from Big Mike's Super Subs to Milio's Sandwiches. Each store bakes fresh bread every four hours, every day.

In October 2020, close friends Brian Bergen, Timm Heller, Todd Mancusi, Tony Mancusi, and Chris Gentilli became owners of Milio's Sandwiches. The company has been recognized for its community involvement program that was founded in 2021 and gives back to local nonprofits.

Milio's Sandwiches was awarded the silver and bronze medals in Madison Magazine's Best of Madison and Awards for Best Sandwich Spot, respectively.

== Products ==
Milio's Sandwiches has several signature sandwiches available on different bread and wrap options. The menu also features seasonal soup offerings, cookies, chips, rotating specialty sandwiches, and more.

Milio's Sandwiches created a new mobile ordering app in 2022.
