= Baby Safety Alliance =

North American trade association for baby and children's products

- Formation: 1962; 64 years ago
- Founder: Group of US baby and children's products manufacturers
- Type: Trade association
- Legal status: 501(c)(3) organization
- Purpose: Represent the manufacturers and importers of baby and children's products and set product safety standards
- Location: New Jersey, United States
- Region served: United States, Canada, and Mexico
- Services: Advocacy, product safety, education, and philanthropy
- Website: babysafetyalliance.org
- Formerly called: Juvenile Products Manufacturers Association (JPMA)

The Baby Safety Alliance, formerly Juvenile Products Manufacturers Association (JPMA), is a North American trade association that represents the baby and children's product industry defined as from prenatal to preschool. The alliance represents companies in the United States, Canada, and Mexico who manufacture, import and/or distribute infant products.

== History ==
The idea for Alliance was born in 1959 when a group of juvenile products manufacturers came together as the voice of the industry when the United States government imposed an automotive tax that applied to car seats. By pooling resources and streamlining their efforts, the manufacturers proved that the tax was unfair and it was revoked.

Afterwards, the manufacturers recognized the need for an official association which would protect their interests and promote the entire industry. A group of manufacturers began to address the common issues facing the industry and in 1962, the organization obtained its charter and officially became recognized as the Juvenile Product Manufacturers Association.

The organization changed its name to the Baby Safety Alliance in June 2025.

== Certification ==
The alliance has developed a comprehensive Certification Program to help guide parents and caregivers toward purchasing juvenile products that are built with safety in mind. The JPMA Certification Seal on a product tells consumers this product has been verified as conforming to the requirements established by ASTM, through independent laboratory testing and follow-up on-site inspection of the manufacturer's production line.

== Lobbying ==
The JPMA's lobbying budget increased by a factor of four in 2008 (compared to 2007), concurrent with the Consumer Product Safety Improvement Act of 2008.
