= Lone Star Steakhouse & Saloon =

Casual dining restaurant chain

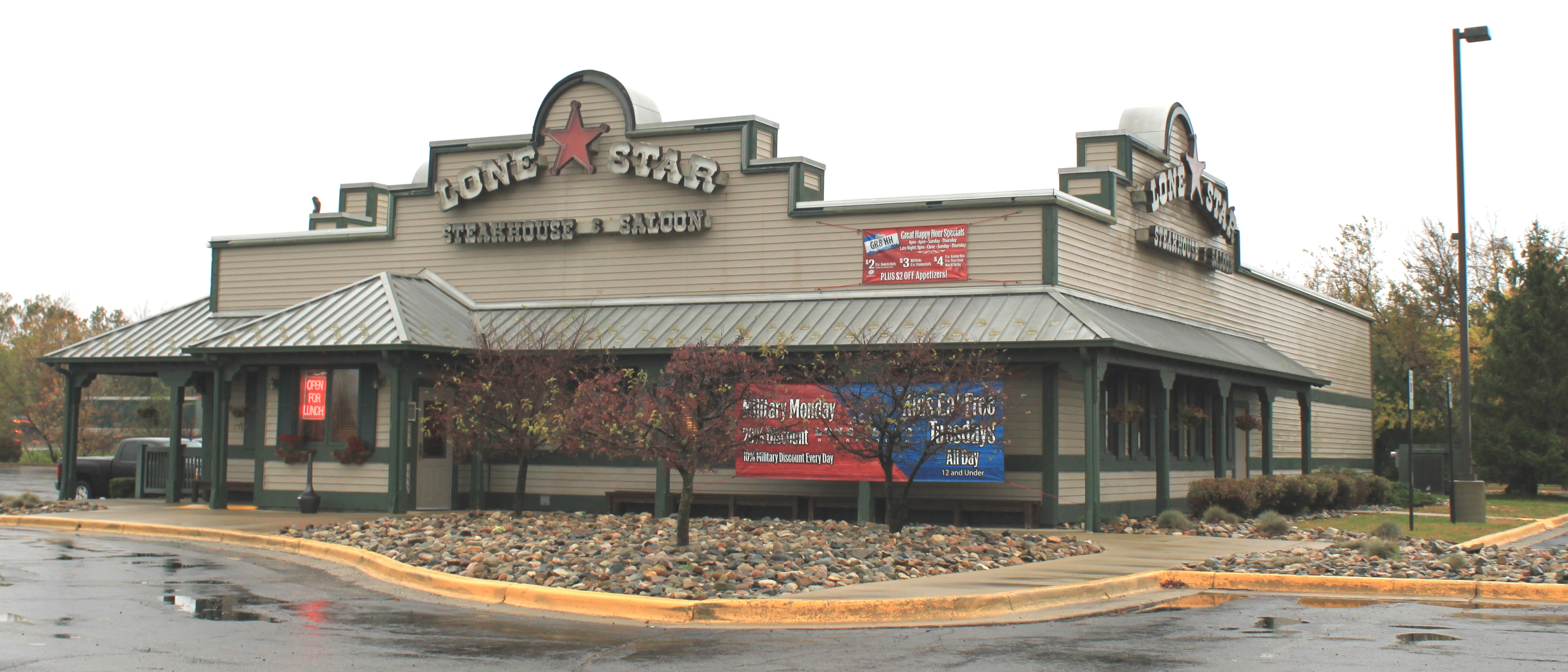
- Jackson, Michigan, location as shown in 2011
- Company type: Private
- Industry: Restaurants
- Founded: 1989; 37 years ago
- Defunct: 2019 (as a chain; single franchise still survives on Guam)
- Headquarters: Plano, Texas
- Number of locations: 1
- Areas served: Guam, United States
- Products: Burgers, Steak, Seafood, Salad
- Parent: Day Star Restaurant Group
- Website: Last archive of website for former chain; Guam restaurant

Lone Star Steakhouse & Saloon is an American casual dining restaurant chain with a single independently owned and operated franchise still in business in 2021 on the island of Guam. The chain served steak, seafood, salad, and similar food items. Lone Star opened its first restaurant in 1989 in Winston-Salem, North Carolina. In March 1992, Lone Star became a public company with eight restaurants opened. At its maximum, 267 Lone Star Steakhouses were in operation. The company filed for Chapter 11 bankruptcy in February 2017.

As of December 2025, the chain has one location in Tamuning, Guam.

== History ==
=== Founding and expansion ===
Lone Star was founded by Jamie B. Coulter, who started his restaurant career as a major franchisee of the Pizza Hut chain. Separately, a company called Creative Culinary Concepts opened a prototype Lone Star Steakhouse & Saloon restaurant in Winston-Salem, North Carolina, in 1989. in 1991, Coulter signed an agreement with Creative Culinary Concepts to open 4 Lone Star restaurants, which would have a Texas Roadhouse-style ambiance. Coulter incorporated Lone Star Steakhouse & Saloon in January 1992, becoming the President, CEO, and Chairman of the chain.

The chain, at this point featuring eight restaurants, went public in March 1992 to raise the cash for expansion. The initial public offering raised $91 million. In 1993, 1994, and 1995, Lone Star was awarded the distinction of "best small business in the country" by Forbes, and in 1994 ranked No. 6 in Fortune magazine's list of fastest-growing companies – a higher rank than any other restaurant. Coulter himself was named chief executive of the year in 1996 by Restaurants and Institutions.

By the end of 1995, there were 182 restaurants in operation, which expanded further to 205 locations by March 1997 and further yet to 265 by the end of that same year. However, Lone Star faced problems with market saturation, rising food and labor costs, declining same-store sales, and management turnover as the company entered the late 90s. The company's growth came to a sudden halt, with the chain reaching its maximum extent of 267 restaurants after opening just two in all of 1998, and ended the 1990s with 265 restaurants after closing two in 1999. During this time, the company's stock price plummeted from $46 in 1996 to just $6 by the end of 1998. As a result of this turmoil, a minor shareholder in Lone Star, Guy W. Adams, waged a successful battle to unseat Coulter as chairman of the Board of Directors of the company he had founded, though Coulter maintained his position of CEO. Lone Star had begun to seek a buyer to take the company private in 2002.

=== Private buyout ===
On August 18, 2006, the 222-restaurant large Lone Star Steakhouse chain signed an agreement to be acquired by Lone Star Funds, an unaffiliated, Dallas-based private equity firm, for $27.10 per share in cash. This initial agreement was opposed by some major shareholders. On November 11, 2006, Lone Star Funds raised its offer to $27.35 per share. On December 12, 2006, shareholders voted to accept the offer.

Under Lone Star Funds' ownership, and largely in response to the Great Recession, Lone Star significantly reduced its restaurant locations. This included closures in early 2014 that totaled 27 restaurants, bringing the chain down to 152 locations. The closures continued, including another large-scale restaurant closing in September 2015 that saw another 19 units close, bringing the chain down to 112 locations.

In December 2015, Lone Star Steakhouse and Texas Land & Cattle restaurant chains were acquired by the newly formed Day Star Restaurant Group, at which point there were 78 Lone Star Steakhouses in operation. Day Star co-founder Scott Smith left Day Star in March 2016 due to disagreements with his business partners, mainly Jean Stupec and Kimberly Anderson, over the direction of the company. After Smith's departure, restaurant closures accelerated, with the Lone Star brand declining from 64 locations at the end of December 2015 down to 16 locations in January 2017. Among these closures was the closure of the original Lone Star Steakhouse in Winston-Salem, North Carolina, which shut down in the summer of 2016.

=== Bankruptcy and closure ===
After closing most of the remaining restaurants, Lone Star Steakhouse filed for Chapter 11 Bankruptcy Protection in February 2017. The Chapter 11 restructuring was converted to a Chapter 7 bankruptcy filing on September 7, 2017.

The chain's last four restaurants in the continental United States shut down in 2018 and 2019. The location in Mount Vernon, Illinois closed in March 2019; in Mount Pleasant, Michigan, closed on October 5, 2018; in Asheville, North Carolina, closed on July 2, 2018; and in Middletown, Ohio, closed in September 2018.

As of December 2025, the chain has one location in Tamuning, Guam.
