= Shadow of a Woman =

1946 film by Joseph Santley

- Theatrical release poster
- Directed by: Joseph Santley
- Screenplay by: Whitman Chambers; C. Graham Baker
- Based on: He Fell Down Dead; 1943 novel by Virginia Perdue
- Produced by: William Jacobs
- Starring: Helmut Dantine; Andrea King; William Prince
- Narrated by: Andrea King
- Cinematography: Bert Glennon
- Edited by: Christian Nyby
- Music by: Adolph Deutsch
- Production company: Warner Bros. Pictures
- Distributed by: Warner Bros. Pictures
- Release date: September 14, 1946 (United States)
- Running time: 78 minutes
- Country: United States
- Language: English
- Budget: $427,000
- Box office: $732,000

Shadow of a Woman is a 1946 American drama film noir directed by Joseph Santley and starring Helmut Dantine, Andrea King and William Prince. The film is based on the novel He Fell Down Dead written by Virginia Perdue.

== Plot ==
Inside a San Francisco police station, Brooke Gifford Ryder is questioned about the death of her husband, Dr. Eric Ryder. She reflects she first met Eric four weeks prior in Monterrey, having moved there on the advice of her physician Dr. Norris as she is on the verge of a breakdown following her parents' deaths. Less than a week later, she married Eric. During their honeymoon, at a restaurant, a palm reader predicts happiness in Brooke's future but states that nothing can be said about Eric's future.

The next day, on a beach, a boulder rolls off and nearly hits Eric. Back in their hotel room, Eric makes light of Brooke's premonition and when he discovers Norris's letter, he expresses resentment for medical doctors as he believes diseases can be cured by a healthy diet. Outside their hotel, Eric spots two mysterious men and suggests they leave for Ben Lomond. During their drive there, the same men follow after Brooke and Eric.

When they arrive at the lodge, Timothy Freeman, whose wife was a former patient of Eric's, approaches them. Freeman's wife had died during surgery when Freeman took her for operation against Eric's advice. That same night, Freeman shoots at Eric and runs when he misses. Immediately after, David MacKeller, his ex-wife Louise's attorney, takes a photograph of them and reminds Eric of the custody battle for their five-year-old son Philip. David comforts Brooke and asks her to support his case when they return to San Francisco.

Returning from their honeymoon, Eric drives Brooke to his house which he shares with his sister and nephew, Emma and Carl. As advised by Eric, Philip has been placed on a liquid diet. Elsewhere, MacKellar plans to use his photograph as court evidence against Eric. On the other hand, Eric plans to announce his new marriage in court so he can retain custody of Philip.

One night, Eric treats his patient, Mrs. Calvin, as she lies ill on the bed. Brooke witnesses him ease her pain by simply talking to her. During breakfast, Brooke feeds Philip and learns that her stepson will inherit his grandfather's wealth when he turns 25. Dr. Norris visits Brooke to inform her that Mrs. Calvin has died and accuses Eric of quackery, though she does not reveal her marriage. Brooke confronts her husband about Mrs. Calvin's death, but Eric blames the doctors instead and forbids Brooke from feeding Philip.

Mrs. Calvin's daughter Genevieve arrives and threatens to expose Eric to the press. Eric takes Genevieve home and medicates her before she falls asleep. Having fallen out of love, Brooke writes to Dr. Norris that Eric is slowly starving Philip. Back home, Brooke drinks a drugged cup of coffee, falls unconscious, but wakes up and she sneaks out of the house. At a diner, she encounters MacKellar and divulges her marriage to help his case.

Brooke returns home where Emma and Carl reveal they indeed drugged Brooke so they could locate the letter she had written to Dr. Norris. She later arrives at MacKellar's office to accuse her husband of quackery. Louise also believes Eric is not Philip's actual father. Despite these claims, MacKellar believes their case lacks credible witnesses. Brooke immediately suggests Freeman and Genevieve, though it's discovered they are both dead. Convinced they were murdered, Brooke believes Philip is the next victim.

Brooke races back home and learns that Emma and Carl have been ordered out. Eric eavesdrops during Brooke's telephone call and marches upstairs to confront her. Eric attempts to push Brooke off the balcony, but Carl arrives and viciously fights his uncle who falls off the balcony and dies. As Brooke finishes her story, the police inspector does not believe her story, but when MacKellar comes to her defense, he declares that Eric's death will be ruled an accident.

== Cast ==
- Helmut Dantine as Dr. Eric Ryder
- Andrea King as Brooke Gifford Ryder
- William Prince as David G. MacKellar
- John Alvin as Carl
- Becky Brown as Genevieve Calvin
- Richard Erdman as Joe
- Peggy Knudsen as Louise Ryder
- Don McGuire as Johnnie
- Lisa Golm as Emma
- Larry Geiger as Philip Ryder
- Monte Blue as Mike
- J. Scott Smart as Timothy Freeman
- Leah Baird as Mrs. Calvin
- Lottie Williams as Sarah
- Paul Stanton as Dr. Nelson Norris
- Paul Harvey as Howard K. Brooks, Chief of Detectives (uncredited)

== Reception ==
In the 21st century, film critic Dennis Schwartz panned the film, writing, "A failure in every possible way. Joseph Santley flatly directs this film noir adapted from Virginia Perdue's novel He Fell Down Dead. The script by writers C. Graham Baker and Whitman Chambers was lacking credibility. The acting was hammy and unconvincing. The film offered hardly any entertainment value and the irrelevant story was more of a turn off than anything else. On top of all that, there were serious gaffes in the plotline that filled the story with holes the size of craters. This postwar B-film melodrama reunites Hotel Berlin co-stars Helmut Dantine and Andrea King. Shadow of a Woman might be remembered by film buffs only because it played in an early restaurant scene "How Little We Know", the Hoagy Carmichael song that Lauren Bacall sang in To Have and Have Not."

TV Guide wrote about the screenplay, writing, "A slightly unrealistic story line hinders this drama that deals with a bride's terror."

=== Box office ===
According to Warner Bros figures, Shadow of a Woman earned $490,000 domestically and $242,000 foreign.
