= Michael Vale =

American actor (1922–2005)

- Michael Vale in Marathon Man 1976
- Born: June 28, 1922; New York City, U.S.
- Died: December 24, 2005 (aged 83); New York City, U.S.
- Occupation: Actor
- Years active: 1953–1997
- Known for: Fred the Baker

Michael Vale (June 28, 1922 – December 24, 2005) was an American character actor famous for being the longtime sleepy-eyed mascot Fred the Baker for donut chain Dunkin' Donuts, with his famous catchphrase "Time to make the donuts." He was featured for 15 years until he retired in 1997, having done more than 1,300 television commercials. Vale also reprised the role for commercials for the short-lived Dunkin' Donuts Cereal. He died of complications from diabetes at age 83 in Manhattan at New York-Presbyterian Hospital, and was cremated.

== Personal life ==
Growing up in Brooklyn, New York, Vale was dubbed "the actor" by his childhood friends because of his ability to imitate ballplayers and celebrities. After serving in the U.S. Army Signal Corps in Europe during World War II, he studied at the Dramatic Workshop at The New School with classmates Tony Curtis, Ben Gazzara, and Rod Steiger.

== Career ==
One of his earliest appearances was in a summer stock production of George Bernard Shaw's Androcles and the Lion. Vale later described his modest role: "I was thrown to the lions."

He was a longtime spokesman for Kraft Foods' Breakstone line of cottage cheese and sour cream products, for whom he portrayed long-suffering dairy owner "Sam Breakstone". The focus on those commercials is Sam's dedication to quality, usually with Sam having a comedic "eureka" moment on how to make a better product.

Vale appeared in several television series, including Car 54, Where Are You? in the 1960s, Kojak in the 1970s and The Cosby Show in 1987. On the big screen, he was a cab driver in A Hatful of Rain in 1957 and a jewelry salesman in Marathon Man in 1976. The actor described working with British leading man Laurence Olivier in Marathon Man as "the most wonderful experience of my life."

=== Fred the Baker ===
The first commercial ever to feature Fred the Baker, from 1981

Vale got the role of Dunkin' Donuts' Fred the Baker via a casting call. He was told that another actor was to be cast in the role of the baker, but was encouraged to come to the audition anyway in case he was needed as an extra. 300 actors participated in the casting call, including well-known character actor Lou Jacobi. Ally & Gargano creative director Ron Berger said that Vale got the role because of his likeability and believability: "Michael was 100% believable. He looked and talked and walked and breathed like he was a guy who got up at 4 a.m... Lou was good. But when it came to the final decision, Michael was the donut maker. After watching 300 people as Fred, Michael still made us laugh."

The character was so well-liked by Dunkin' Donuts customers that when the character was retired as a result of moving the advertising account from ad agency Ally & Gargano to Euro RSCG, Dunkin' Donuts surveyed its customers on how to end the character. Euro decided to explicitly acknowledge the "retirement" of Fred the Baker with a campaign that included celebrity retirees such as Bob Dole, Larry Bird, and Sugar Ray Leonard providing Fred with advice on his retirement.

On his death in 2005, Dunkin' Donuts released a statement, noting that Fred the Baker "became a beloved American icon that permeated our culture and touched millions with his sense of humor and humble nature."

== Filmography ==
Year	Title	Role	Notes
1953	Guerrilla Girl	Pavel Danov	
1957	A Hatful of Rain	Cab Driver	
1976	Marathon Man	Jewelry Salesman #2	
1977	Looking Up	Sweedler	
