= Stranger from Venus =

1954 British film by Burt Balaban

- Theatrical release poster
- Directed by: Burt Balaban
- Written by: Desmond Leslie (story); Hans Jacoby (writer)
- Produced by: Burt Balaban; Gene Martel
- Starring: Patricia Neal; Helmut Dantine; Derek Bond
- Cinematography: Kenneth Talbot
- Edited by: Peter R. Hunt
- Music by: Eric Spear
- Production company: Princess Pictures
- Distributed by: Eros Films
- Release date: 31 December 1954
- Running time: 75 minutes
- Countries: United Kingdom; United States
- Language: English

Stranger from Venus (also known as Immediate Disaster and The Venusian) is a 1954 independently made UK second feature ('B') black-and-white science fiction film, directed by Burt Balaban and starring Patricia Neal, Helmut Dantine and Derek Bond. The screenplay was by Hans Jacoby from a story by Desmond Leslie. It was produced by Balaban and Gene Martel.

== Plot ==
A flying saucer is seen in the sky above the British countryside by various eyewitnesses, including an American woman driving in her car. She crashes after being blinded by the spaceship's landing lights and deafened by its loud propulsion system. A stranger walks up to the crashed car and sees that she is badly injured.

The stranger later enters a country inn very near where the accident took place. He is able to read people's thoughts, and when asked his name, he says he has no name. Dr. Meinard, a local having a drink at the inn, introduces himself and is able to examine the stranger, and discovers that he has no pulse. The stranger also asserts that he is responsible for saving the life of a recently missing car accident victim, Susan North. She later walks into the inn a little dazed, but with her crash wounds nearly healed. After the mysterious stranger announces that he comes from the planet Venus, a guest at the inn, Arthur Walker, a high-ranking British government official (and Susan's fiancé), calls the Ministry of War to inform them of the alien's arrival. The area surrounding the inn is quickly cordoned off by the government.

Journalist Charles Dixon tries to learn more about the alien from Venus. Dixon discovers that the stranger is able to fluently speak multiple human languages, and that his civilisation has learned about humanity from listening to radio broadcasts and viewing television transmissions. He also explains how Venusians use "magnetic brilliance" to power their spaceship propulsion, supplied by the magnetic energy fields of the other planets in the Solar System, as they revolve in their various orbits.

When governmental officials arrive at the inn, the stranger from Venus outlines his purpose for coming to Earth: to prepare the way for the arrival of his superiors, who have a dire warning for humanity's leaders. Humans are developing dangerous technologies without measuring their long-term destructive consequences. Nuclear explosions create very dangerous magnetic field effects that threaten Venus and the other planets. Should fifty hydrogen bombs be exploded in the same general location in a future atomic war, they could alter the Earth's orbit, affecting its gravitational field and thus the orbits and gravity of all other planets in the Solar System. The stranger makes a promise that if Earth eliminates these dangers, Venus will share some of its higher scientific knowledge. During the meeting, however, the alien concludes that humanity is far from ready to receive such advanced knowledge and announces this conclusion to the British officials.

After his communication disc, which allows him to contact the approaching spaceship, is removed from his room by a policeman, the alien quickly realises that an interplanetary meeting of minds can never take place. The British military soon arrives and cordons off the spaceship's landing site. They turn it into a magnetic trap in order to seize the Venusian saucer for its advanced technology.

Should the government carry out this warlike action, the stranger assures Walker that an immediate retaliation from an orbiting mother ship would terminate all life in England. Walker tries to dissuade the war ministry, without success, so he acquires the stolen communication disc and returns it to the alien, who is then able to warn away the approaching spaceship so an interplanetary conflict is avoided. Discussion with all of Earth's leaders has been derailed by the British government's short-sighted greed and treachery. The future now uncertain, and his peaceful mission to Earth a failure, the stranger from Venus speaks one final time to Susan North and vanishes without a trace.

== Cast ==
- Patricia Neal as Susan North
- Helmut Dantine as The Stranger
- Derek Bond as Arthur Walker
- Cyril Luckham as Dr. Meinard
- Willoughby Gray as Tom Harding
- Marigold Russell as Gretchen Harding
- Arthur Young as Scientist
- Kenneth Edwards as Charles Dixon
- David Garth as First police officer
- Stanley Van Beers as General
- Nigel Green as second police officer
- Graham Stuart as Police Chief Richards
- John Le Mesurier as man on telephone (uncredited)
- Peter Sallis as soldier (uncredited)

== Production ==
Made at MGM Studios, Borehamwood, England. It was a low-budget remake of The Day the Earth Stood Still (1951), which also starred Patricia Neal.

== US theatrical and television releases ==
The film was released theatrically in the UK and in other countries under the titles Stranger from Venus and Immediate Disaster. In the U.S. it was only released to television by Flamingo Telefilm out of New York City under the title Immediate Disaster. This was due to a fear of legal action from 20th Century Fox, its plot being similar to Patricia Neal's earlier science fiction film The Day the Earth Stood Still, which in 1954 was still in theatrical re-release.

The film was later sold to Wade Williams Distribution, and the film was made available theatrically under the title Stranger from Venus. It has since been licensed for home video use for several decades.

== Reception ==
The Monthly Film Bulletin wrote: "With a theme reminiscent of The Day the Earth Stood Still, this is a modest and unpretentious film. Very restrained for a science fiction subject, it is, perhaps, too conscientious in its attempt to underplay the sensational incident associated with the genre; with a country inn as its main setting, it has much in common with the average photographed play, until the brief flying saucer climax, which does succeed in building up some tension even though the outcome is obvious. The setting for the action is apparently intended to be some unnamed state; but most of the characters behave so as to leave no doubt that they are Britishers. Patricia Neal, with little to do, displays considerable charm; Helmut Dantine's visiting Venusian is likeable though humourless."

Kine Weekly wrote: "The picture has an original idea but fails to compete technically with the slap-up streamlined American coloured pseudo-scientific jobs. Helmut Dantine takes his part seriously as the stranger, Patricia Neal is adequate as Susan, Derek Bond acts with polish as Arthur, and the supporting players, too, obviously have stage experience, but their easy manner and agreeable elocution are indifferent substitutes for spectacle. Grounded by dialogue, its story of flying saucers is, in short, definitely not everybody's cup of tea."

In British Sound Films: The Studio Years 1928–1959 David Quinlan rated the film as "poor", calling the film: "far-fetched and stilted."

The Radio Times Guide to Films gave the film 1/5 stars, writing: "Burt Balaban [...] adds a mere hint of American zip to the stiff upper lip atmosphere and limited public house setting. ... This is lacklustre and too restrained."

== Home media ==
Stranger from Venus was released on VHS by Englewood Entertainment. On September 5, 2000, Image Entertainment released the film on Region 1 DVD.
