= Guerrilla Girl (1953 film) =

1953 film by John Christian

- Theatreical release poster
- Directed by: John Christian
- Screenplay by: John Byrne; William Koch; William Kyriakis; Ben Parker
- Produced by: John Christian
- Starring: Helmut Dantine; Marianna; Irene Champlin; Ray Julian; Michael Vale; Charlotte Paul
- Cinematography: George Stoetzel; Charles Wecker; Sydney Zucker
- Edited by: John Christian
- Music by: Bernard Bossick
- Production company: Liberty Bell Motion Pictures Inc.
- Distributed by: United Artists
- Release date: January 23, 1953
- Running time: 82 minutes
- Country: United States
- Language: English

Guerrilla Girl is a 1953 American thriller film directed by John Christian and written by John Byrne, William Koch, William Kyriakis and Ben Parker. The film stars Helmut Dantine, Marianna, Irene Champlin, Ray Julian, Michael Vale and Charlotte Paul. It was released on January 23, 1953 by United Artists.

== Plot ==
Under the Axis occupation of Greece in World War II, two lovers resist the Nazis but become separated at the war's end. Years later, he is a Greek government official and she is on the side of the communist revolutionaries. She then finds her lover's name on an execution list.

== Cast ==
- Helmut Dantine as Demetri Alexander
- Marianna as Zaira
- Irene Champlin as Nina Christos
- Ray Julian as Comrade Vanda
- Michael Vale as Pavel Danov
- Charlotte Paul as Comrade Lakme
- Gerald Lee as Spiro
- Dora Weissman as Toula, Nina's maid
