= William Rosenberg =

American businessman (1916-2002)

- Born: June 10, 1916; Boston, Massachusetts, U.S.
- Died: September 20, 2002 (aged 86); Mashpee, Massachusetts, U.S.
- Burial place: Sharon Memorial Park; Sharon, Massachusetts
- Occupation: Entrepreneur
- Known for: Founder of Dunkin' Donuts
- Spouse(s): Bertha Greenberg (divorced); Ann Aluisy
- Children: 3

William Rosenberg (June 10, 1916 – September 20, 2002) was an American entrepreneur who founded the Dunkin' Donuts franchise in 1950 in Quincy, Massachusetts, one of the pioneers in name-brand franchising, originally named the "Open Kettle" doughnut shop when established in 1948. At the end of 2011, there were more than 10,000 outlets of the chain in 32 countries.

== Early life ==
Rosenberg was born in Boston, Massachusetts, on June 10, 1916, one of four children of Nathan Rosenberg, a grocery owner, and Phoebe Rosenberg (née Swart). Both of his parents were German-Jewish immigrants. Rosenberg grew up in Boston's working-class Dorchester neighborhood and was educated in public schools. Due to financial problems, he was forced to leave school by eighth grade to help support his family, who had lost their store during the Great Depression.

== Career ==
After several jobs, at age fourteen, he went to work for Western Union as a full-time telegram delivery boy. At seventeen, he started working for Simco, a company that distributed ice cream from refrigerated trucks, rising from delivery boy to national sales manager at age twenty-one, supervising the production, shipping, cold storage and manufacturing and managing 40 to 100 trucks.

At the start of World War II, he joined Bethlehem Steel in Hingham, Massachusetts. He later became the first Jewish trade union delegate. After the war, Rosenberg borrowed $1,000 to add to his $1,500 in war bonds and used his knowledge of food distribution to open his first company "Industrial Luncheon Services", a company that delivered meals and coffee break snacks to factory workers on the outskirts of Boston. Rosenberg created his own catering vehicles, with sides that rose to reveal sandwiches and snacks stocked on stainless steel shelves, an early predecessor to the mobile catering vehicle. Within a short time, he had 200 catering trucks, 25 in-plant outlets and a vending operation.

Noticing that forty percent of his revenues came from coffee and doughnuts, he started a retail shop that specialized in those products, opening his first coffee and doughnut shop, the "Open Kettle" on Memorial Day in 1948, later renamed "Dunkin' Donuts". Instead of the five different types of doughnuts doughnut shops traditionally offered, Rosenberg offered 52 different varieties. In 1955, upon opening his sixth shop, he decided on the concept of franchising his business as a means of distribution and expansion. In 1959, after the franchise idea had started to catch on, he lobbied at a trade show for the creation of the industry group that became the International Franchise Association in 1960.

In the early 1960s, Rosenberg founded a fast food chain, Howdy Beefburgers (later Howdy Beef n' Burger), in Massachusetts, locating many of its restaurants beside Dunkin' Donuts shops so they could share common parking lots to compete with larger chains such as McDonald's for retail space and customer draw. Howdy Beefburgers was inspired by The Howdy Doody Show that had run on television from 1947 to 1960, and even adapted Howdy Doody as its mascot. Serving such products as hamburgers, French fries, fish sandwiches and New England clam chowder, the chain had restaurants in as many as 27 locations throughout New England before dissolving toward the end of the 1970s.

In 1968, Rosenberg bought Wilrose Farm in rural East Kingston, New Hampshire. After being diagnosed with lung cancer in 1971, he was luckily able to catch the disease in time. He began devoting most of his time to the farm, becoming the largest breeder of standardbred horses in New England and was inducted into the New England Hall of Fame of the Standardbred Industry. In 1980, he donated Wilrose Farm to the University of New Hampshire, and later became involved in philanthropy, primarily benefiting hospitals.

In 2001, he published his autobiography, Time to Make the Donuts: The Founder of Dunkin Donuts Shares an American Journey, written with the help of Jessica Brilliant Keener.

== Personal life ==
Rosenberg was married twice. In 1937, he married Bertha "Bookie" Greenberg and they had three children: Bob Rosenberg, Carol Rosenberg Silverstein, and Donald "Don" Rosenberg. They later divorced. In 1978, he married Ann Aluisy of Farmington, New Hampshire.

On September 20, 2002, Rosenberg died of bladder cancer at the age of 86 in his home in Mashpee, Massachusetts.
