= Hell on Devil's Island =

1957 film by Christian Nyby

- Theatrical release poster
- Directed by: Christian Nyby
- Screenplay by: Steven Ritch
- Story by: Arndt Guisti; Ethel Guisti
- Produced by: Leon Chooluck; Laurence Stewart
- Starring: Helmut Dantine; William Talman; Donna Martell; Jean Willes; Rex Ingram; Robert Cornthwaite
- Cinematography: Ernest Haller
- Edited by: Warren Adams
- Music by: Irving Gertz
- Production company: Regal Films Inc
- Distributed by: 20th Century-Fox
- Release date: August 1957
- Running time: 73 minutes
- Country: United States
- Language: English

Hell on Devil's Island is a 1957 American adventure film directed by Christian Nyby and written by Steven Ritch. The film stars Helmut Dantine, William Talman, Donna Martell, Jean Willes, Rex Ingram and Robert Cornthwaite. The film was theatrically released in August 1957 by 20th Century-Fox.

== Plot ==
In the French Guinea prison known as Devil's Island, the ruthless commandant Bayard savagely beats Paul Rigaud and other convicts. The island's new governor, Renault, is determined to put an end to such brutality.

Efforts by the evil Bayard and his seductive accomplice Suzanne, a cafe owner, fail to keep Rigaud confined and he is released. He meets up with former cellmate Lulu and is approached by Governor Renault, who has discovered Rigaud was a newspaper editor who was imprisoned unjustly for his published opinions. Renault requests that Rigaud help him expose the prison's cruel punishments, with help from the governor's daughter, Giselle.

Suzanne agrees to betray Bayard, only to be stabbed to death by a bartender loyal to the commandant. Justice is ultimately done, however, after which Rigaud and Lulu begin personally tearing down the barriers of the prison.

== Cast ==
- Helmut Dantine as Paul Rigaud
- William Talman as Bayard
- Donna Martell as Giselle Renault
- Jean Willes as Suzanne
- Rex Ingram as Lulu
- Robert Cornthwaite as Gov. Renault
- Jay Adler as Toto
- Peter Adams as Jacques Boucher
- Edward Colmans as Jean Robert
- Mel Welles as Felix Molyneaux
- Charles Bohbot as Marcel

== Producer ==
Filming started in March 1957.
