= Fred the Baker =

American advertising character

The first commercial ever to feature Fred the Baker, from 1981

Fred the Baker was a popular advertising character portrayed by actor Michael Vale in commercials for Dunkin' Donuts from 1981 to 1997.

== Campaign ==
Fred was best known for his catchphrase "Time to make the donuts!". The commercial that introduced the phrase (which showed Fred rising well before dawn to begin making the donuts) was created by New York advertising agency Ally & Gargano and was named one of the five best commercials of the 1980s by the Television Bureau of Advertising. Fred later appeared in commercials for other products promoted by the chain, such as Dunkin Donuts Cereal, as well as new introductions such as muffins or products such as coffee, which followed the same idea: Fred getting up early to have the product freshly made every business day, then cheerfully greeting customers with fresh products. Sometimes commercials would not be about Fred's work, but rather showing the inferiority of supermarket bakeries or showing Fred waiting on modish 1980s customers while going into a black and white kitchen full of 1940s employees working to swing music, denoting quality has not changed throughout the years.

Fred the Baker was so popular with consumers that when Dunkin' Donuts decided to retire the character, the chain surveyed customers to determine the reaction to the move. Customers said Fred could leave if he were treated like an honored friend and employee. So the company created an official "retirement" celebration for him, including a parade in the city of Boston and a "free donut" day that served over six million customers on September 22, 1997.

== Legacy ==
After the death of Michael Vale in December 2005, Dunkin' Donuts ran a commercial celebrating Fred, including an "In Memory Of".

Today, the words "Time to make the donuts" are printed on the side of Dunkin' donut boxes in memory of Michael Vale/Fred the Baker.

His early commercials from 1981 are in the public domain in the United States today due to failure to comply to copyright formalities which were in place at the time. Specifically, those commercials were aired to television during 1981 without a copyright notice and were apparently never registered at the United States Copyright Office, so its copyright expired.

Shortly after his death, Dunkin' stopped making their donuts in-store, and they are now trucked in at most locations, with a few remaining as central manufacturing locations (CML).
