= Helmut Dantine =

Austrian actor

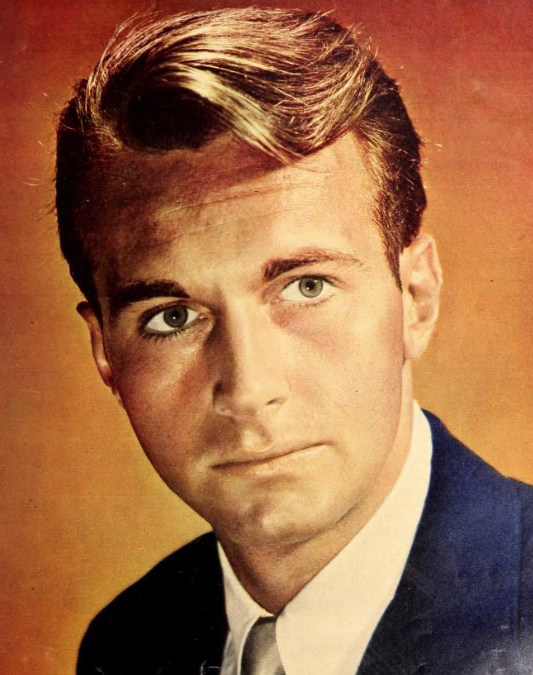
- Dantine pictured in 1946
- Born: Helmut Guttmann; 7 October 1918; Vienna, Austria
- Died: 2 May 1982 (aged 63); Beverly Hills, California, U.S.
- Education: UCLA
- Occupation: Actor
- Years active: 1940–1979
- Spouses: Gwen Anderson (m. 19??; div. 1943); Charlene Stafford Wrightsman (m. 1947; div. 1950) Nicola "Niki" Schenck (m. 1958; div. 1971)
- Children: 4

Helmut Dantine (7 October 1918 – 2 May 1982) was an Austrian-American actor who often played Nazis in thriller films of the 1940s. His best-known performances are perhaps the German pilot in Mrs. Miniver and the desperate Bulgarian refugee in Casablanca, who tries gambling to obtain travel visa money for himself and his wife. As his acting career waned, he turned to producing.

According to one obituary, "He specialized in portrayals of Nazis, sometimes as the handsome but icy SS sadist battling Allied heroes, sometimes as a sympathetic German soldier forced, against his better judgment, to fight".

== Early life ==
Dantine's father, Alfred Guttmann, was the head of the Austrian railway system in Vienna. As a young man, Dantine became involved in Vienna's anti-Nazi movement. In 1938, when he was 19 years old, the Nazis took over Austria during the Anschluss. Dantine was rounded up with hundreds of other opponents of the Third Reich and imprisoned in a Nazi concentration camp outside Vienna.

Three months later, using their influence, his parents obtained his release and immediately sent him to California to live with a friend. His father later died in Austria. His mother, Ditha Guttman, was safely brought to the U.S. in 1960 by her son to live in California. Ditha lived there until her death in 1983.

== Film career ==
Dantine enrolled at the University of California, Los Angeles. His relatives thought he would go into business, but he became interested in theater. He began his U.S. acting career at the Pasadena Playhouse, while running two gas stations in order to pay his expenses. Dantine was spotted by a talent scout from Warner Bros, who signed him to a contract.

=== Warner Bros. ===
Dantine had uncredited parts in International Squadron (1942) and To Be or Not to Be (1942), before his first credited role in MGM's Mrs. Miniver (1942), playing a downed German pilot captured by the title character (played by Greer Garson). It was a huge hit, and Dantine received much positive attention from being in the film.

In August 1942, Warners signed him to a new acting contract. The studio kept him busy with roles in the World War II films, The Pied Piper (1942), Desperate Journey (1942) fighting Errol Flynn, and The Navy Comes Through (1942).

He had a sympathetic role in Casablanca (1942), as a young refugee trying and failing to earn money via gambling in order to purchase travel visas for him and his wife; he is helped by Humphrey Bogart. Warners began to give Dantine more sizeable roles in their "A" films, Watch on the Rhine (1943), Edge of Darkness (1943), playing a Nazi officer, again fighting Errol Flynn, and Mission to Moscow (1943), playing a sympathetic Russian.

Dantine's good looks caused him to receive a lot of fan mail and, in the words of one profile, "the studio began to realize it had something else besides a Hollywood Hitlerite on its hands." Warners announced they had bought Night Action by Norman Krasna as a vehicle for Dantine, but the film appears not to have been made. Instead, he had a large role playing the villain in Northern Pursuit (1943), as a Nazi running loose in northern Canada fighting Errol Flynn again.

Warner Bros. later cast him in a sympathetic role in Passage to Marseille (1944), and he was one of several stars in Hollywood Canteen (1944). In 1944, exhibitors voting for "Stars of Tomorrow" picked Dantine at number 10.

Warners gave him a sympathetic lead in Hotel Berlin (1945) as the leader of the German underground. He was once again a Nazi on-the-run in Escape in the Desert (1945), considered to be a remake of The Petrified Forest. His last role for Warners was in the film noir Shadow of a Woman (1946). He then left the studio.

=== Freelancer ===
Dantine was the lead in another film noir Whispering City (1947) for Eagle-Lion Films.

In 1947, he co-starred with Tallulah Bankhead in the Broadway play The Eagle Has Two Heads, replacing Marlon Brando. According to Jean Cocteau, Bankhead made alterations to the play, and the production was a flop, lasting only 29 performances.

Dantine was in No Time for Comedy on stage in Washington and also performed in the 1950 Broadway play Parisienne. He was also in Arms and the Man at Cambridge Summer Playhouse.

Dantine starred in the live but short-lived television series Shadow of the Cloak during the 1951–52 season. He had the lead in a B-movie, Guerrilla Girl (1953), then had a small role in the musical, Call Me Madam (1953), He was supported by Patricia Neal while starring in the British science fiction film Stranger from Venus (1953).

Dantine acted in the 1956 film production of Tolstoy's War and Peace as Dolokhov, a Cossack officer assigned to harrying the retreat of France's Napoleonic army from Moscow. He also had a small role in Alexander the Great (1956), Kean: Genius or Scoundrel (1957), and The Story of Mankind (1957). He played the lead role in Hell on Devil's Island (1957).

Dantine directed the 1958 military aviation film Thundering Jets, starring Rex Reason, and continued to act in the films Fräulein (1958) and Tempest (1958).

=== Producing ===
As his acting career wound down, he became a vice-president of Hollywood mogul Joseph Schenck's company, Schenck Enterprises, in 1959; Schenck was his wife's uncle.

He later went to work as producer with Robert L. Lippert Productions and then as president of Hand Enterprises Inc.

Among Dantine's later screen appearances, there were three films for which he was the executive producer: Bring Me the Head of Alfredo Garcia (1974) and The Killer Elite (1975), both directed by Sam Peckinpah, and The Wilby Conspiracy (1975). He was also in The Fifth Musketeer (1979) and Tarzan the Ape Man (1981).

== Personal life ==
Before graduating from UCLA, he married fellow theater student Gwen Anderson; they divorced in 1943.

In 1943, he was in a car accident and accused of hit-and-run. In January 1945 he was arrested for biting Ida Lupino's assistant on the arm during a New Year's Eve party; after apologizing to the assistant, he was released.

He became an American citizen in April 1944.

In 1947, he married Charlene Stafford Wrightsman (1927–1963), the younger daughter of Charles Bierer Wrightsman, an oil millionaire whose collection of French furniture and decorative arts fills several galleries at the Metropolitan Museum of Art. The couple had a son, Dana Wrightsman Dantine, before divorcing in 1950. His ex-wife claimed Dantine was after her father's money.

In 1958, Dantine married Nicola Schenck, daughter of Nicholas Schenck, one of the founders of Loews. His wife acted under the name Niki Dantine; the couple had three children: Dita, Nicola, and Shelley. In 1971, Helmut and Niki were divorced.

== Death ==
On 2 May 1982, Helmut Dantine died in Beverly Hills of a heart attack at age 63.

== Partial filmography ==
- Escape (1940) – Porter (uncredited)
- International Squadron (1941) – Flyer (uncredited)
- To Be or Not to Be (1942) – Co-Pilot (uncredited)
- Mrs. Miniver (1942) – German Flyer
- The Pied Piper (1942) – Aide
- Desperate Journey (1942) – German Co-Pilot (uncredited)
- The Navy Comes Through (1942) – Frightened Young German Seaman (uncredited)
- Casablanca (1942) – Jan Brandel (uncredited)
- Edge of Darkness (1943) – Captain Koenig
- Mission to Moscow (1943) – Maj. Kamenev
- Watch on the Rhine (1943) – Young Man
- Northern Pursuit (1943) – Col. Hugo von Keller
- Passage to Marseille (1944) – Garou
- Hollywood Canteen (1944) – Helmut Dantine
- Hotel Berlin (1945) – Dr. Martin Richter
- Escape in the Desert (1945) – Capt. Becker
- Shadow of a Woman (1946) – Dr. Eric Ryder
- Whispering City (1947) – Michel Lacoste
- Guerrilla Girl (1953) – Demetri Alexander
- Call Me Madam (1953) – Prince Hugo
- Stranger from Venus (1954) – The Stranger
- Alexander the Great (1956) – Nectenabus
- War and Peace (1956) – Dolokhov
- Kean: Genius or Scoundrel (1956) – Lord Mewill
- Hell on Devil's Island (1957) – Paul Rigaud
- The Story of Mankind (1957) – Marc Antony
- Fräulein (1958) – Lt. Hugo Von Metzler
- Tempest (1958) – Svabrin
- Operation Crossbow (1965) – General Linz
- Bring Me the Head of Alfredo Garcia (1974) – Max
- The Wilby Conspiracy (1975) – Prosecuting Counsel
- The Killer Elite (1975) – Vorodny
- The Fifth Musketeer (1979) – Spanish Ambassador (final film role)
