= Dunkin' Donuts =

American multinational food company

- Logo used since October 2022

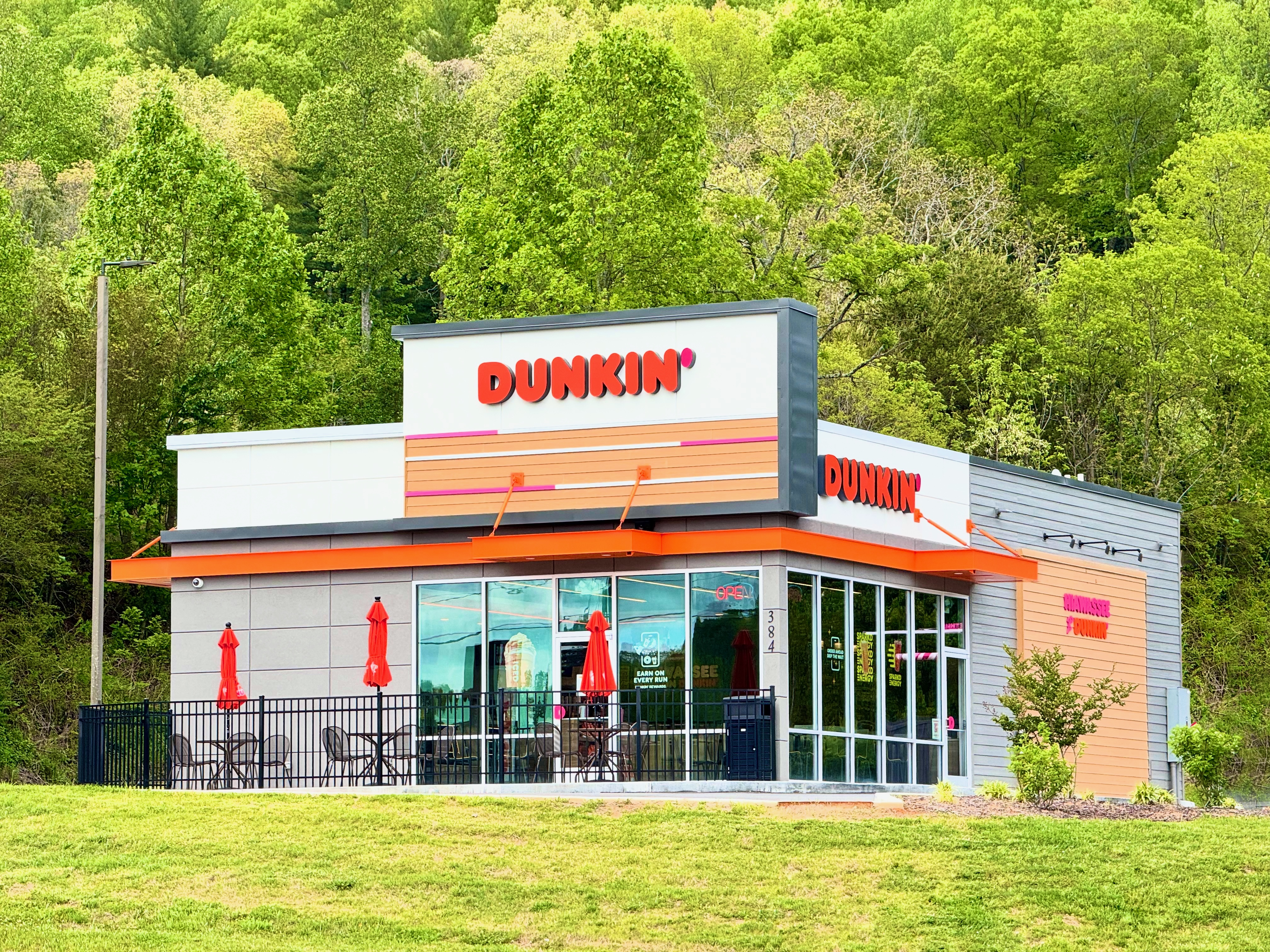
- Dunkin' in Hiawassee, Georgia
- Trade name: Dunkin'
- Type: Subsidiary
- Industry: Restaurant
- Genre: Coffeehouse; Doughnut shop
- Founded: May 20, 1950 (76 years ago) (Note: Opened as Open Kettle in 1948 (78 years ago))
- Founder: Bill Rosenberg
- Headquarters: Canton, Massachusetts, United States
- Number of locations: 14,200+ (2026)
- Areas served: List: Austria; Bahamas; Bahrain; Belgium; Brazil; Canada; Chile; Colombia; Costa Rica; Denmark; Ecuador; Egypt; France; Georgia; Germany; Guatemala; Honduras; Indonesia; Kuwait; Lebanon; Malaysia; Mexico; Morocco; Netherlands; New Zealand; Oman; Pakistan; Peru; Philippines; Qatar; Saudi Arabia; Singapore; South Korea; Spain; Switzerland; Thailand; United Arab Emirates; United Kingdom; United States
- Key people: Paul J. Brown
- Products: Baked goods; Coffee beans; Coffee grounds; Frozen beverages; Hot beverages; Iced beverages; Sandwiches; Soft drinks
- Parent: Inspire Brands
- Website: dunkindonuts.com

Dunkin' LLC, formerly known as Dunkin' Donuts, is an American multinational fast-food restaurant chain specializing in coffee and doughnuts. It was founded by Bill Rosenberg in Quincy, Massachusetts, in 1950.

With approximately 14,200 locations in 39 countries and $14.5 billion in system sales, Dunkin' is one of the largest coffee shop and doughnut shop chains in the world. In addition to several varieties of coffee and doughnuts, products sold include bagels, breakfast sandwiches, muffins, and doughnut holes branded as Munchkins.

The chain was acquired by Baskin-Robbins' holding company Allied Lyons in 1990. Its acquisition of the Mister Donut chain and the conversion of that chain to Dunkin' Donuts facilitated the brand's growth in North America the same year.

Dunkin' and Baskin-Robbins eventually became subsidiaries of Dunkin' Brands, headquartered in Canton, Massachusetts, in 2004. Dunkin' Brands was purchased by Inspire Brands on December 15, 2020. The chain began rebranding as a "beverage-led company", and was renamed Dunkin' in January 2019. While stores in the U.S. began using the new name, the company intends to roll out the rebranding to all of its international locations.

== History ==
=== 1948–1963: Founding years ===
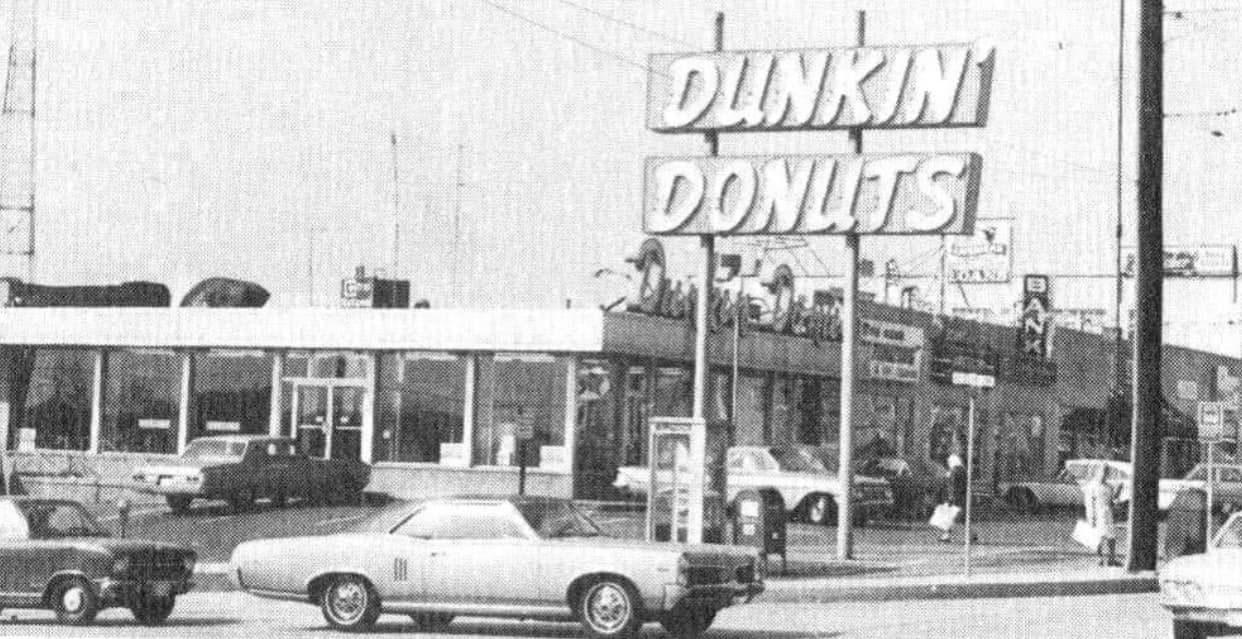
A Dunkin' Donuts store in Wheaton, Maryland c. 1967; the restaurant is still there operating today.

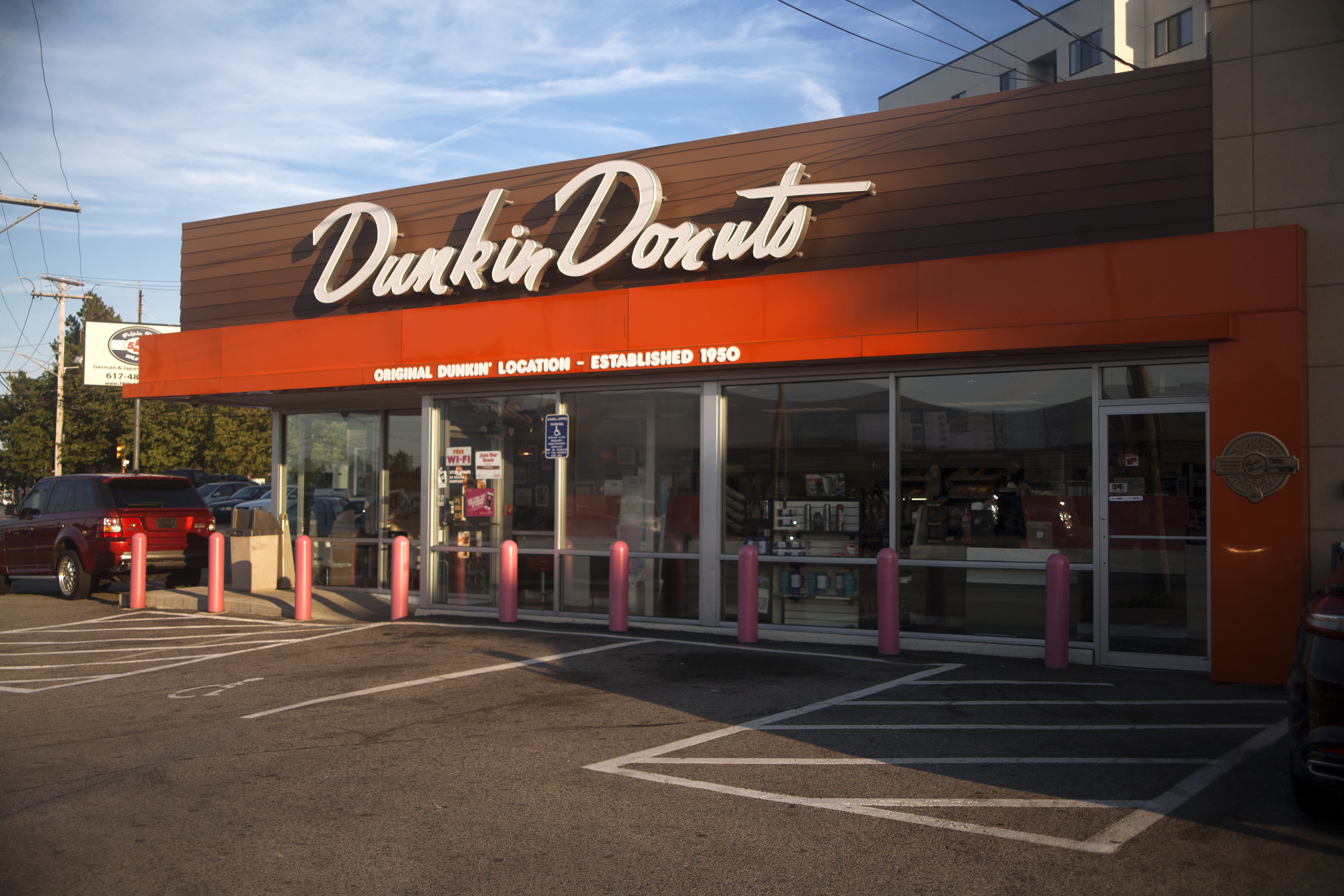
The original Dunkin' Donuts in Quincy, Massachusetts, after its renovation in the 2000s

Bill Rosenberg opened the Open Kettle in 1948, a restaurant selling doughnuts and coffee in Quincy, Massachusetts (a suburb of Boston), but in late May 1950, he changed the name to Dunkin' Donuts after discussions with company executives. He conceived the idea for the restaurant after his experiences selling food in factories and at construction sites, where doughnuts and coffee were the two most popular items. The company introduced its first logo in 1953, and the mascot Dunkie in 1954. The restaurant was successful, and Rosenberg sold franchises to others starting in 1955. It was during this time that Johnny Spartos, one of the men running the original Quincy location, convinced Rosenberg to produce a donut with a handle specifically for dunking into a cup of coffee.

=== 1963–1998: Bob Rosenberg ===
In 1963, Rosenberg's son Bob became CEO of the company at age 25, and Dunkin' Donuts opened its hundredth location that year. Dunkin' Donuts was a subsidiary of Universal Food Systems at the time, a conglomerate of 10 small food-service businesses, and Dunkin' Donuts locations varied greatly in their menu options, with some selling full breakfasts and others serving only doughnuts and coffee.

In the following years, the other businesses in the Universal Food Systems portfolio were sold or closed, and the company was renamed to Dunkin' Donuts. The menu and shop format was standardized, and various new menu items were introduced. In the early 1980s, counter service and ceramic coffee cups were replaced by self-service counters and paper cups. The chain went public in 1968 and was acquired by Baskin-Robbins owner Allied Lyons in 1990.

Dunkin' Donuts expanded in the 1990s by buying out two rival chains: Mister Donut (which was founded by Bill Rosenberg's former partner Harry Winokur) and Dawn Donuts.

=== 1998–present: After Bob Rosenberg ===
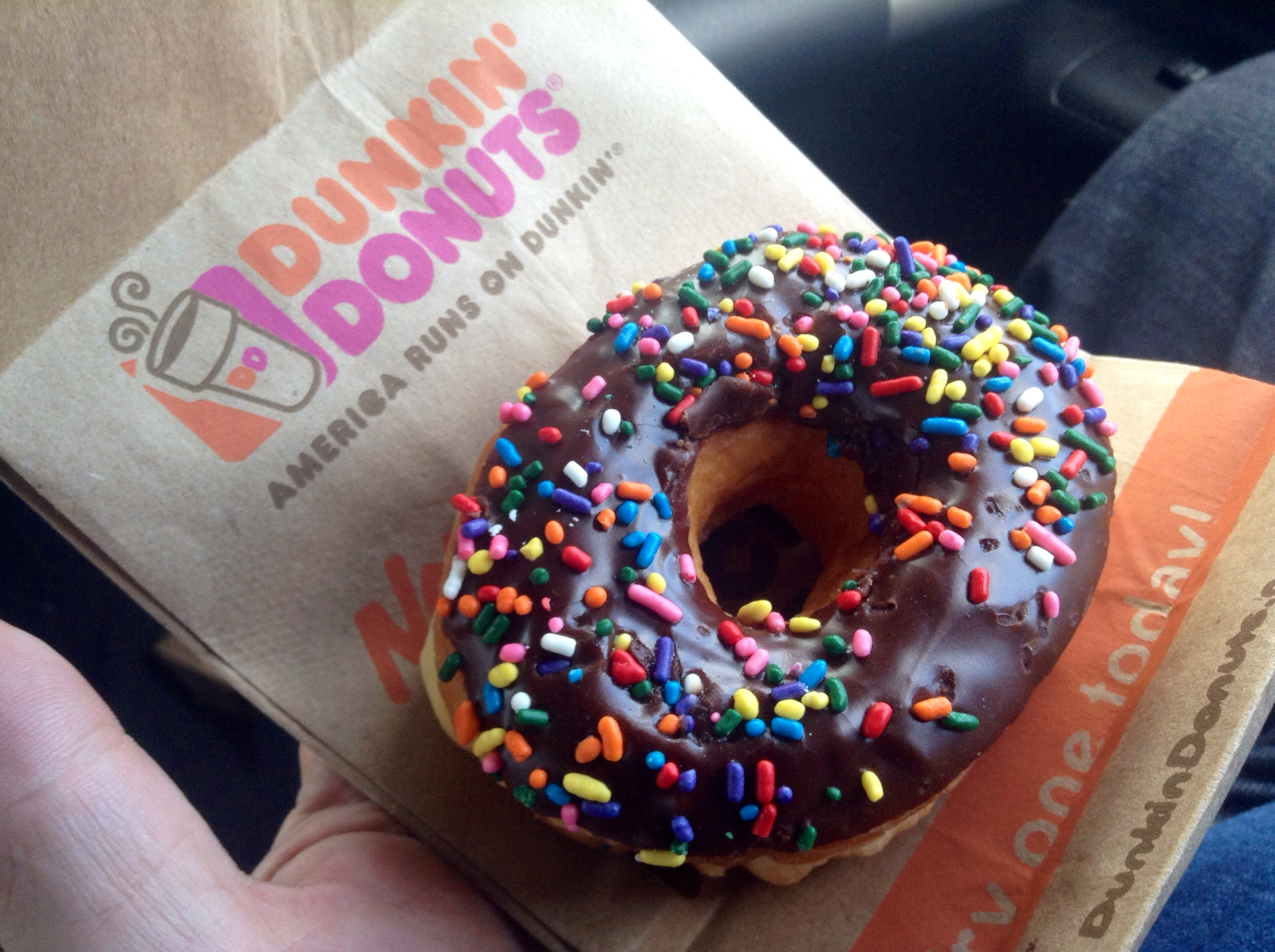
A Dunkin' Donuts donut

The 'Dunkin' Donut' with a handle fashioned on it was discontinued in 2003 (except in Singapore) because it was hand-cut and uneconomical compared to machine-cut doughnuts.

In 2004, the company's headquarters were relocated to Canton, Massachusetts. In December 2005, Dunkin' Donuts and Baskin-Robbins (by then, operating under the name Dunkin' Brands) were sold to a private equity consortium of Bain Capital, Carlyle Group, and Thomas H. Lee Partners for $2.4 billion. By 2010, Dunkin' Donuts' global sales were $6 billion.

In June 2013, Dunkin' Donuts unveiled a new store design, the brand's first in almost seven years.

The Dunkin' Donuts location in Natick, Massachusetts launched a program to test the concept of curbside pickup in December 2016.

In January 2018, Dunkin' Donuts started opening new concept locations, beginning in Quincy, featuring modern decor, cold beverages on tap and a single-cup brewing machine, more packaged takeout options, and dedicated pick-up lines for mobile ordering inside and in the drive-thru. The concept was described as being part of a shift towards becoming an "on-the-go, beverage-led brand". In addition, the location, as well as others, began to trial signage referring to the chain as simply "Dunkin'"—removing "Donuts" from the name.

In February 2018, Dunkin' announced plans to phase out polystyrene foam cups globally for environmental purposes by April 2020.

In July 2018, Dave Hoffmann took over from Nigel Travis to become the CEO. His stated goal for the company was to add 1,000 new locations outside of the Northeastern United States by the end of 2020 and to have a revenue increase of 3 percent for stores open a year or longer. In late 2018, Dunkin' installed espresso machines at all possible locations and launched espresso products using a new recipe.

In June 2019, Dunkin' partnered with Grubhub to begin the rollout of its new Dunkin' Delivers service. Later in July 2019, Dunkin' partnered with Beyond Meat to introduce a meatless breakfast sandwich in Manhattan, becoming the first U.S. restaurant brand to serve Beyond Sausage. The sandwich launched nationally later in 2019.

In September 2019, the New York attorney general's office alleged in a lawsuit that Dunkin' mishandled a series of cyberattacks that were directed at customers using the Dunkin' mobile app. These attacks took place in early 2015 and thousands of usernames and passwords were stolen. The state lawsuit alleges that Dunkin' employees knew about these attacks, but failed to take appropriate action.

In October 2020, Dunkin' Brands stated that the company was in conversation with Inspire Brands, a private equity-backed company, negotiating to sell the company. They agreed to a deal that was announced on Saturday, October 31, 2020. Inspire Brands bought Dunkin' Brands for $11.3 billion, which included Dunkin' Brands' debt that Inspire Brands would be paying off. Inspire paid $106.50 in cash for each of Dunkin' Brands' shares. On December 15, 2020, the acquisition was completed, and Dunkin' Brands ceased to exist as a separate company, with Dunkin', Baskin-Robbins, and the trademark management of Mister Donut, becoming part of Inspire Brands.

In May 2026, Dunkin' current parent company Inspire Brands signed a franchise agreement with Montreal-based holding company Foodtastic to bring the restaurant chain back to Canada eight years after the company ceased its operations in the North. Peter Mammas, the president and CEO of restaurant holding company Foodtastic said its return this time will be different, and that this time the chain’s focus will be on Canadian ownership. Mammas expects the first Dunkin’ cafes to open in Canada later this year. A year from now, he says the company will likely be able to open a cafe a week, and about 50 cafes a year. “We have boots on the ground, so we’re going to have local support to support the franchises,” he said. He also said the company will concentrate on opening stores in Quebec and Ontario for the first two years before opening cafes in the Maritimes and the West Coast.

== Marketing ==
The first commercial ever to feature Fred the Baker, from 1981

Dunkin' Donuts' "It's Worth the Trip" campaign starred sleepy-eyed "Fred the Baker" and featured the catchphrase "Time to make the donuts”. It won honors from the Television Bureau of Advertising as one of the five best television advertisements of the 1980s. Fred the Baker was played by actor Michael Vale for 16 years until his retirement in 1997. The catchphrase was used in the title of founder William Rosenberg's autobiography Time to Make the Donuts: The Founder of Dunkin' Donuts Shares an American Journey.

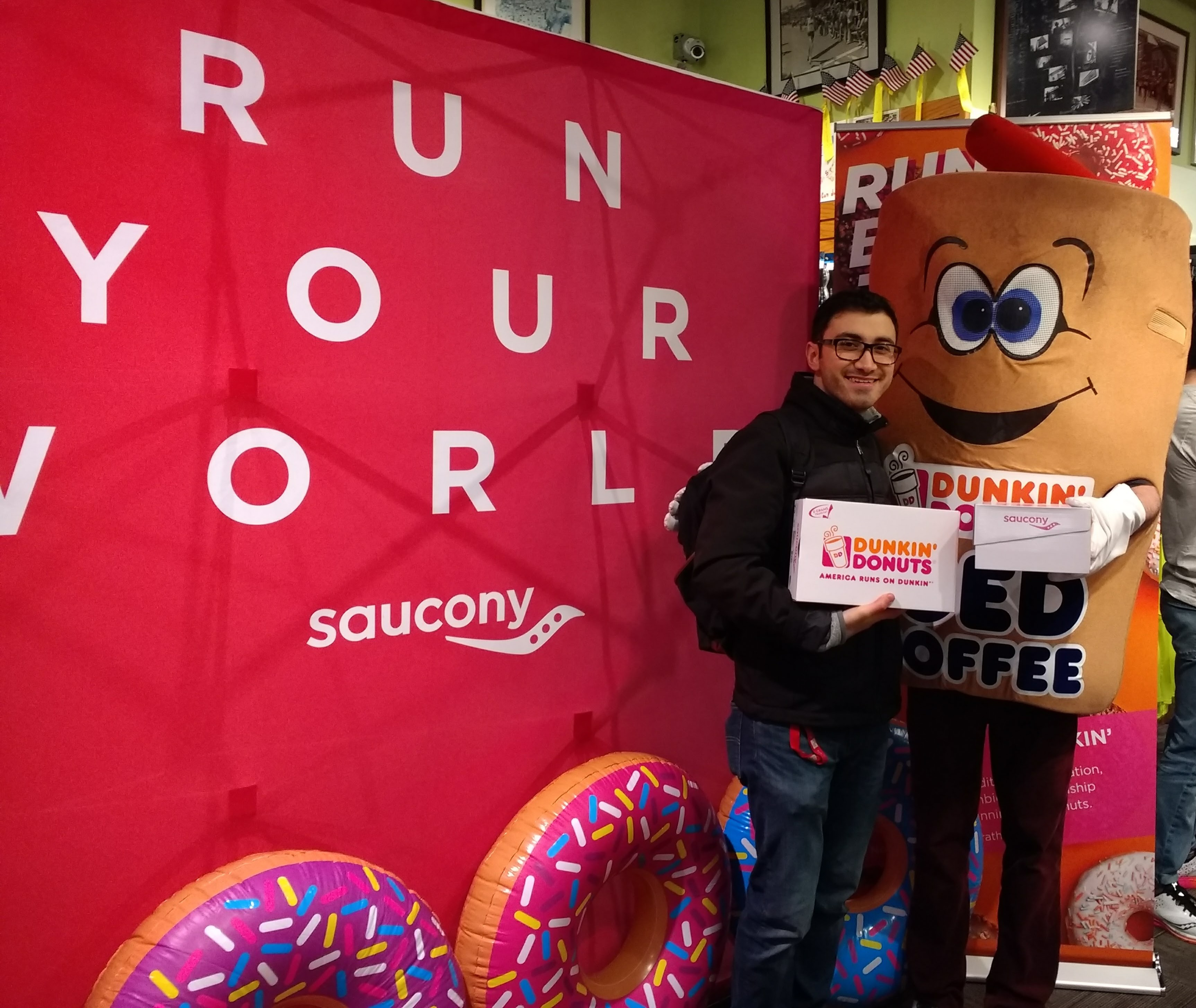
Launch party of the co-branded Saucony X Dunkin’ Kinvara 9 running shoe, 2018

Dunkin' Donuts changed its slogan in March 2006 to "America Runs on Dunkin'". They Might Be Giants songs were featured in a series of advertisements of new products to boost summer sales. In 2006, a series of Dunkin' Donuts commercials referred to the fictional language "Fritalian". "Is it French? Or is it Italian?" sings a chorus of customers facing a long menu of non-English terms. "Perhaps Fritalian?" was created by Hill Holliday to "poke fun at pretentious Starbucks-style coffee chains, with patrons attempting to order hard-to-pronounce lattes." The commercial was interpreted as a deliberate mocking of Starbucks. The commercials' punchline is: "Delicious lattes from Dunkin' Donuts. You order them in English." It has been a point of discussion that latte, cappuccino, and espresso are loanwords from Italian which have no equivalence in English. The commercials, however, refer to the Starbucks ordering language itself, poking fun at words such as grande and venti. Further commercials in 2007 more directly mocked Starbucks, with a customer ordering a "large" and being chastised to use the term "dieci".

Rachael Ray starred in commercials for Dunkin' Donuts beginning in 2007. In May 2008, Dunkin' Donuts removed an online advertisement featuring Ray wearing a fringed black-and-white scarf, following criticism from commentator Michelle Malkin and others who claimed the garment resembled a keffiyeh and symbolized support for terrorism. Dunkin' Donuts pulled that commercial off the air, leading to criticism of the company pertaining to special interests.

In March 2009, the company unveiled the alternate slogan "You 'Kin Do It!" and launched a $100 million ad campaign promotion. In 2017, the company announced that it would begin testing the name of simply "Dunkin'" at some retail locations, as they would like to be thought of as a destination for coffee, its most profitable product. The branding would be implemented in other locations in the latter half of 2018 if it was successful. The brand announced that it would be known simply as Dunkin' in September 2018.

In April 2018, Dunkin' Donuts teamed up with the Massachusetts shoe manufacturer, Saucony, to produce a strawberry-frosted doughnut themed running shoe to commemorate the 122nd running of the Boston Marathon. The Saucony X Dunkin' Kinvara 9 came in a doughnut box and the heel of the shoe was covered in rainbow sprinkles.

The chain is a favorite among celebrities. Ben Affleck began starring in commercials for the company along with his then-wife Jennifer Lopez in February 2023. The first aired during Super Bowl LVII. They starred in a follow up that first aired during Super Bowl LVIII, along with Affleck's long-time friend, Matt Damon, and former NFL star Tom Brady. The chain then announced it would add Affleck's specific order, an iced coffee with cream, sweet cold foam, and cinnamon sugar, via its limited-time DunKings Menu.

On July 29, 2025, Dunkin' launched a campaign dubbed the "King of Summer", featuring actor Gavin Casalegno advertising its fruit-flavored Summer Refreshers. Reception to the advertisement was mixed, as some social media users thought its mention of genetics evoked eugenicist ideas. The Dunkin' campaign launched less than a week after American Eagle launched its campaign "Sydney Sweeney Has Great Jeans", which led to similar backlash.

On February 8, 2026, during Super Bowl LX, Ben Affleck appeared in a commercial that parodies Good Will Hunting, a film that Affleck co-wrote and starred in, as a 1990s sitcom. He portrays "Will Dunkin'" a parody of Damon's character, "Will Hunting", where he's cast alongside 1990s sitcom stars such as Jason Alexander, Jennifer Aniston, Jasmine Guy, Alfonso Ribeiro, Matt LeBlanc, and Jaleel White. Tom Brady also appears in the commercial.

=== Logo ===
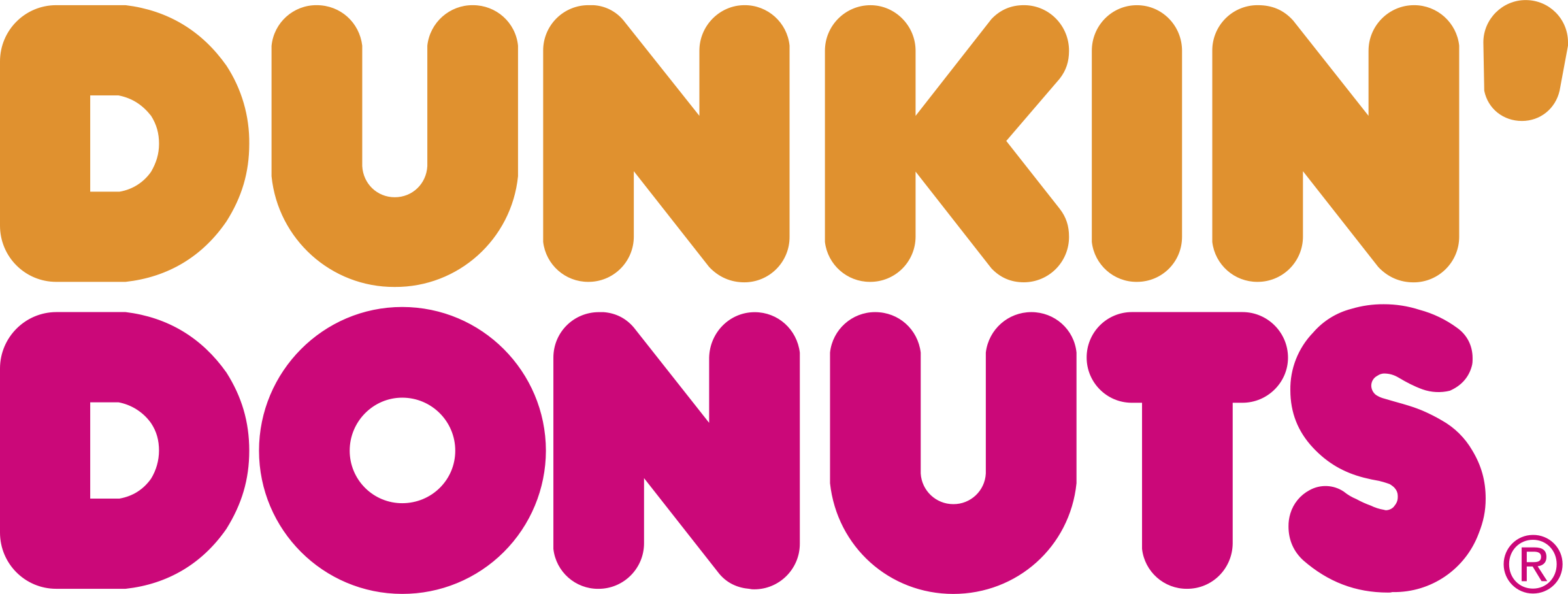
Former wordmark

A script version of the words Dunkin' Donuts was filed on March 31, 1955, and registered on February 2, 1960. A later logo was for a drawing and word logo depicting a figure with a doughnut for a head and a coffee cup and doughnut body wearing a garrison cap, with Dunkin' emblazoned on both the coffee cup and cap. The design was rendered primarily in yellow and brown. The logo was applied for on June 23, 1958, registered on May 23, 1961, and put into use on July 1, 1964.

In 1966, the company began using a hot pink color for its branding and used a logo showing a stylized coffee cup with the company's name rendered on one line as a circle, evoking a doughnut dunking into the cup. In 1980, bright orange was added to the hot pink. As of 2014, the logo was a variation of the logo that has been in use since 1980: an all-capitals rendering of the words Dunkin' Donuts (Dunkin' in orange, Donuts in pink) in a thick, Frankfurter typeface with a coffee cup outlined in brown with a "DD" monogram.

In September 2018, the company announced that it would shorten its name to Dunkin', with a wider roll out beginning in January 2019. The company acknowledged "Dunkin'" was already a common name for the chain among customers and in its marketing (including the slogan "America Runs on Dunkin'"), and that the rebranding would reflect the chain's continuing shift towards being a "beverage-led" brand at a time when consumers have shown a preference for healthier trends and options as they eat fewer doughnuts. While stores in the U.S. started using the new name in 2019, the company intends to roll out the rebranding to all of its international locations.

=== Primary ad agency ===
In April 2018, Dunkin' named BBDO as their primary advertising agency. This replaced Hill Holliday, which had been producing print, digital, broadcast, and billboard advertising for almost twenty years. Hill Holliday was the agency responsible for the tagline "America Runs on Dunkin'". ARC/Leo Burnett was also named to lead all in-store promotions.

=== Affiliations ===
Dunkin' has a close relationship with the Boston Red Sox and the New England Patriots, making commercials at the start of each team's season for promotions. Dunkin' also sponsors other professional sports teams, including the Dallas Cowboys, New York Yankees, New York Mets, Philadelphia Eagles, and Tampa Bay Rays.

In 2001, Dunkin' Donuts purchased the naming rights for the former Providence Civic Center, and renamed it the Dunkin' Donuts Center. In 2022, the arena was renamed the Amica Mutual Pavilion. The center is the home for the NCAA and Big East Providence Friars men's basketball team from Providence College as well as the home for the AHL Providence Bruins hockey team. In reference to the center's long association with local college basketball, it is often known locally as "The Dunk".

In January 2014, English football club Liverpool announced a multimillion-pound global partnership with the company.

Dunkin' Donuts signed a sponsorship deal with the National Women's Hockey League in December 2015. As part of the multi-year agreement, Dunkin’ Donuts is the official hot, iced and frozen coffee of the NWHL.

In 2016, Dunkin' became the official "coffee, doughnut and breakfast sandwich partner" of the National Hockey League.

== Philanthropy ==
The Dunkin' Joy in Childhood Foundation is an independent 501(c)3 charitable organization founded in 2006 to provide the simple joys of childhood to kids battling hunger or illness. The Foundation partners with food banks, children's hospitals, and nonprofit organizations to fund joyful environments and experiences for children across the country. Since its founding, the Foundation has granted more than $70 million to hundreds of national and local charities.

Kari Bornhorst McHugh served as Executive Director from March 2017 to August 2021. In December 2018, McHugh launched the Dogs for Joy program, the first initiative of its scale to place full-time specially trained facility dogs in children's hospitals nationwide, backed by more than $2 million in initial grants. As part of the launch, McHugh brought in Cooper Dunkin', a Black Lab/Golden Retriever mix trained by Canine Assistants, who served as the Foundation's Chief Joy Officer and program ambassador, visiting children's hospitals across the country.

In 2020, the Foundation launched Joyful Spaces, a program funding the creation and renovation of playgrounds, healing gardens, and play spaces at children's hospitals.

Also during the COVID-19 pandemic, the Foundation introduced Hero Recharge, created in partnership with outdoor adventure nonprofit First Descents to support healthcare workers, which received an honorable mention in the Corporate Social Responsibility category of Fast Company's 2021 World Changing Ideas Awards.

== Locations ==
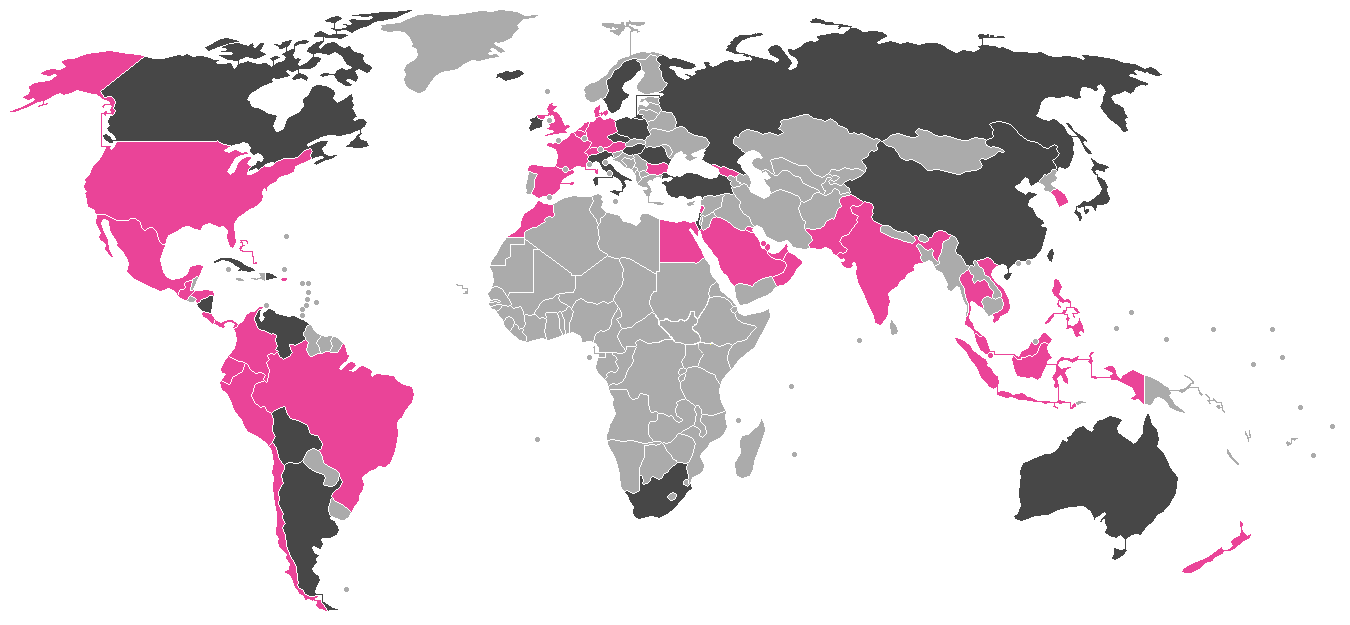
Countries with Dunkin' Donuts locations Current locations Former locations

- Austria
- Bahamas
- Bahrain
- Belgium
- Brazil
- Canada
- Chile
- Colombia
- Costa Rica
- Denmark
- Ecuador
- Egypt
- France
- Georgia
- Germany
- Guatemala
- Honduras
- India
- Indonesia
- Kuwait
- Lebanon
- Malaysia
- Mexico
- Morocco
- Netherlands
- New Zealand
- Oman
- Pakistan
- Peru
- Philippines
- Qatar
- Saudi Arabia
- Singapore
- South Korea
- Spain
- Switzerland
- Thailand
- United Arab Emirates
- United Kingdom
- United States

=== Headquarters ===
Dunkin’ Corporate Office is Located in Canton, Massachusetts. Its former headquarters was built in Quincy, Massachusetts in 1950.

=== United States ===
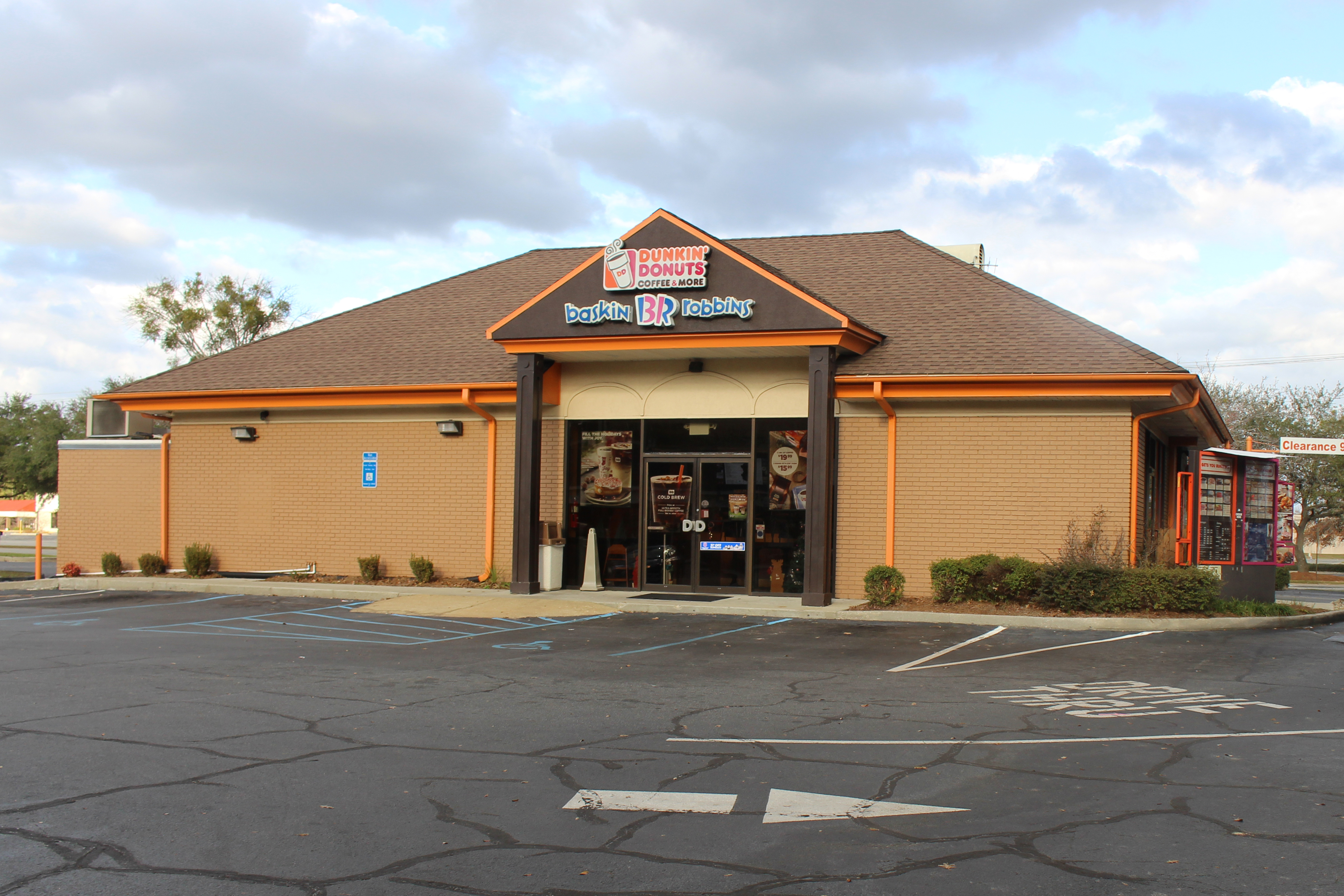
Co-branded Dunkin' Donuts and Baskin-Robbins, Thomasville, Georgia

On January 16, 2013, Nigel Travis, Dunkin' Brands CEO, announced that the Dunkin' Donuts franchises would be available for the first time in California beginning in 2015 although in reality, this was a return to California, as the company had several stores operating in the state up until 2002. In July 2013, Dunkin' Donuts announced that it signed its first Southern California multi-unit store development agreements with four franchise groups for a total commitment of 45 new restaurants. The first standalone restaurants were expected to open in 2015 in Orange and Los Angeles counties. The chain also planned to expand into more stores in Texas by 2015.

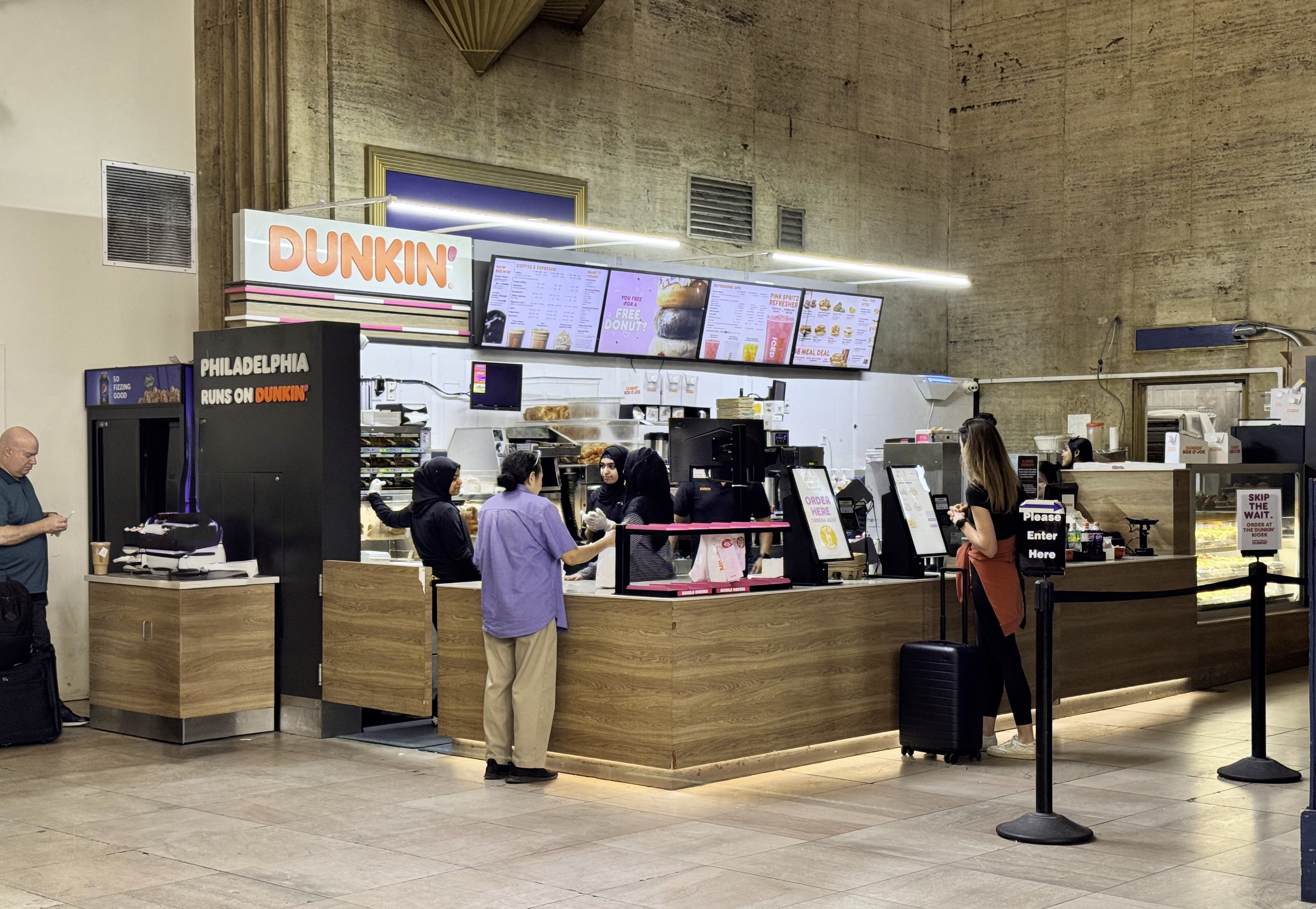
The interior of a Dunkin' location at 30th Street Station in Philadelphia

On March 10, 2014, the first Dunkin' Donuts/Baskin-Robbins combination store in Southern California opened in Ramona. This is Dunkin' Donuts' third California shop to open, following shops in Barstow and on Camp Pendleton. Since March 2014, Dunkin' Donuts has opened several additional locations throughout California, including the Los Angeles area. Dunkin' Donuts shops opened in the San Francisco Bay Area in Walnut Creek, Half Moon Bay, and American Canyon in 2016, as well as South San Francisco and Fremont, in 2017.

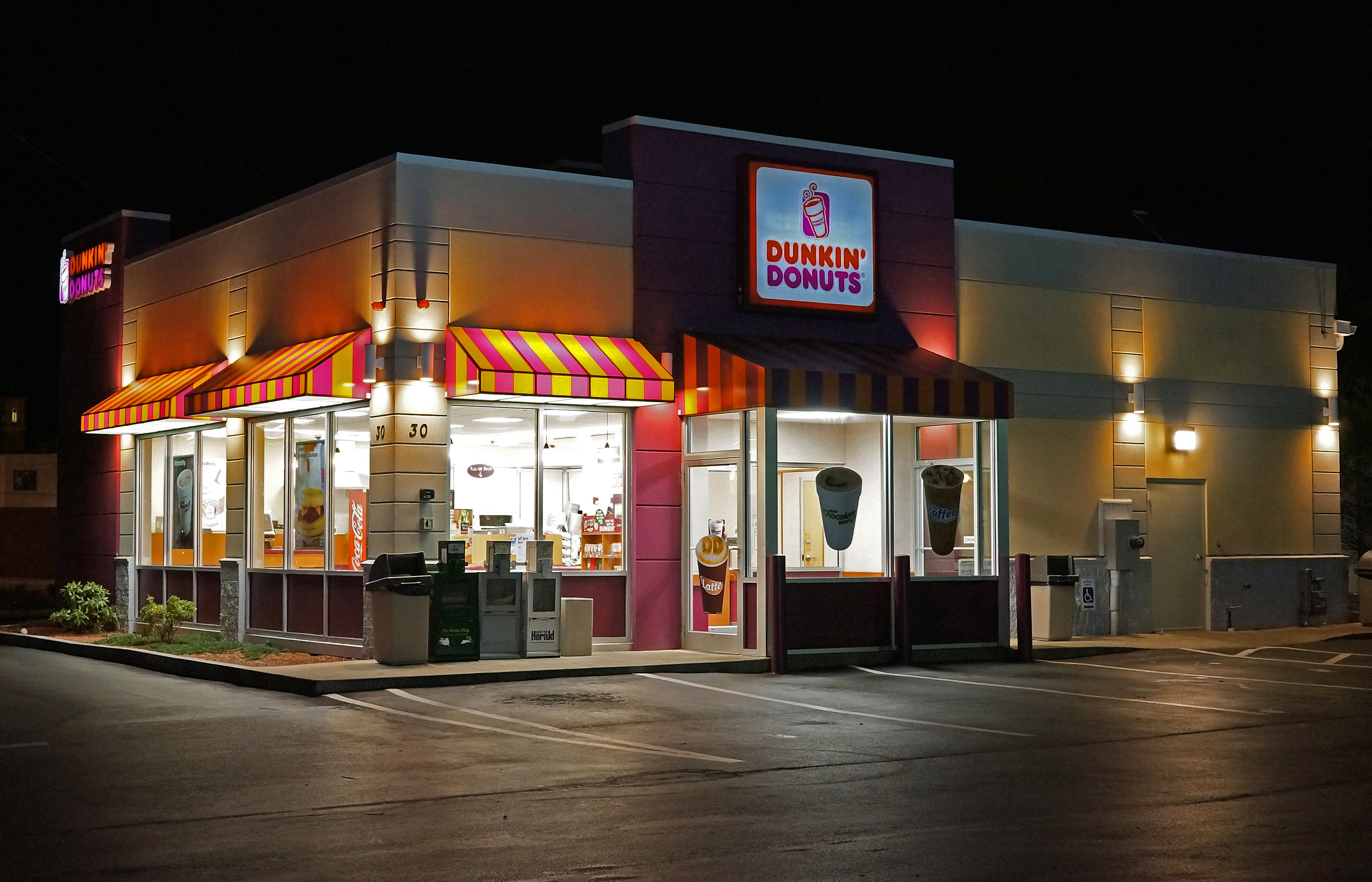
Dunkin' in Revere, Massachusetts

After nearly a decade's absence, Dunkin' Donuts returned to the state of Minnesota in 2014; a new shop opened inside the Kahler Grand Hotel in Rochester.

In the United States, Dunkin' is sometimes paired with Baskin-Robbins ice cream in a single multibranded store. While such locations usually maintain separate counters for each chain (much like co-branded Wendy's–Tim Hortons locations in Canada), depending on business that day, both chains' products can be bought at a single counter (typically Dunkin' Donuts'). The practice of single-counter service is similar to that of multibranded Yum! Brands stores such as KFC–Taco Bell, which share a single kitchen and cashier line.

As of February 9, 2017, all Dunkin' locations are franchisee owned and operated. In addition to its stand-alone shops, Dunkin' shops can be found within many gas stations, supermarkets, mall and airport food courts, and Walmart stores. In July 2013, Dunkin' Donuts opened its 500th restaurant in New York City. This location is combined with a Baskin-Robbins.

On July 30, 2020, Dunkin' Brands announced it would permanently close 800 stores in the US by the end of the year because of a 20 percent drop in sales in the second quarter during the COVID-19 pandemic, 450 of which are part of the previously announced closing of locations within Speedway gas stations.

As of 2019, 40 Dunkin' Donuts shops in the United States were certified fully kosher, in addition to one that sells both kosher-certified and non-kosher products.

In early 2025, Dunkin' announced it would no longer upcharge for dairy alternatives in their drinks.

=== Canada ===
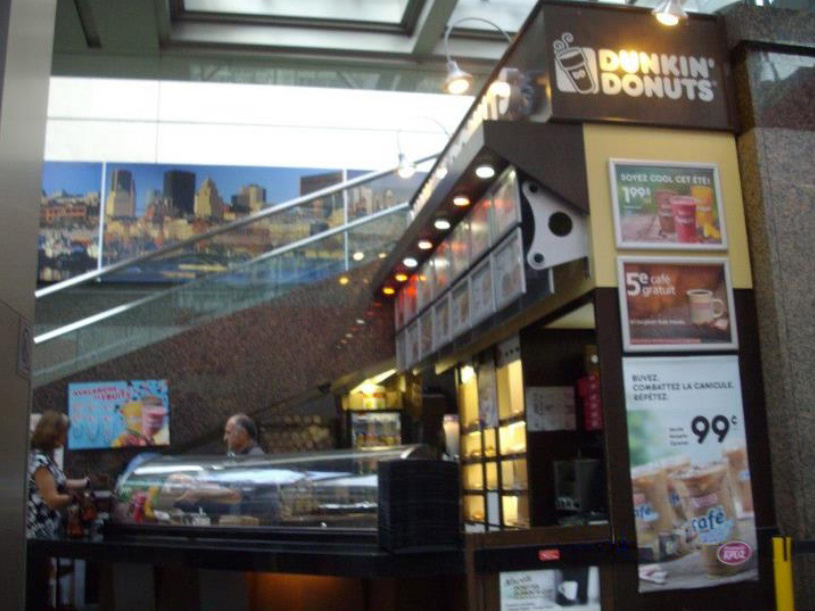
In 2017, one of the last remaining Dunkin' Donuts locations in Canada (at Montreal's Place Ville Marie) closed.

Despite once having hundreds of stores nationwide, Dunkin' Donuts and its market share all but vanished from Canada by the turn of the 21st century. In the late 1990s to early 2000s, the chain began disappearing from all regions of Canada, with its last foothold in the province of Quebec. However, its decline was most apparent in Quebec, where the chain once had 210 stores, but by mid 2017, had only three—the last franchises in the country. By then, only one free standing store had the facilities to make doughnuts fresh on site. The other two were merely shopping-mall food court stands, dependent on the delivery of baked goods from the main store. One of the primary reasons for Dunkin' Donuts' decline was competition with Tim Hortons, similar to Tim Hortons' own decline in the northeastern United States due to heavy competition from Dunkin' Donuts. A group of Dunkin' Donuts franchisees won a C$16.4 million civil court judgement against the parent company for failing to adequately promote the brand in Canada. In September 2018, after 57 years of operating in Canada, Dunkin' Donuts ceased business there when it refused to renew its franchise license to the few remaining stores left. All remaining Canadian locations were closed or rebranded as independent businesses in late 2018, ending the presence of Dunkin' Donuts in the country.

Baskin-Robbins, a subsidiary of Dunkin' Brands, continues to operate stores across Canada.

On May 12, 2026, Montreal-based franchisor Foodtastic agreed with American company Inspire Brands, owner of Dunkin', to open hundreds of Canadian locations in late 2026 or early 2027 after an absence of eight years in Canada.

=== International ===
By March 2014, Dunkin' Donuts' largest international market was South Korea, representing nearly 40 percent of all international sales. With over 900 outlets in the country, it had three times as many as McDonald's and about a third more than Starbucks. South Korea is home to Dunkin' Donuts' only coffee roasting plant outside the U.S. The company still sees China and its vastly larger population as the more lucrative opportunity. In 2008, Dunkin' Donuts opened its first restaurant in Shanghai, representing the first step in its China expansion strategy. By March 2014, it had about 50 stores in the country and an agreement to open 100 more over the next five years. The operation in China is under a franchise agreement with Jollibee Foods Cooperation, but only seven stores were opened in Beijing, opposed to the planned 100. In 2022, Jollibee announced that it will end the Dunkin Donuts franchise in China to allow expansions into other markets in other regions. Since then, stores started to close and as of 2025, there are no Dunkin stores in mainland China.

In Australia, Dunkin' Donuts opened in the 1980s, but by the late 2000s, they had left the Australian market. In 2014, Dunkin' Brands global chairman Nigel Travis said there were no plans in the short term to return the brand to the Australian market. Baskin-Robbins, a subsidiary of Dunkin' Brands, continues to exist in the country.

In Brazil, Dunkin' Donuts opened its first building in 1980. In 2013, it planned to open 25 franchises in the country.

In Colombia, Dunkin' Donuts opened its first store in Bogotá in 1983. By 2015, Dunkin' Donuts operated more than 100 stores only in the capital city of the country. As of February 2016, it operates more than 150 stores around the country including locations in the cities of Medellín, Cali, Ibagué, Pereira, Manizales and Barranquilla.

In January 2014, Dunkin' Donuts relaunched in England 20 years after it exited the country with its store opening in Harrow, London. There are no Dunkin' Donuts stores in Scotland, Northern Ireland or Wales.

On December 5, 2014, Dunkin' Donuts opened their first location in the Nordic region, at the Täby Centrum shopping mall in the outskirts of Stockholm, Sweden. On July 24, 2018, Dunkin' Donuts announced that the company's Swedish operations had filed for bankruptcy and all locations in Sweden would close immediately. On April 1, 2015, the first store in Denmark opened in Copenhagen Central Station and by May 5, 2015, one opened at Roskilde railway station. There is still one under construction in Odense.

In early December 2015, Dunkin' Donuts opened their first cafe in 13 years in Warsaw. By 2018, the Polish franchisee, Varsovia Food Company Sp. z o.o., operated five stores across Poland. In August 2018, Dunkin' decided to withdraw from the Polish market, leading the franchisee to terminate its remaining leases.

On January 21, 2016, Dunkin' Brands announced a master franchise agreement with Grand Parade Investments Ltd. that called for developing 250 Dunkin' Donuts and 70 Baskin-Robbins outlets throughout South Africa. The first stores opened in the end of 2016 in the Cape Town area. Eventually, only 11 Dunkin' Donuts locations and five Baskin-Robbins locations opened in South Africa due to GPI's financial trouble. However, by February 2019, Grand Parade Investments announced that it permanently closed all Dunkin' Brands locations in South Africa due to poor performance.

In September 2015, Roland Zanelli, the owner of the Dunkin' Donuts license in Switzerland, announced the opening of the first two stores in Basel, Switzerland in Fall 2015, followed by the opening of up to 60 stores in the whole country. The first Basel store opened on March 1, 2016.

In 2024, the company's operations in Belgium and the Netherlands went bankrupt, but insisted that all of the locations would stay open.

==== India ====
On February 24, 2011, Dunkin' Donuts signed a master franchise agreement with Indian food service company Jubilant FoodWorks to operate the brand in India. Jubilant FoodWorks opened the country's first Dunkin' Donuts outlet at Connaught Place, New Delhi in April 2012. In November 2014, Dunkin' Donuts opened its first store in Kanpur, Uttar Pradesh inside Z Square Mall.

There were 32 Dunkin' Donuts outlets across 10 Indian cities as of December 31, 2019.

On March 30, 2026, it was announced that Jubilant FoodWorks had decided not to renew development and operation agreements of Dunkin' Donuts in India. The agreement is to expire on December 31, 2026.

==== Spain ====
The term "Donuts" was already trademarked by one of the largest Spanish bakery firms, Panrico, so the company was born as a joint venture between Dunkin' Donuts' then-parent Allied Domecq and Panrico (only Spanish shareholders, representing 50%) in order to use the brand name "Dunkin' Donuts". In 2007, after Dunkin' Donuts bought out Panrico's 50% share, the stores were rebranded to "Dunkin' Coffee". As of 2017, there are 59 Dunkin' Coffee locations in Spain, the majority of which are in Barcelona, Madrid, and Málaga. Their slogan, "Juntos es mejor", translates to "Together is better".

==== United Kingdom ====
As of 2025, Dunkin' currently operates 22 sites in the United Kingdom, all in England. This follows what it called an 'aggressive extension plan' in 2023 owing to popular sales.

==== Lebanon ====
Dunkin' opened its first location in Lebanon in 1998 and has since gained a lot of admiration among Lebanese people and is now one of the most popular coffee shops with many branches spread across the country.

In 2020, Dunkin' Lebanon started selling its products in supermarkets and grocery stores.

==== Japan ====
The first Dunkin Donuts store in Japan opened around 1969 in Ginza, Tokyo, Tokyo, becoming the first Asian country to have Dunkin' Donuts. The Japanese chain was owned by a joint venture between the Saison Group, Yoshinoya, and the Japanese subsidiary of the Compass Group named Seiyo Food Systems.

As of 1982, it had 15 outlets, although The New York Times states that it had "43 outlets".

After 28 years of operating in Japan, Dunkin' Donuts ceased business there in 1998 due to declining sales and poor performance. All of the non-military base locations were either closed or converted to Mister Donut locations. Dunkin' still has locations in United States military bases, which are open only to military personnel.

==== Malaysia ====
Dunkin' established its presence in Malaysia in 1987 with its first outlet in Bukit Bintang, Kuala Lumpur. The brand has since expanded to over 100 outlets across Peninsular Malaysia and Sabah, operating in shopping malls, airports and urban centers.

In 2024, Dunkin' opened its 100th outlet at Kota Kinabalu International Airport. Spanning 1,800 square meters with a seating capacity of 88 guests, it is the largest Dunkin' location in the country. The brand in Malaysia is operated by Golden Donuts, the master franchisee since 1987.

==== South Korea ====
Dunkin' Donuts Korea launched a fun-shaped doughnut with fried chicken legs in cooperation with Kyochon, a South Korean chicken franchise.

==== Philippines ====
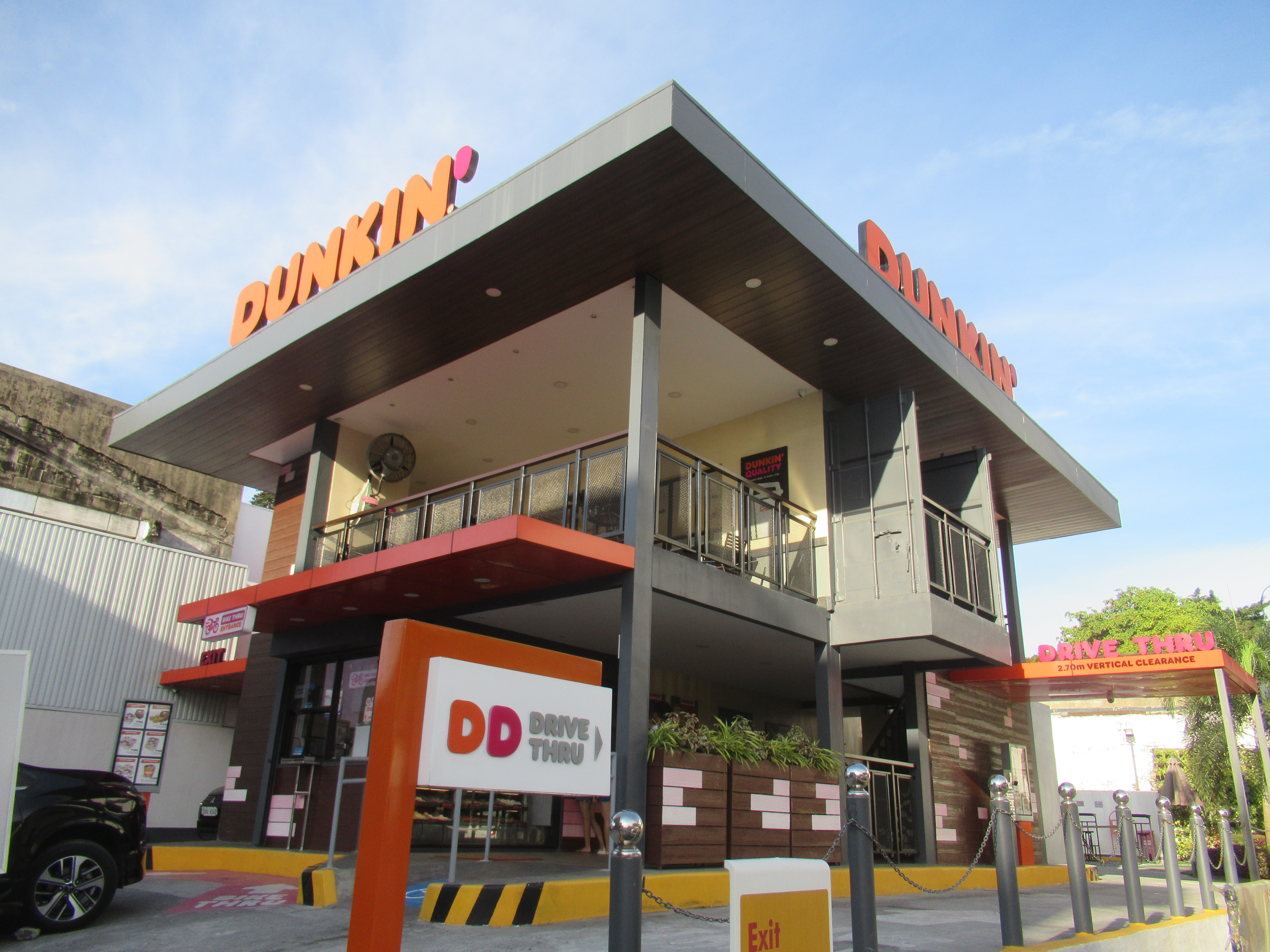
A drive-thru Dunkin' store in San Francisco del Monte, Quezon City

The first Philippine store of Dunkin' Donuts opened in Makati on April 12, 1981 under the Philippine franchisee Golden Donuts Incorporated (GDI). Dunkin' Donuts later expanded outside Metro Manila when Queen City Food Chain, Inc. opened its first outlet in Fuente Osmeña, Cebu City in 1986. It later expanded to Mindanao when its first two branches in Cagayan de Oro opened in 1991. Its first drive-thru store was opened in Tomas Morato Avenue, Quezon City in January 2021. In mid-August 2023, Dunkin' opened its 800th Philippine store in Laoag, becoming the largest coffee operator in the country. On June 1, 2026, Dunkin' opened their 900th Philippine Store Milestone, less than a year after they hit 800th Mark.

==== Singapore ====
The first Dunkin' Donuts store in Singapore opened at Goldhill Square on April 3, 1983. The Singapore franchise for Dunkin' Donuts was initially through Spes Universal Pte Ltd, consisting of Singaporean and Filipino shareholders.

==== Saudi Arabia ====
Dunkin' Donuts opened its first location in Saudi Arabia in 1986. As of October 2024, it operates over 800 stores in the Kingdom.

==== Israel ====
Dunkin' Donuts Israel (Hebrew: דאנקן דונאטס) was an Israeli franchise of the chain. Dunkin' Donuts Israel opened their first location in Israel in 1996 in Tel Aviv. Their main flagship store was located in Rabin Square, with their factory in Lod. Upon opening their first location, Dunkin' was a huge hit. When the original location opened, it broke Dunkin's own sales records by selling 3 million doughnuts in the first eight months. The chain's manager was quoted saying "Israelis do not stop eating doughnuts, They buy such quantities, quantities that we would never have believed they would buy. They buy boxes of 12, eat them here, and then buy more boxes to take home."

In 2001, when Dunkin' Donuts Israel decided to close, the company had accumulated a large amount of debt. When the Second Intifada broke out, Israeli tourism slowed, and Dunkin' decided to close. Approximately $2 million was invested in Dunkin' Donuts Israel when it failed. At the peak, Dunkin' Donuts had 9 branches in Israel, short of their original goal of 15, including 3 in Jerusalem.

==== New Zealand ====
The first New Zealand store opened in Manukau, Auckland in 2001; three others also opened in Auckland that year. By 2017, it had 12 Auckland stores and two other cities. By 2022, it had 15 Auckland stores and three other cities.

==== Costa Rica ====
In August 2024, the first Dunkin' location in Costa Rica opened in Heredia.There are currently, eight locations in operation in Costa Rica: six in San José, one in Cartago, and one in Heredia.

==== France ====
In May 2025, Dunkin' established its first location in France, in the 2nd arrondissement of Paris. As of now, there are thirteen Dunkin' locations in France, all of them are in Île-de-France, and the chain continues to expand.

== Advertising celebrity stars ==
- Ben Affleck
- Will Arnett
- Tom Brady
- Steve Burns (1998)
- Matt Damon
- Dingdong Dantes (2019–2020)
- Meghan Duggan
- Janno Gibbs (2002–2003)
- Rob Gronkowski
- Kim Soo-hyun (2022–present)
- Joey de Leon (2004–2010)
- Eli Manning
- Matthew Morrison (2005)
- Christian Bautista (2005)
- David Ortiz
- Piolo Pascual (1990s, 2017–2020)
- Derek Ramsay (2013–2020)
- Kelly Perine (2005)
- Donny Pangilinan
- Belle Mariano
- Jeremy Strong
- Ice Spice (2023–present)
- Yoon Shi-yoon
- Kori King
- Sabrina Carpenter
- Jennylyn Mercado (2015-2016)
- Charli D'Amelio
- SB19 (2021–present)
- Ace Frehley

== Criticisms and controversies ==
In 1997, Dunkindonuts.org was established by a customer for disgruntled consumers and employees to lodge complaints about the company. The site appeared ahead of the company's own website in many search engines and received national media coverage before being purchased by Dunkin' Donuts in 1999.

Dunkin' Donuts was criticized by one of its franchisees for allegedly forcing single-store owners to agree to a buyout at a loss for minor infractions. Dunkin' Donuts sued franchise owners 154 times from 2006 to April 2008. Over the same time span, McDonald's was involved in five lawsuits. Subway, a company that has four times the number of locations as Dunkin' Donuts, sued its franchisees 12 times. These figures do not include arbitrations, which the companies use in pursuing legal claims against their franchisees. Franchisees allege that the company's business strategy needs mainly multi-unit franchisees.

In May 2010, Dunkin' Donuts was criticized for advertising "Free Iced Coffee Day" on its national Facebook page, which took place in only 13 cities. Due to the limited scope of the promotion, many customers became dissatisfied with the lack of free iced coffee and vented their anger on the Dunkin' Donuts Facebook page.

In 2012, Dunkin' Donuts published its first formal Animal Welfare Policy, outlining its approach to humane sourcing and supplier standards. The company committed to eliminating gestation crates from its U.S. pork supply chain by 2022 and worked with its suppliers and The Humane Society of the United States (HSUS) to support implementation. While it pledged to publish progress reports in 2018 and 2020, none were released, and as of 2025, the company no longer maintains a public commitment to eliminate gestation crates.

In 2013, the Dunkin' Donuts chain in Thailand used an advertisement that contained a photograph of a woman in black facepaint, in order to promote its new chocolate-flavored doughnuts. The company was criticized for the advertisement, with the Human Rights Watch calling it "bizarre and racist". The headquarters in the United States apologized for the advertisement.

Nancy Lewis, in Canaan, Connecticut, began a petition in January 2014 to request that Dunkin' Donuts donate their unsold food to local shelters and food banks in her area after seeing her local shop regularly throwing away "large amounts" of unsold food. She said because the company has no official policy on the redistribution of its unsold food items to shelters or food banks, and employees are not allowed to take any home, many affiliates throw all of the goods away.

In August 2024, a group of Trump supporters called for a boycott of Dunkin' Donuts for declining advertisements from Rumble for promoting right-wing populism. They also accused the company of being "woke".

In January 2025, donut manufacturer FGF Brands, LLC recalled 2 million donuts for Listeria contamination, some of which were sold by Dunkin' Donuts. All of the recalled products were released before December 13, 2024 and the recall is now expired. There were no reported illnesses from the contaminated product.

== See also ==
- Coffee wars
- Dunkin' Park – Baseball stadium in Hartford, Connecticut
- List of coffeehouse chains
- List of doughnut shops
