= Robert M. Rosenberg =

American businessman, professor, and author

- Born: March 22, 1938 (age 88); Boston, Massachusetts, U.S.
- Education: Cornell University (BA); Harvard University (MBA)
- Occupations: Businessman; professor; author
- Employers: Dunkin' Donuts; Allied Domecq; Babson College
- Board member of: Domino's Pizza (1999–2010); Sonic Corp. (1993–2016)
- Father: William Rosenberg

Robert M. Rosenberg (born March 22, 1938) is an American businessman, professor, and author. He was the chief executive officer of Dunkin' Donuts for thirty-five years from 1963 to 1998 and also served on the board of directors of Sonic Corp and Domino's Pizza. He was also an adjunct professor at Babson College's F. W. Olin Graduate School of Business.

== Early life and education ==
Rosenberg was born in 1938 in Boston, Massachusetts, to Bertha (née Greenberg) and William Rosenberg, who founded a group of restaurant businesses, Universal Food Systems, which included Dunkin' Donuts. Robert Rosenberg graduated with a bachelor's degree in 1959 from Cornell University's Hotel and Restaurant School, where he was a member of the Kappa chapter of Zeta Beta Tau. He later graduated with an MBA from Harvard Business School in 1963. During summer breaks, Rosenberg worked at his family's businesses. Kappa (Cornell University) named Rosenberg Zeta Beta Tau Man of Distinction for 2022.

== Career ==
In 1963, at the age of 25, Rosenberg assumed leadership of his family business, Universal Food Systems, as CEO and president. At the time, the company consisted of several small businesses grossing $20 million per year, including 100 Dunkin' Donuts locations in the U.S., generating $10 million in annual sales. Rosenberg transformed Universal Food Systems to focus on Dunkin' Donuts.

On February 6, 1968, Rosenberg took the company through its initial public offering. In September 1983, Rosenberg became chairman while continuing to serve as CEO of Dunkin' Donuts. The company remained publicly traded until 1989, earning investors a 35% compound rate of return. During his tenure as Dunkin' Donuts CEO, Rosenberg served on the board of the International Franchise Association. In 1970, he served as the association's chairman.

In late 1989, Dunkin' Donuts announced its acquisition by Allied-Lyons PLC, a large UK food and beverage group which also owned Baskin-Robbins. Rosenberg continued to lead the company that became known as Allied Domecq Retailing (later Dunkin' Brands) which also acquired Togo's sandwich shops. By the time Rosenberg retired in 1998, the company had about 6,500 locations around the world.

Following his retirement, Rosenberg went on to become an adjunct professor at Babson College's F. W. Olin Graduate School of Business. He also served as a trustee of the college. In addition to teaching at Babson, Rosenberg was on the board of directors at Sonic Corp., from April 1993 to 2016, and Domino's Pizza, from 1999 until April 2010, where he served both companies as chairman of their compensation committees.

In 2020, Rosenberg released a book, Around the Corner to Around the World (HarperCollins Leadership), which memorializes his 35 years as the CEO of Dunkin' Donuts. The book also offers advice on business management and franchising.

== Awards and honors ==
In 1968, Rosenberg was awarded the Golden Plate by the American Academy of Achievement and was named among the Greater Boston Chamber of Commerce's list of Ten Outstanding Young Leaders. He was a member of the President's Task Force on Equal Opportunity.

Rosenberg received an honorary degree in business administration from Johnson & Wales University in 1990. In 1992, he was honored by the International Food Manufacturers Association with their Golden Plate Award. Rosenberg was also inducted into Massachusetts Hospitality Hall of Fame. From Babson College, he received an honorary Doctor of Laws degree in 1997. In 2001, he was inducted into the Babson College's Academy of Distinguished Entrepreneurs. In 2007, he was inducted into the inaugural class of Edgecliff Hall of Fame of the Kappa chapter of Zeta Beta Tau. The International Franchise Association honored Rosenberg in 1998 when they inducted him into their Hall of Fame.

== Bibliography ==
- Rosenberg, Robert; Bedell, Madelon (1969). Profits from Franchising. McGraw-Hill. OCLC 318246589.
- Spinelli, Stephen; Rosenberg, Robert; Birley, Sue (2004). Franchising: Pathway to Wealth Creation. FT Press. ISBN 978-0-13-009717-0.
- Rosenberg, Robert (October 13, 2020). Around the Corner to Around the World: A Dozen Lessons I Learned Running Dunkin Donuts. HarperCollins Leadership. ISBN 978-1-4002-2049-6.
