= Dunkindonuts.org =

Website formed to list complaints about Dunkin' Donuts; deactivated in 2000

dunkindonuts.org
- Website type: Consumer complaint / "gripe" site
- Available in: English
- Dissolved: 2000
- Owners: David Felton (1997–1999); Dunkin' Donuts (1999–2000)
- Creator: David Felton
- Editor: David Felton
- Revenue: Sale to Dunkin' Donuts in 1999 (amount undisclosed)
- Website: dunkindonuts.org (archived)
- Commercial: No
- Launched: 1997; 29 years ago
- Current status: Defunct (domain redirected to dunkindonuts.com in 1999; content deactivated 2000)

dunkindonuts.org was a "gripe" website operated for two years by David Felton, a 25-year-old school teacher from Hamden, Connecticut. Felton founded the site in 1997 after he discovered that Dunkin' Donuts coffee stores in Hartford, Connecticut did not carry certain items, such as 1% milk. The site was established as a hotbed for complaints, inviting Dunkin' Donuts customers and disgruntled employees to vent their opinions about the company and its service for the world to see.

Its comment form logged troves of messages from customers across the United States. Media coverage put dunkindonuts.org in the national spotlight as one early example of corporate criticism on the World Wide Web. The .org site was sometimes listed on search engines before the company's own website.

== Corporate response and demise of site ==
Dunkin' Donuts responded to some complaints in a constructive manner, adding missing items to its menu and sending coupons via e-mail to customers who had complained on the .org site.

In July 1998, Dunkin' Donuts sent a cease and desist letter to Felton, to which he responded by telling them to purchase the site from him. Negotiations ensued, and in August 1999, the domain was finally transferred from Felton to the corporation, which promptly redirected it to its own .com page, quelling the drama. The final price for the site was undisclosed, but it was made public that negotiations began at $1,070 and increased from there.

== See also ==
- Consumer complaint
