= Christian Nyby =

American film and TV director and editor (1913–1993)

- Born: September 1, 1913; Los Angeles, California, U.S.
- Died: September 17, 1993 (aged 80); Temecula, California, U.S.
- Occupations: Director; editor
- Years active: 1943–1975
- Spouse: Thelma Litscher
- Children: Christian I. Nyby II; Kirkland R. Nyby

Christian Nyby (September 1, 1913 – September 17, 1993) was an American television and film director and editor. As an editor, he had seventeen feature film credits from 1943 to 1952, including The Big Sleep (1946) and Red River (1948). From 1953 to 1975 he was a prolific director of episodes in many television series, including Gunsmoke and Wagon Train. As a feature film director, he is likely best known for The Thing from Another World (1951).

== Career ==
Nyby was born in Los Angeles to Danish immigrant parents: the motion picture coordinator Ib Hansen Nyby (1882–1959) and Inger Astrid Nyby (1885–1973). He started his career as a film editor in the 1940s. He edited four films directed by Howard Hawks: To Have and Have Not (1944), The Big Sleep (1946), Red River (1948), and The Big Sky (1952). Nyby was nominated for the Academy Award for Red River. He had begun his career in the carpentry division at the studios, worked his way up to editor, then received his first directing credit on Hawks' 1951 production of The Thing from Another World (or The Thing as it is more commonly known), which was an instant success.

Nyby went on to have a prolific television and movie directing career from the 1950s to the 1970s. Dick Vosburgh wrote in his obituary that "After editing Hawks's next film The Big Sky (1952), Nyby turned to television, directing Ann Sothern's sitcom Private Secretary, which ran for four years. He also directed episodes of The Twilight Zone, I Spy, Lassie, Gomer Pyle – USMC, Adam-12, Perry Mason, The Rockford Files, The Six Million Dollar Man, Ironside, and Kojak. He did especially impressive work on such western series as Gunsmoke, Bonanza, Wagon Train, Whispering Smith, and Rawhide." He also directed four more feature films Hell on Devil's Island, Young Fury, Operation C.I.A. (the first lead role for Burt Reynolds), and First to Fight.

The most influential film that Nyby directed is The Thing from Another World (1951), which continues to attract viewers and critical attention more than 70 years after its release, and which was selected in 2001 for preservation in the US National Film Registry. Nyby's credit as the director has been challenged by some critics; Howard Hawks, the film's producer, was on the set for most of the filming, and is noted as one of the greatest film directors. Nyby said about the controversy in 1982:

Did Hawks direct it? That's one of the most inane and ridiculous questions I've ever heard, and people keep asking. That it was Hawks' style. Of course it was. This is a man I studied and wanted to be like. You would certainly emulate and copy the master you're sitting under, which I did. Anyway, if you're taking painting lessons from Rembrandt, you don't take the brush out of the master's hands.

Nyby was the father of Christian I. Nyby II, a prolific television director in his own right, and Kirkland Royal Nyby, who while studying law appeared in a few TV acting roles in the early 1970s as Kirk Nyby, before embarking on a legal career in California, finishing as Los Angeles Superior Court Commissioner.

== Death ==
Nyby died at age 80 in Temecula, California, on September 17, 1993.

== Filmography as director ==
- The Thing from Another World (1951)
- Light's Diamond Jubilee (1954)
- Hell on Devil's Island (1957)
- Young Fury (1965)
- Operation C.I.A. (1965)
- Elfego Baca: Six Gun Law (1966) (feature film made from edited episodes of The Nine Lives of Elfego Baca)
- First to Fight (1967)
- Emergency! (1973)
