= Sphinx =

Mythological creature with a human head and lion body

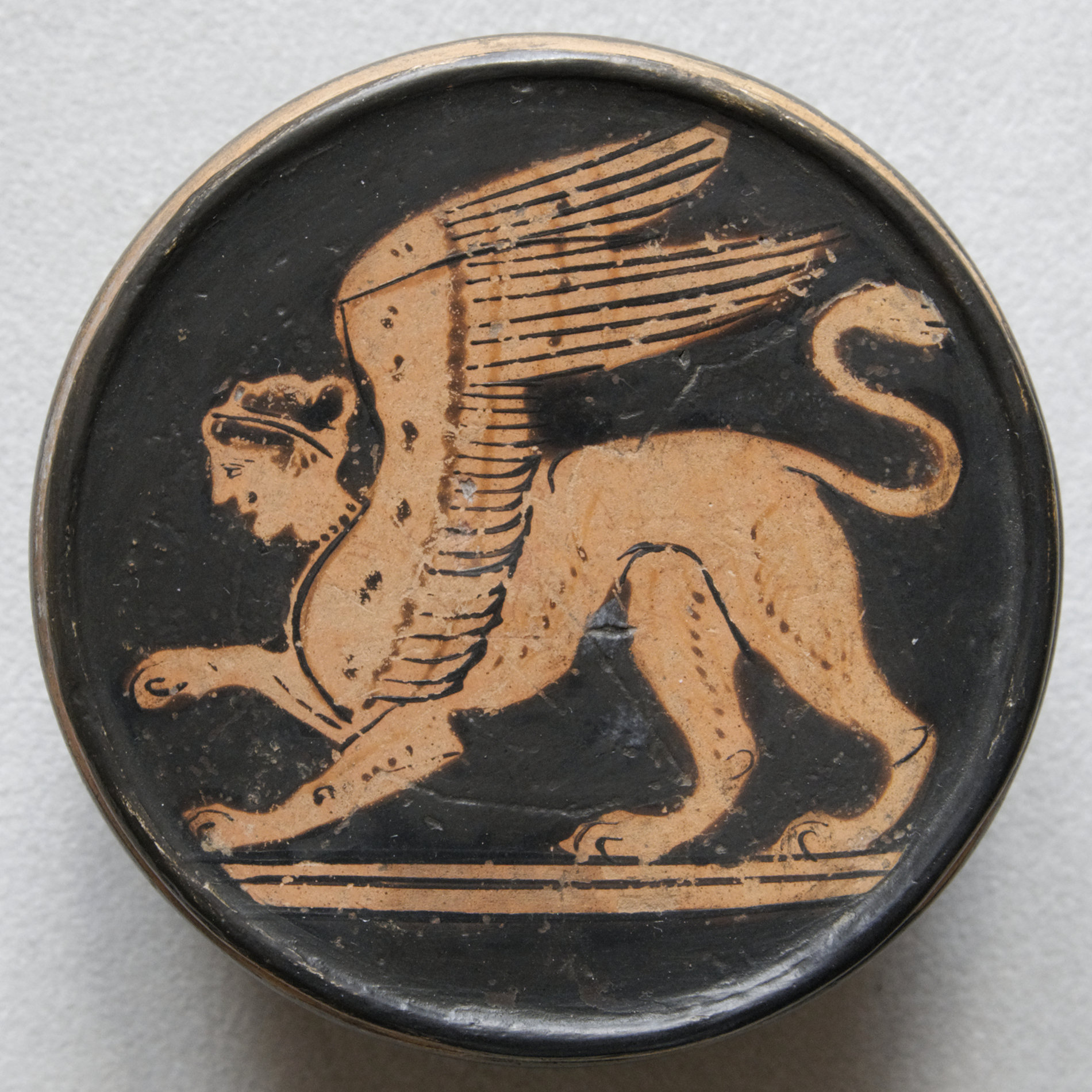
- Attic red-figure pyxis, 2nd half of the 5th century BC. From Nola, Italy.

Creature information
- Grouping: Legendary creatures
- Similar entities: Griffin, Manticore, Cherub, Lamassu, Narasimha

Origin
- Region: Egyptian and Greek

A sphinx (/sfɪŋks/ SFINKS; Ancient Greek: σφίγξ, pronounced [spʰíŋks]; pl. sphinxes or sphinges /ˈsfɪndʒiːz/) is a mythical creature with the head of a human, the body of a lion, and the wings of an eagle.

In Greek tradition, the sphinx is a treacherous and merciless being with the head of a woman, the haunches of a lion, and the wings of a bird. According to Greek myth, she challenges those who encounter her to answer a riddle, and kills and eats them when they fail to solve the riddle. This deadly version of a sphinx appears in the myth and drama of Oedipus.

In Egyptian mythology, in contrast, the sphinx is typically depicted as a man (an androsphinx (Ancient Greek: ἀνδρόσφιγξ)), and is seen as a benevolent representation of strength and ferocity, usually of a pharaoh. Unlike Greek or Levantine/Mesopotamian ones, Egyptian sphinxes were not winged.

Both the Greek and Egyptian sphinxes were thought of as guardians, and statues of them often flank the entrances to temples. During the Renaissance, the sphinx enjoyed a major revival in European decorative art. During this period, images of the sphinx were initially similar to the ancient Egyptian version, but when later exported to other cultures, the sphinx was often conceived of quite differently, partly due to varied translations of descriptions of the originals, and partly through the evolution of the concept as it was integrated into other cultural traditions.

However, depictions of the sphinx are generally associated with grand architectural structures, such as royal tombs or religious temples.

== Etymology ==
The word sphinx comes from the Greek Σφίγξ, associated by folk etymology with the verb σφίγγω (sphíngō), meaning "to squeeze", "to tighten up". This name may be derived from the fact that lions kill their prey by strangulation, biting the throat of prey and holding them down until they die. However, the historian Susan Wise Bauer suggests that the word "sphinx" was instead a Greek corruption of the Egyptian name "shesepankh", which meant "living image", and referred rather to the statue of the sphinx, which was carved out of "living rock" (rock that was a contiguous part of the stony body of the Earth, shaped, but not cut away from its original source), than to the beast itself.

== Egypt ==
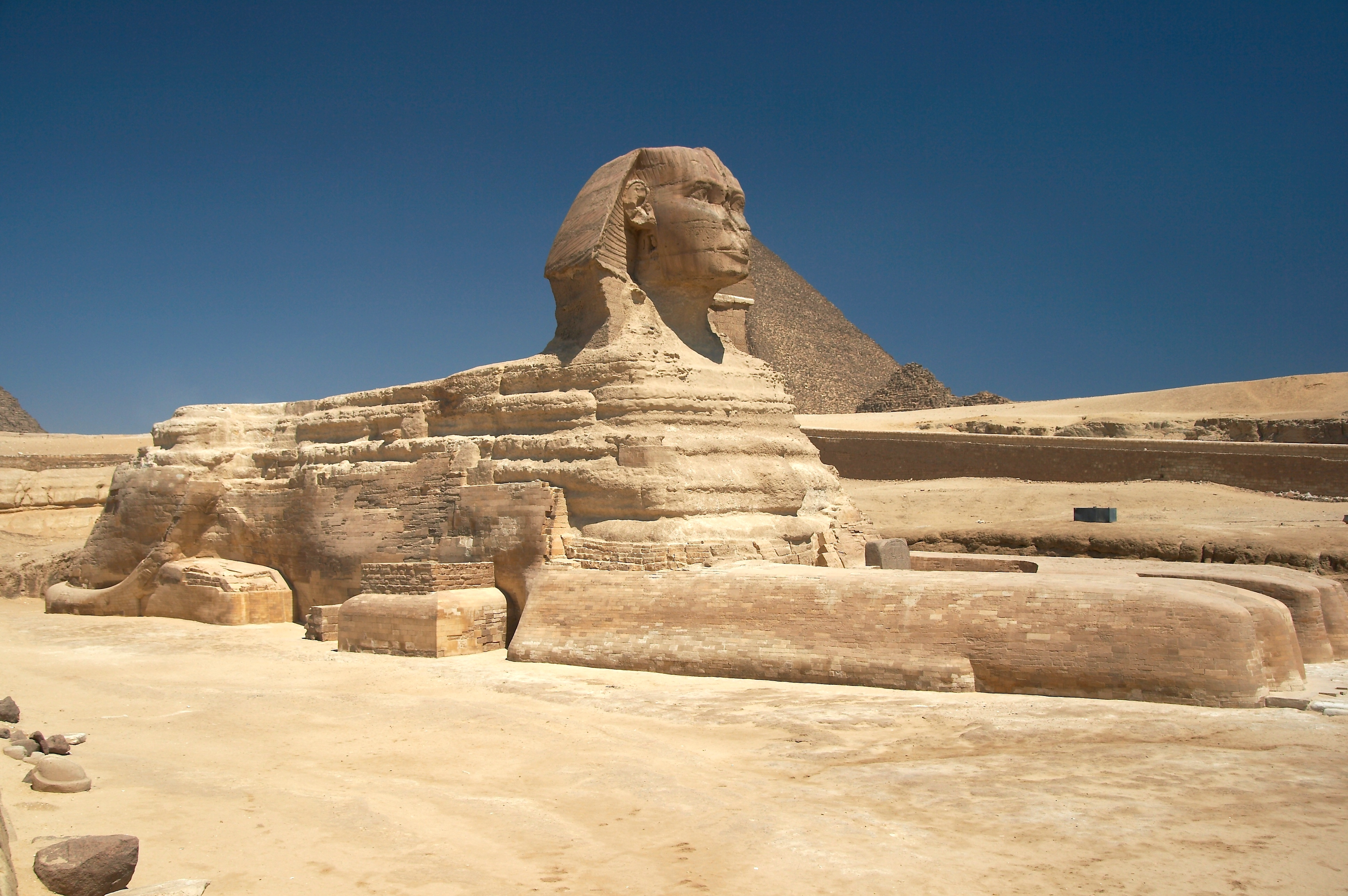
The Great Sphinx of Giza, with the Great Pyramid in the background

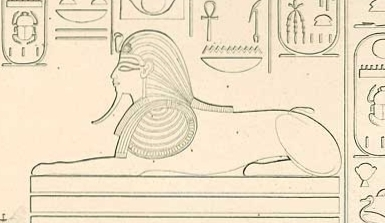
A Sphinx as depicted on the Dream Stele (1401 BC) at the Giza site, as recorded by Karl Richard Lepsius

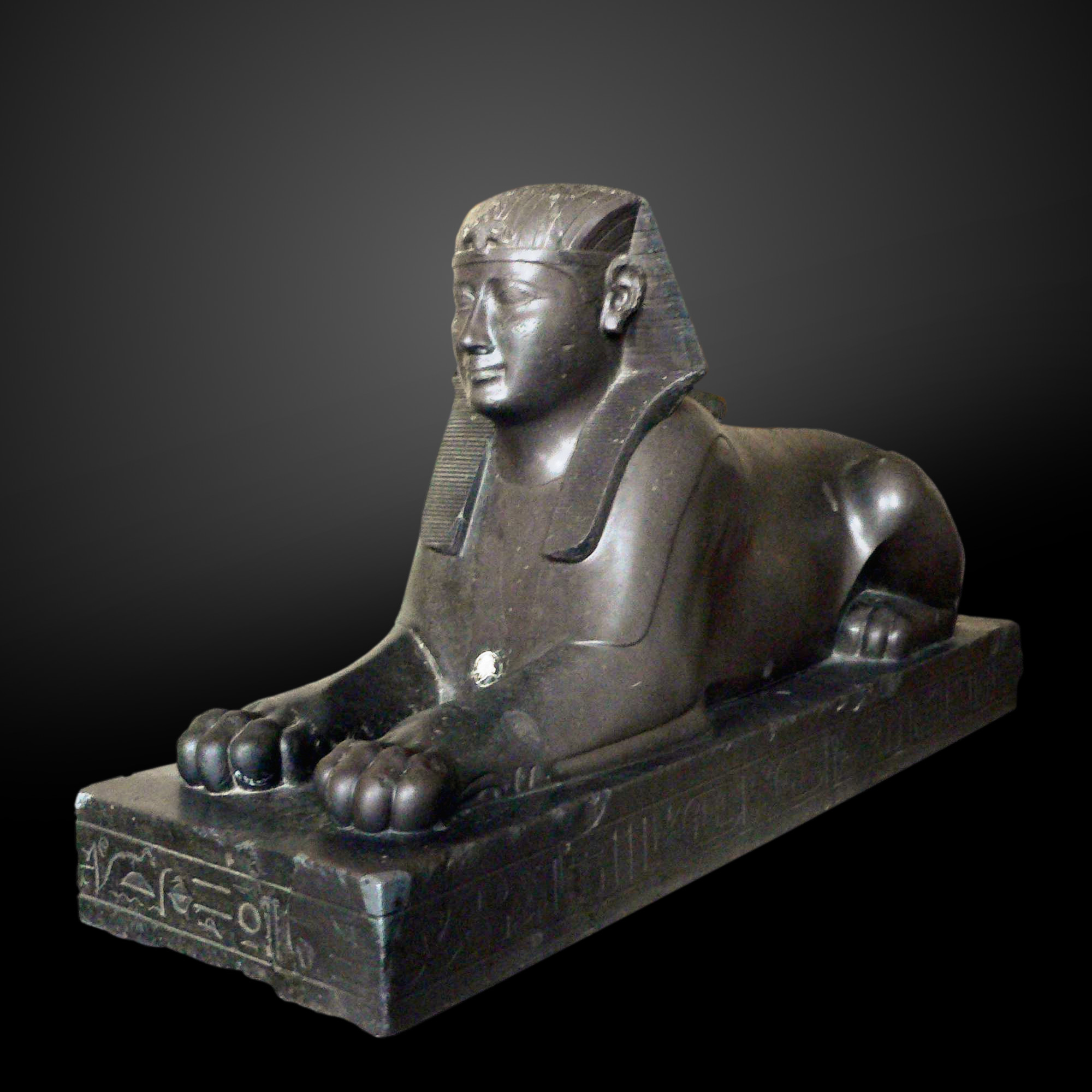
Sphinx statue, 392-379 BC. "A lion-headed goddess is a lion-goddess in human form, while a royal sphinx, conversely, is a man who has assumed the form of a lion." Henry George Fischer

The largest and most famous sphinx is the Great Sphinx of Giza, situated on the Giza Plateau adjacent to the Great Pyramids of Giza on the west bank of the Nile River and facing east (29°58′31″N 31°08′15″E). The sphinx is located southeast of the pyramids. While the date of its construction is not known for certain, the consensus among Egyptologists is that the head of the Great Sphinx bears the likeness of the pharaoh Khafre, dating it to between 2600 and 2500 BC. However, a fringe minority of late 20th century geologists have claimed evidence of water erosion in and around the Sphinx enclosure which would prove that the Sphinx predates Khafre, at around 10,000 to 5000 BC, a claim that is sometimes referred to as the Sphinx water erosion hypothesis but which has little support among Egyptologists and contradicts other evidence.

What names their builders gave to these statues is unknown. At the Great Sphinx site, a 1400 BC inscription on a stele belonging to the 18th dynasty pharaoh Thutmose IV lists the names of three aspects of the local sun deity of that period, Khepera–Rê–Atum. Many pharaohs had their heads carved atop the guardian statues for their tombs to show their close relationship with the powerful solar deity Sekhmet, a lioness. Besides the Great Sphinx, other famous Egyptian sphinxes include one bearing the head of the pharaoh Hatshepsut, with her likeness carved in granite, which is now in the Metropolitan Museum of Art in New York, and the alabaster Sphinx of Memphis, currently located within the open-air museum at that site. The theme was expanded to form great avenues of guardian sphinxes lining the approaches to tombs and temples as well as serving as details atop the posts of flights of stairs to very grand complexes. Nine hundred sphinxes with ram heads (Criosphinxes), believed to represent Amon, were built in Thebes, where his cult was strongest. At Karnak, each Criosphinx is fronted by a full-length statue of the pharaoh. The task of these sphinxes was to hold back the forces of evil.

The Great Sphinx has become an emblem of Egypt, frequently appearing on its stamps, coins, and official documents.

In March 2023, a limestone sphinx was discovered at the Dendera Temple Complex. This sphinx, which is depicted with a slight grin and dimples, is thought to be made in the image of the Roman emperor Claudius.

== Europe ==
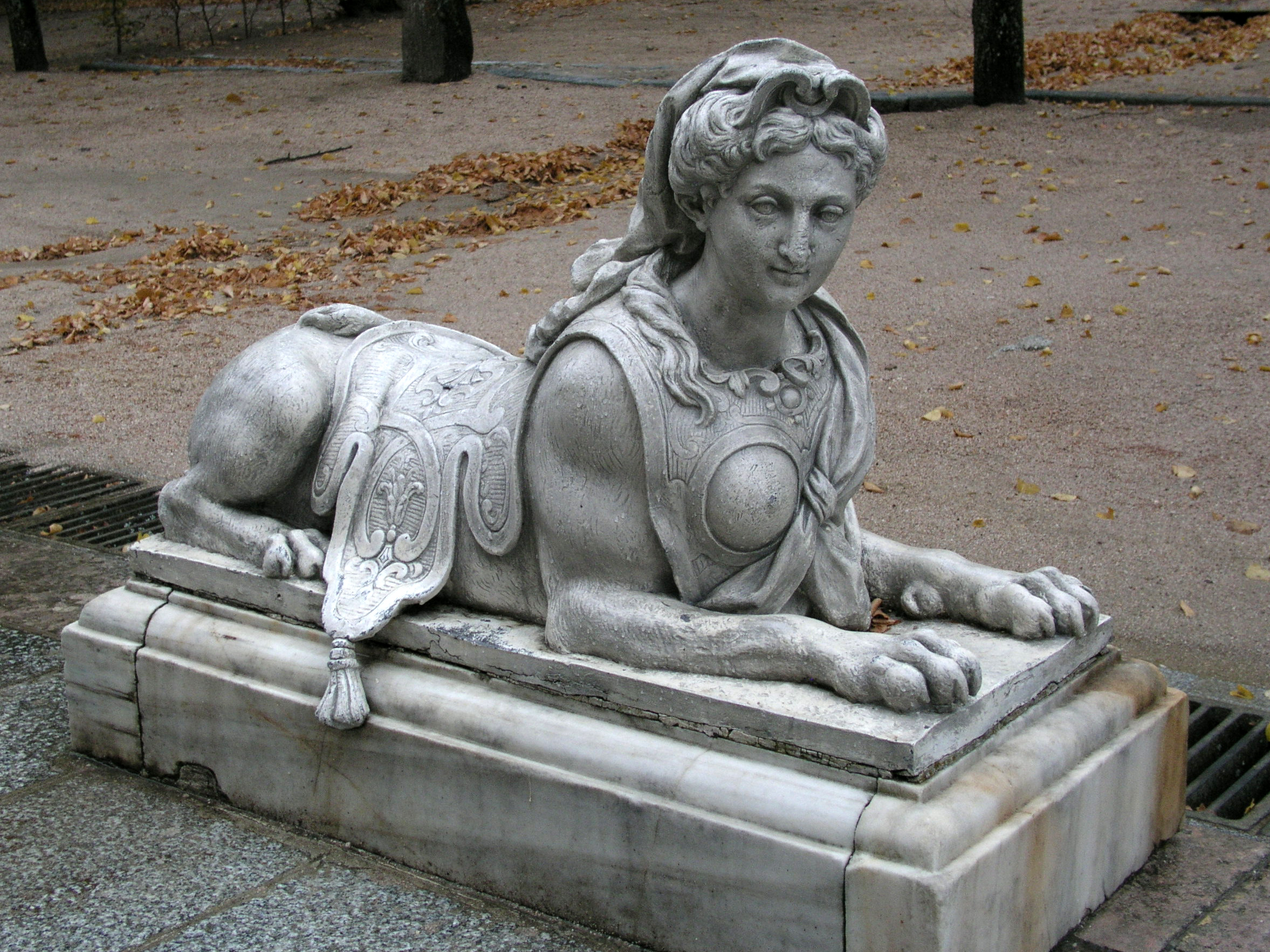
La Granja, Spain, mid-18th century

The revived Mannerist sphinx of the late 15th century is sometimes thought of as the "French sphinx". Her coiffed head is erect and she has the breasts of a young woman. Often she wears ear drops and pearls as ornaments. Her body is naturalistically rendered as a recumbent lioness. Such sphinxes were revived when the grottesche or "grotesque" decorations of the unearthed Domus Aurea of Nero were brought to light in late 15th-century Rome, and she was incorporated into the classical vocabulary of arabesque designs that spread throughout Europe in engravings during the 16th and 17th centuries. Sphinxes were included in the decoration of the loggia of the Vatican Palace by the workshop of Raphael (1515–20), which updated the vocabulary of the Roman grottesche.

The first appearances of sphinxes in French art are in the School of Fontainebleau in the 1520s and 1530s and she continues into the Late Baroque style of the French Régence (1715–1723). From France, she spread throughout Europe, becoming a regular feature of the outdoors decorative sculpture of 18th-century palace gardens, as in the Upper Belvedere Palace in Vienna, Sanssouci Park in Potsdam, La Granja in Spain, Branicki Palace in Białystok, or the late Rococo examples in the grounds of the Portuguese Queluz National Palace (of perhaps the 1760s), with ruffs and clothed chests ending with a little cape.

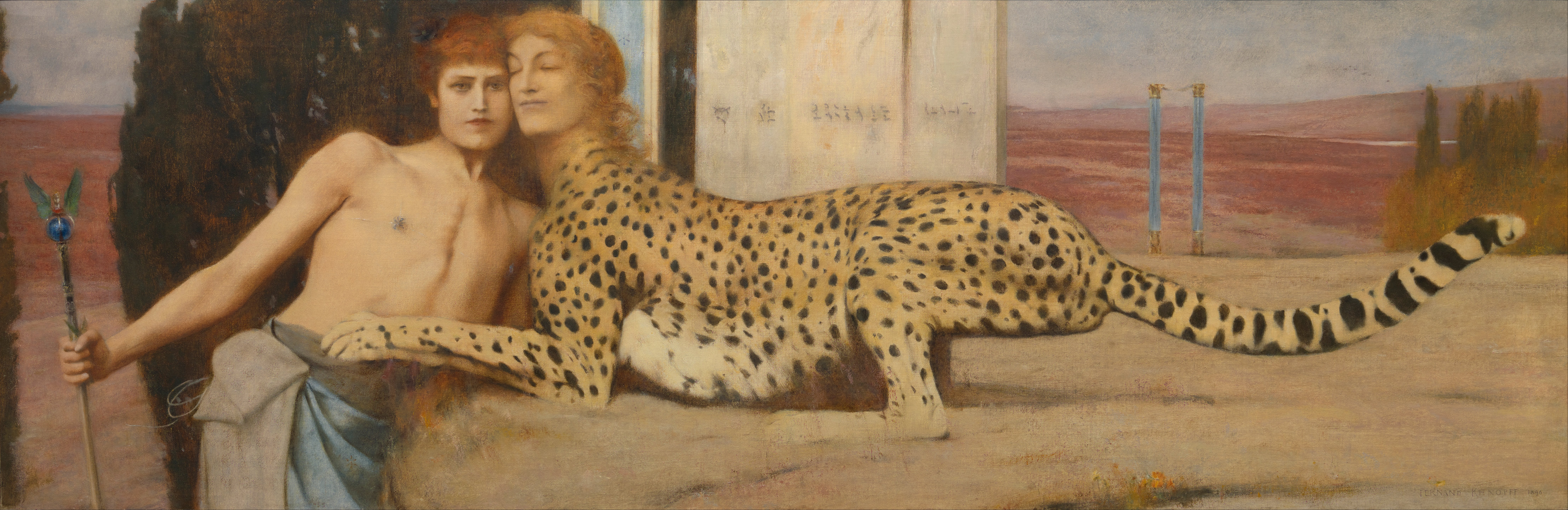
Caresses (1896) by Fernand Khnopff, a Symbolist depiction of Oedipus and the Sphinx

Sphinxes are a feature of the neoclassical interior decorations of Robert Adam and his followers, returning closer to the undressed style of the grottesche. They had an equal appeal to artists and designers of the Romanticism and subsequent Symbolism movements in the 19th century. Most of these sphinxes alluded to the Greek sphinx and the myth of Oedipus, rather than the Egyptian, although they may not have wings.

The Decadent Movement, a European movement that was attributed to the notion of "decadence" around the 1890s, implores the main notion of finding beauty in the decline of civilization in the form of macabre or taboo subjects such as the sphinx. The motif of the sphinx can also be connected to the motif of the "femme fatale" figure in decadent texts in which a typically female-like figure or beast seduces and murders men. The "femme fatale" is used to establish a decline or decay ranging from perversion, death, prostitution, and other taboos of Victorian society.

Oscar Wilde, a known Decadent writer, utilized this motif in his poem "The Sphinx". The poem itself establishes a connection between the Sphinx and the French due to underlying social decline such as the French Empire collapsing. Wilde describes the sphinx as a sort of half-cat and half-woman that is connected to many mythological events, typically that of Egypt and Greece, as well as how the mysterious creature is surrounded by lust and death. The writer James Thomson, similarly to Wilde, also utilizes the motif of the sphinx in his poem "The City of Dreadful Night". The poem revolves around an isolated and anxious man who runs throughout the city, his anxiety and fears taking on the personified image of a grandiose beast that has the makeup of a dragon and lion. While not inherently stated, the beast is likely that of a decadent form of a sphinx due to its appearance and grand nature.

=== Greece ===
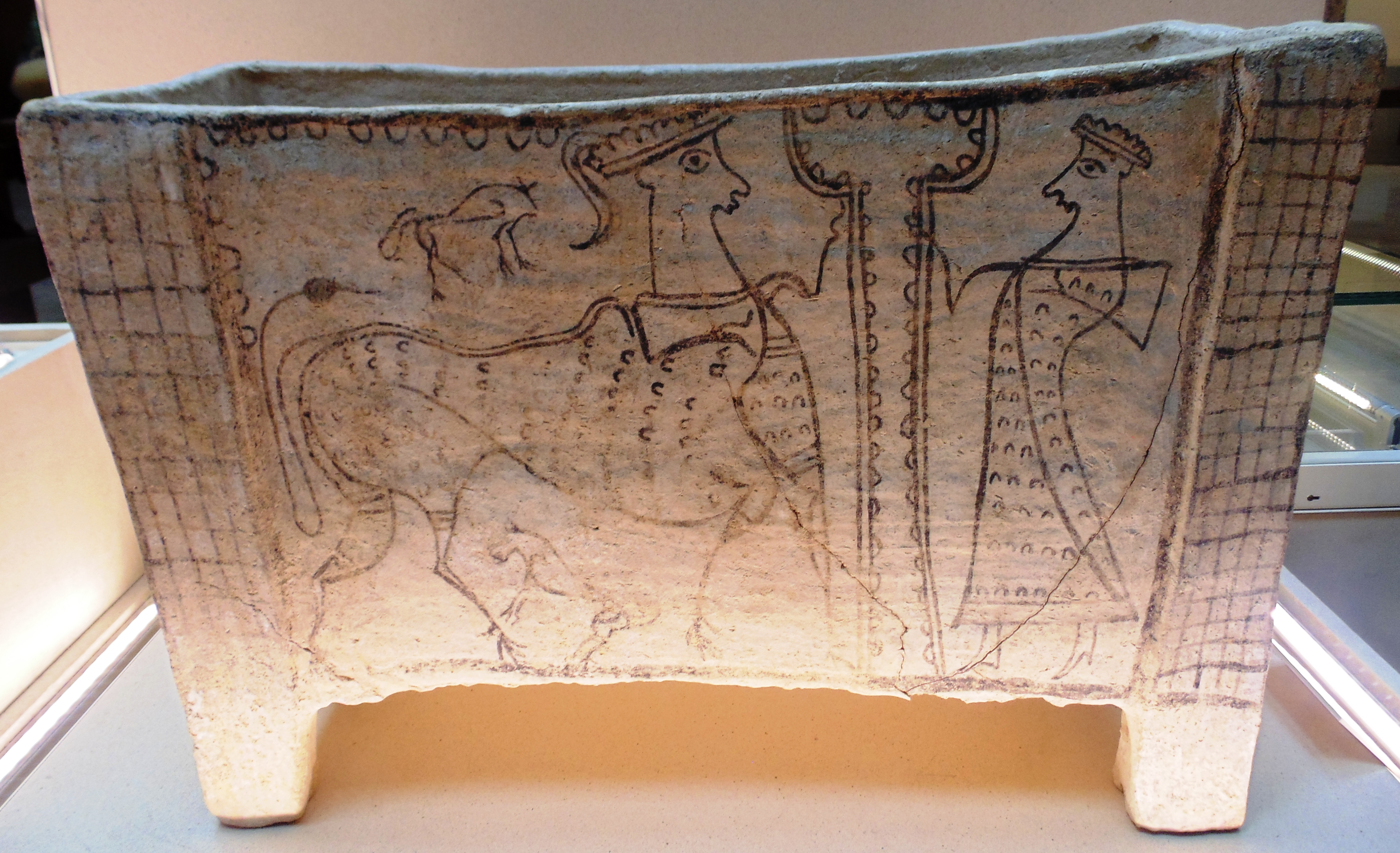
A sphinx or a female centaur on a Mycenaean larnax from Tanagra, 14th – 12th century BC, in the Archaeological Museum of Thebes.

In the Bronze Age, the Hellenes had trade and cultural contacts with Egypt. Before the time that Alexander the Great occupied Egypt, the Greek name, sphinx, was already applied to these statues. The historians and geographers of Greece such as Herodotus wrote extensively about Egyptian culture.

There was a single sphinx in Greek mythology, a unique demon of destruction and bad luck. Apollodorus describes the sphinx as having a woman's face, the body and tail of a lion and the wings of a bird. Pliny the Elder mentions that Ethiopia produces plenty of sphinxes, with brown hair and breasts, corroborated by 20th-century archeologists. Statius describes her as a winged monster, with pallid cheeks, eyes tainted with corruption, plumes clotted with gore and talons on livid hands. John Tzetzes described her as having the front of a lion, the rear of a human, the wings of a griffin and the claws of an eagle. Sometimes, the wings are specified to be those of an eagle, and the tail to be serpent-headed. According to Hesiod, the Sphinx was a daughter of Orthrus and an unknown she—either the Chimera, Echidna, or Ceto. According to Apollodorus and Lasus, she was a daughter of Echidna and Typhon.

The sphinx was the emblem of the ancient city-state of Chios, and appeared on seals and the obverse side of coins from the 6th century BC until the 3rd century AD.

==== Riddle of the Sphinx ====
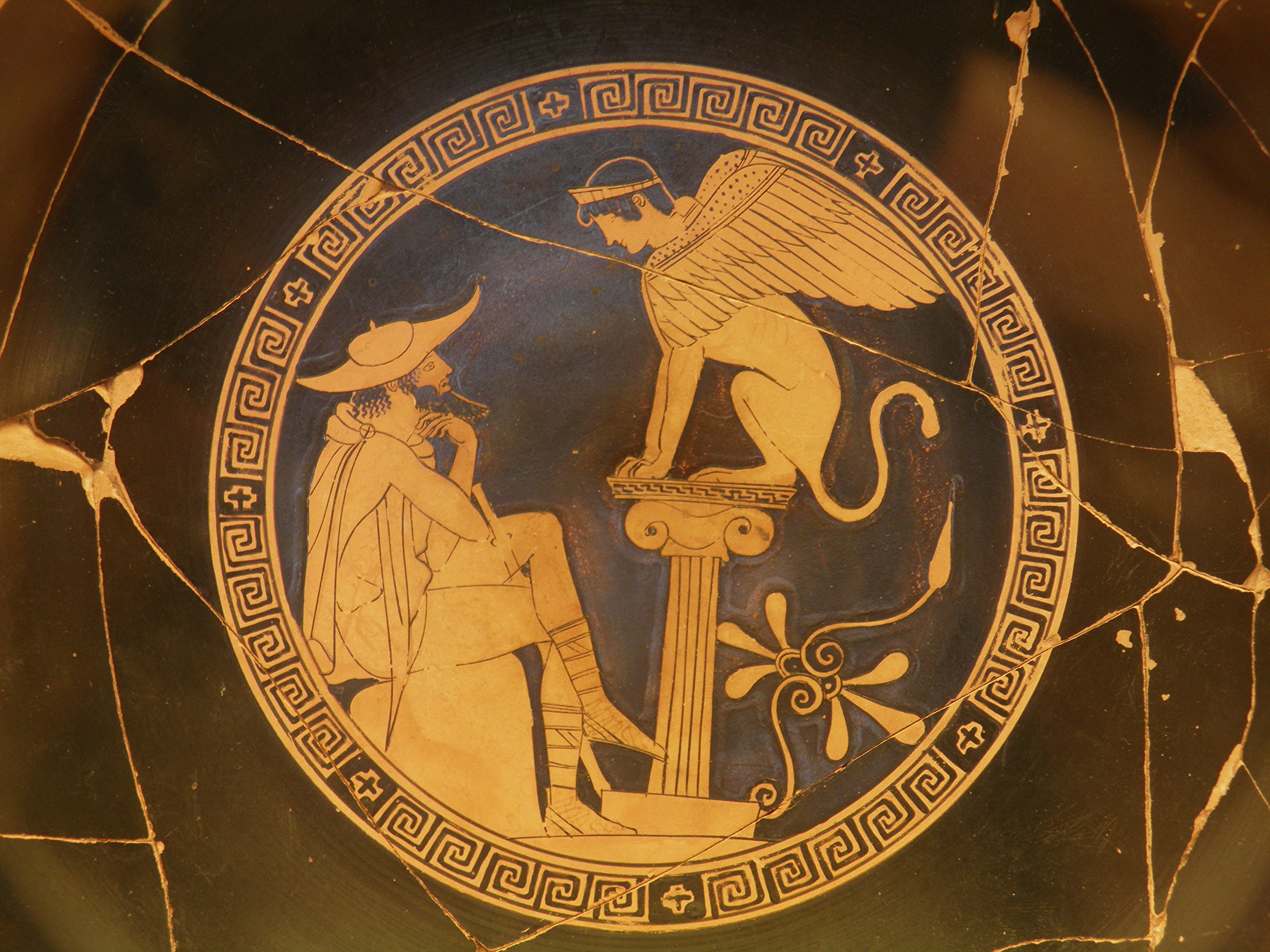
Attic red-figure kylix c. 470 BCE: Oedipus ponders the riddle of the Sphinx

The Sphinx is said to have guarded the entrance to the Greek city of Thebes, asking a riddle to travellers to allow them passage. The exact riddle asked by the Sphinx was not specified by early tellers of the myth, and was not standardized as the one given below until late in Greek history.

It was said in late lore that Hera or Ares sent the Sphinx from her Aethiopian homeland (the Greeks always remembered the foreign origin of the Sphinx) to Thebes in Greece where she asked all passersby the most famous riddle in history: "Which creature has one voice and yet becomes four-footed and two-footed and three-footed?" She strangled and devoured anyone who could not answer. Oedipus solved the riddle by answering: "Man—who crawls on all fours as a baby, then walks on two feet as an adult, and then uses a walking stick in old age". In some lesser accounts, there was a second riddle: "There are two sisters: one gives birth to the other and she, in turn, gives birth to the first. Who are the two sisters?" The answer is "day and night" (both words—ἡμέρα and νύξ, respectively—are feminine in Ancient Greek). This second riddle is also found in a Gascon version of the myth and could be very ancient.

Bested at last, the Sphinx then threw herself from her high rock and died; or, in some versions Oedipus killed her. An alternative version tells that she devoured herself. In both cases, Oedipus can therefore be recognized as a "liminal" or threshold figure, helping effect the transition between the old religious practices, represented by the death of the Sphinx, and the rise of the new, Olympian gods.

==== The riddle in popular culture ====
In Jean Cocteau's retelling of the Oedipus legend, The Infernal Machine, the Sphinx tells Oedipus the answer to the riddle in order to kill herself so that she did not have to kill any more, and also to make him love her. He leaves without ever thanking her for giving him the answer to the riddle. The scene ends when the Sphinx and Anubis ascend back to the heavens.

There are mythic, anthropological, psychoanalytic and parodic interpretations of the Riddle of the Sphinx, and of Oedipus's answer to it. Sigmund Freud describes "the question of where babies come from" as a riddle of the Sphinx.

Numerous riddle books use the Sphinx in their title or illustrations.

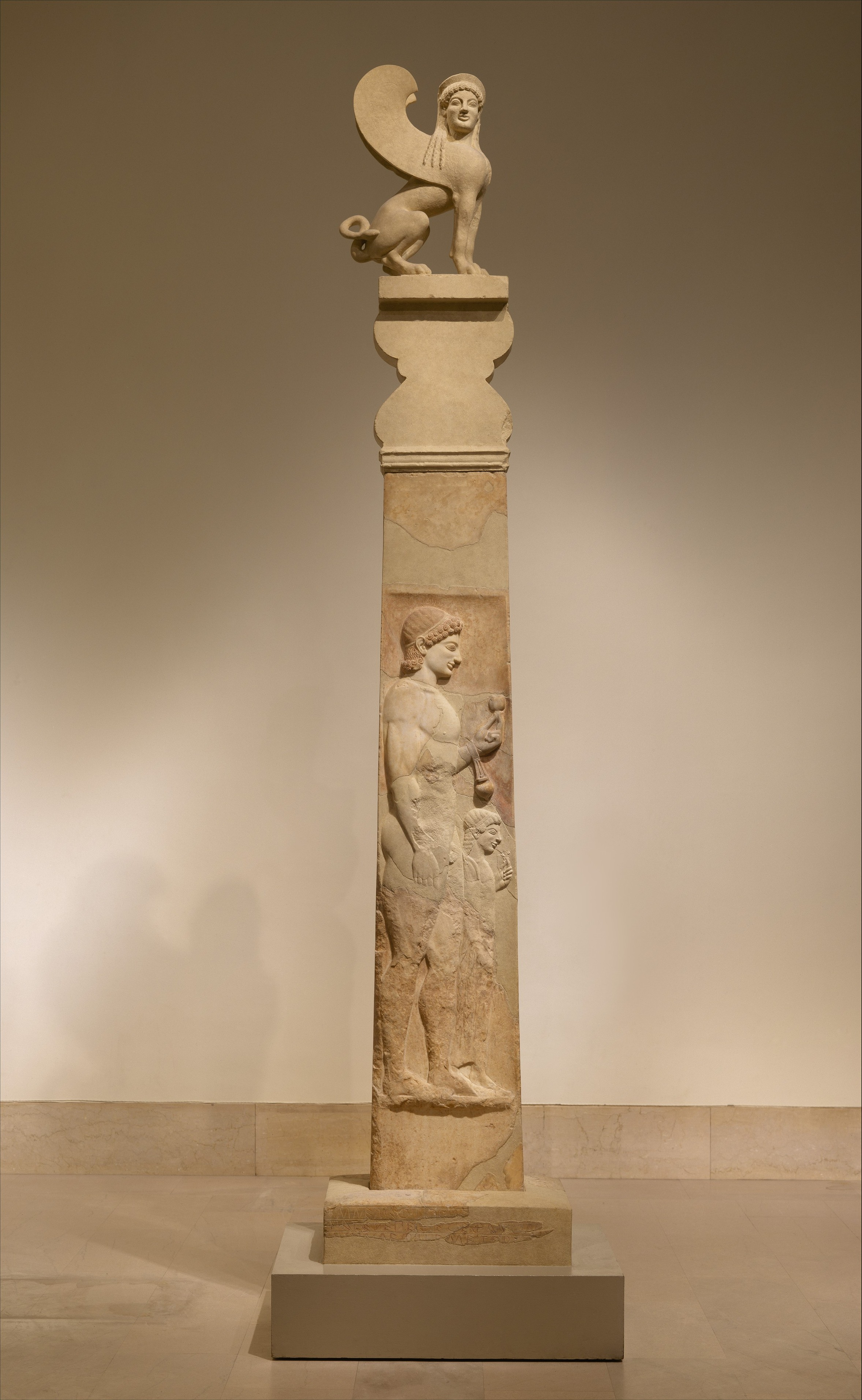
Funerary stele, 530 BC, Greece

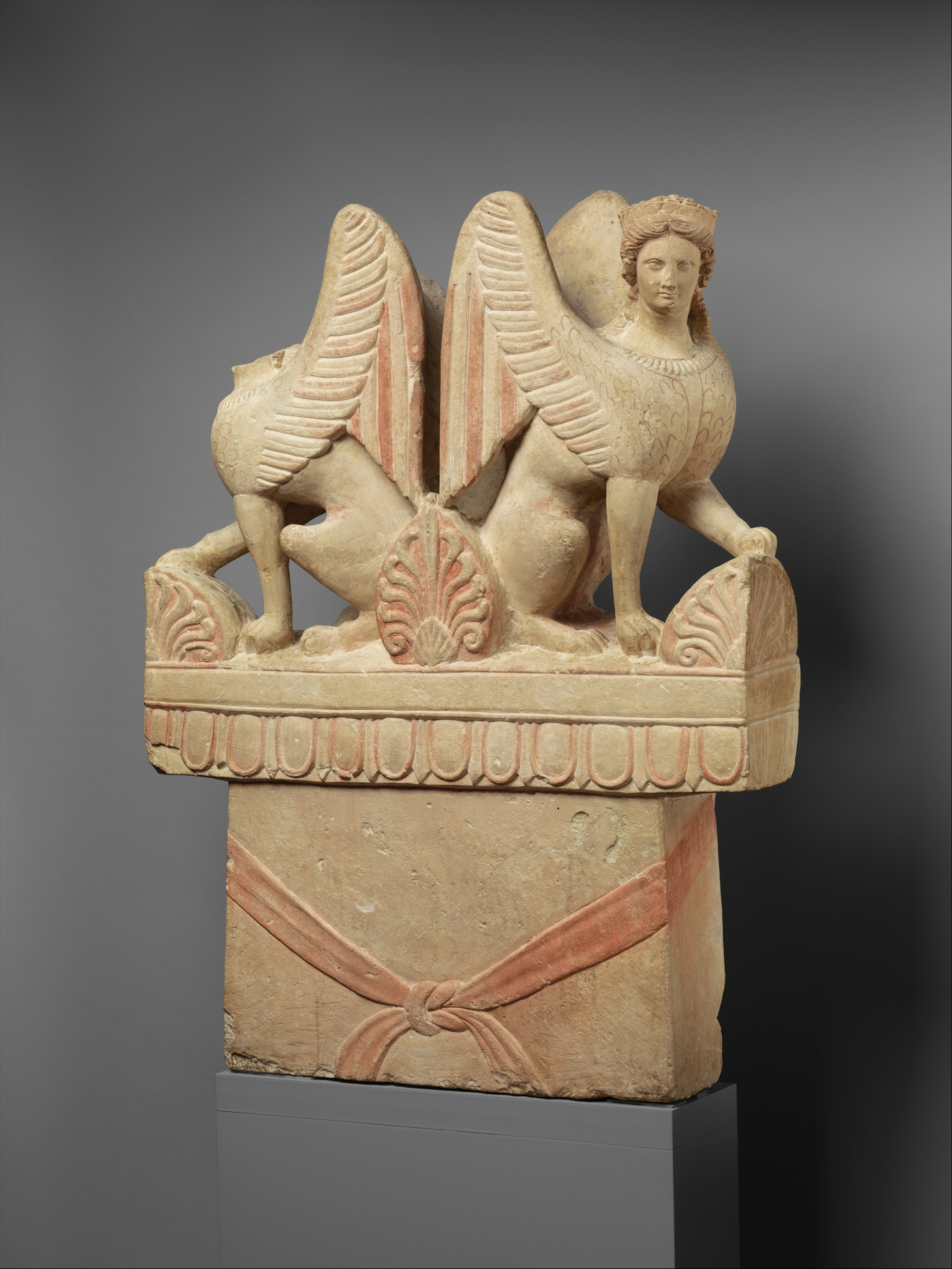
Limestone funerary stele (shaft) surmounted by two sphinxes. Greece, 5th century BC.

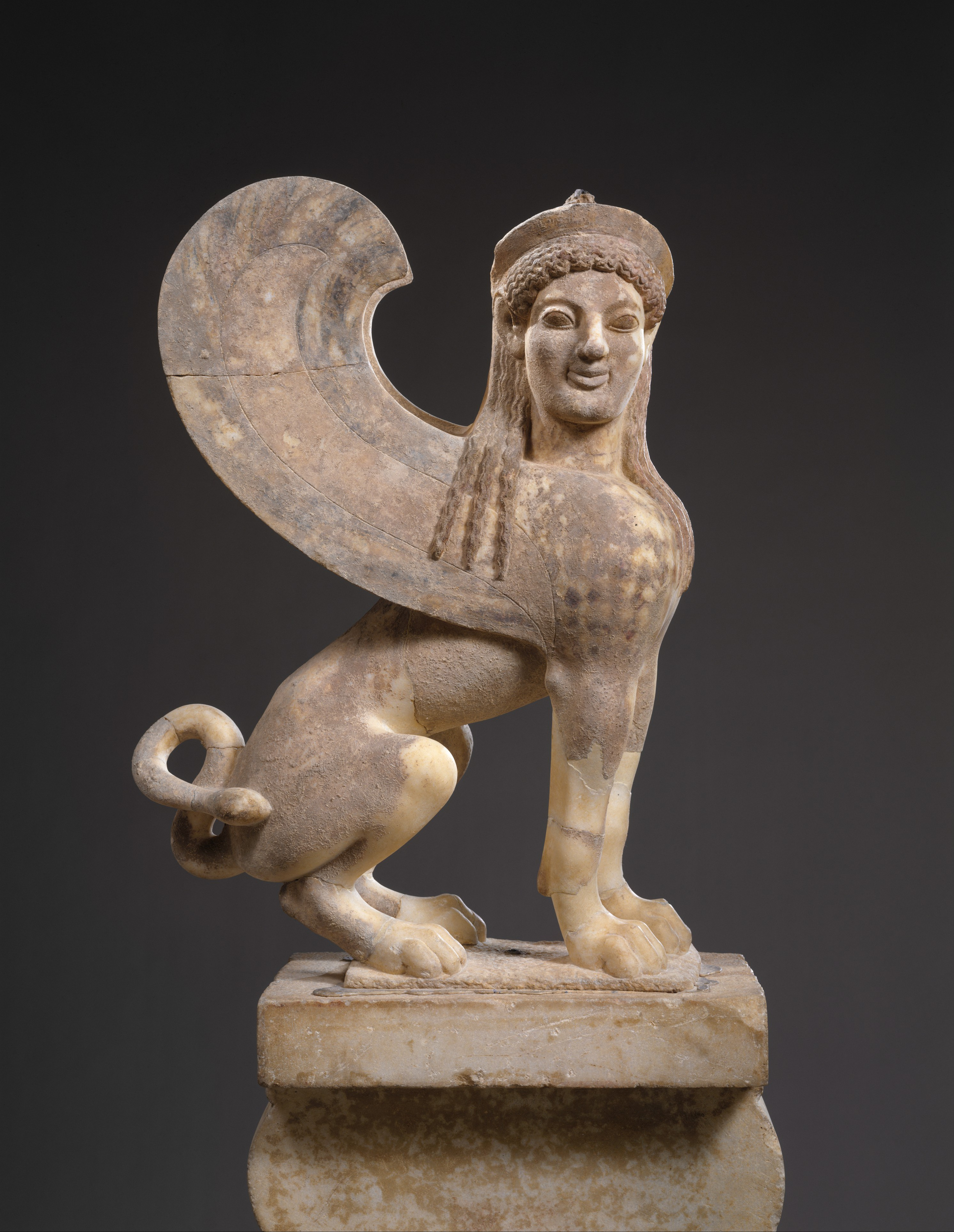
Marble capital and finial in the form of a sphinx, 530 BC

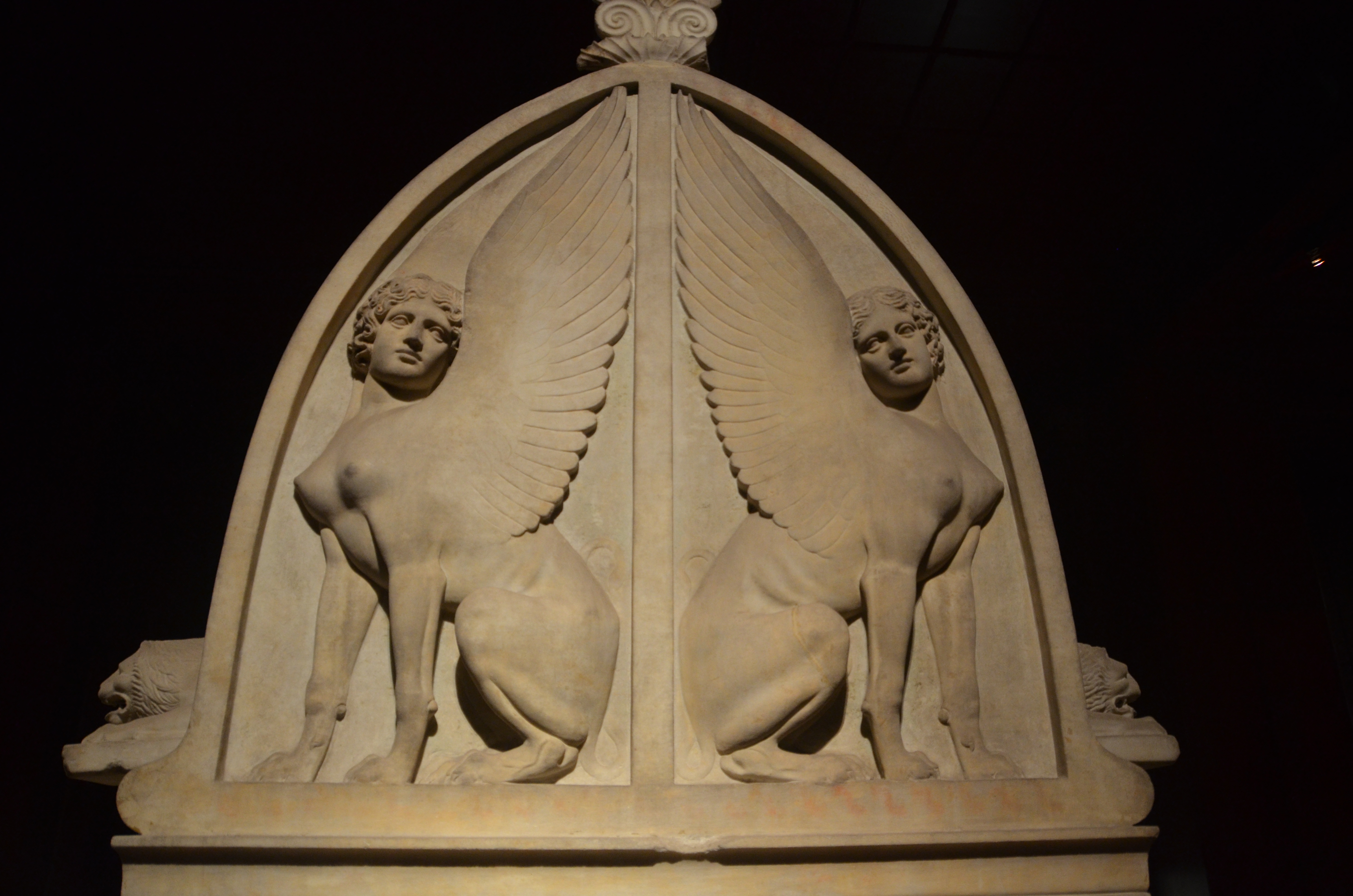
Sphinxes on the Lycian sarcophagus of Sidon (430–420 BC)

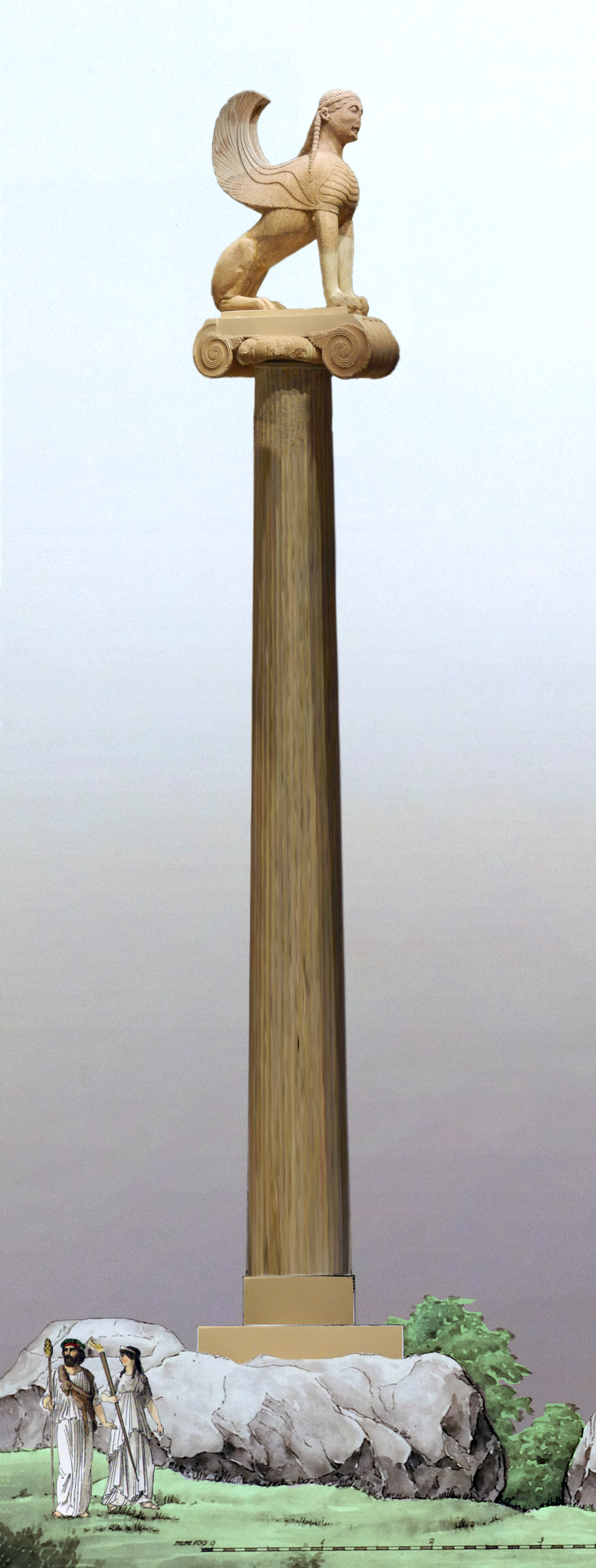
The Sphinx of Naxos, on its 12.5-meter Ionic column, Delphi, 560 BC (reconstitution)

=== Romania ===
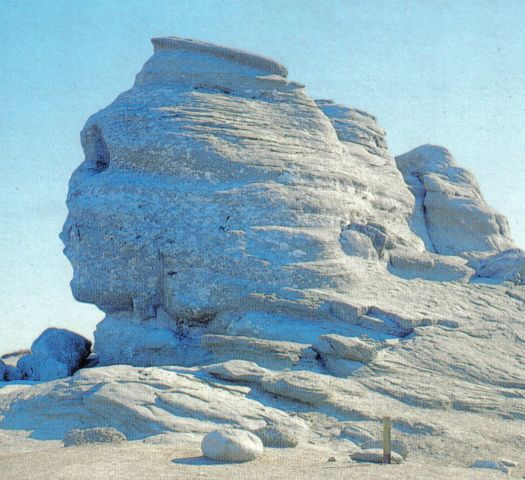
Sfinxul natural rock formation in the Bucegi Mountains

Sfinxul is a natural rock formation in the Bucegi Natural Park which is in the Bucegi Mountains of Romania. This rock formation is named for its resemblance to the Sphinx of Giza, and is located at an altitude of 2,216 metres (7,270 feet) within the Babele complex of rock formations.

== Asia ==
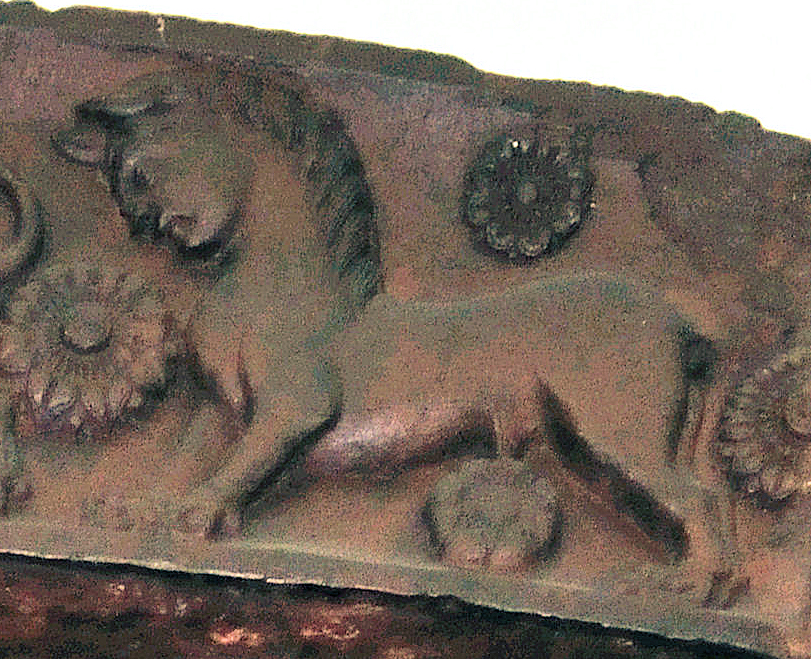
Buddhist sphinx on a stupa gateway, Bharhut, 1st century BC

A composite mythological being with the body of a lion and the head of a human is present in the traditions, mythology and art of South and Southeast Asia. Variously known as puruṣamr̥ga (Sanskrit, "human-animal"), purushamirugam (Tamil, "human-animal"), naravirala (Sanskrit, "human-cat") in India, or as nara-simha (Sanskrit, "human-lion") in Sri Lanka, manussiha or manutthiha (Pali, "human-lion") in Myanmar, and norasingha (from Pali, "human-lion", a variation of the Sanskrit "nara-simha") or thep norasingha ("man-lion deity"), or nora nair in Thailand. Although, just like the "nara-simha", she/he has a head of a lion and the body of a human.

In contrast to the sphinxes in Egypt, Mesopotamia, and Greece, of which the traditions largely have been lost due to the discontinuity of the civilization, the traditions related to the "Asian sphinxes" are very much alive today. The earliest artistic depictions of "sphinxes" from the South Asian subcontinent are to some extent influenced by Hellenistic art and writings. These hail from the period when Buddhist art underwent a phase of Hellenistic influence. Numerous sphinxes can be seen on the gateways of Bharhut stupa, dating to the 1st century B.C.

In South India, the "sphinx" is known as puruṣamr̥ga (Sanskrit) or purushamirugam (Tamil), meaning "human-animal". It is found depicted in sculptural art in temples and palaces where it serves an apotropaic purpose, just as the "sphinxes" in other parts of the ancient world. It is said by the tradition, to take away the sins of the devotees when they enter a temple and to ward off evil in general. It is therefore often found in a strategic position on the gopuram or temple gateway, or near the entrance of the sanctum sanctorum.

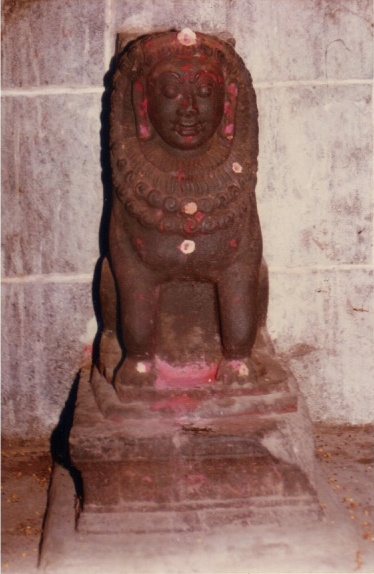
Male purushamriga or Indian sphinx guarding the entrance of the Shri Shiva Nataraja temple in Chidambaram

The puruṣamr̥ga plays a significant role in daily as well as yearly ritual of South Indian Hindu temples. In the Shodhasha-Upakaara (or sixteen honors) ritual, performed between one and six times at significant sacred moments through the day, it decorates one of the lamps of the Deepaaradhana or lamp ceremony. And in several temples the puruṣamr̥ga is also one of the vahana or vehicles of the deity during the processions of the Brahmotsava or festival.

In Kanyakumari district, in the southernmost tip of the Indian subcontinent, during the night of Maha Shivaratri, devotees run 75 kilometres while visiting and worshiping at twelve Shiva temples. This Shiva Ottam or Running for Shiva is performed in commemoration of the story of the race between the Purushamirugam and Bhima, one of the Pandavas of the Hindu Epic Mahabharata.

The Indian conception of a sphinx that comes closest to the classic Greco-Roman idea is the Sharabha and Gandabherunda, two mythical creatures, part lion, part human, part mammal and part bird, and the form of Sharabha that god Shiva took on and fought with the god Vishnu as Narasimha and Shiva as Sharabha was killed by Vishnu as Gandabherunda in the form of Narashima when Narashima killed Hiranyakashipu.

In Sri Lanka and India, the sphinx is known as narasimha or human-lion. As a sphinx, it has the body of a lion and the head of a human being, and is not to be confused with Narasimha, the fourth incarnation of the deity Vishnu; this avatara or incarnation of Vishnu has a human body and the head of a lion and Vishnu as Narashima killed Hiranyakashipu. The "sphinx" narasimha is part of the Buddhist tradition and functions as a guardian of the northern direction and also was depicted on banners.

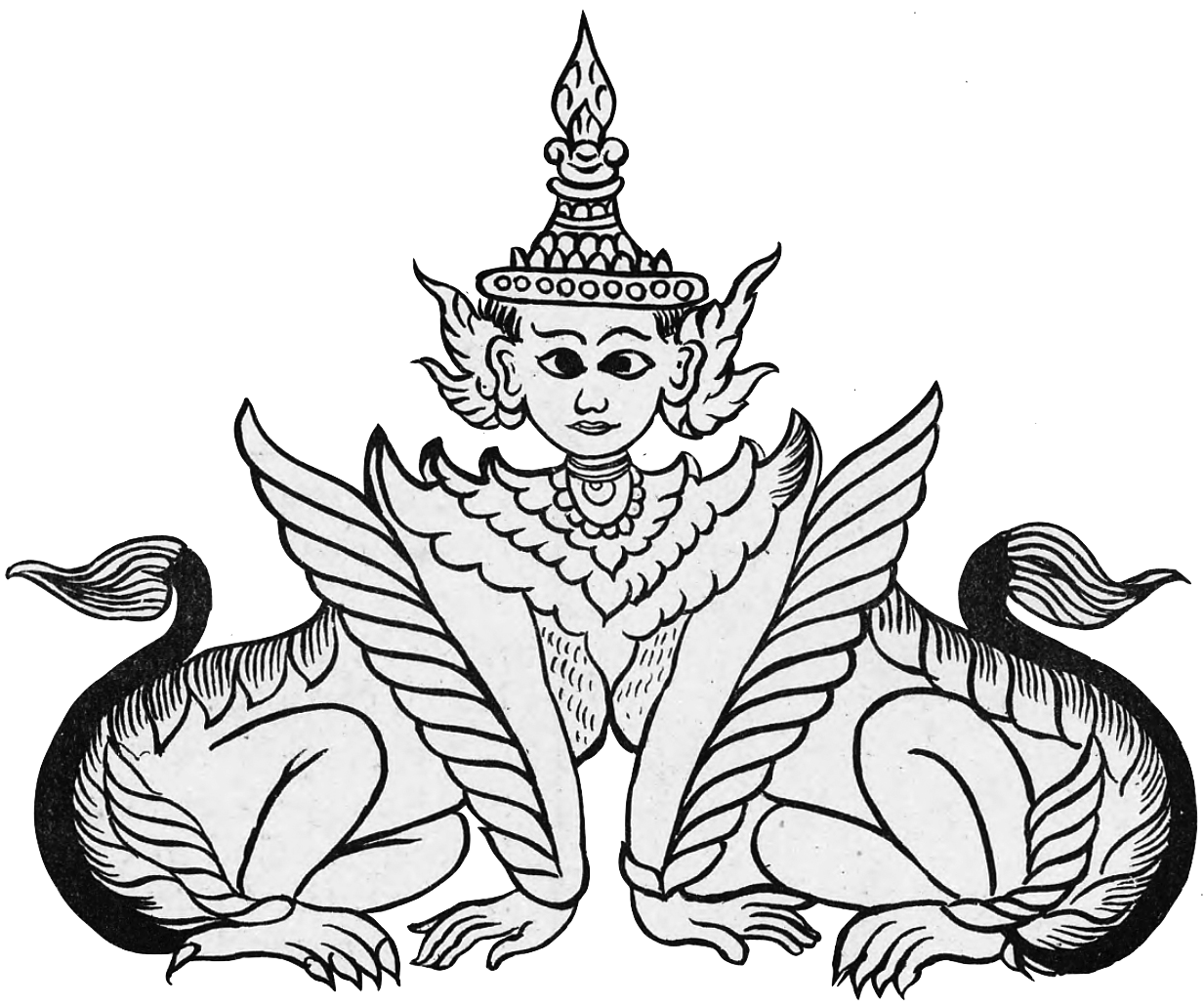
Burmese depiction of the Manussiha

In Burma (Myanmar), the sphinx-like statue, with a human head and two lion hindquarters, is known as Manussiha (manuthiha). It is depicted on the corners of Buddhist stupas, and its legends tell how it was created by Buddhist monks to protect a new-born royal baby from being devoured by ogresses.

Nora Nair, Norasingha and Thep Norasingha are three of the names under which the "sphinx" is known in Thailand. They are depicted as upright walking beings with the lower body of a lion or deer, and the upper body of a human. Often they are found as female-male pairs. Here, too, the sphinx serves a protective function. It also is enumerated among the mythological creatures that inhabit the ranges of the sacred mountain Himapan.

=== Japanese literature ===
Giorgio Amitrano's Echoes of Ancient Greek Myths in Murakami Haruki's novels and in Other Works of Contemporary Japanese Literature explores how Haruki Murakami's Kafka on the Shore shares thematic elements of decadence with Oedipus' myth and parallels the protagonist's journey to self-discovery. The Sphinx motif present within the novel is established through the enigmatic creature of Murakami's design, Oshima: a mysterious, omnipotent being who has the protagonist grapple with the concept of a meaningless existence in turn of searching for authenticity by disconnecting from societal conventions of wealth and status. He tests the durability of character of the novel's protagonists through a series of tests that may challenge their perception of truth regarding their existence.

=== Burmese literature ===
Lowell Edmunds' Oedipus in Burma is an explorative look on the Oedipus' myth in Burmese literature and culture. The folktale Pauk and the Dragon uses similar motifs from the Greek myth to explore Pauk's, the protagonist, road to destiny and fulfilling the quests needed to defeat the dragon: the Sphinx motif. Using intelligence, courage, and determination, Pauk defeats the dragon but not before facing the consequences of the knowledge he acquired on his journey. Decadent themes of fate, destiny, tragedy, mystery, and identity present themselves in the Burmese adaptations of Greek myths, in this case, it is Oedipus and the Sphinx.

== Freemasonry ==
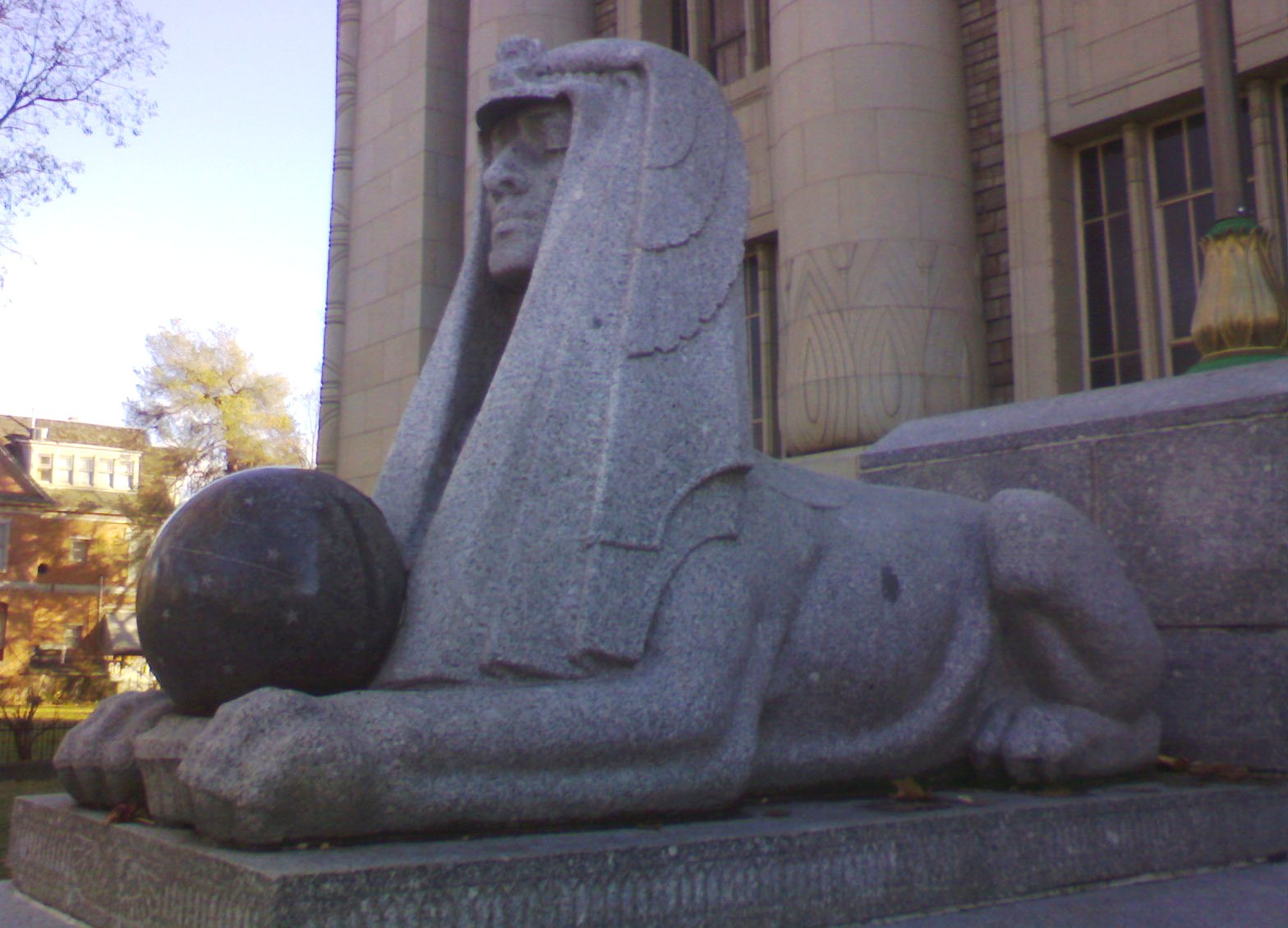
Sphinx adopted as an emblem in Masonic architecture

The sphinx imagery has historically been adopted into Masonic architecture and symbolism.

Among the Egyptians, sphinxes were placed at the entrance of the temples to guard their mysteries, by warning those who penetrated within that they should conceal a knowledge of them from the uninitiated. Champollion said that the sphinx became successively the symbol of each of the gods. The placement of the sphinxes expressed the idea that all the gods were hidden from the people, and that the knowledge of them, guarded in the sanctuaries, was revealed to initiates only.

As a Masonic emblem, the sphinx has been adopted as a symbol of mystery, and as such often is found as a decoration sculptured in front of Masonic temples, or engraved at the head of Masonic documents.

== Similar hybrid creatures ==
=== With feline features ===
- Gopaitioshah – The Persian Gopat or Gopaitioshah is another creature that is similar to the Sphinx, being a winged bull or lion with human face. The Gopat have been represented in ancient art of Iran since late second millennium BC, and was a common symbol for dominant royal power in ancient Iran. Gopats were common motifs in the art of Elamite period, Luristan, North and North West region of Iran in Iron Age, and Achaemenid art, and can be found in texts such as the Bundahishn, the Dadestan-i Denig, the Menog-i Khrad, as well as in collections of tales, such as the Matikan-e yusht faryan and in its Islamic replication, the Marzubannama.
- Löwenmensch figurine – The 32,000-year-old Aurignacian Löwenmensch figurine, also known as "lion-human", is the oldest known anthropomorphic statue, discovered in the Hohlenstein-Stadel, a German cave in 1939.
- Manticore – The Manticore (Early Middle Persian: Mardyakhor or Martikhwar, "man-eater") is a Persian legendary hybrid creature and another similar creature to the sphinx.
- Narasimha – Narasimha ("human-lion") is an incarnation (Avatara) of Vishnu in Hinduism in the Dashavatara of Vishnu who takes the form of half-man/half-Asiatic lion, having a human torso and lower body, but with a lion-like face and claws and in this avatara, Vishnu killed Hiranyakashipu as Narashima and saved the world from chaos in Hindu Mythology.
- Urmahlullu – Lion-centaurs, represented as sphinxes with arms, are attested in ancient Assyria as Urmahlullu, having a lion body below the waist and a human body above the waist.

=== Without feline features ===
- In ancient Assyria, bas-reliefs of shedu bulls with the crowned bearded heads of kings guarded the entrances of temples.
- Many Greek mythological creatures who are archaic survivals of previous mythologies with respect to the classical Olympian mythology, like the centaurs, are similar to the Sphinx.

== Gallery ==
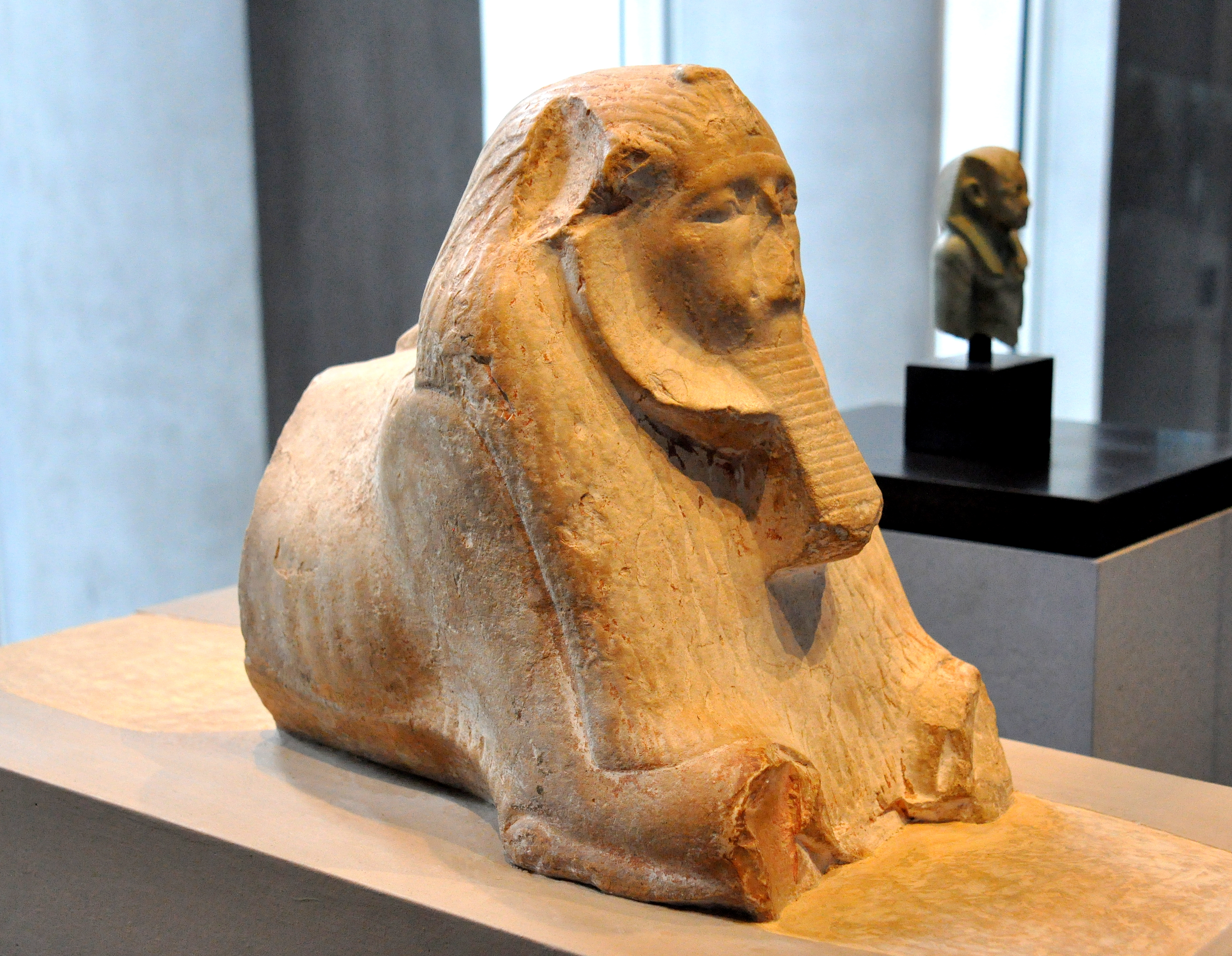
Maned sphinx of Amenemhat III. 12th Dynasty, c. 1800 BC. State Museum of Egyptian Art, Munich.

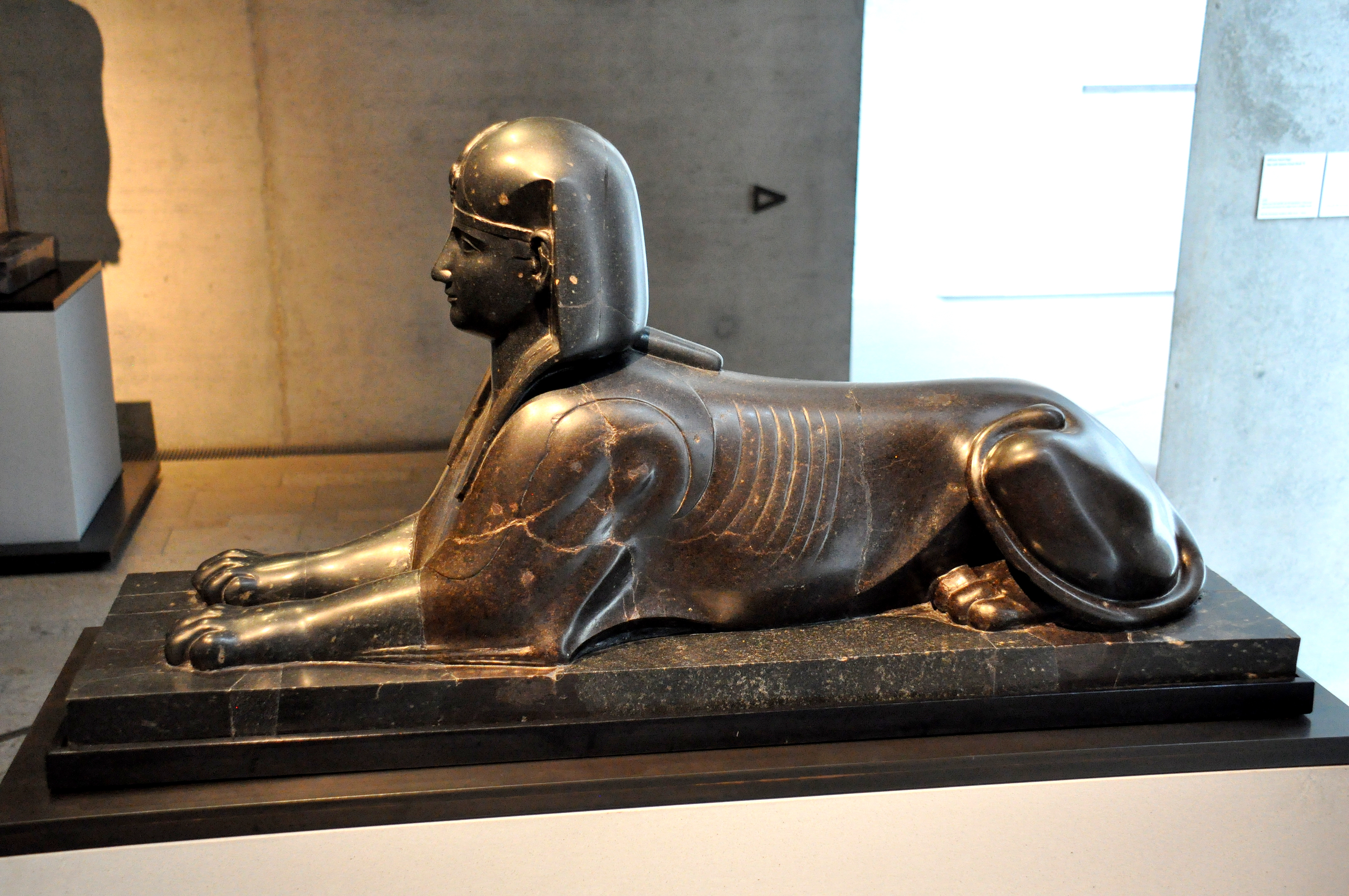
Egyptian sphinx from Hadrian's Villa at Tivoli. 1st century AD. State Museum of Egyptian Art, Munich.

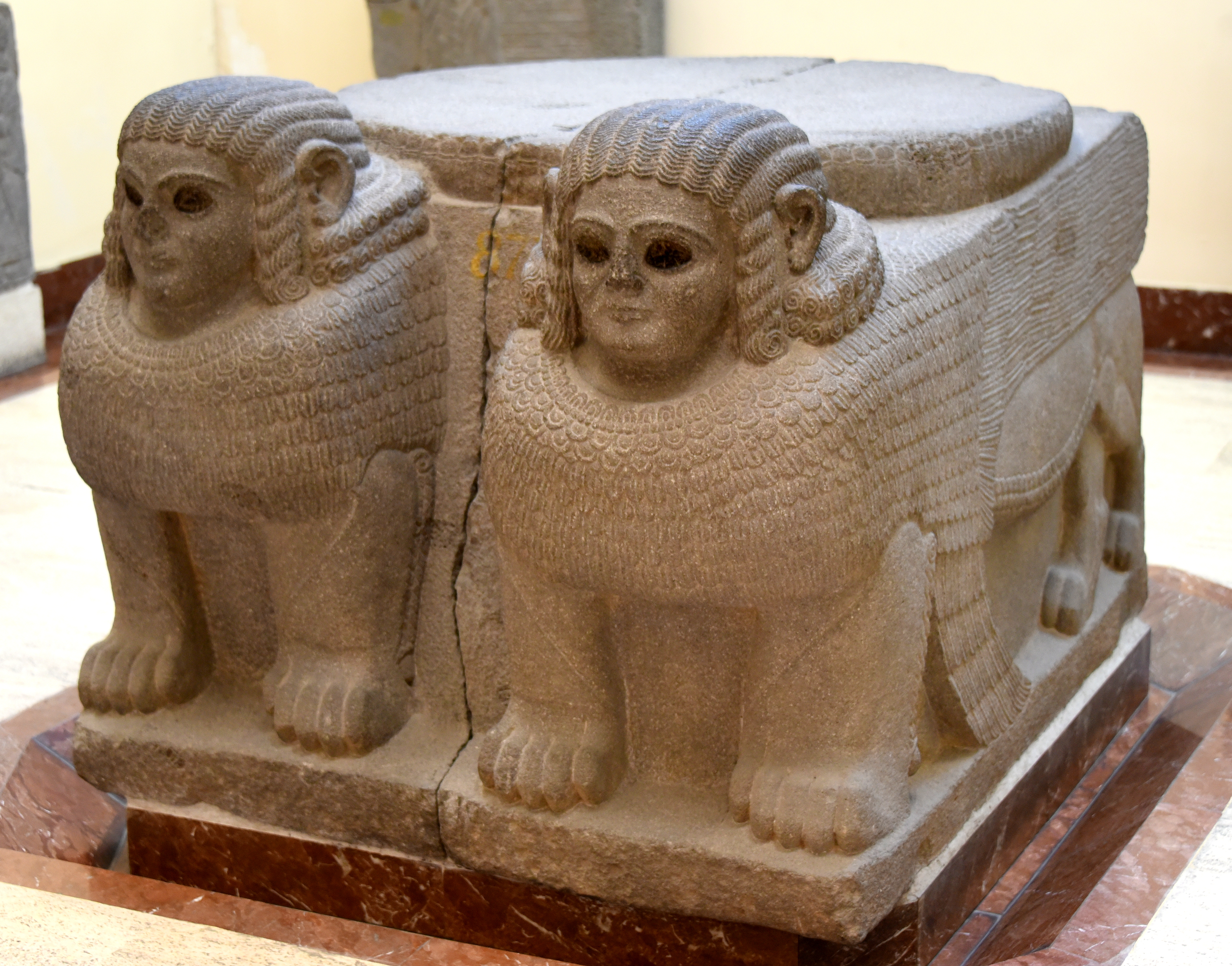
Column base in the shape of a double sphinx. From Sam'al. 8th century BC. Museum of the Ancient Orient, Istanbul.

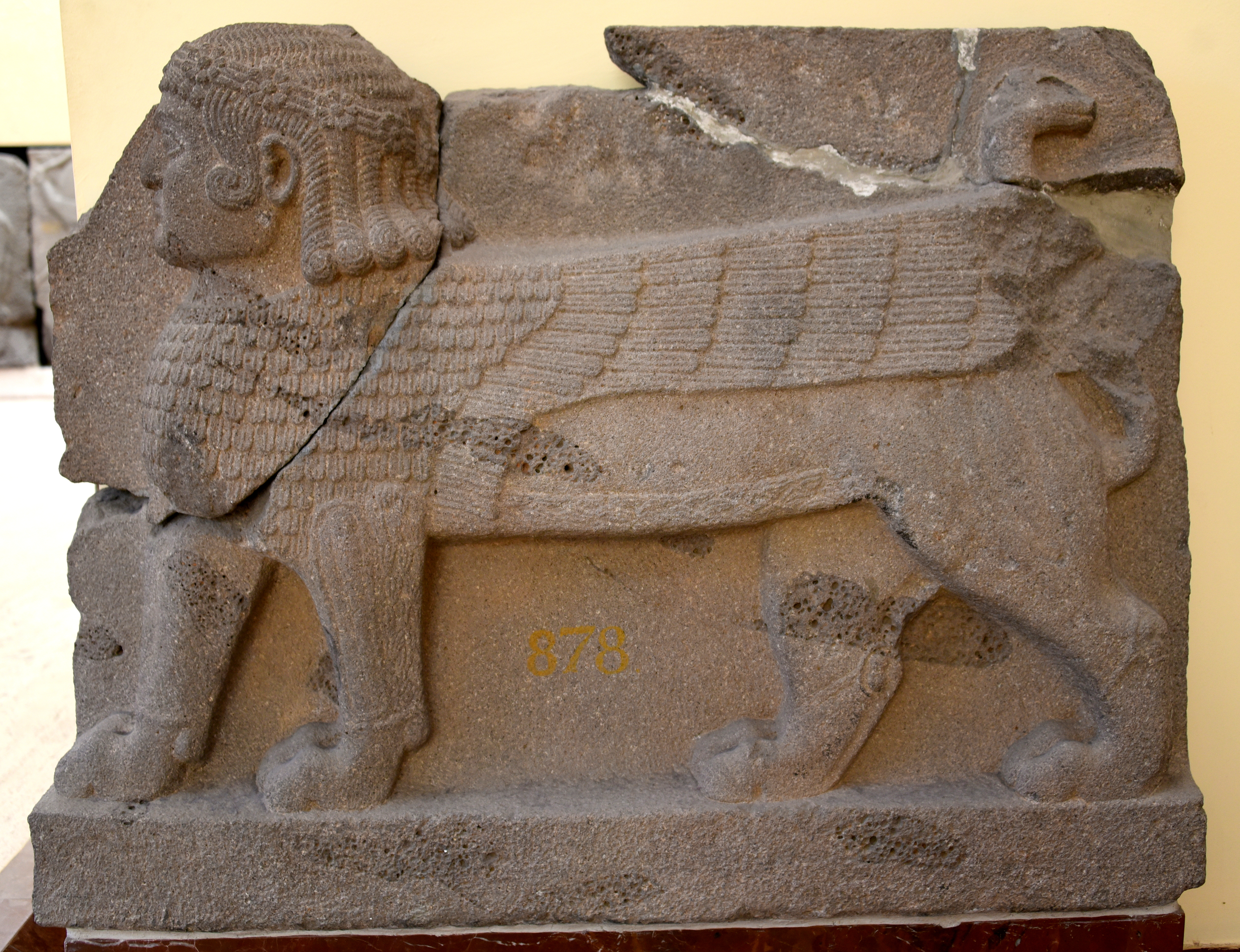
Hittite sphinx. Basalt. 8th century BC. From Sam'al. Museum of the Ancient Orient, Istanbul.

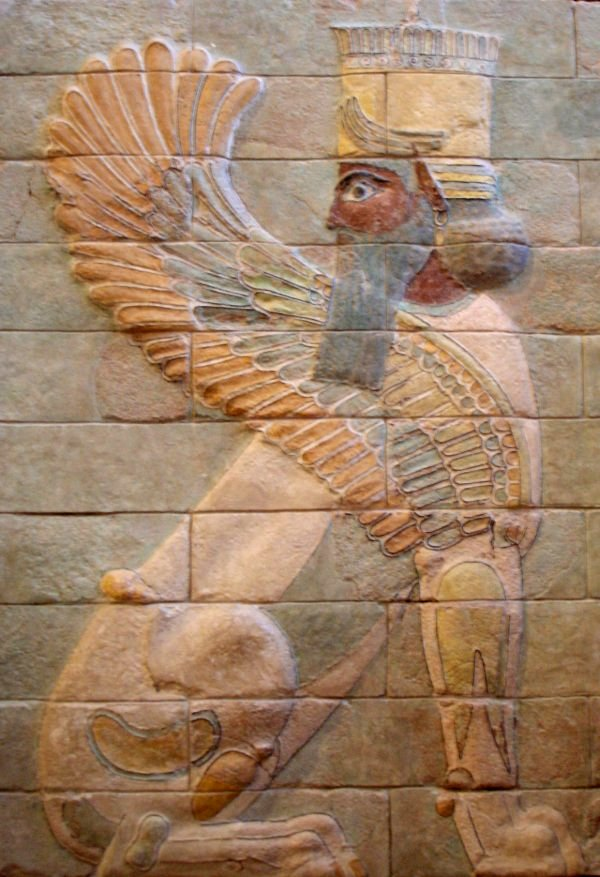
Winged sphinx from the palace of Darius the Great during Persian Empire at Susa (480 BC)

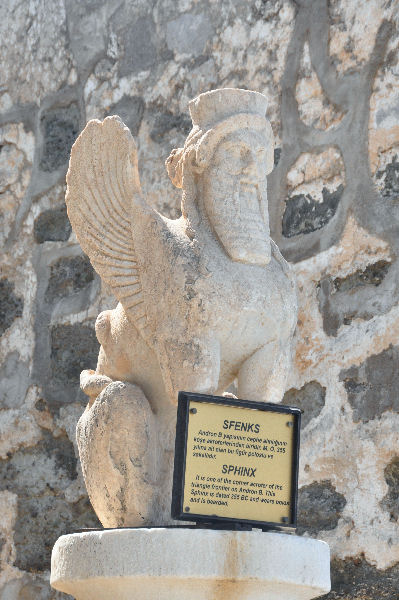
Achaemenid sphinx from Halicarnassus, capital of Caria, 355 BC. Found in Bodrum Castle, but possibly from the Mausoleum at Halicarnassus.

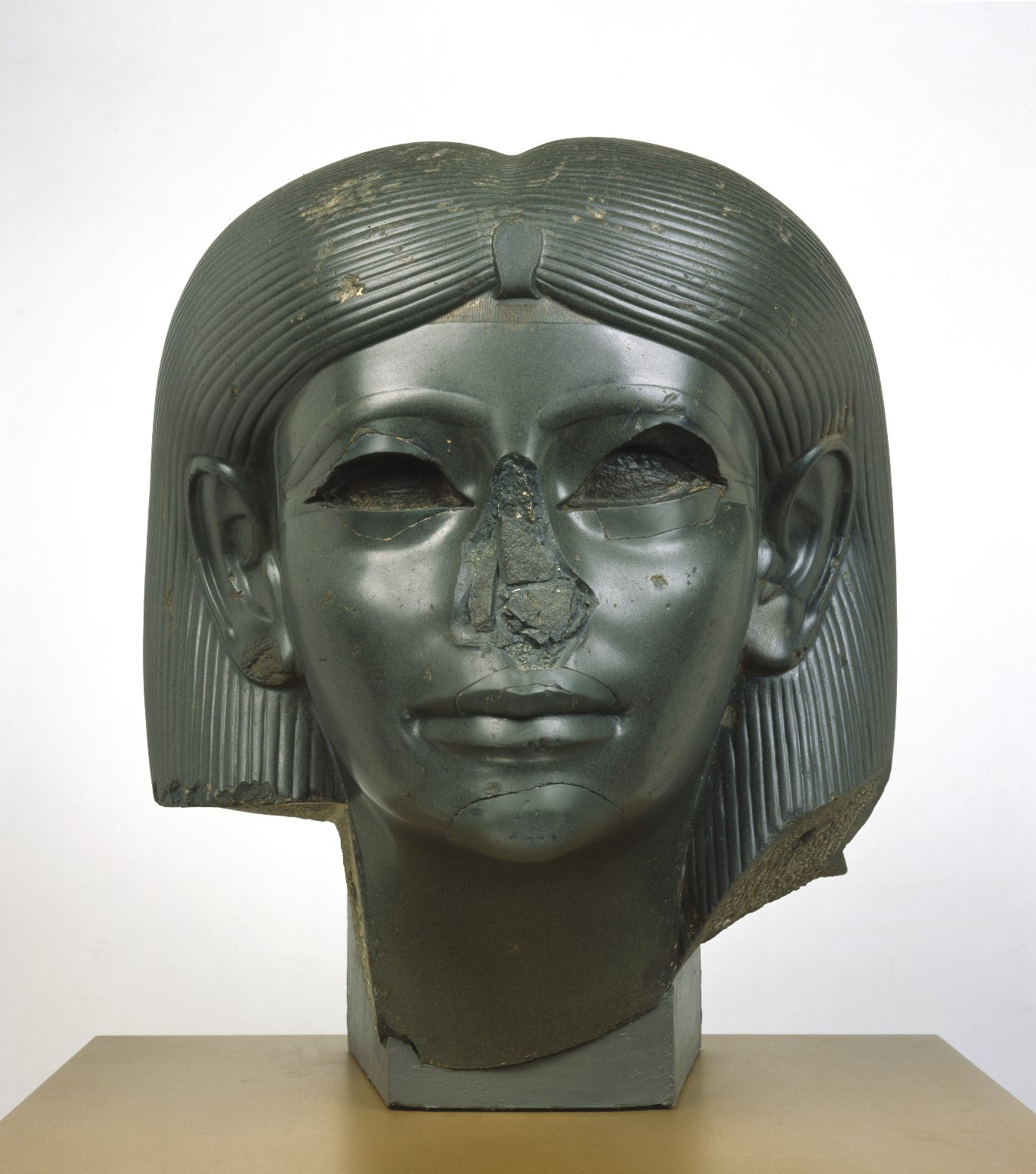
Head from a female sphinx, c. 1876–1842 BC, Brooklyn Museum

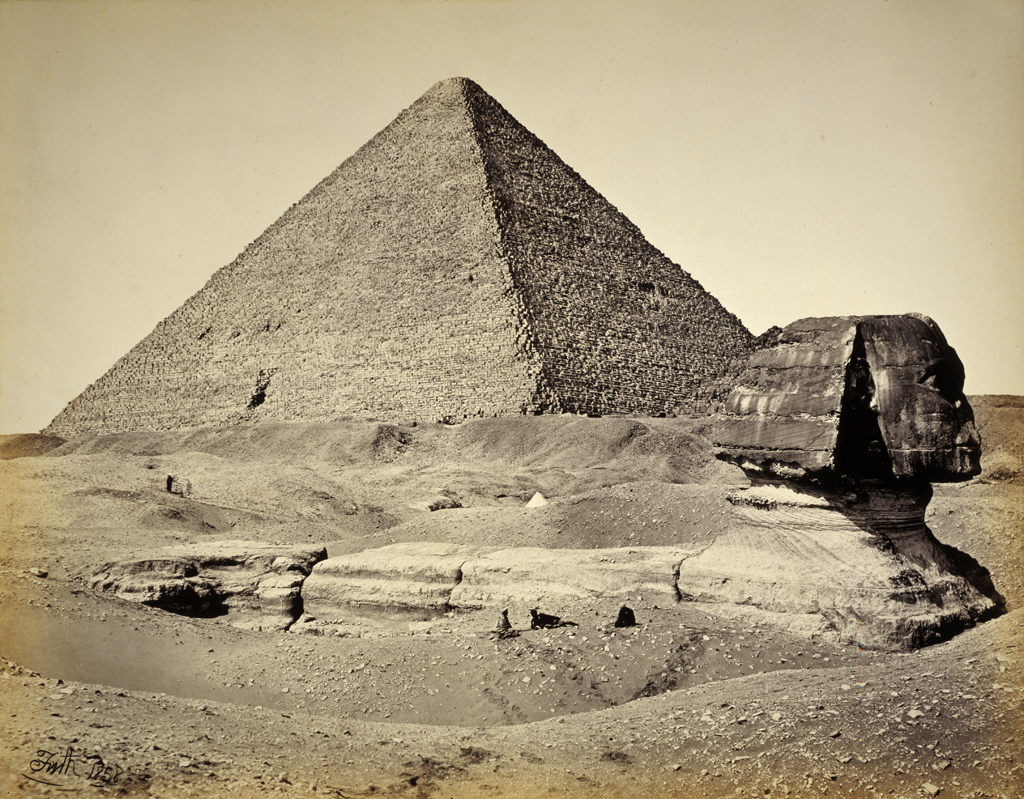
The Great Sphinx of Giza in 1858

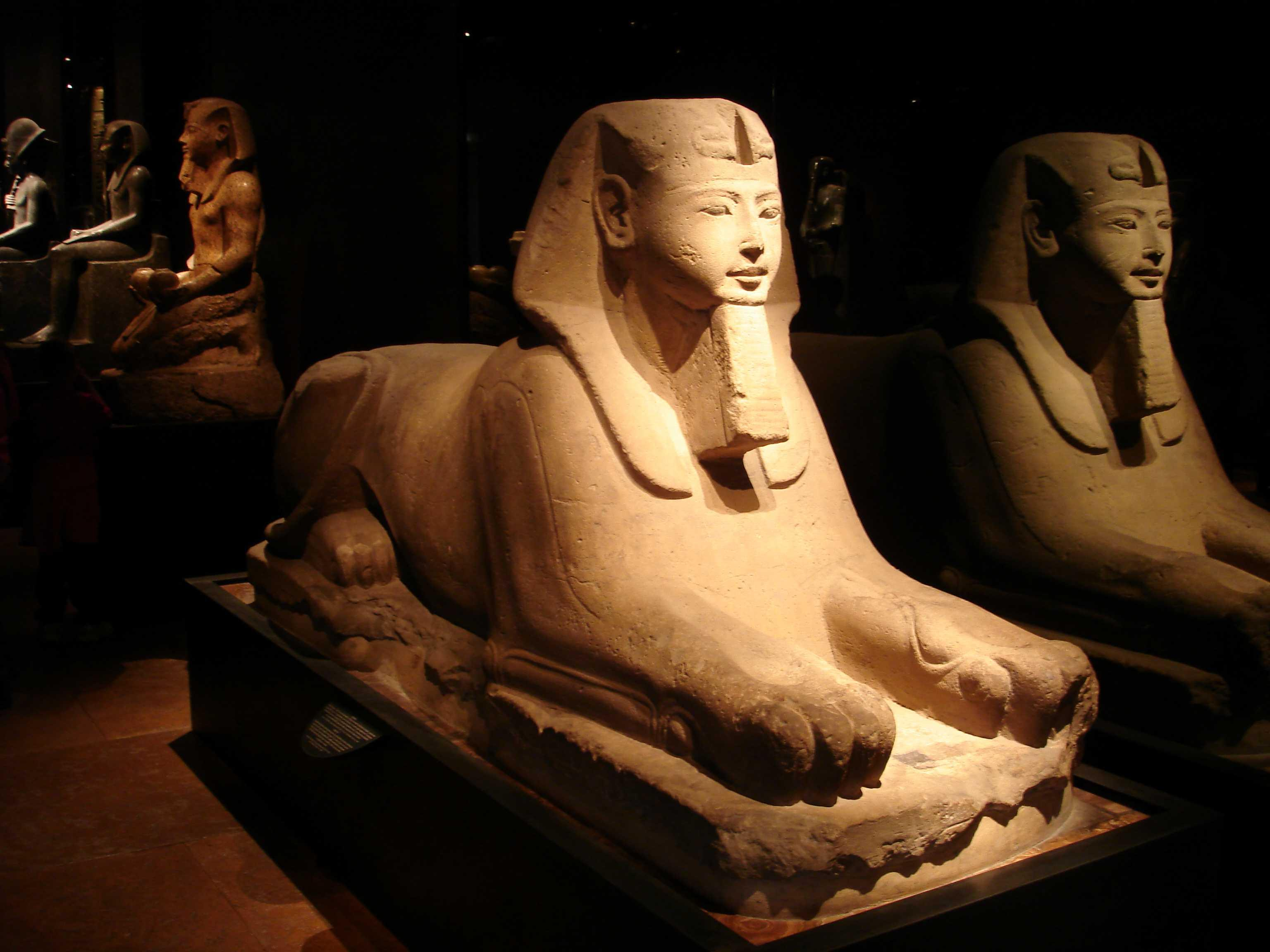
Typical Egyptian sphinx with a human head (Museo Egizio, Turin)

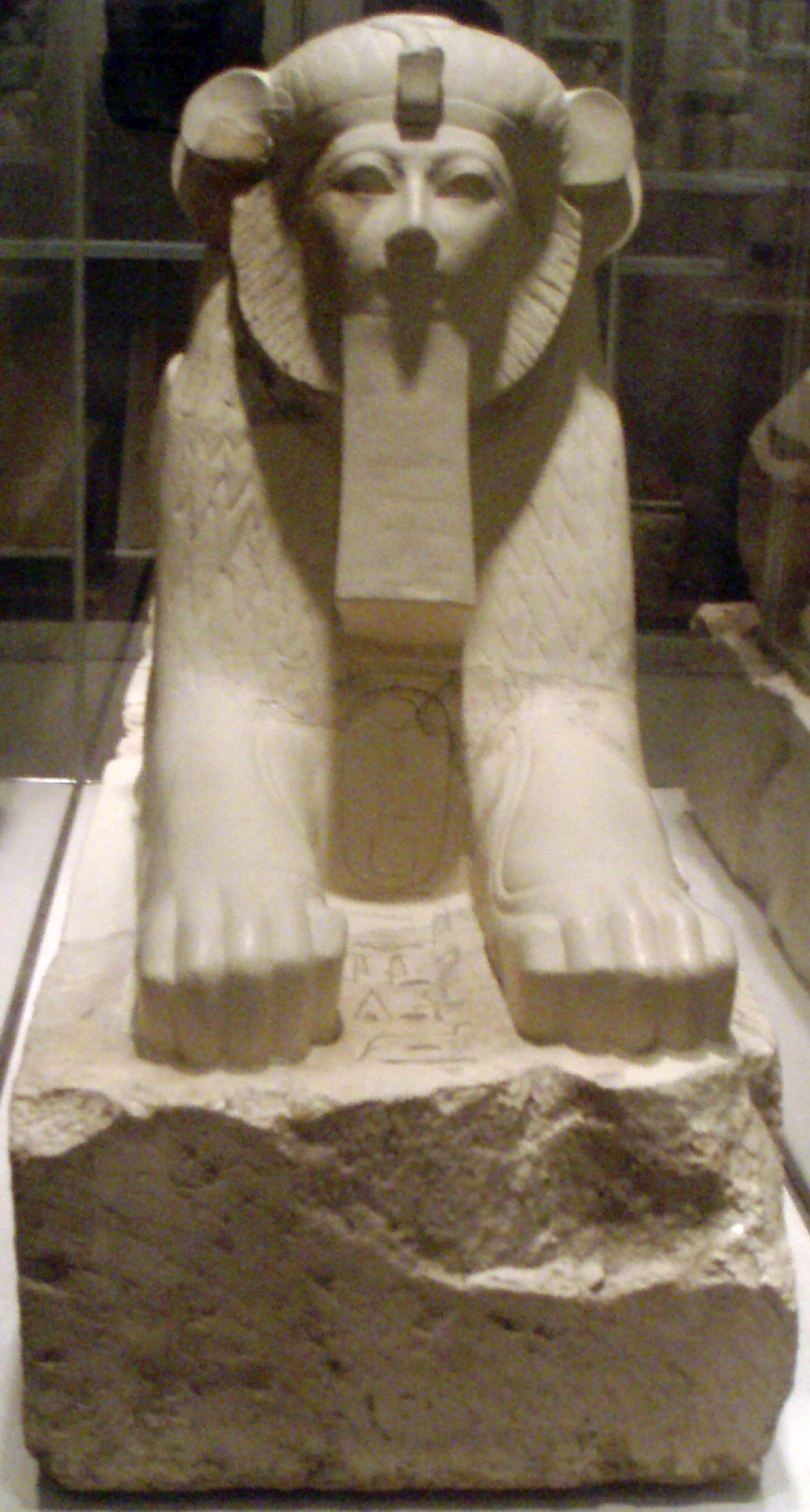
Sphinx of Egyptian pharaoh Hatshepsut with unusual ear and ruff features, 1503–1482

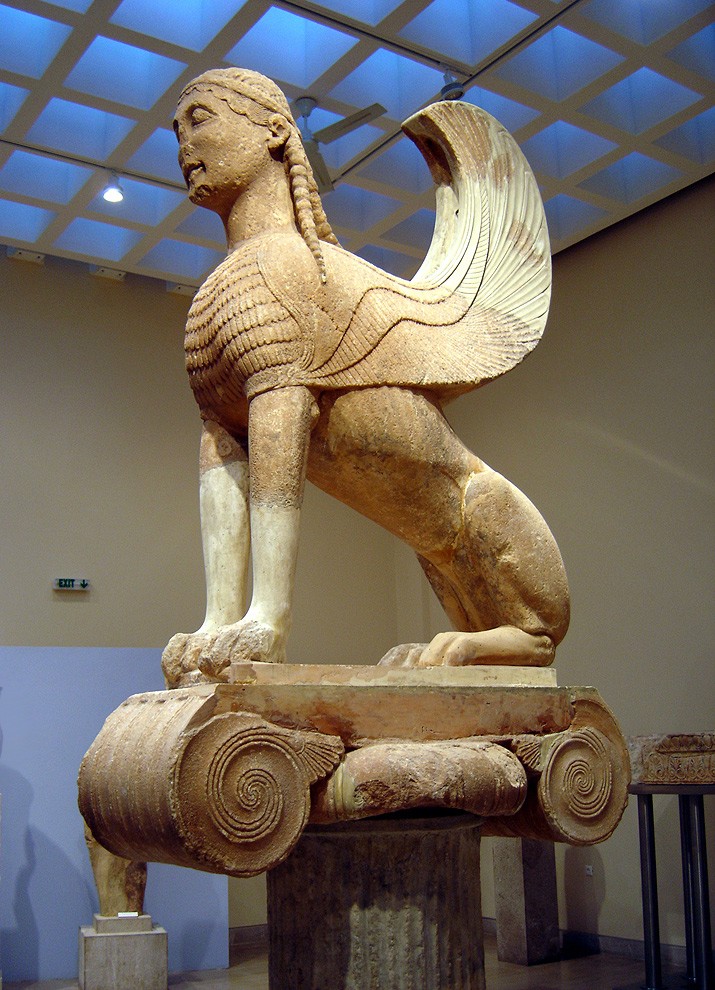
Ancient Greek sphinx from Delphi

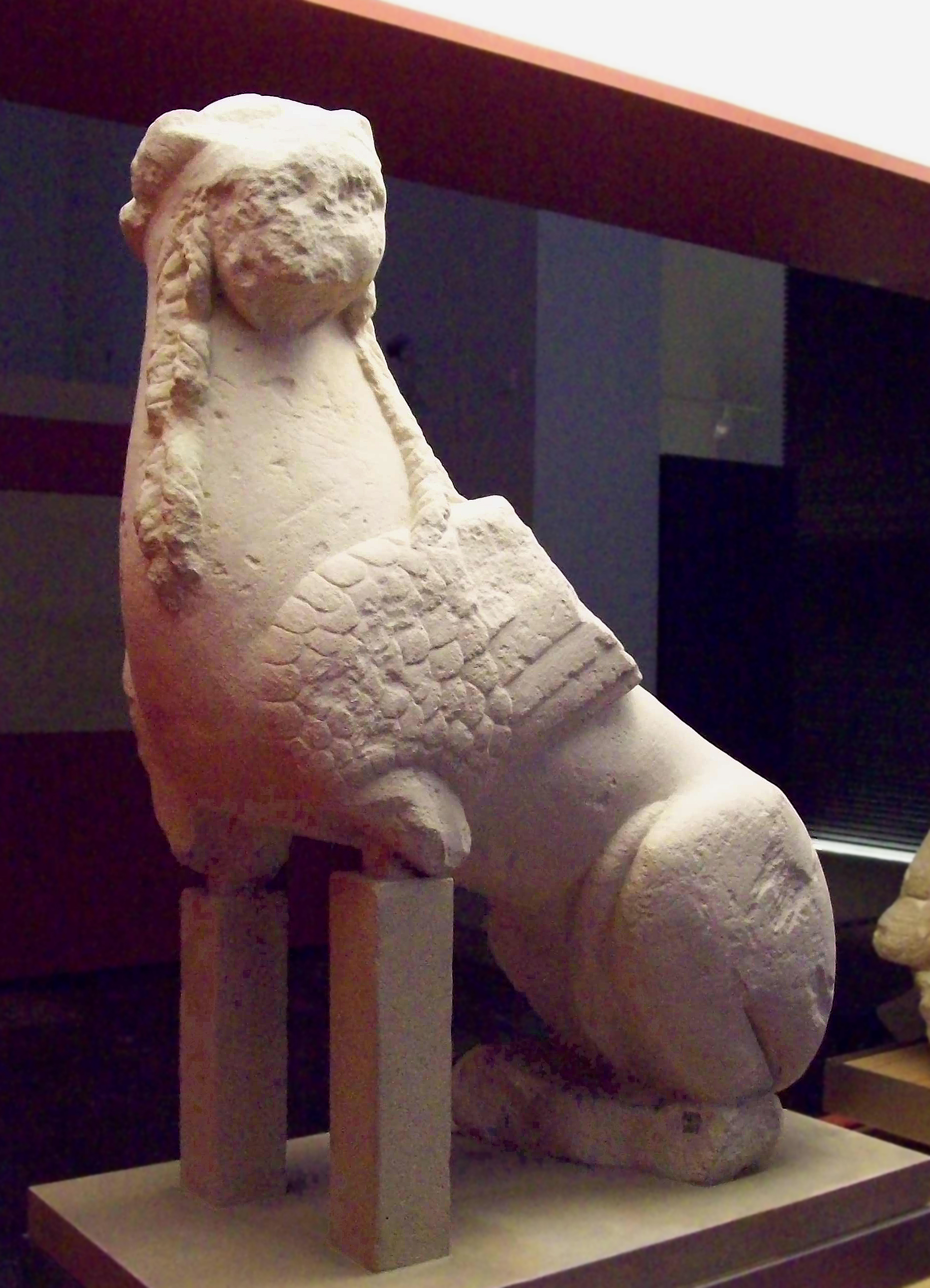
The Iberian Sphinx of Agost c. 570-545 BC, one of the many sphinxes found in Spain

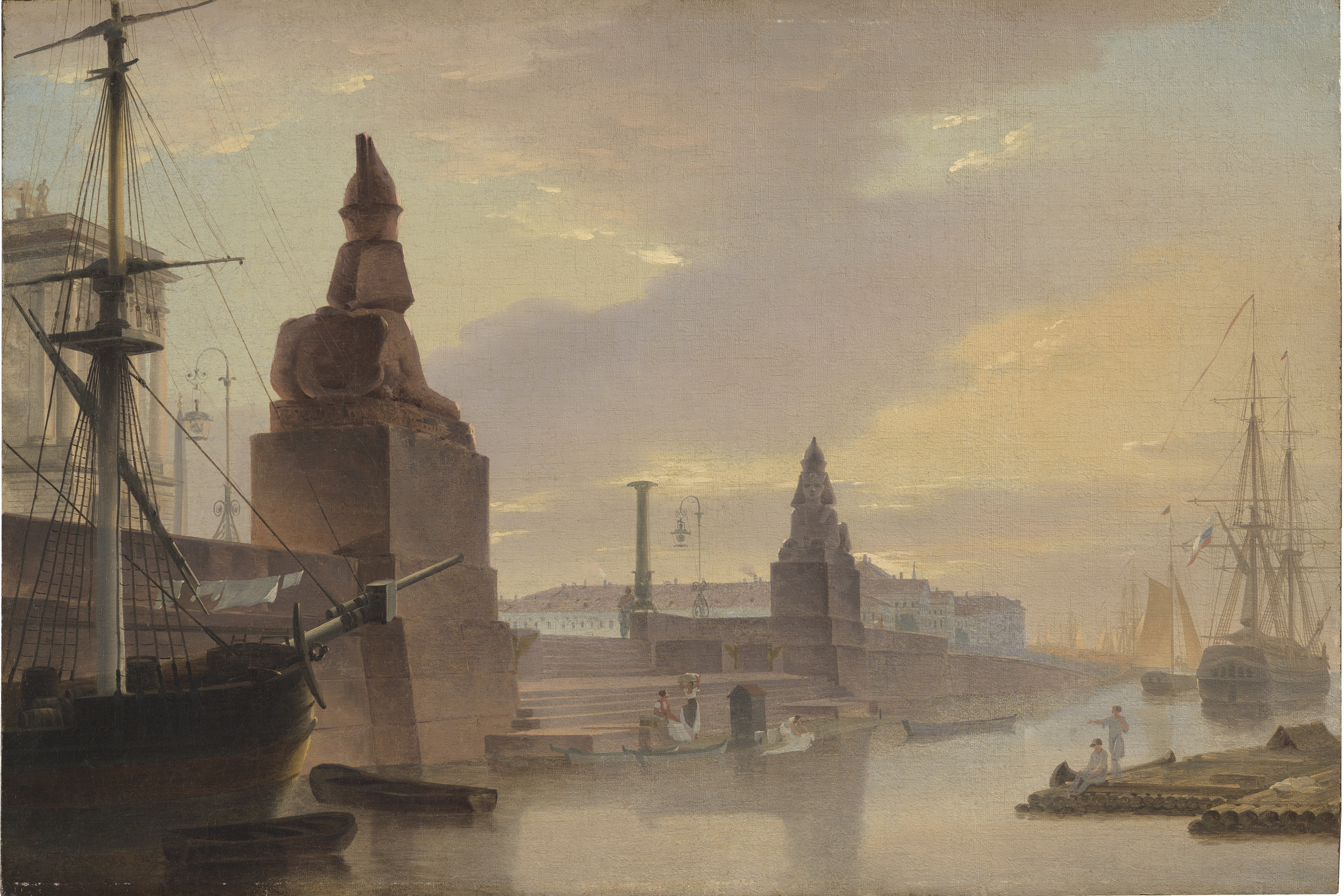
3000-year-old sphinxes were imported from Egypt to embellish public spaces in Saint Petersburg and other European capitals.

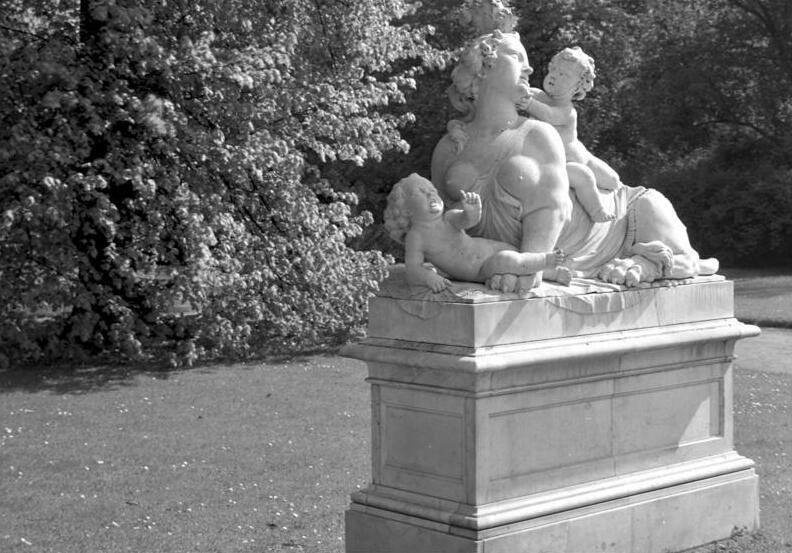
Park Sanssouci in Potsdam

Queluz wingless rococo sphinx

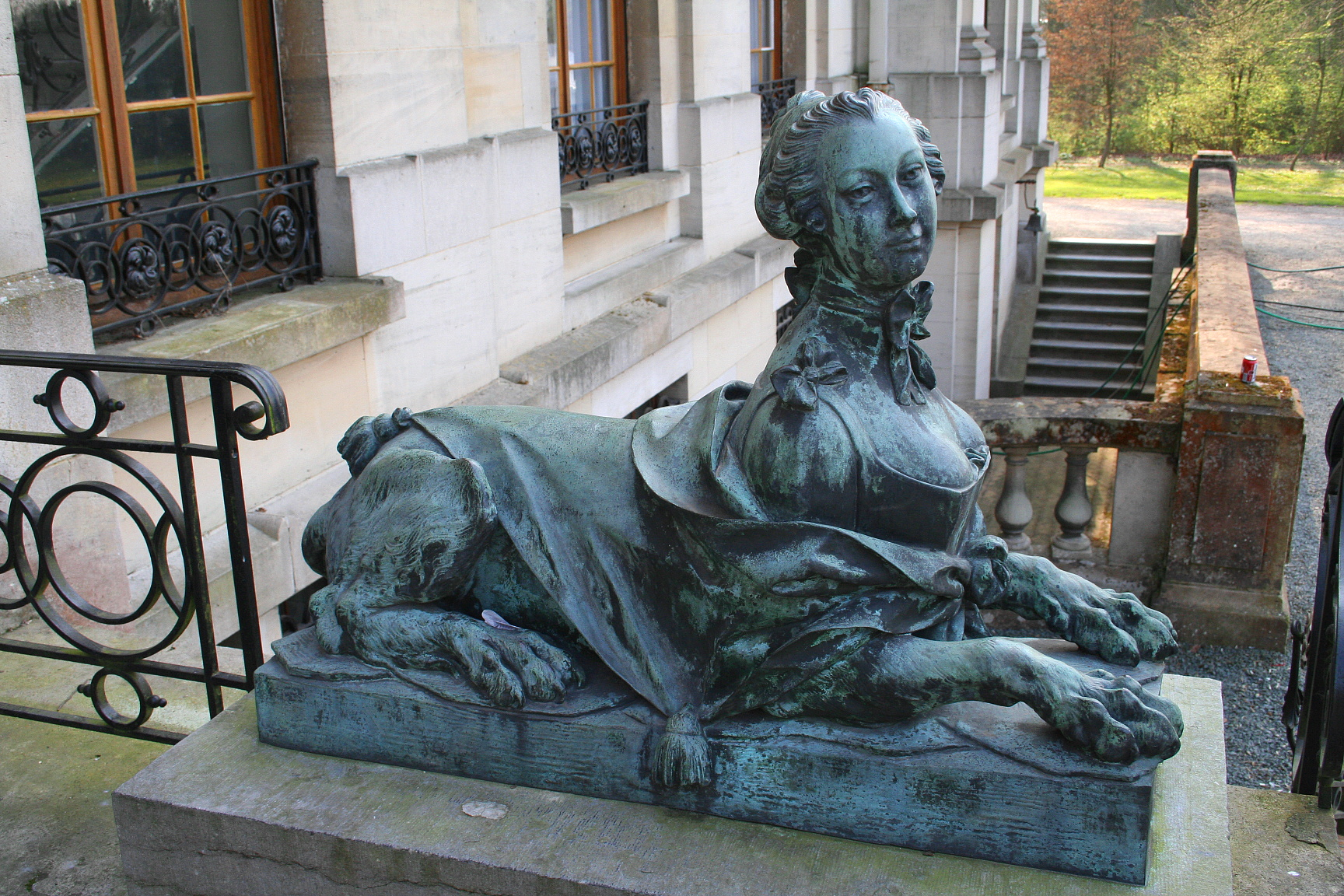
Classic Régence garden Sphinx in lead, Château Empain, the Parc d'Enghien, Belgium

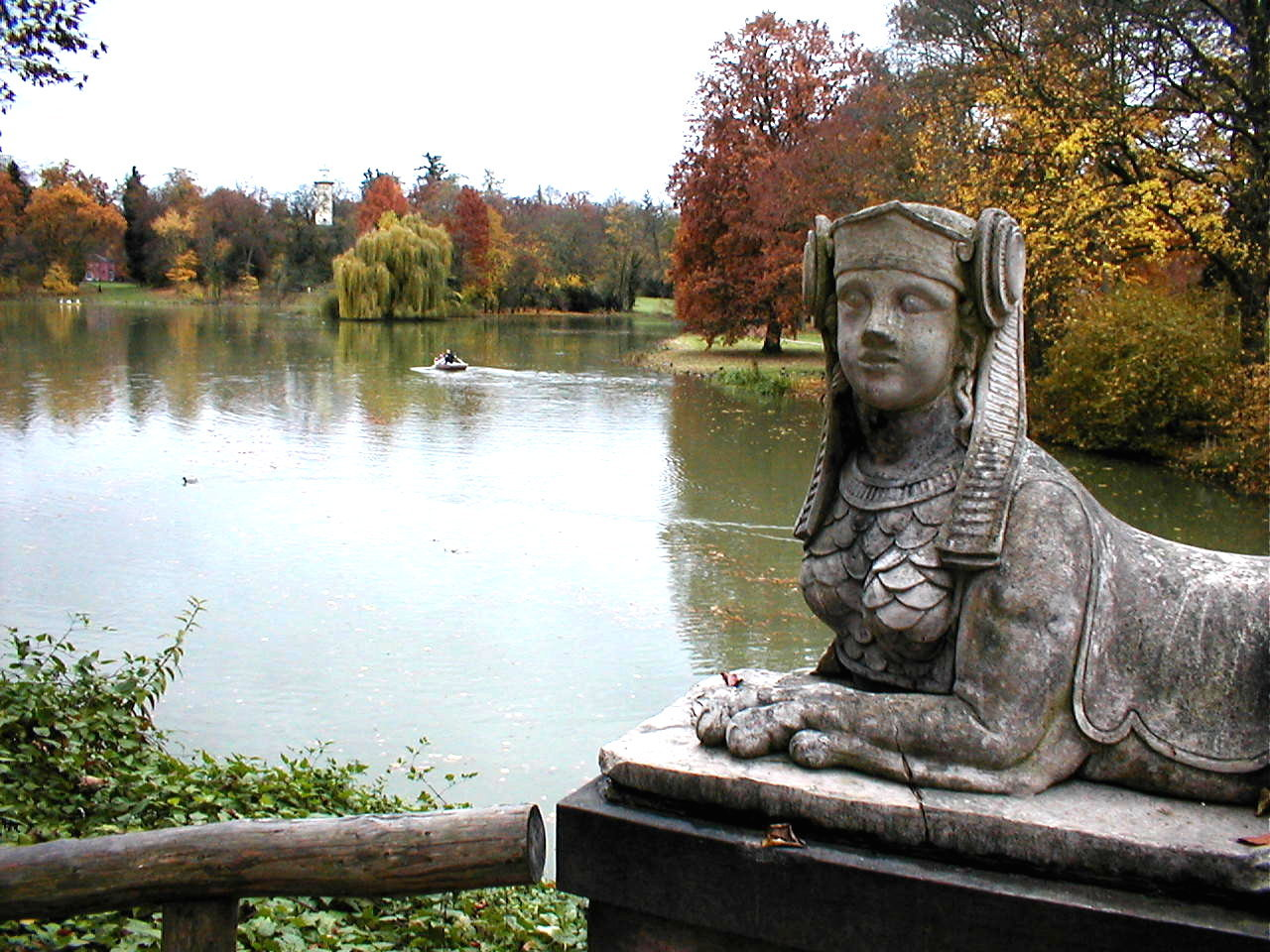
Park Schönbusch in Aschaffenburg, Bavaria, 1789–90

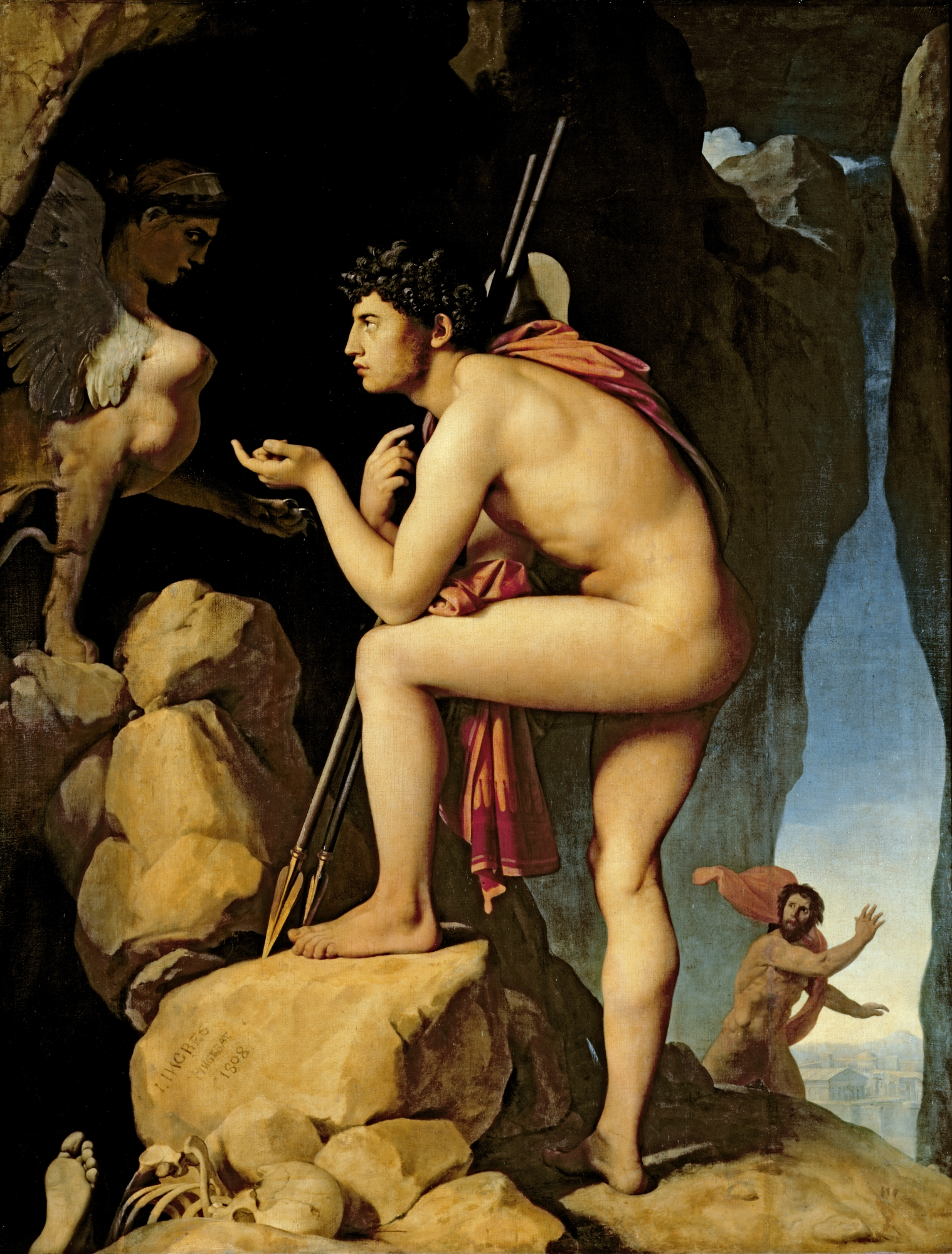
Ingres, Oedipus and the Sphinx, 1808, 1827

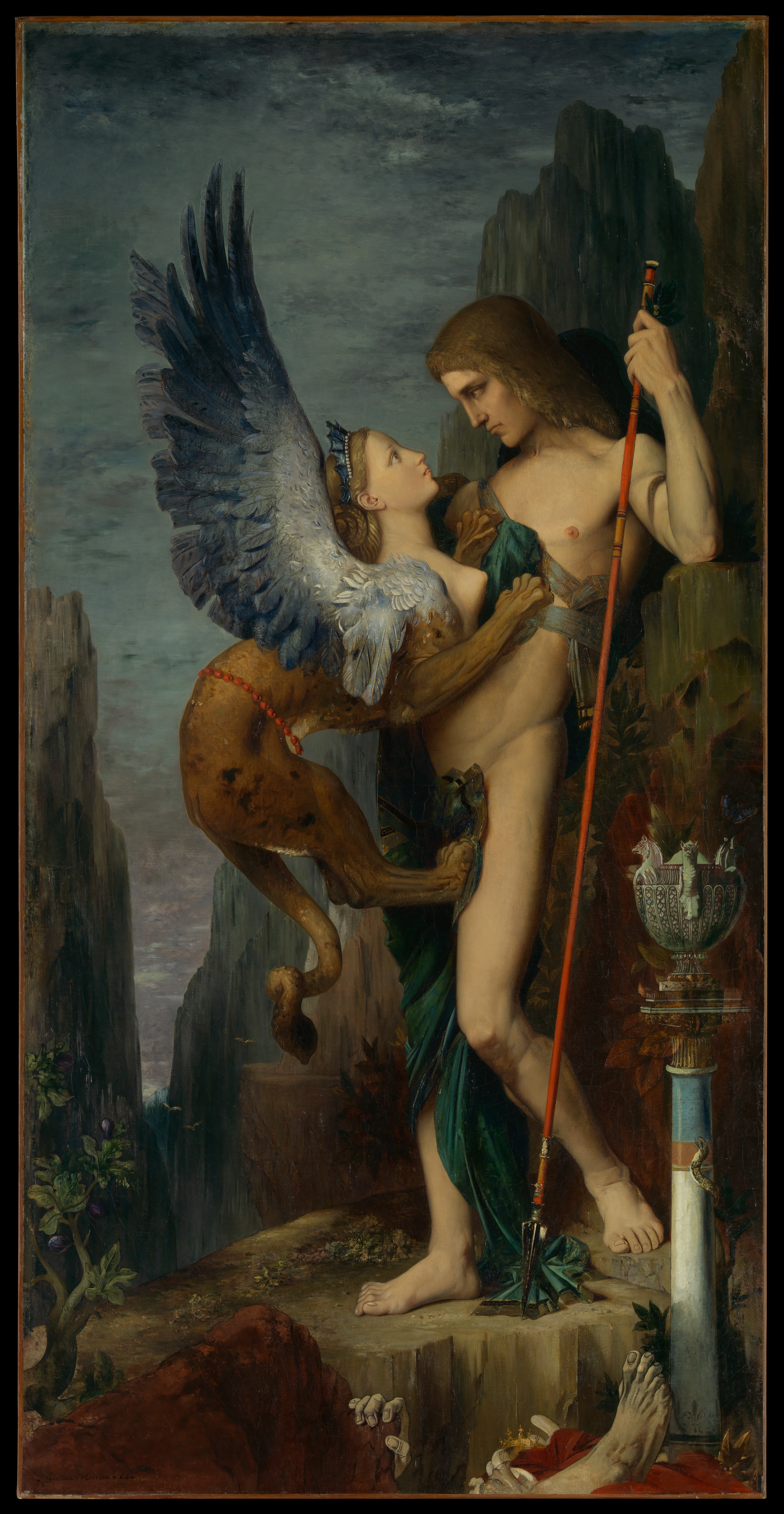
Oedipus and the Sphinx by Gustave Moreau, 1864

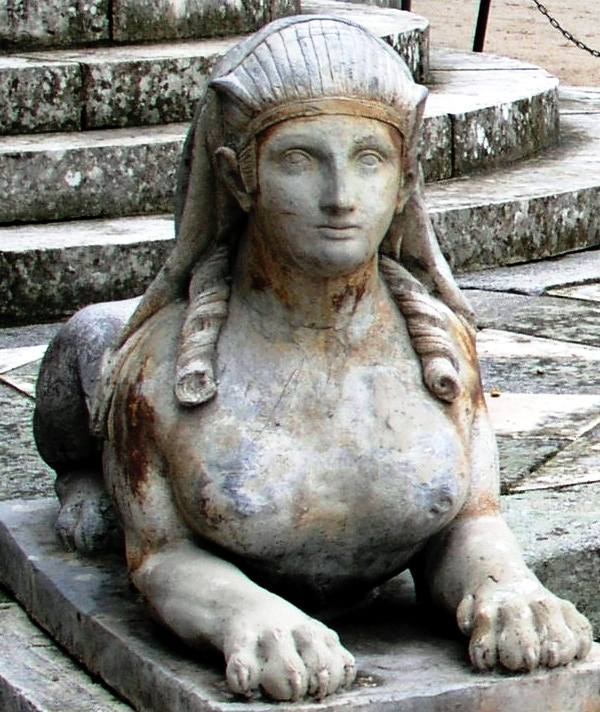
Sphinx at Plaza de los Emperadores (Parque de El Capricho, Madrid)

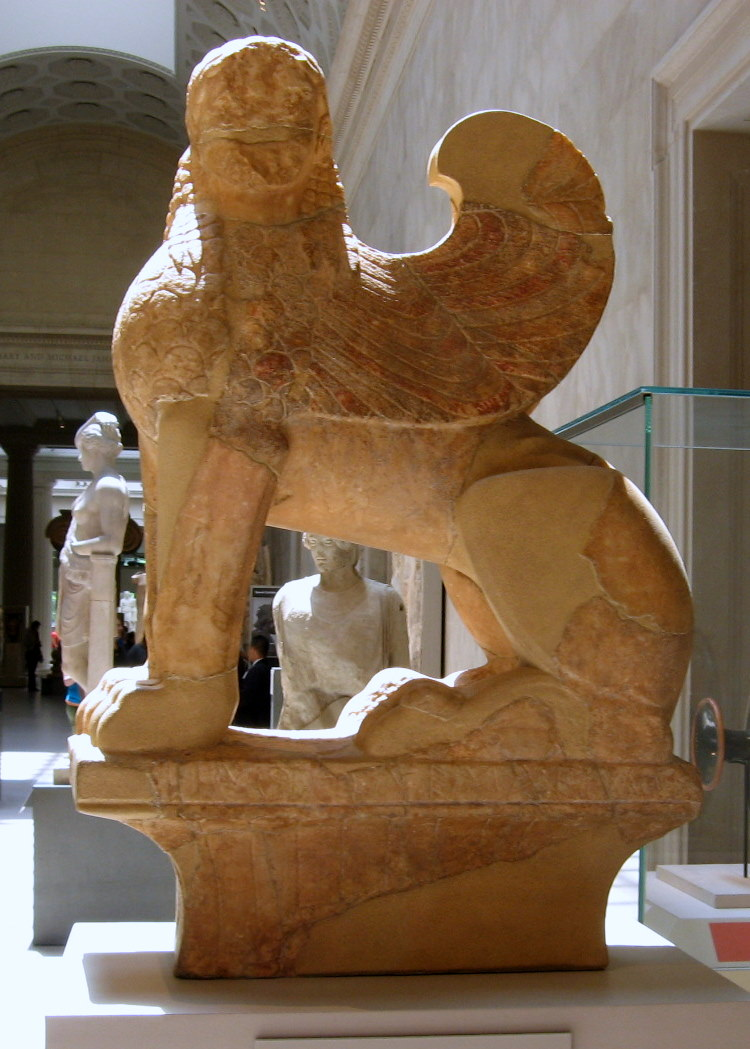
Marble sphinx on a cavetto capital, Attic, c. 580–575 BC

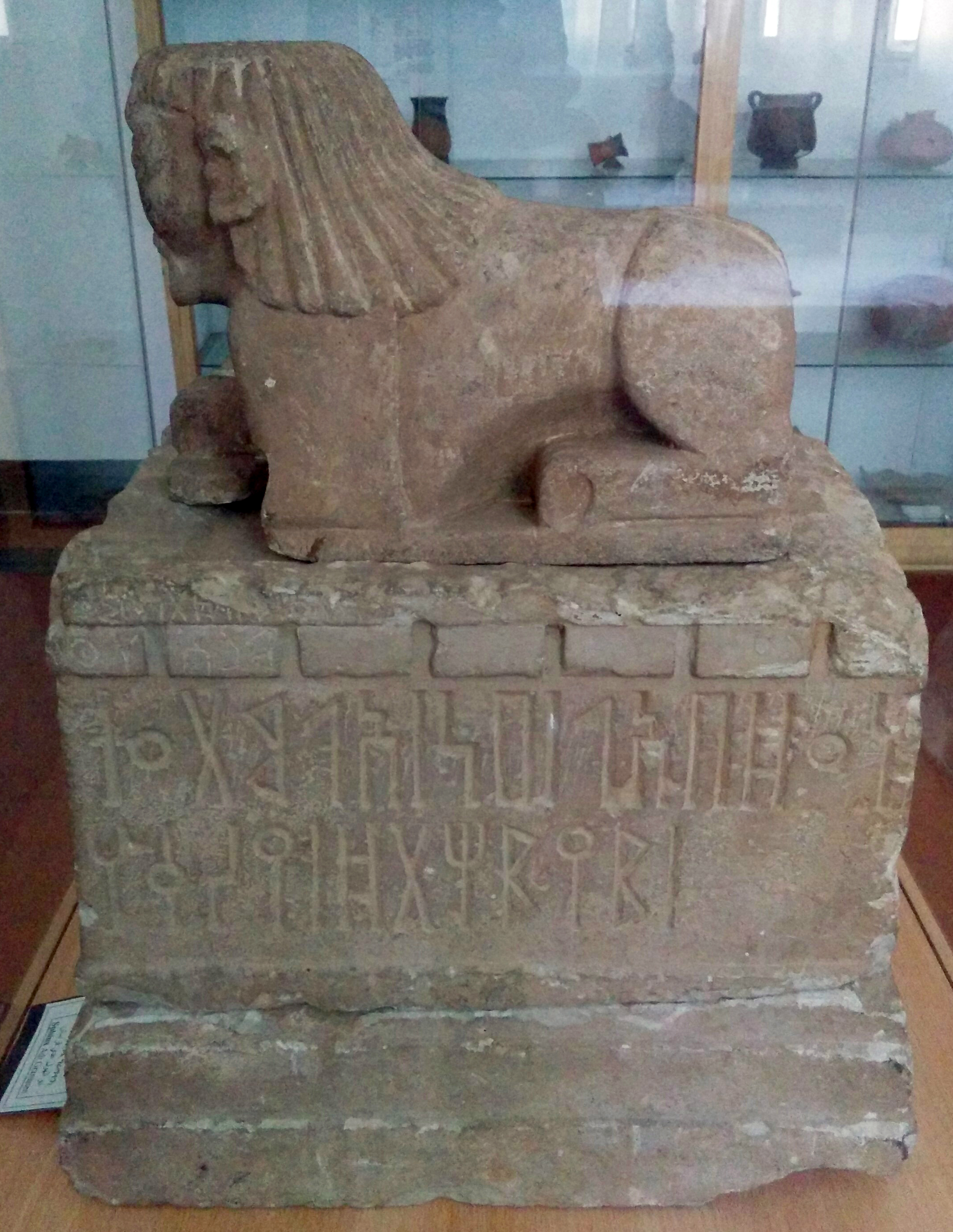
The Sphinx of Adi Gramaten, Eritrea

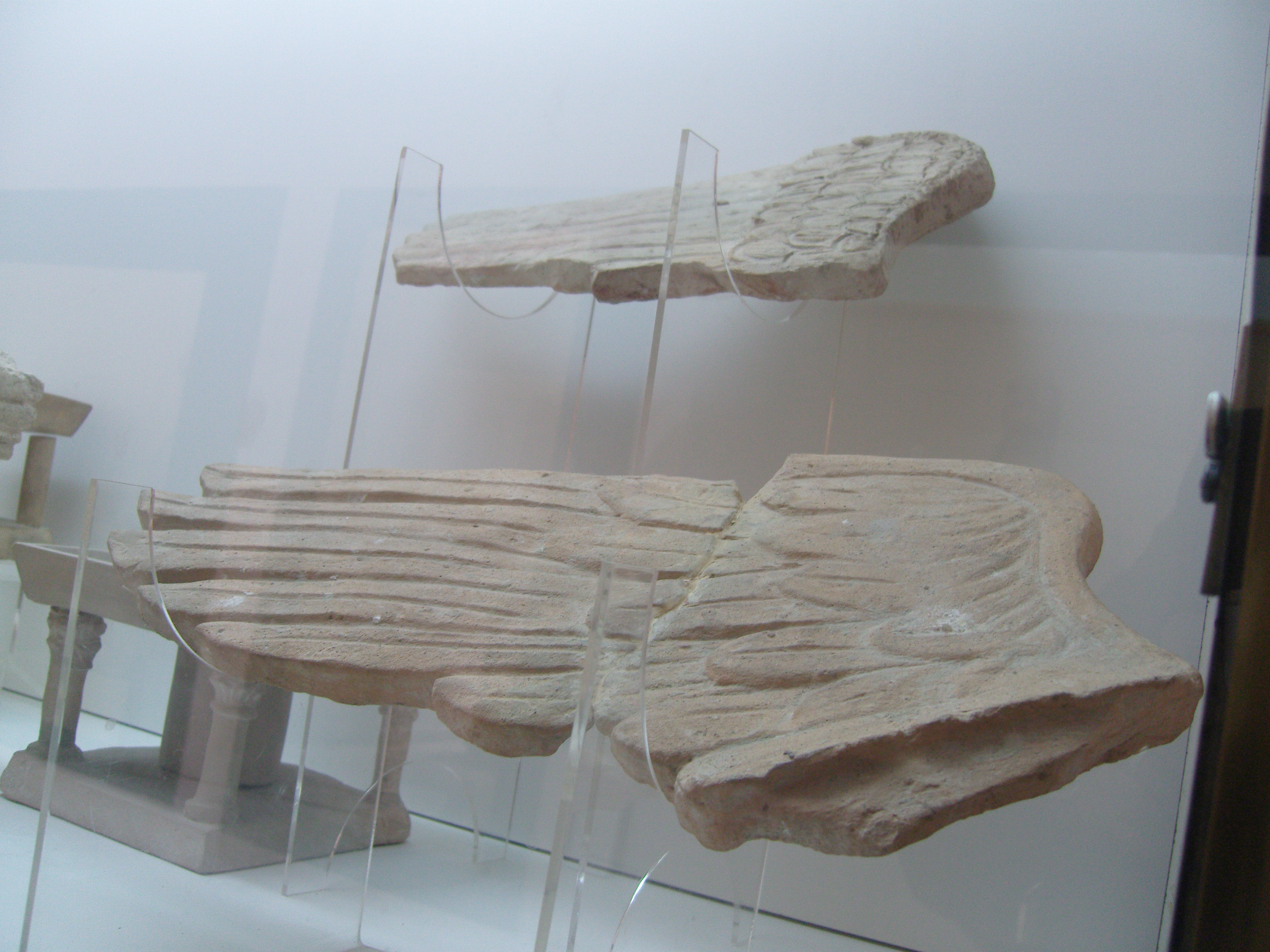
Wings of sphinxes from the Thinissut sanctuary, c. 1st century AD (Nabeul Museum, Tunisia)

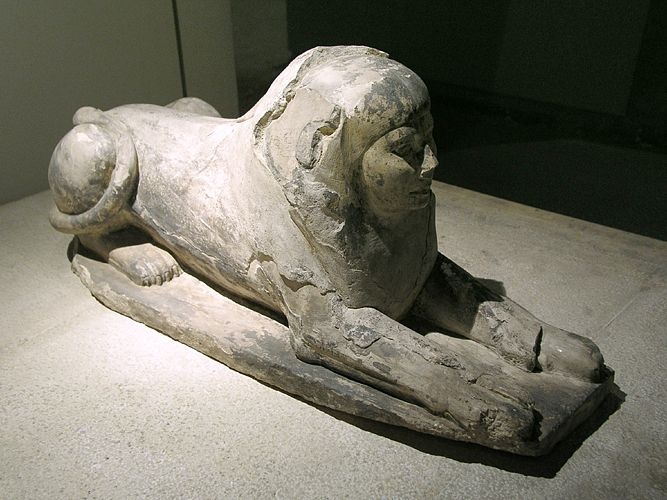
An early Egyptian sphinx, Queen Hetepheres II from the Fourth Dynasty (Cairo Museum)

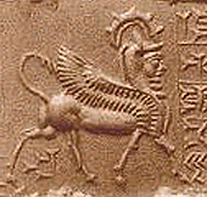
Picture of an Iranian Elamite Gopat on a seal, currently in the National Museum of Iran

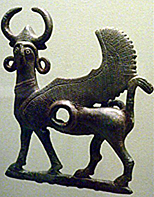
An Iranian Luristan Bronze in the form of a Gopat, currently in the Cleveland Museum of Art

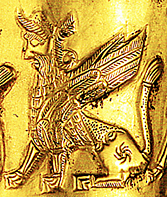
Picture of a Gopat on a golden rhyton from Amarlou, Iran, currently in the National Museum of Iran

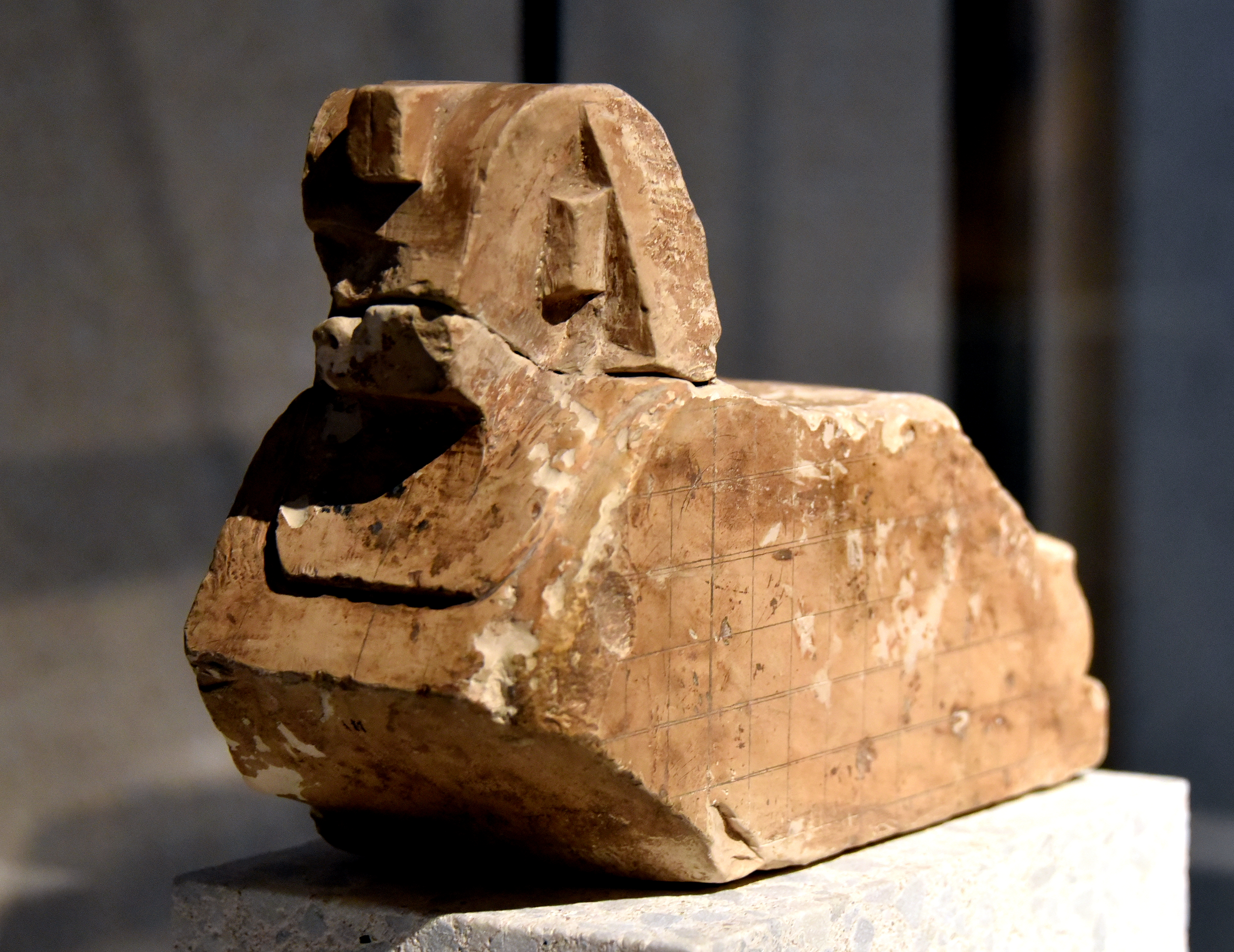
Sculpture model of an Egyptian sphinx. Late Period, 664-332 BC. From Egypt. Neues Museum, Berlin.

== See also ==
- Hybrid creatures in mythology
- List of hybrid creatures in mythology

Similar hybrid creatures

- Lupul Dacic or the head of a wolf with the body of a snake, the sacred symbol of the Dacians, the ancient inhabitants of modern Romania.
- Anzû (older reading: Zû), Mesopotamian monster
- Chimera, Greek mythological hybrid monster
- Centaur and Ichthyocentaur, Greek horse and human hybrid, or horse, human, fish hybrid
- Cockatrice, snake with rooster's head and feet and bat's wings
- Dragon, European and East Asian reptile-like mythical creature
- Griffin or griffon, lion-bird hybrid
- Harpy, Greco-Roman mythological bird monster with woman's face
- Siren, Greco-Roman mythical creature with the combined features of a woman and bird, often a woman's head and breasts and a bird's body
- Lamassu, Assyrian deity, bull/lion-eagle-human hybrid
- Hippogryph, half eagle, half horse
- Manticore, Persian monster with a lion's body and a humanoid head.
- Nue, Japanese legendary creature
- Pegasus, winged stallion in Greek mythology
- Phoenix, self-regenerating bird in Greek mythology
- Pixiu or Pi Yao, Chinese mythical creature
- Qilin, Chinese/East Asian mythical hybrid creature
- Satyr, or Faun, a Greek or Roman mythical creature that is half human half goat
- Sharabha, Hindu mythology: lion-bird hybrid
- Simurgh, Iranian mythical flying creature
- Sirin, Russian mythological creature, half-woman half-bird
- Snow Lion, Tibetan mythological celestial animal
- Yali, Hindu mythological lion-elephant-horse hybrid
- Ziz, giant griffin-like bird in Jewish mythology
- Komainu to compare its use in Japanese culture
- Chinthe similar lion statues in Burma, Laos and Cambodia
- Shisa similar lion statues in the Ryukyu Islands
- Nian to compare with a similar but horned (unicorn) mythical beast
- Haetae to compare with similar lion-like statues in Korea.
