= Epistles of Manushchihr =

The Epistles of Manushchihr alternative spelling for the author as Manuschihar, Manušcihr, Manush-/chihar or Manuščihr (Minocher) (Persian: نامه‌های منوچهر) are a response to comments made by the author's brother on the subject of purification in Zoroastrianism. The letters were written in the year 881 CE.

When Zadsparam (also Zadspram or Zatsparam), who was the high priest of Sirjan, proposed to simplify the Barašnum ritual, the public were not ready for change and were very unsatisfied. Therefore, they decided to complain to the high priest's older brother Manuschchihr, who was the high priest of Fars (also called Pars) and Kerman.

In response, Manushchihr issued three epistles in the issue:

1. A reply to the complaining people
2. an expostulation with his brother
3. a public decree condemning the new precepts of his younger brother as unlawful innovations.

The first epistle is dated March 15, 881 CE; the third is dated June–July 881 CE. This book contains almost 9000 words. Manushchihar is the author of another major Pahlavi book named the 'Dadestan-i Denig'.

E. W. West called the writings of Manuščihr and Zadspram "undoubtedly the most difficult Pahlavi texts in existence, both to understand and to translate."

== See also ==
- Wizidagiha-i Zadspram – 9th-century Zoroastrian text
