= Dadestan-i Denig =

9th-century Middle Persian work

Dādestān ī Dēnīg (Middle Persian pronunciation: [daːdestaːn iː deːniːɡ] "Religious Judgments") or Pursišn-Nāmag ([puɾsiʃnaːmaɡ] "Book of Questions") is a 9th-century Middle Persian work written by Manuščihr, who was high priest of the Persian Zoroastrian community of Pārs and Kermān, son of Juvānjam and brother of Zādspram. The work consists of an introduction and ninety-two questions along with Manuščihr's answers. His questions varies from religious to social, ethical, legal, philosophical, cosmological, etc. The style of his work is abstruse, dense, and is heavily influenced by New Persian.

== See also ==
- Epistles of Manushchihr
