= List of Preserve America Communities =

Preserve America Communities are entitled to display road signs that include the program logo.

This is a list of United States municipalities, counties, neighborhoods, and tribal communities that have been designated as "Preserve America Communities" under the federal government's Preserve America program. As of 2017, more than 900 communities, representing all 50 states and two U.S. territories, had been so designated.

- Abbeville, South Carolina
- Aberdeen, South Dakota
- Abilene, Texas
- Adams County, Iowa
- Aiken, South Carolina
- Alameda, California
- Albany, New York
- Albany, Texas
- Albion, New York
- Alexandria, Virginia
- Alpena, Michigan
- Alpharetta, Georgia
- Alpine, Texas
- Ambridge, Pennsylvania
- American Samoa
- Americus, Georgia
- Anaconda-Deer Lodge, Montana
- Anacortes, Washington
- Anchorage, Alaska
- Anchorage, Kentucky
- Anderson, South Carolina
- Annapolis, Maryland
- Arcadia, Louisiana
- Ardmore, Oklahoma
- Arrow Rock, Missouri
- Asheboro, North Carolina
- Asheville, North Carolina
- Ashland, Kentucky
- Astoria, Oregon
- Atlanta, Texas
- Auburn, New York
- Augusta, Georgia
- Augusta, Kentucky
- Austin, Texas
- Baca County, Colorado
- Bainbridge Island, Washington
- Baldwyn, Mississippi
- Baltimore, Maryland
- Banner Elk, North Carolina
- Barbourville, Kentucky
- Bardstown, Kentucky
- Barre, Vermont
- Barrington, Rhode Island
- Bartlett, Tennessee
- Bastrop, Louisiana
- Bastrop, Texas
- Batesville, Arkansas
- Bath, Maine
- Baton Rouge, Louisiana
- Bay City, Michigan
- Bayfield, Wisconsin
- Beacon, New York
- Beaufort, North Carolina
- Beaufort, South Carolina
- Bedford, Indiana
- Bedford County, Pennsylvania
- Beekman, New York
- Bell Court neighborhood, Lexington, Kentucky
- Bellevue, Kentucky
- Bellingham, Washington
- Belton, Texas
- Benham, Kentucky
- Bennington, Vermont
- Bent County, Colorado
- Benton, Arkansas
- Bethlehem, Pennsylvania
- Beverly, West Virginia
- Biddeford, Maine
- Big Horn County, Montana
- Billings, Montana
- Biloxi, Mississippi
- Binghamton, New York
- Birmingham, Alabama
- Blackstone, Massachusetts
- Blairsville, Pennsylvania
- Bloomington, Indiana
- Blount County, Tennessee
- Blue Island, Illinois
- Bluffton, South Carolina
- Blytheville, Arkansas
- Blythewood, South Carolina
- Boise, Idaho
- Bonita Springs, Florida
- Boone, North Carolina
- Boone County, Kentucky
- Booneville, Arkansas
- Boonville, Missouri
- Bowling Green, Kentucky
- Bowling Green, Ohio
- Boyne City, Michigan
- Bozeman, Montana
- Bradford, Pennsylvania
- Bradford, Vermont
- Bramwell, West Virginia
- Brandon, Vermont
- Brattleboro, Vermont
- Breckenridge, Colorado
- Bridgeport, Connecticut
- Bridgeton, New Jersey
- Brigham City, Utah
- Bristol, Rhode Island
- Brockport, New York
- Brookhaven, New York
- Brookings, South Dakota
- Brownville, Nebraska
- Brownsville, Texas
- Bryan, Texas
- Buffalo, New York
- Burlington, North Carolina
- Burlington, Vermont
- Burrillville, Rhode Island
- Butte-Silver Bow, Montana
- Cadillac, Michigan
- Cadiz, Kentucky
- Caldwell, Idaho
- Calico Rock, Arkansas
- Calvert, Texas
- Calvert County, Maryland
- Camden, Arkansas
- Camden, Maine
- Camden, South Carolina
- Campbellsville, Kentucky
- Canandaigua, New York
- Canal Winchester, Ohio
- Canton, Mississippi
- Canton, Texas
- Canyon, Texas
- Cape Girardeau, Missouri
- Carlisle, Pennsylvania
- Carrollton, Kentucky
- Cartersville, Georgia
- Carthage, Missouri
- Carver, Minnesota
- Casper, Wyoming
- Castroville, Texas
- Cedarburg, Wisconsin
- Celina, Texas
- Centerville, Utah
- Central Falls, Rhode Island
- Chambersburg, Pennsylvania
- Charles County, Maryland
- Charles Town, West Virginia
- Charleston, South Carolina
- Charlotte Amalie, U.S. Virgin Islands
- Cheltenham Township, Pennsylvania
- Cheraw, South Carolina
- Chesterfield, South Carolina
- Chesterfield County, Virginia
- Cheyenne, Wyoming
- Chickasaw, Alabama
- Chinatown Historic District, Honolulu, Hawaii
- Chinatown, Los Angeles, California
- Christiansted, U.S. Virgin Islands
- Cincinnati, Ohio
- Clarksville, Texas
- Clayton, New York
- Cleveland, Mississippi
- Cleveland County, North Carolina
- Clinton, Missouri
- Cloverport, Kentucky
- Cobb County, Georgia
- Colchester, Connecticut
- College Park, Maryland
- Collierville, Tennessee
- Colorado City, Texas
- Colorado Springs, Colorado
- Columbia, South Carolina
- Columbia, Tennessee
- Columbia Borough, Pennsylvania
- Columbus, Mississippi
- Colusa, California
- Connellsville, Pennsylvania
- Conway, Arkansas
- Conway, South Carolina
- Coon Rapids, Iowa
- Coral Gables, Florida
- Corinth, Mississippi
- Cortland, New York
- Corvallis, Oregon
- Covington, Kentucky
- Cranston, Rhode Island
- Crawford County, Georgia
- Cripple Creek, Colorado
- Crosbyton, Texas
- Crowley, Louisiana
- Crowley County, Colorado
- Crown Point, Indiana
- Crow Tribe of Indians
- Cuero, Texas
- Cumberland, Kentucky
- Cumberland, Maryland
- Cumberland, Rhode Island
- Cynthiana, Kentucky
- Dahlonega, Georgia
- Dallas, Texas
- Dalton, Georgia
- Danville, Kentucky
- Darien, Georgia
- Davenport, Iowa
- Dawson Springs, Kentucky
- Dayton, Kentucky
- Dayton, Ohio
- Dayton, Washington
- Daytona Beach, Florida
- DeLand, Florida
- Delaware, Ohio
- Delray Beach, Florida
- Denton, Texas
- Denver, Colorado
- De Pere, Wisconsin
- DeRidder, Louisiana
- Dillon, South Carolina
- The District neighborhood, Nashville, Tennessee
- Dorchester County, Maryland
- Douglas, Massachusetts
- Douglas, Michigan
- Douglas, Wyoming
- Douglasville, Georgia
- Dover, Delaware
- Dover-Foxcroft, Maine
- Dubach, Louisiana
- Dubuque, Iowa
- Dumas, Arkansas
- Durant, Oklahoma
- Dunedin, Florida
- Durango, Colorado
- Durham Township, Pennsylvania
- Dutchess County, New York
- East Greenwich, Rhode Island
- Easton, Maryland
- Easton, Pennsylvania
- East Pikeland Township, Pennsylvania
- East Providence, Rhode Island
- Eau Claire, Wisconsin
- Edenton, North Carolina
- Edmonds, Washington
- El Dorado, Arkansas
- Electra, Texas
- Elk Grove, California
- Elkins, West Virginia
- Elizabethtown, Kentucky
- Elkhart, Indiana
- El Paso, Texas
- Enid, Oklahoma
- Enterprise, Oregon
- Erlanger, Kentucky
- Eureka Springs, Arkansas
- Evanston, Wyoming
- Excelsior Springs, Missouri
- Fairmont, West Virginia
- Falmouth, Massachusetts
- Fargo, North Dakota
- Farmersville, Texas
- Farmington, Maine
- Farmington, Utah
- Fauquier County, Virginia
- Fayetteville, Arkansas
- Fayetteville, Georgia
- Fayetteville, North Carolina
- Fernandina Beach, Florida
- Ferndale, Michigan
- Ferriday, Louisiana
- Ferry County, Washington
- Flagler County, Florida
- Flat Rock, Michigan
- Flemingsburg, Kentucky
- Florissant, Missouri
- Fond du Lac, Wisconsin
- Forsyth, Georgia
- Fort Benton, Montana
- Fort Collins, Colorado
- Fort Madison, Iowa
- Fort Myers, Florida
- Fort Pierre, South Dakota
- Fort Smith, Arkansas
- Fort Thomas, Kentucky
- Fort Valley, Georgia
- Fort Wayne, Indiana
- Fountain Inn, South Carolina
- Frankfort, Kentucky
- Franklin, Kentucky
- Franklin, Tennessee
- Frederick, Maryland
- Fredericksburg, Texas
- Frederiksted, U.S. Virgin Islands
- Fredericktown, Missouri
- Fremont County, Colorado
- Fremont County, Wyoming
- Fresno, California
- Frisco, Colorado
- Frisco, Texas
- Fullerton, California
- Gainesville, Florida
- Galveston, Texas
- Gardiner, Maine
- Gaston County, North Carolina
- Georgetown, Colorado
- Georgetown, Kentucky
- Georgetown, Ohio
- Georgetown, Texas
- George West, Texas
- German Village, Columbus, Ohio
- Gettysburg, Pennsylvania
- Giddings, Texas
- Gilpin County, Colorado
- Glasgow, Kentucky
- Glendale, Arizona
- Glenwood Springs, Colorado
- Glocester, Rhode Island
- Gloucester, Massachusetts
- Golden, Colorado
- Gonzales, Texas
- Grafton, Massachusetts
- Granbury, Texas
- Grand Rapids, Michigan
- Granville, Ohio
- Grapevine, Texas
- Gratz Park neighborhood, Lexington, Kentucky
- Gray Court, South Carolina
- Great Falls, Montana
- Great Neck Plaza, New York
- Greeley, Colorado
- Green Bay, Wisconsin
- Greendale, Wisconsin
- Green River, Wyoming
- Greensburg, Indiana
- Greensburg, Kentucky
- Greenville, Mississippi
- Greenville, North Carolina
- Greenville County, South Carolina
- Greenwood, Mississippi
- Hailey, Idaho
- Halfmoon, New York
- Hamburg, Arkansas
- Hanover, Pennsylvania
- Hanover County, Virginia
- Hardin County, Iowa
- Harlan, Kentucky
- Harlem, Georgia
- Harpers Ferry, West Virginia
- Harris County, Texas
- Harrisburg, Pennsylvania
- Harrisonburg, Virginia
- Harrodsburg, Kentucky
- Hart County, Kentucky
- Hartwell, Georgia
- Hatteras Village, North Carolina
- Hattiesburg, Mississippi
- Havre, Montana
- Hawkinsville, Georgia
- Hearne, Texas
- Hebron, Connecticut
- Helena, Arkansas
- Helena, Montana
- Hendersonville, North Carolina
- Hernando, Mississippi
- Herndon, Virginia
- Henderson, Kentucky
- Hidalgo, Texas
- Highland Falls, New York
- Hightstown, New Jersey
- Hill County, Montana
- Hillsborough, North Carolina
- Hillsville, Virginia
- Hinton, West Virginia
- Historic Filipinotown neighborhood, Los Angeles, California
- Historic Portland neighborhood, Louisville, Kentucky
- Hodgenville, Kentucky
- Holyoke, Massachusetts
- Hooksett, New Hampshire
- Hopedale, Massachusetts
- Hopkinsville, Kentucky
- Horry County, South Carolina
- Horse Cave, Kentucky
- Hot Springs, Arkansas
- Howard County, Maryland
- Hudson, Ohio
- Hunter, New York
- Huntsville, Alabama
- Huron Township, Michigan
- Independence, Missouri
- Independence, Oregon
- Ironbound community, Newark, New Jersey
- Irvington neighborhood, Indianapolis, Indiana, including Irvington Historic District and North Irvington Gardens Historic District
- Ithaca, New York
- Jackson, Wyoming
- Jacksonville, Florida
- Jacksonville, Oregon
- Japantown, San Francisco, California
- Jefferson, Georgia
- Jefferson City, Missouri
- Jefferson County, Montana
- Jeffersonville, Indiana
- Jonesborough, Tennessee
- Jones County, Georgia
- Juneau, Alaska
- Junius Heights neighborhood, Dallas, Texas
- Kalispell, Montana
- Kamiah, Idaho
- Kanab, Utah
- Kauaʻi County, Hawaii
- Keene, New Hampshire
- Kendall County, Texas
- Kennesaw, Georgia
- Kerrville, Texas
- Ketchikan, Alaska
- Key West, Florida
- Kinderhook, New York
- King County, Washington
- Kinston, North Carolina
- Kiowa County, Colorado
- Kissimmee, Florida
- Koreatown neighborhood, Los Angeles, California
- Lac du Flambeau Band of Lake Superior Chippewa Indians (Wisconsin)
- Lafayette, Indiana
- Lafayette, Louisiana
- LaGrange, Georgia
- LaGrange, Kentucky
- Lake City, Colorado
- Lancaster, Pennsylvania
- Lancaster County, Pennsylvania
- Lancaster County, South Carolina
- Lansdowne, Pennsylvania
- La Porte, Indiana
- Laramie, Wyoming
- Laredo, Texas
- Las Vegas, Nevada
- Las Vegas, New Mexico
- Lawrence, Kansas
- Lawrenceburg, Kentucky
- Lead, South Dakota
- Leadville, Colorado
- Leavenworth, Kansas
- Lebanon, Kentucky
- Ledyard, Connecticut
- Leesburg, Virginia
- Leicester, Massachusetts
- Leland, Mississippi
- Lemont, Illinois
- Leon County, Florida
- Letcher County, Kentucky
- Lewes, Delaware
- Lewis and Clark County, Montana
- Lewiston, Maine
- Lewistown, Montana
- Liberty, Kentucky
- Liberty, Missouri
- Liberty, New York
- Lincoln, Nebraska
- Lincoln, Rhode Island
- Lincoln County, North Carolina
- Lincolnton, North Carolina
- Lipscomb County, Texas
- Litchfield, Minnesota
- Little Compton, Rhode Island
- Little Falls, Minnesota
- Little Italy, San Diego, California
- Little Rock, Arkansas
- Little Tokyo, Los Angeles, California
- Livermore, California
- Livingston, Montana
- Llano, Texas
- Lockport, Illinois
- Lodi, Wisconsin
- Logansport, Indiana
- London, Kentucky
- Lowell, Massachusetts
- Lower Merion Township, Pennsylvania
- Ludington, Michigan
- Luling, Texas
- Lynch, Kentucky
- Lynchburg, Virginia
- Mackay, Idaho
- Macon, Georgia
- Madison, Georgia
- Madison, Indiana
- Madisonville, Kentucky
- Mammoth Spring, Arkansas
- Mandeville, Louisiana
- Mannington, West Virginia
- Manteo, North Carolina
- Manti, Utah
- Marion, Iowa
- Marshall, Texas
- Martinsburg, West Virginia
- Marysville, Ohio
- Mason City, Iowa
- Matagorda County, Texas
- Matthews, North Carolina
- Maui County, Hawaii
- Maysville, Kentucky
- Mazomanie, Wisconsin
- McAllen, Texas
- McCormick, South Carolina
- McKinney, Texas
- Media, Pennsylvania
- Medina, Ohio
- Medora, North Dakota
- Mendocino, California
- Mendon, Massachusetts
- Menominee, Michigan
- Meridian, Mississippi
- Mesquite, Texas
- Miami, Florida
- Miami Springs, Florida
- Middlesborough, Kentucky
- Middleburg, Virginia
- Middlebury, Vermont
- Midway, Kentucky
- Milam County, Texas
- Miles City, Montana
- Millbury, Massachusetts
- Millville, Massachusetts
- Milton, Delaware
- Milton, Wisconsin
- Mineola, Texas
- Mineral Point, Wisconsin
- Minneapolis, Minnesota
- Missoula, Montana
- Missoula County, Montana
- Mobile, Alabama
- Moline, Illinois
- Monroe County, Indiana
- Monterey, California
- Monterey County, California
- Montezuma, Georgia
- Montezuma County, Colorado
- Montgomery County, Pennsylvania
- Monticello, Georgia
- Montpelier, Vermont
- Montrose, Colorado
- Morehead, Kentucky
- Morristown, Vermont
- Mount Pleasant, South Carolina
- Mount Pleasant, Utah
- Mount Sterling, Kentucky
- Mount Vernon, Kentucky
- Mount Vernon, Texas
- Muncie, Indiana
- Munfordville, Kentucky
- Murray, Kentucky
- Murray, Utah
- Muskogee, Oklahoma
- Nacogdoches, Texas
- Napa, California
- Nappanee, Indiana
- Natchez, Mississippi
- Natchitoches, Louisiana
- Nelsonville, Ohio
- New Albany, Indiana
- New Berlin, Wisconsin
- New Bern, North Carolina
- New Braunfels, Texas
- New Britain, Connecticut
- Newburgh, New York
- New Castle, Kentucky
- New Harmony, Indiana
- Newkirk, Oklahoma
- New London, Connecticut
- New Orleans, Louisiana
- Newport, Kentucky
- Newport, Rhode Island
- New Richmond, Ohio
- New Shoreham, Rhode Island
- Newton, New Jersey
- Newtown Borough, Pennsylvania
- Newtown Township, Pennsylvania
- New Ulm, Minnesota
- Nicholasville, Kentucky
- Noblesville, Indiana
- Nogales, Arizona
- Northbridge, Massachusetts
- North Castle, New York
- Northfield, Minnesota
- North Little Rock, Arkansas
- North Smithfield, Rhode Island
- Norwalk, Connecticut
- Oak Park, Illinois
- Oak Ridge, Tennessee
- Oakland, Maryland
- Oberlin, Ohio
- Ocean Springs, Mississippi
- Ocracoke, North Carolina
- Odessa, Texas
- Ogdensburg, New York
- Oklahoma City, Oklahoma
- Old Lyme, Connecticut
- Old West End Historic District, Toledo, Ohio
- Olmsted Falls, Ohio
- Ontario, California
- Opelousas, Louisiana
- Orange, Texas
- Orange Mound neighborhood, Memphis, Tennessee
- Oregon City, Oregon
- Osceola, Arkansas
- Osceola, Wisconsin
- Oskaloosa, Iowa
- Ossining, New York
- Otero County, Colorado
- Oxford, Mississippi
- Owego, New York
- Oyster Bay, New York
- Pacolet, South Carolina
- Paducah, Kentucky
- Pagosa Springs, Colorado
- Palestine, Illinois
- Palestine, Texas
- Palm Springs, California
- Palouse, Washington
- Paris, Kentucky
- Paris, Texas
- Park County, Colorado
- Pasadena, California
- Pascagoula, Mississippi
- Pawtucket, Rhode Island
- Payson, Utah
- Peekskill, New York
- Peoria, Arizona
- Perrysburg, Ohio
- Perryville, Kentucky
- Petersburg, Virginia
- Pharr, Texas
- Philadelphia, Pennsylvania
- Philipsburg Borough, Pennsylvania
- Phoenix, Arizona
- Pierce, Idaho
- Pierre, South Dakota
- Pikeville, Kentucky
- Pilot Point, Texas
- Pine Bluff, Arkansas
- Pineville, Kentucky
- Piqua, Ohio
- Pittman Center, Tennessee
- Pittsburg, Texas
- Pittsburgh, Pennsylvania
- Pittsford, New York
- Placerville, California
- Plainfield, Illinois
- Plano, Texas
- Plattsmouth, Nebraska
- Pleasant Grove, Utah
- Plymouth, Massachusetts
- Pocahontas, Arkansas
- Pompano Beach, Florida
- Ponca City, Oklahoma
- Port Gibson, Mississippi
- Portland, Maine
- Portsmouth, New Hampshire
- Port Townsend, Washington
- Pottstown, Pennsylvania
- Poultney, Vermont
- Prescott, Arizona
- Princeton, Kentucky
- Prince William County, Virginia
- Providence, Rhode Island
- Provo, Utah
- Prowers County, Colorado
- Pueblo, Colorado
- Purcellville, Virginia
- Putnam County, New York
- Pyramid Lake Paiute Tribe, Nevada
- Rabbit Hash, Kentucky
- Ramapo, New York
- Randolph County, Arkansas
- Raymond, Mississippi
- Redlands, California
- Redmond, Washington
- Red Lodge, Montana
- Redstone, Colorado
- Red Wing, Minnesota
- Redwood City, California
- Rensselaer County, New York
- Richfield, Wisconsin
- Richford, Vermont
- Richmond, California
- Richmond, Indiana
- Richmond, Kentucky
- Richmond Hill, Georgia
- Riley County, Kansas
- Rio Grande City, Texas
- Ripon, Wisconsin
- Ritzville, Washington
- Riverside, Illinois
- Roanoke, Virginia
- Roaring Springs, Texas
- Rocheport, Missouri
- Rochester, New York
- Rock Hill, South Carolina
- Rockingham, Vermont
- Rock Island, Illinois
- Rockland, Maine
- Rockland County, New York
- Rock Springs, Wyoming
- Rockville, Maryland
- Rockwall, Texas
- Roebling, New Jersey
- Rome, Georgia
- Roslyn, Washington
- Roswell, Georgia
- Roxbury, New York
- Rugby, Tennessee
- Russellville, Kentucky
- Rutland, Vermont
- Sabine County, Texas
- Sacramento, California
- Saco, Maine
- Saginaw, Michigan
- St. Augustine, Florida
- St. Albans, Vermont
- St. Charles, Missouri
- St. Cloud, Minnesota
- St. George Island, Alaska
- St. Johnsbury, Vermont
- St. Joseph County, Indiana
- St. Marys, Georgia
- St. Mary's County, Maryland
- St. Petersburg, Florida
- Ste. Genevieve, Missouri
- Salem, Massachusetts
- Salem, Oregon
- Salisbury, Maryland
- Salt Lake City, Utah
- Saltsburg, Pennsylvania
- San Angelo, Texas
- San Antonio, Texas
- San Clemente, California
- San Francisco, California
- San Juan Bautista, California
- San Marcos, Texas
- San Ramon, California
- Sandersville, Georgia
- Sanford, Florida
- Sanford, Maine
- Santa Ana, California
- Santa Barbara, California
- Santa Monica, California
- Santa Paula, California
- Santa Rosa, California
- Sarasota, Florida
- Saratoga Springs, New York
- Saugatuck, Michigan
- Sault Ste. Marie, Michigan
- Savannah, Georgia
- Schenectady County, New York
- Scott County, Virginia
- Scottdale, Pennsylvania
- Scottsdale, Arizona
- Scottsville, Kentucky
- Seguin, Texas
- Selma, Alabama
- Seward, Alaska
- Sharkey County, Mississippi
- Shawnee, Ohio
- Shawnee, Oklahoma
- Shelby, North Carolina
- Shelby Township, Michigan
- Shelbyville, Kentucky
- Shelter Island, New York
- Shiner, Texas
- Silver City, New Mexico
- Silverton, Colorado
- Simsbury, Connecticut
- Sioux City, Iowa
- Sioux Falls, South Dakota
- Sitka, Alaska
- Skowhegan, Maine
- Skykomish, Washington
- Slidell, Louisiana
- Smethport, Pennsylvania
- Smithfield, Rhode Island
- Smithfield, Virginia
- Smithville, Texas
- Snow Hill, Maryland
- Solvang, California
- Somerset, Ohio
- Sonoma, California
- Soulard, St. Louis, Missouri
- Southampton, New York
- South Bend, Indiana
- Southbury, Connecticut
- South Kingstown, Rhode Island
- Sparks, Nevada
- Sparta Township, Michigan
- Spokane, Washington
- Spotsylvania County, Virginia
- Springerville, Arizona
- Springfield, Kentucky
- Springfield, Massachusetts
- Stafford County, Virginia
- Stanford, Kentucky
- Steamboat Springs, Colorado
- Stevens County, Washington
- Stevensville, Montana
- Stillwater, Minnesota
- Stoughton, Wisconsin
- Strasburg, Virginia
- Suffield, Connecticut
- Suffolk, Virginia
- Sutton, Massachusetts
- Syracuse, New York
- Tallahassee, Florida
- Tampa, Florida
- Tarpon Springs, Florida
- Taylor, Texas
- Terry, Montana
- Teton County, Wyoming
- Texarkana, Arkansas
- Thai Town, Los Angeles, California
- Thomasville, Georgia
- Thomasville, North Carolina
- Tifton, Georgia
- Tipp City, Ohio
- Tiverton, Rhode Island
- Tombstone, Arizona
- Tooele County, Utah
- Transylvania County, North Carolina
- Tredyffrin Township, Pennsylvania
- Troy, New York
- Tucson, Arizona
- Tupelo, Mississippi
- Tulsa, Oklahoma
- Tuolumne County, California
- Tyler, Texas
- Tyronza, Arkansas
- Ukiah, California
- Upton, Massachusetts
- Uxbridge, Massachusetts
- Valdosta, Georgia
- Valley, Alabama
- Van Buren, Arkansas
- Vancouver, Washington
- Ventura, California
- Vergennes, Vermont
- Vermillion, South Dakota
- Versailles, Kentucky
- Vicksburg, Mississippi
- Victoria County, Texas
- Victorian Village neighborhood, Memphis, Tennessee
- Vienna, Georgia
- Virginia City, Montana
- Wabash, Indiana
- Wabasha, Minnesota
- Waco, Texas
- Walker County, Georgia
- Walker County, Texas
- Wall Township, New Jersey
- Walterboro, South Carolina
- Warren, Rhode Island
- Warrenton, Virginia
- Warsaw, Kentucky
- Warwick, Rhode Island
- Washington, D.C.
- Washington, Georgia
- Washington, Missouri
- Washington County, Pennsylvania
- Waterford, New York
- Waterford, Virginia
- Waterloo, Iowa
- Waukesha, Wisconsin
- Wausau, Wisconsin
- Waxahachie, Texas
- Waxhaw, North Carolina
- Waynesville, North Carolina
- Weaverville, California
- West Allis, Wisconsin
- West Chester, Pennsylvania
- Westerly, Rhode Island
- West Linn, Oregon
- West Main Street Preservation District, Louisville, Kentucky
- West Memphis, Arkansas
- West Palm Beach, Florida
- West Point, Kentucky
- West Salem Historic District, Winston-Salem, North Carolina
- Weston, Missouri
- Wethersfield, Connecticut
- Wheeling, West Virginia
- White Mountain Apache Tribe, Arizona
- White River Junction, Vermont
- Whitewater, Wisconsin
- Whitfield County, Georgia
- Wichita, Kansas
- Wilkes County, North Carolina
- Will County, Illinois
- Williams, Arizona
- Williamsburg, Virginia
- Wilmington, North Carolina
- Wimberley, Texas
- Winchester, Kentucky
- Winder, Georgia
- Windham, Connecticut
- Windsor, Colorado
- Windsor, Vermont
- Winnsboro, Texas
- Winooski, Vermont
- Woodbridge Township, New Jersey
- Woodstock, Illinois
- Woonsocket, Rhode Island
- Worcester, Massachusetts
- Worcester County, Maryland
- Wyandotte, Michigan
- York, Pennsylvania
- York County, South Carolina
- Yuma, Arizona
