= List of Thai restaurants =

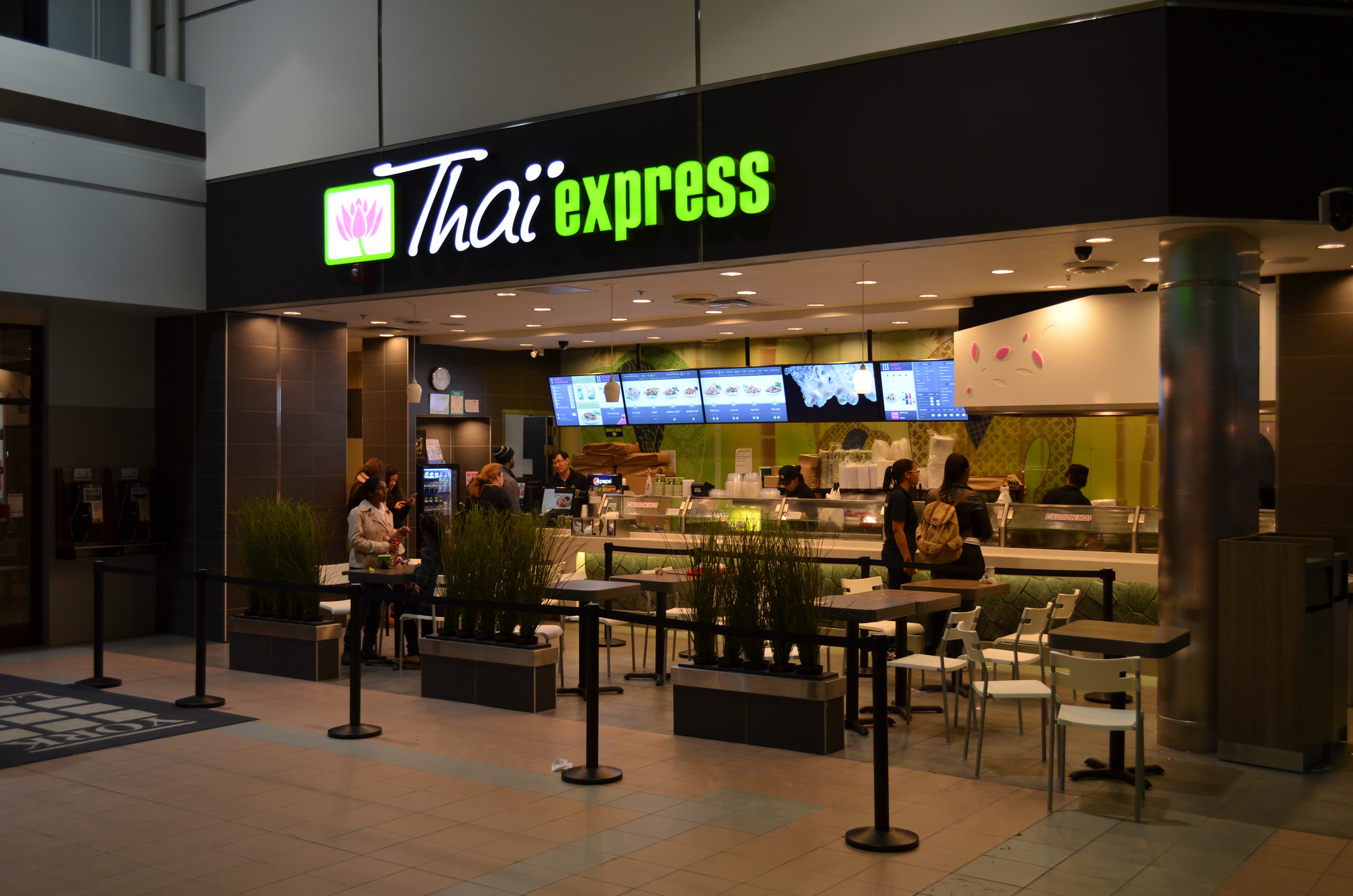
A Thaï Express location at York University, Toronto, Canada

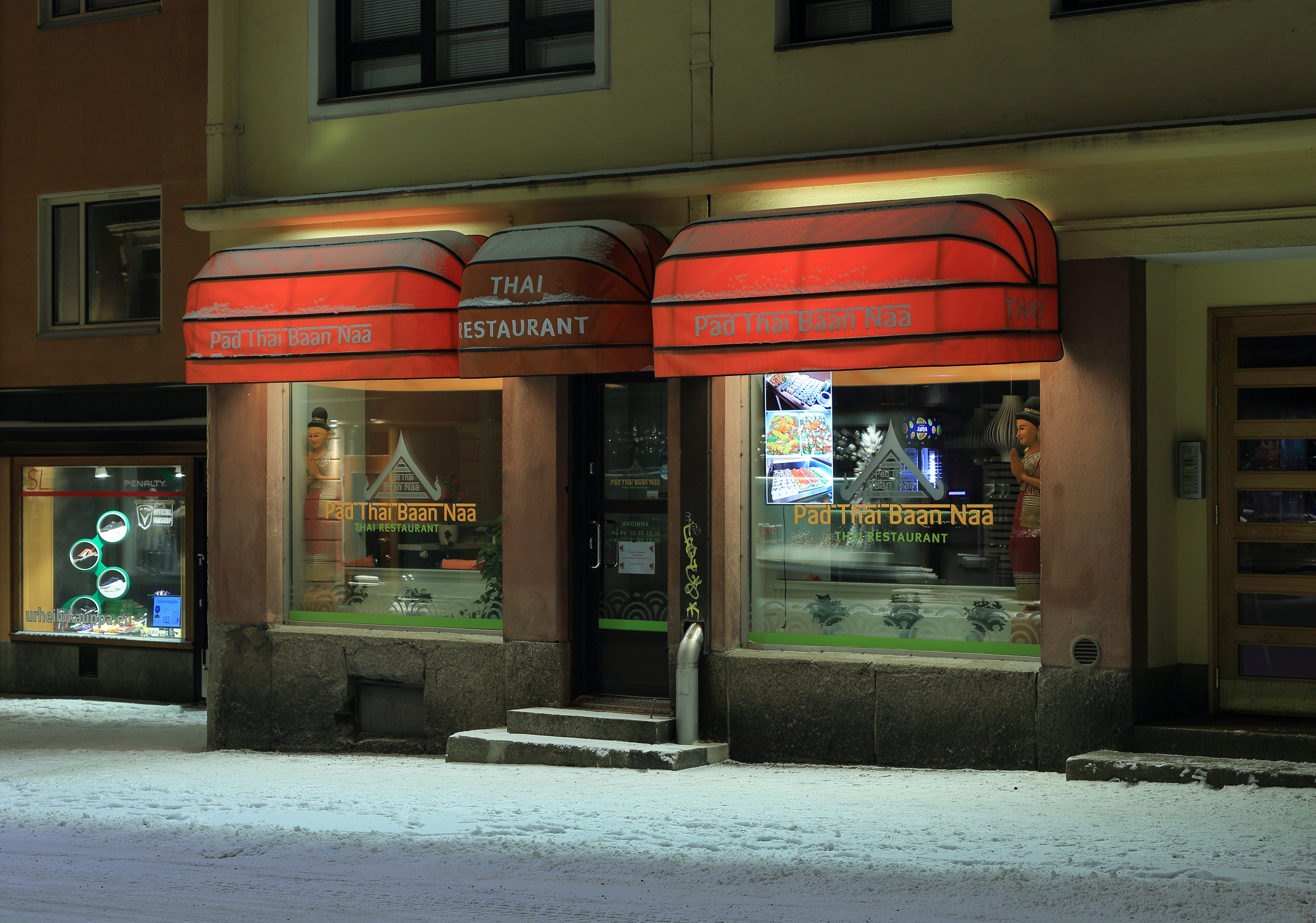
Pad Thai Baan Naa Thai Restaurant in Oulu, Finland

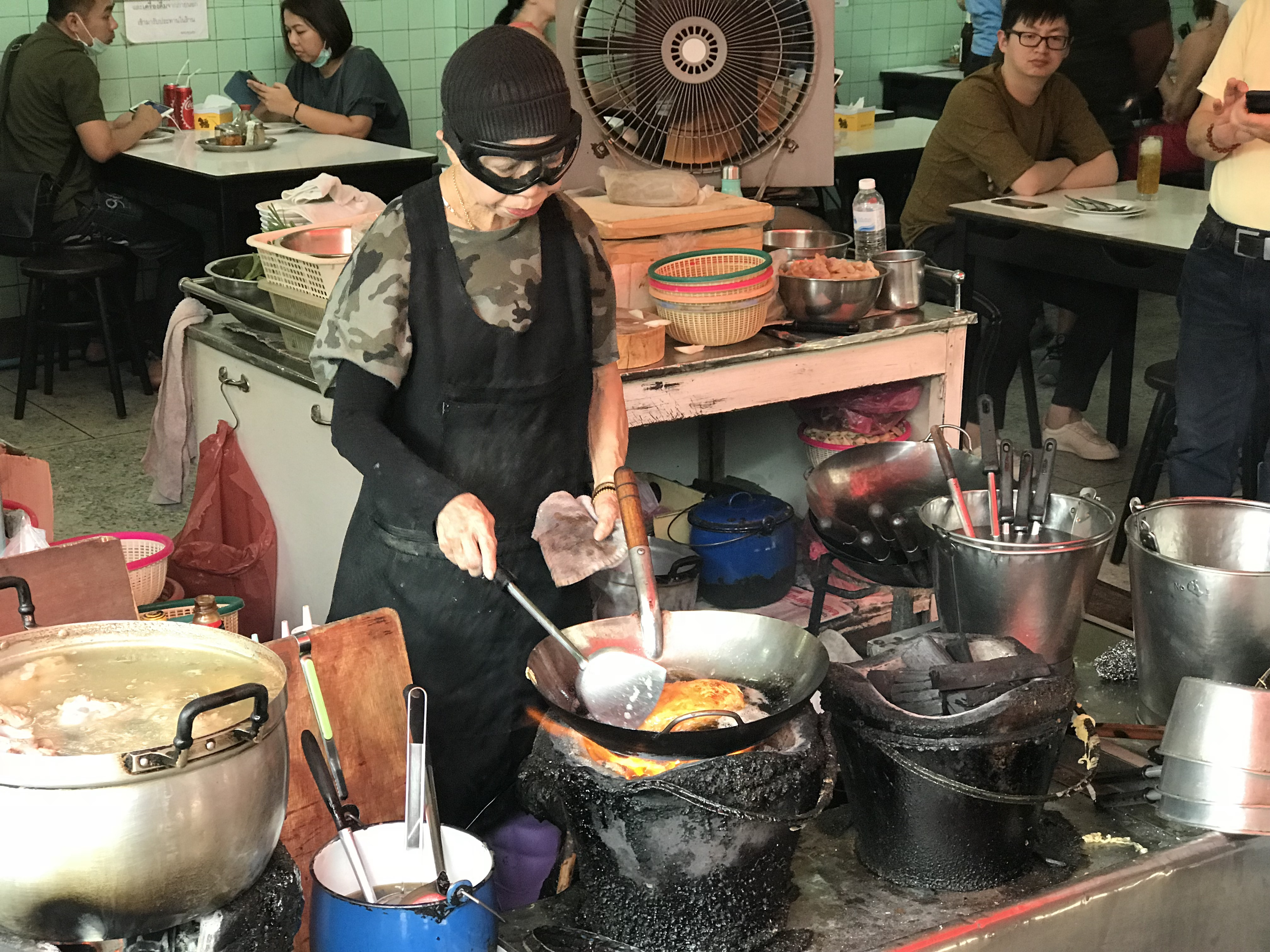
Owner Jay Fai (Supinya Junsuta) cooking at Jay Fai in Bangkok, Thailand

Following is a list of notable restaurants that specialize in Thai cuisine:

- Anajak Thai, Los Angeles, California, U.S.
- AngloThai, London
- Baan Lao Fine Thai Cuisine, Richmond, British Columbia
- Camile – an Irish restaurant chain that serves Thai cuisine
- Eem – Thai barbecue restaurant and cocktail bar in Portland, Oregon
- E-san Thai Cuisine – Portland, Oregon metropolitan area
- Green Elephant Vegetarian Bistro – Portland, Maine in the Art's District
- Hat Yai – Portland, Oregon
- Jay Fai – a street side restaurant in Bangkok, Thailand, it received one star in the inaugural Bangkok 2018 Michelin Guide.
- Kalaya, Philadelphia, Pennsylvania
- Khao Moo Dang, Portland, Oregon
- Kiin Kiin – a Thai cuisine restaurant located in Copenhagen, Denmark. It is one of the few Thai restaurants in the world to receive a Michelin star.
- Kin Khao, San Francisco
- Langbaan, Portland, Oregon
- Lotus of Siam, Las Vegas, Nevada
- Nari, San Francisco
- Nong's Khao Man Gai, Portland, Oregon
- OK Chicken and Khao Soi
- PaaDee, Portland, Oregon
- Palms Thai, Los Angeles, California
- Phuket Cafe, Portland, Oregon
- Pok Pok – Portland, Oregon, New York City
- Prik Hom, San Francisco
- Rhong-Tiam, New York City
- Royal Dragon Restaurant – in Bangkok, Thailand, was recorded in the Guinness World Records as the world's largest restaurant in 1992. The 8.35 acres (33,800 m^{2}) restaurant has seating for 5,000 customers.
- Rukdiew Cafe, Portland, Oregon
- Sen Yai
- Somtum Der, New York City
- Thai Express – a chain of restaurants serving Thai cuisine. The first restaurant was opened in Holland Village in Singapore in May 2002. Since then, there have been other outlets in Malaysia, Indonesia, Vietnam, Australia, Mongolia, and India (Hyderabad).
- Thaï Express – (commonly spelled Thai Express), a franchise chain of quick service restaurants serving Thai cuisine across Canada
- Thai Peacock, Portland, Oregon
- TTFB Company Limited - The largest Thai Food Restaurant Chain in the World with over 150 locations and 4 different Thai Food Concepts, is a publicly listed company based in Taiwan.
- Typhoon, Oregon and Washington, U.S.
- Uncle Boons, New York City
- Yaowarat, Portland, Oregon
- Zabb Elee, New York City

== See also ==
- List of Thai dishes
- List of Thai ingredients
- Lists of restaurants
- Thai Town, Los Angeles
