= Thai Town, Los Angeles =

Neighborhood in California, United States

Thai Town
- Neighborhood of Los Angeles
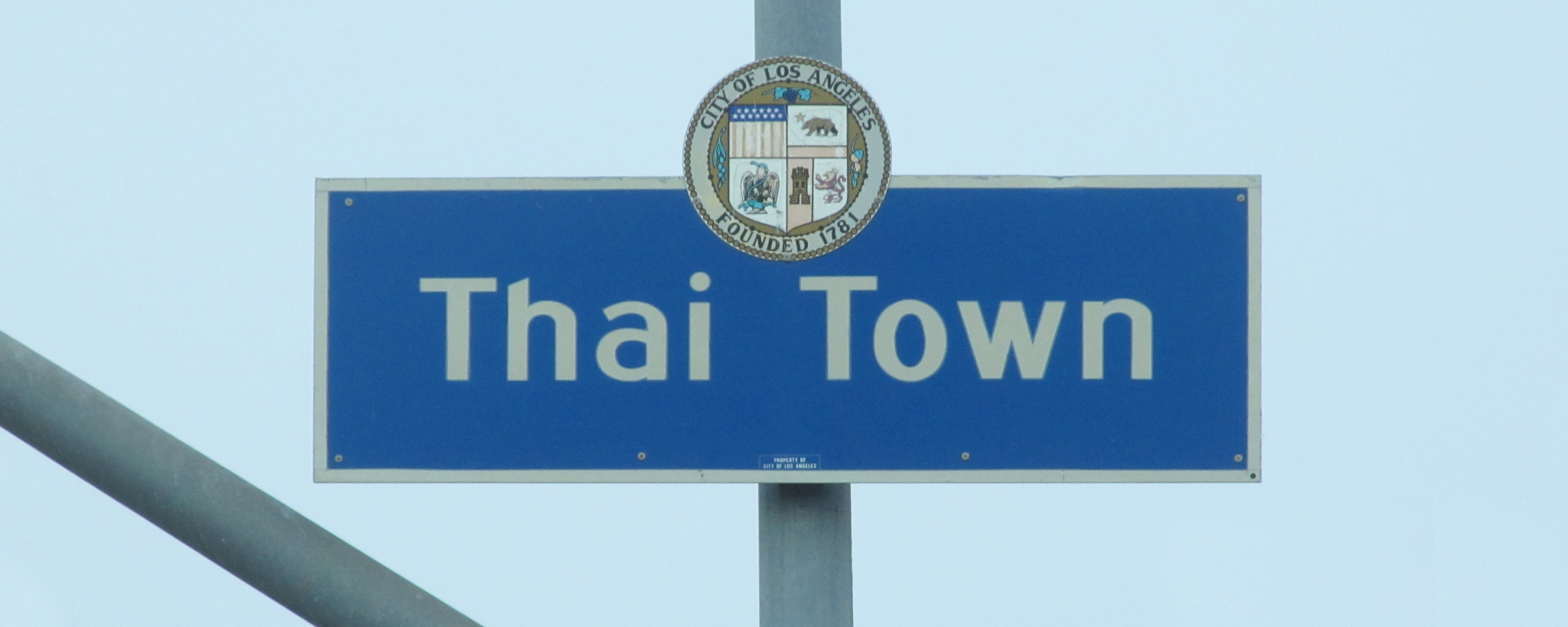
- Thai Town neighborhood sign located at the intersection of Normandie Avenue and Hollywood Boulevard.

- Location within Central Los Angeles
- Coordinates: 34.101735°N 118.30466°W
- Country: United States
- State: California
- County: Los Angeles
- City: Los Angeles
- Time zone: UTC−8 (PST)
  - Summer (DST): UTC−7 (PDT)

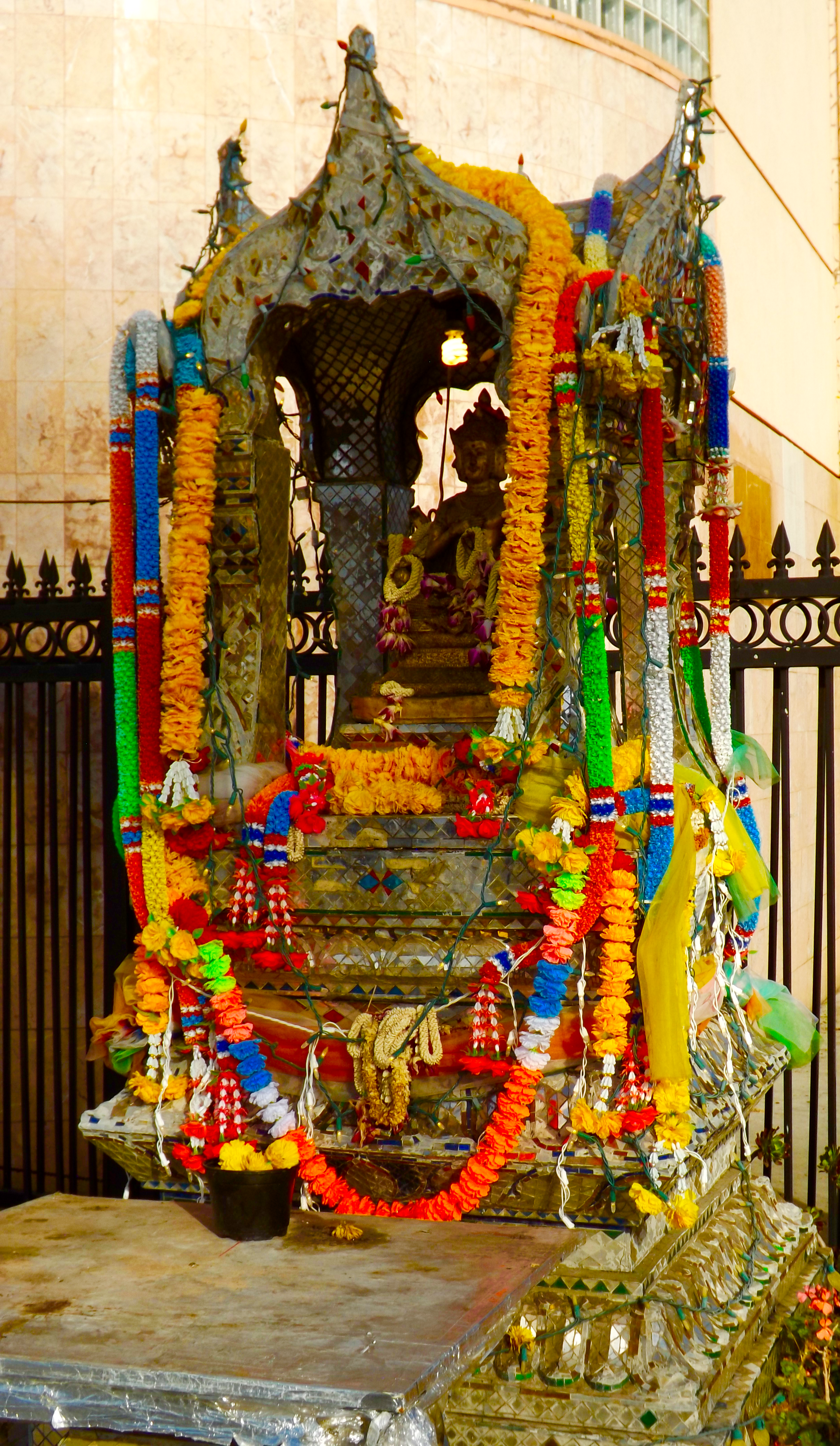
Sidewalk shrine to Phra Phrom on Hollywood Boulevard outside Thailand Plaza, 2015

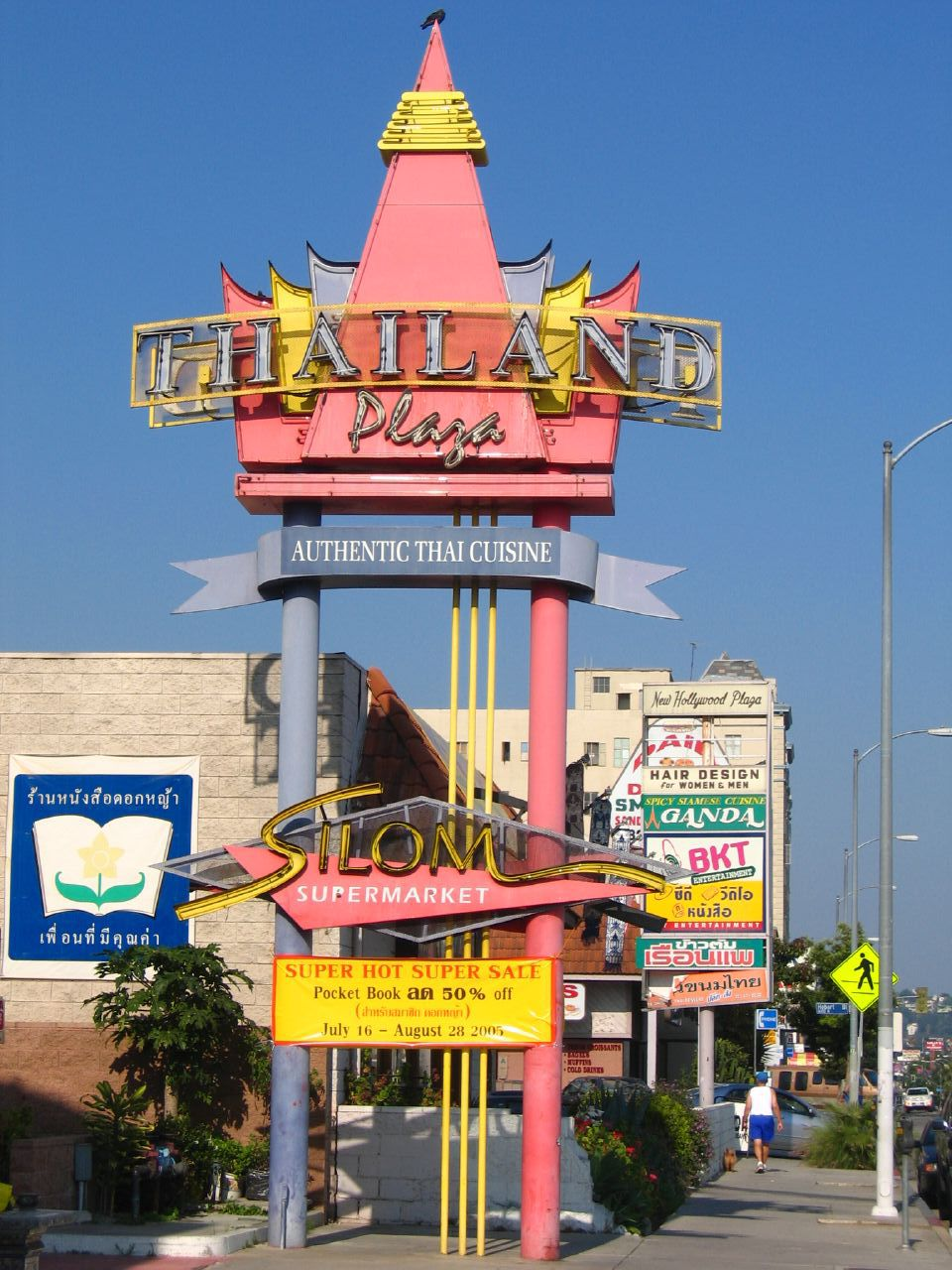
Thai Town Plaza on Hollywood Boulevard

Thai Town (Thai: ไทยทาวน์) is a neighborhood in Central Los Angeles, California. In 2008, it was one of the five Asian Pacific Islander neighborhoods in the city—along with Chinatown, Little Tokyo, Historic Filipinotown, and Koreatown—that received federal recognition as a Preserve America neighborhood. It is one of two officially recognized Thai Towns in the United States apart from Thai Town in New York City which was recognized by the New York City Council in 2022.

== History ==
The Los Angeles City Council voted unanimously on October 27, 1999, to designate the neighborhood as "Thai Town," the first place in the United States with that name. The designation was proposed by Councilwoman Jackie Goldberg, who said the move would bring neighborhood pride, economic development and promotion of tourism to the area. At that time, the Los Angeles Department of Transportation (LADOT) was instructed to install signage to identify Thai Town.

It was significant to Goldberg that the staff of the Thai Community Development Center includes other Asians, Latinos and whites, all intent on improving the East Hollywood business community in general. "They're already calling Thai Town the 77th province," said Thai Chamber of Commerce President Niphun Rojanasopondist, referring to the 76 provinces that made up Thailand at the time.

In 2000, the center won a $15,000 Department of Public Works matching grant to create a garden and to bring from Thailand four golden statues of kinnari (mythical creatures who are half angel, half bird) to mark Thai Town's borders.

In 2008, the Thai Community Development Center expanded its partnership with the four Asian Pacific Islander communities in Los Angeles to pursue a national designation by the White House of all five API towns as a Preserve America Neighborhood. The other communities are Chinatown, Little Tokyo, Historic Filipinotown and Koreatown. They formed the API Preserve America Neighborhood Coalition. First Lady Laura Bush presented the "Preserve America" designation, signifying value as a cultural and historic asset. The designation made Thai Town eligible for up to $250,000 in Preserve America grants, along with $250,000 in other public and private matching funds.

In August 2019, on Queen Sirikit’s birthday, a health fair (health expo) was held in Thai Town by the Thai Los Angeles Temple Royal Thai Consulate-General and Thai Nurses Association of California, where medical personnel offered free health check-ups to the Thai community. The event garnered over 300 participants.

In June 2020, as a result of outrage over the George Floyd police brutality case, businesses including a Thai restaurant were damaged due to rioters and looters.

== Geography ==
Thai Town is a six-block neighborhood flanking Hollywood Boulevard between Normandie Avenue and Western Avenue, its entrances being marked by two statues of apsonsi (a mythical half human, half lion angel in Thai folklore).

Thai Town is bordered by the neighborhoods of Los Feliz to the north and east, central Hollywood to the west, and Little Armenia to the south.

== Cultural significance ==
In 2000 a Los Angeles Times writer said Thai Town was a place where

gourmands can stock up on bitter melon and round Thai eggplant. A Thai dessert shop offers preserved jackfruit, Pandan cookies and Kring Krang, crisply sweetened rice. The large Silom supermarket occupies the middle of a block near Hobart Boulevard, its exterior the rose-hued color of dusk with ornate trimming and a spirit house, draped with colorful garlands and a stone-faced Buddha image, guarding the entrance from destructive forces.

Asian and Asian American Studies Professor, Mark Pandoongpatt observes that Thai restaurants in America do more than just feed customers, or provide a livelihood for owners and workers. They have also been a significant channel in which Thai-Americans justify the occupying of spaces. Additionally, these restaurants help serve as a 'culinary contact zone' which allow non-Thais to engage with Thai culture and the community through food.

== Demographics ==
The neighborhood has been the home to immigrant groups, including Armenians and Latinos, for a long time, and Thai Americans began settling there in the 1960s. It is estimated that there are approximately 300,000 Armenians currently living in or near Thai Town.

The influx of Thai people into East Hollywood made the neighborhood a "point of entry" for the 80,000 Thais estimated to be living in Southern California. Many came with the intention to attend Southern California universities. Another pull factor was a historically booming restaurant industry at the time which attracted business owners in search of economic opportunity.

Data for the area show that 27% of households live below the poverty line—a rate 12 percentage points higher than the county average. Fueling the persistent poverty has been the arrival of thousands of working-class Thai immigrants in the last two decades who have flooded sweatshops, restaurant kitchens and, most recently, massage parlors, said Chancee Martorell, executive director of the Thai Community Development Center, which has conducted several studies on the plight of Thai Town.

== Public transport ==
The area is served by the Metro B Line subway at the Hollywood/Western station in addition to Metro Local bus lines 2, 180, 206, 207, & 217.

== Holidays ==
On the first Sunday in April, Thai Town celebrates Songkran, the Thai New Year, by closing off Hollywood Boulevard within its boundaries, and setting up food stands and entertainment on the street along with a parade on the street from New Hampshire Avenue to Winona Boulevard.

Songkran celebrations in Thai Town also include religious ceremonies, cultural performances, folk dances, along with collaboration with the Thai Christian Church.

In April 2011, proceeds from the celebration of Songkran Festival (Thai New Year) were donated to Japan’s Red Cross Earthquake and Tsunami Relief, to aid those affected by a recent earthquake and tsunami.

== Notable people ==
Kavee Thongprecha, nicknamed "Thai Elvis", is a former Elvis impersonator who performed at the restaurant Palms Thai.

== See also ==
- List of Thai restaurants
