= Nari (restaurant) =

Thai restaurant in San Francisco, California, U.S.

- Interactive map of Nari

Restaurant information
- Food type: Thai
- Rating: (Michelin Guide)
- Location: 1625 Post Street, San Francisco, California, United States
- Coordinates: 37.7856°N 122.4286°W
- Website: narisf.com

Nari is a Thai restaurant in San Francisco, California, United States. It has received a Michelin star.

== See also ==
- List of Michelin-starred restaurants in California
- List of Thai restaurants
