= Khao Moo Dang =

Thai restaurant in Portland, Oregon, U.S.

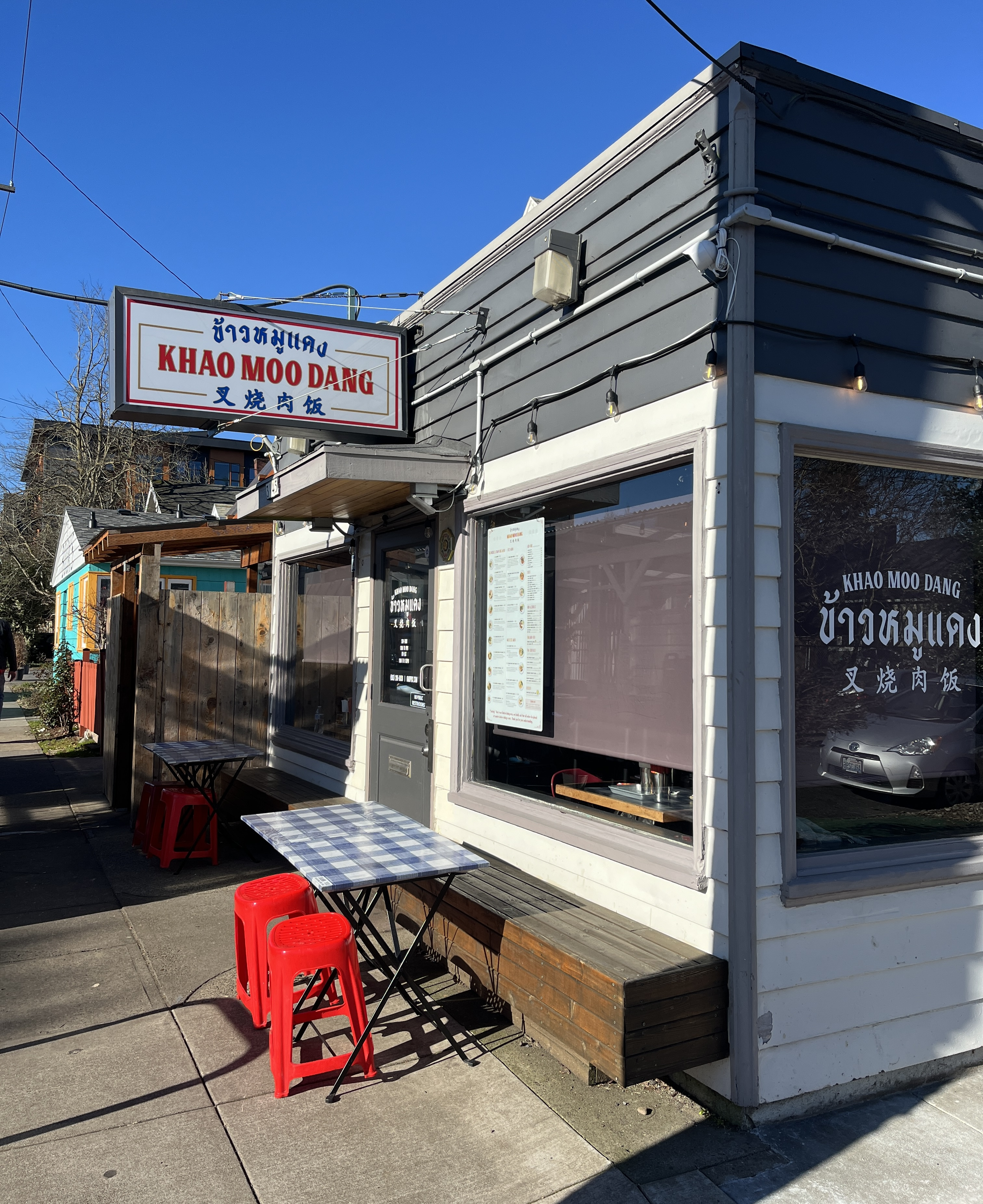
- The restaurant's exterior, 2025
- Interactive map of Khao Moo Dang

Restaurant information
- Established: December 2019
- Owners: Chookiat "Ham" Saenguraiporn; Kanik "Song" Charoendee; Sitthisak "Nuii" Phoonkwan
- Food type: Thai
- Location: 3145 Southeast Hawthorne Boulevard, Portland, Multnomah, Oregon, 97214, United States
- Coordinates: 45.5122°N 122.6329°W
- Website: kmdpdx.com

Khao Moo Dang is a Thai restaurant in Portland, Oregon, United States. Chookiat "Ham" Saenguraiporn, Kanik "Song" Charoendee, and Sitthisak "Nuii" Phoonkwan opened the restaurant in southeast Portland's Sunnyside neighborhood in December 2019. Khao Moo Dang has garnered a positive reception.

== Description ==
The Thai restaurant Khao Moo Dang operates on Hawthorne Boulevard in southeast Portland's Sunnyside neighborhood. Eater Portland has described Khao Moo Dang as a "simply adorned" counter service establishment. The restaurant specializes in khao mu daeng and other pork dishes such as ba-mhee haang and ba-mhee nam. Among bowls and soups is the #8 House Curry Noodle, which has pork belly and loin, a soft-boiled egg, and yu choy greens with khao soi and noodles. The drink menu has included a margarita with lotus syrup, a tamarind whiskey sour, and Thai iced tea.

== History ==
Chookiat "Ham" Saenguraiporn, Kanik "Song" Charoendee, and Sitthisak "Nuii" Phoonkwan opened Khao Moo Dang in December 2019, in the space previously occupied by restaurant Chiang Mai. Khao Moo Dang is operated by the family behind local establishments Thai Peacock and Rukdiew Cafe and has been described as a "sibling" business.

== Reception ==
Ron Scott and Alex Frane included the #8 House Curry Noodle in Eater Portland's 2021 overview of the city's "most potent hangover cures". The website's Brooke Jackson-Glidden recommended the dumpling soup in a 2022 list of sixteen "sick day delivery standbys" in Portland. In 2023, Thom Hilton and Michelle DeVona included the business in an overview of recommended eateries in the Hawthorne District, and Jackson-Glidden and Nick Woo included the Ba Mhee Tom Yum in a list of sixteen "soul-soothing" noodle soups in the city. In 2024, Krista Garcia and Katrina Yentch included Khao Moo Dang in Eater Portland's overview of recommended restaurants for "stunning" Thai cuisine in the metropolitan area. The business also appeared in a list of eighteen "underrated" eateries in the city.

Jashayla Pettigrew included the business in KOIN's 2023 list of Portland's top seven dumpling eateries, according to Yelp reviews. Khao Moo Dang ranked number 85 in Yelp's 2026 list of the nation's top restaurants.

== See also ==
- List of Thai restaurants
