= Somtum Der =

Thai restaurant in New York City, U.S.

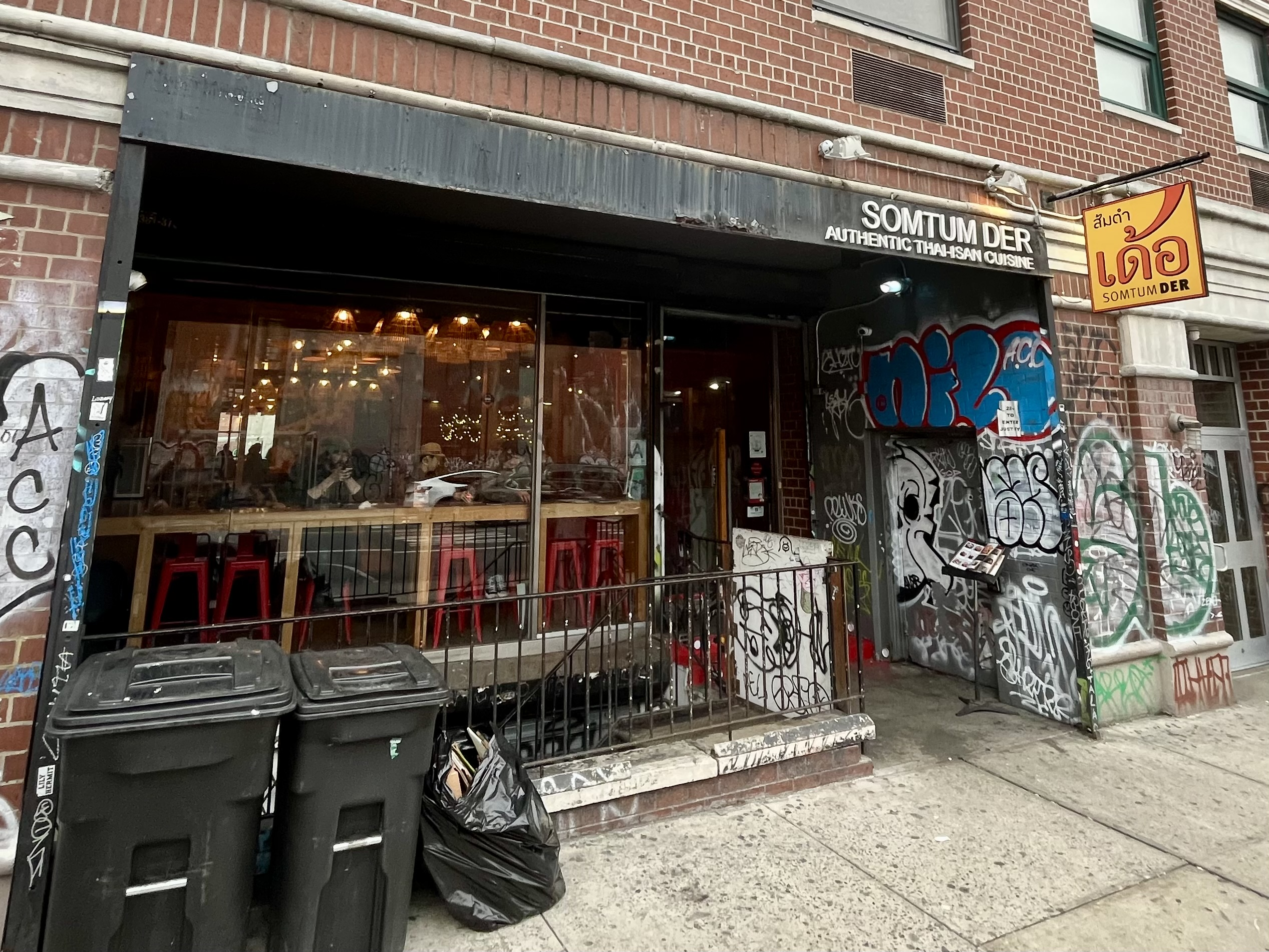
- Somtum Der in January 2024
- Interactive map of Somtum Der

Restaurant information
- Established: 2013
- Closed: May 2026
- Chef: Yim-Kridsanai Nethanunt
- Food type: Thai (Northeastern/Isan)
- Dress code: Casual
- Rating: Michelin Guide (2016)
- Location: 85 Avenue A, New York City, Manhattan, New York, 10009, United States
- Coordinates: 40°43′30.9″N 73°59′3.6″W
- Other locations: Red Hook, Brooklyn (closed,) Bangkok (Thailand,) Shibuya Tokyo (Japan,) Taipei (Taiwan)
- Website: somtumdernewyork.com

Somtum Der was a Thai restaurant in the East Village sub neighborhood of Alphabet City in Manhattan in New York City with a closed location in Red Hook, Brooklyn. The restaurant's original location opened in the Sala Daeng neighborhood of Bangkok, Thailand with a second location in the Tha Tian Market as well as other locations outside of Japan and in NYC in Shibuya in Tokyo, Japan, as well as in Taipei, Taiwan. The restaurant received a Michelin star in 2016 and held it for one year. The name somtum refers to green papaya salad and they specialize in Isan cuisine, or Thai food from northeastern Thailand which has a heavy Laotian influence, such as larb.

== See also ==
- List of Michelin-starred restaurants in New York City
- List of Thai restaurants
