= Anajak Thai =

Thai restaurant in Los Angeles, California, U.S.

- Interactive map of Anajak Thai

Restaurant information
- Established: 1981
- Food type: Thai
- Location: 14704 Ventura Blvd., Los Angeles, California, 91403, United States
- Coordinates: 34°9′5.5″N 118°27′12″W
- Website: www.anajakthai.com

Anajak Thai is a Thai restaurant in Sherman Oaks, California. The business earned Justin Pichetrungsi a James Beard Foundation Award in the Best Chef: California category.

== See also ==
- James Beard Foundation Award: 2020s
- List of Thai restaurants
