= Thai Express =

Canadian Thai restaurant chain

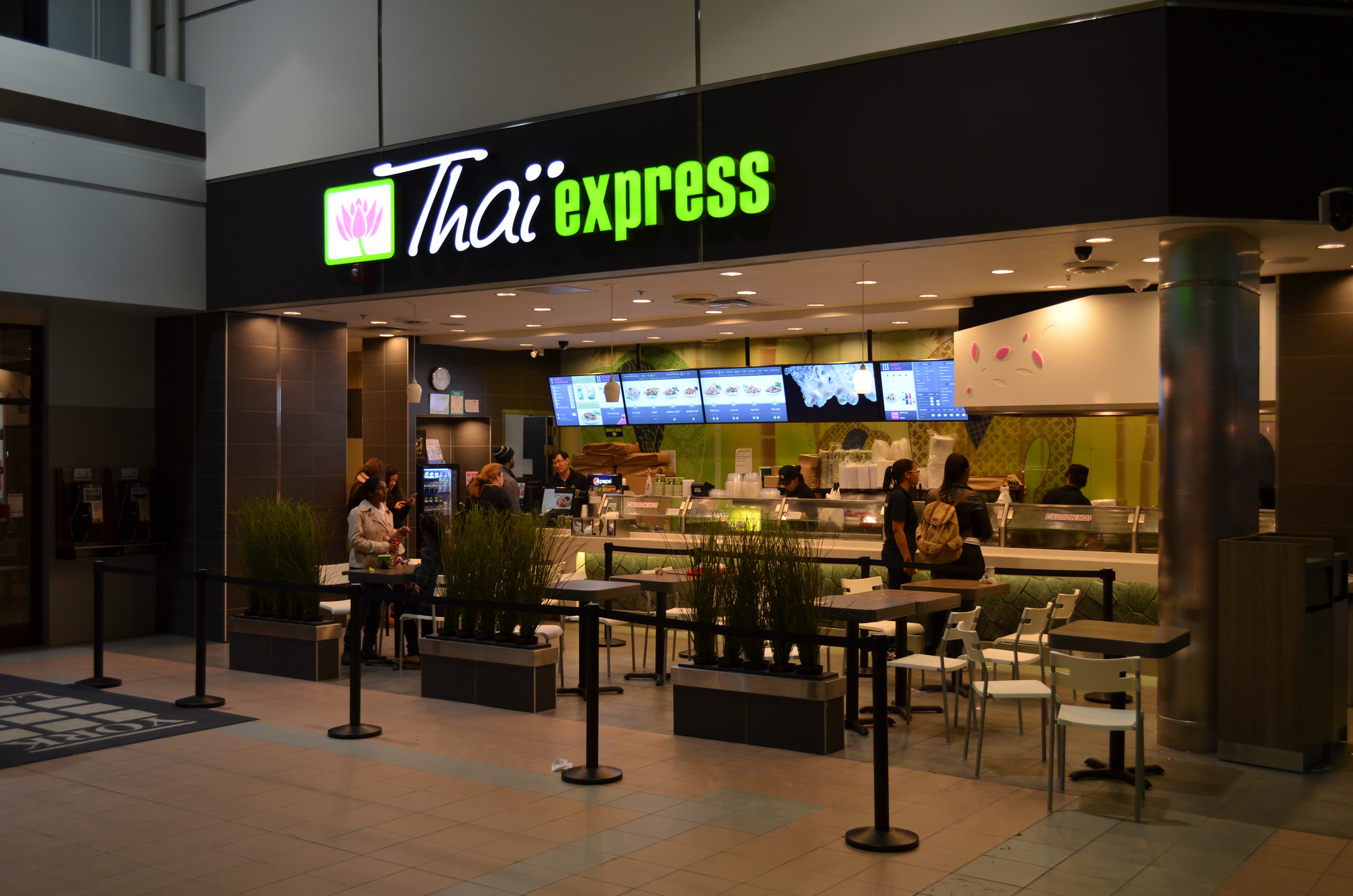
- Thai Express at York University
- Type: Wholly owned subsidiary
- Industry: Restaurant
- Founded: 1999, Montreal, Quebec
- Headquarters: Montreal, Quebec, Canada
- Number of locations: 300
- Area served: Canada, Guyana, United Kingdom, United Arab Emirates, United States
- Products: Food service
- Parent: MTY Food Group
- Website: www.thaiexpress.ca

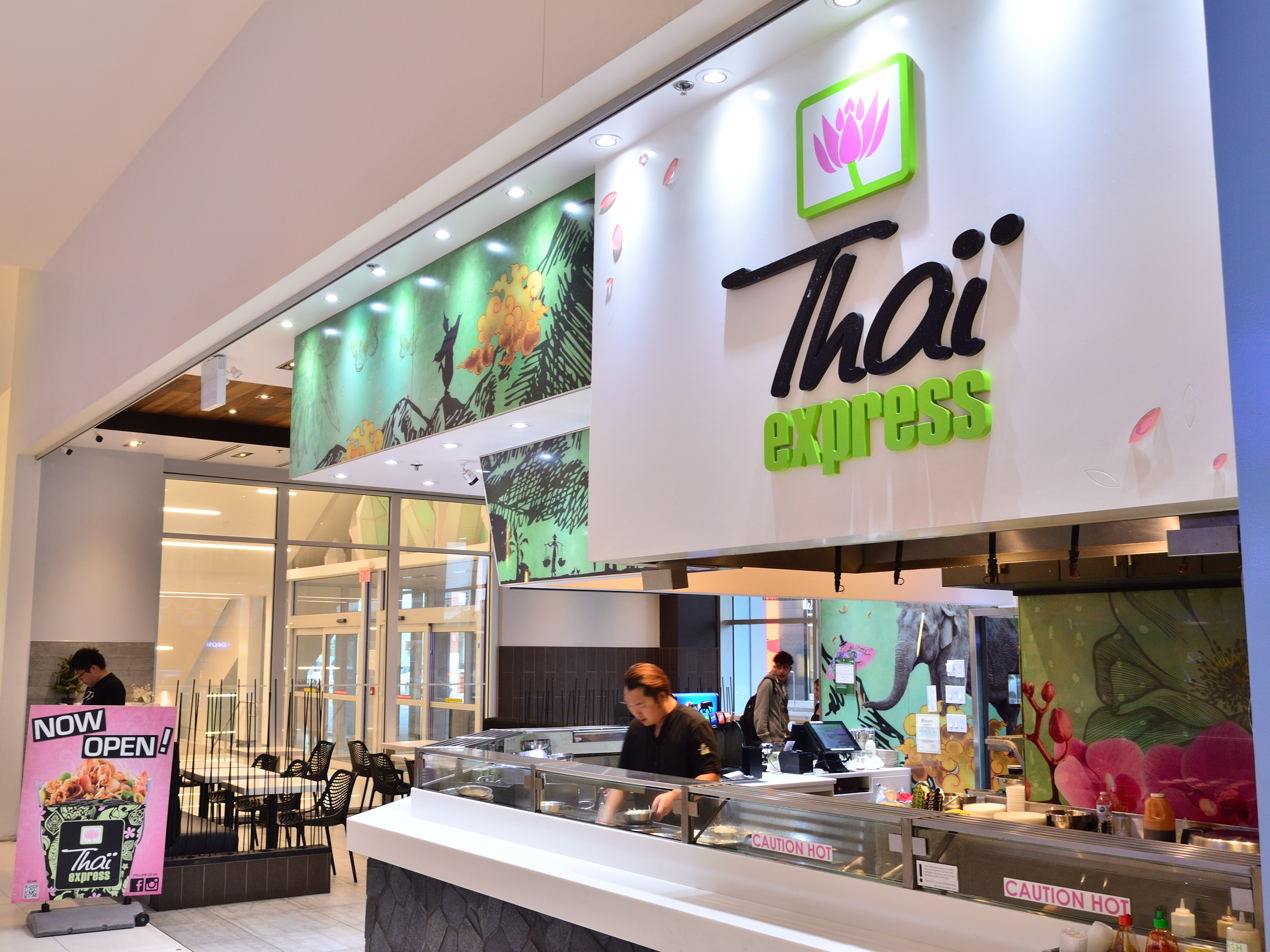
Thai Express in Markham

Thai Express is a franchise chain of quick service restaurants serving Thai cuisine across Canada, the United States, UAE and the United Kingdom. The Thaï Express brand is owned by the MTY Food Group. In 2009, Thaï Express won the Golden Chain award franchisor of the year award from the Conseil québécois de la franchise.

MTY had purchased Thaï Express from Montreal-based Tara Fung Holding for an undisclosed amount at the time of the acquisition, Thaï Express had six outlets, all of those were franchised and five of which were located in food courts.

== Format ==
The restaurants are of the fast food type. Customers give their order at a counter, pay and then wait for their food in at counter to be cooked in front of the customer if they enjoy watching; Then they take it to a table if the outlet is a restaurant with seating, or take it away if the outlet does not provide seating. The style of the restaurants is "modern". Generally the colour schemes are mostly white with pale green and pink, as well as wooden textures.

== Locations ==
There are locations in Quebec, Ontario, Manitoba, Alberta, Prince Edward Island, Saskatchewan, British Columbia, Nova Scotia, Newfoundland and Labrador, and New Brunswick, as well as in Dubai, United Arab Emirates; the United Kingdom; and Guyana. Most of the locations are counters in shopping mall food courts, but some are sit-down restaurants.

Thaï Express opened its first location in the United States at the Mall of America in Bloomington, Minnesota in May 2017.

== See also ==
- List of Canadian restaurant chains
- List of Thai restaurants
