= Thai Peacock =

Thai restaurant in Portland, Oregon, U.S.

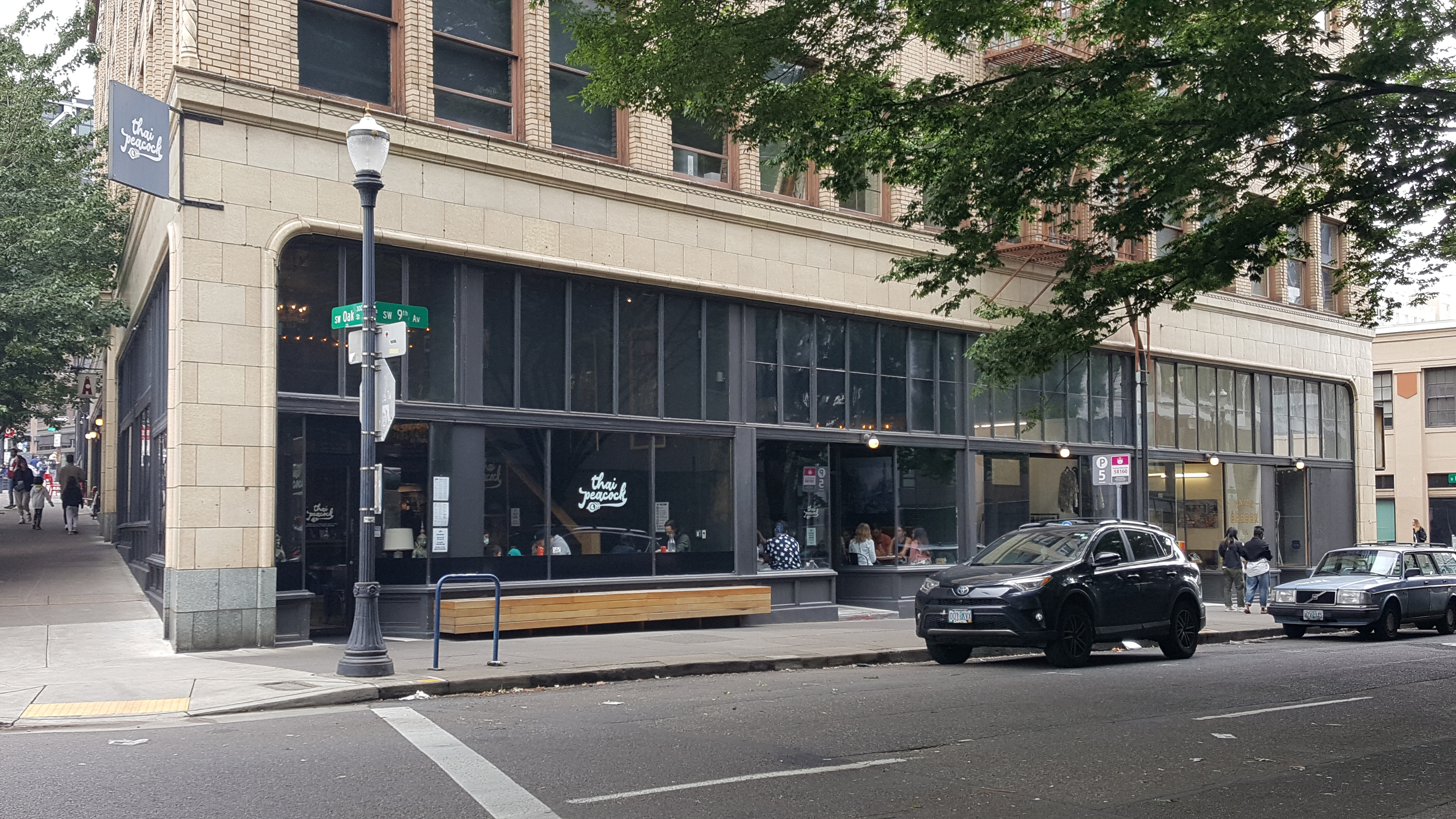
- The restaurant's exterior, 2022
- Interactive map of Thai Peacock

Restaurant information
- Owner: Chookiat "Ham" Saenguraiporn
- Food type: Thai
- Location: 219 Southwest 9th Avenue, Portland, Multnomah, Oregon, 97205, United States
- Coordinates: 45.5227°N 122.6802°W
- Website: thaipeacockpdx.com

Thai Peacock is a Thai restaurant in Portland, Oregon. Chookiat "Ham" Saenguraiporn is the owner.

== Description ==
The Thai restaurant Thai Peacock operates at the intersection of Southwest 9th Avenue and Oak Street in downtown Portland. According to Portland Monthly, the restaurant's colorful umbrellas "mark a corner of the oddly-shaped block" near Powell's Books. The menu includes Evil Jungle Noodles, Pra Ram with peanut sauce, Thai BBQ Chicken, salad rolls, and Thai tea.

== History ==
Thai Peacock is owned by Chookiat "Ham" Saenguraiporn.

=== Affiliated businesses ===
The restaurant Khao Moo Dang, which began operating in southeast Portland in late 2019 and is co-owned by Saenguraiporn, Kanik "Song" Charoendee, and Sitthisak "Nuii" Phoonkwan, is considered a sibling establishment to Thai Peacock. The team is also associated with Rukdiew Cafe, which opened in 2022.

Little Peacock (also known as Little Thai Peacock) operates in Pine Street Market, a food hall in Old Town Chinatown's United Carriage and Baggage Transfer Building. For Dumpling Week in 2024, Little Peacock served Yum Giew Thod, or Thai crispy dumplings with crab stick, ground pork, and pickled garlic fish-lime sauce.

== Reception ==
Portland Monthly has said the Evil Jungle Noodles and Thai BBQ Chicken "are creative twists worth trying". In Best Places: Portland (2010), John Gottberg and Elizabeth Lopeman considered Thai Peacock to be among "uniquely Portland" restaurants. In 2022, Thai Peacock was among the highest-rated Asian restaurants in the city, according to Tripadvisor. The website gave ratings of 4.5 for food, 4 for service, 4.5 for value, and 4 for atmosphere, each on a scale of 5.

Thai Peacock has ranked in the Best Thai Restaurant category of Willamette Week's annual Best of Portland readers' pollI multiple times. The business placed second in 2020, was a runner-up in 2022, and ranked second again in 2023. The business was a runner-up and a finalist in the same category in 2024 and 2025, respectively.

== See also ==
- List of Thai restaurants
