= AngloThai =

- Interactive map of AngloThai

Restaurant information
- Food type: British-Thai; Thai
- Location: London, United Kingdom

AngloThai is a Michelin-starred Thai (or British-Thai) restaurant in Marylebone, London. John Chantarasak is the chef; he and his wife Desiree Chantarasak own the business. The restaurant also uses British ingredients such as cornish monkfish, crown prince pumpkin, and Hebridean hogget.

== See also ==
- List of Michelin-starred restaurants in Greater London
- List of Thai restaurants
