= Prik Hom =

Restaurant in San Francisco, California, U.S.

- Interactive map of Prik Hom

Restaurant information
- Established: February 2023
- Food type: Thai
- Location: 3226 Geary Boulevard, San Francisco, California, 94118, United States
- Coordinates: 37°46′54.7″N 122°27′13.5″W

Prik Hom is a Thai restaurant in San Francisco, California. Established in February 2023, the business was included in The New York Times's 2023 list of the 50 best restaurants in the United States.

== See also ==
- List of Thai restaurants
