= Typhoon (restaurant) =

Defunct chain of Thai restaurants based in Tigard, Oregon, U.S.

Restaurant information
- Established: 1997
- Closed: 2012
- Location: Oregon; Washington, United States

Typhoon! was a Tigard, Oregon-based Thai restaurant with seven locations in the U.S. states of Oregon and Washington, including Beaverton, Bend, Gresham, and Redmond. The restaurant shut down in 2012.

== History ==
Bo and Steve Kline opened the original restaurant in northwest Portland in 1995, and was charged with unfair labor conditions in 2010. In early 2014, after the restaurant had closed, an executive was accused of stealing $1 million.

== Legal issues ==
Typhoon! Has been sued multiple times by their employees, have been delinquent on their taxes and in September 2010, the state filed a civil suit claiming, that the restaurant discriminated against Thai chefs. One of their locations was seized by the landlord in February 2011, on the basis non-payment of rent. The following month, some of their vendors sued because they weren’t being paid.

The discrimination suit also alleged human trafficking violations. A federal arbitration panel found in favor of the chef and awarded them $268,000. Arbitrators awarded damages to former Typhoon! chefs, but found no evidence on the human trafficking claims.

== See also ==
- List of defunct restaurants of the United States
- List of Thai restaurants
