= Nong's Khao Man Gai =

Restaurant in Portland, Oregon, U.S.

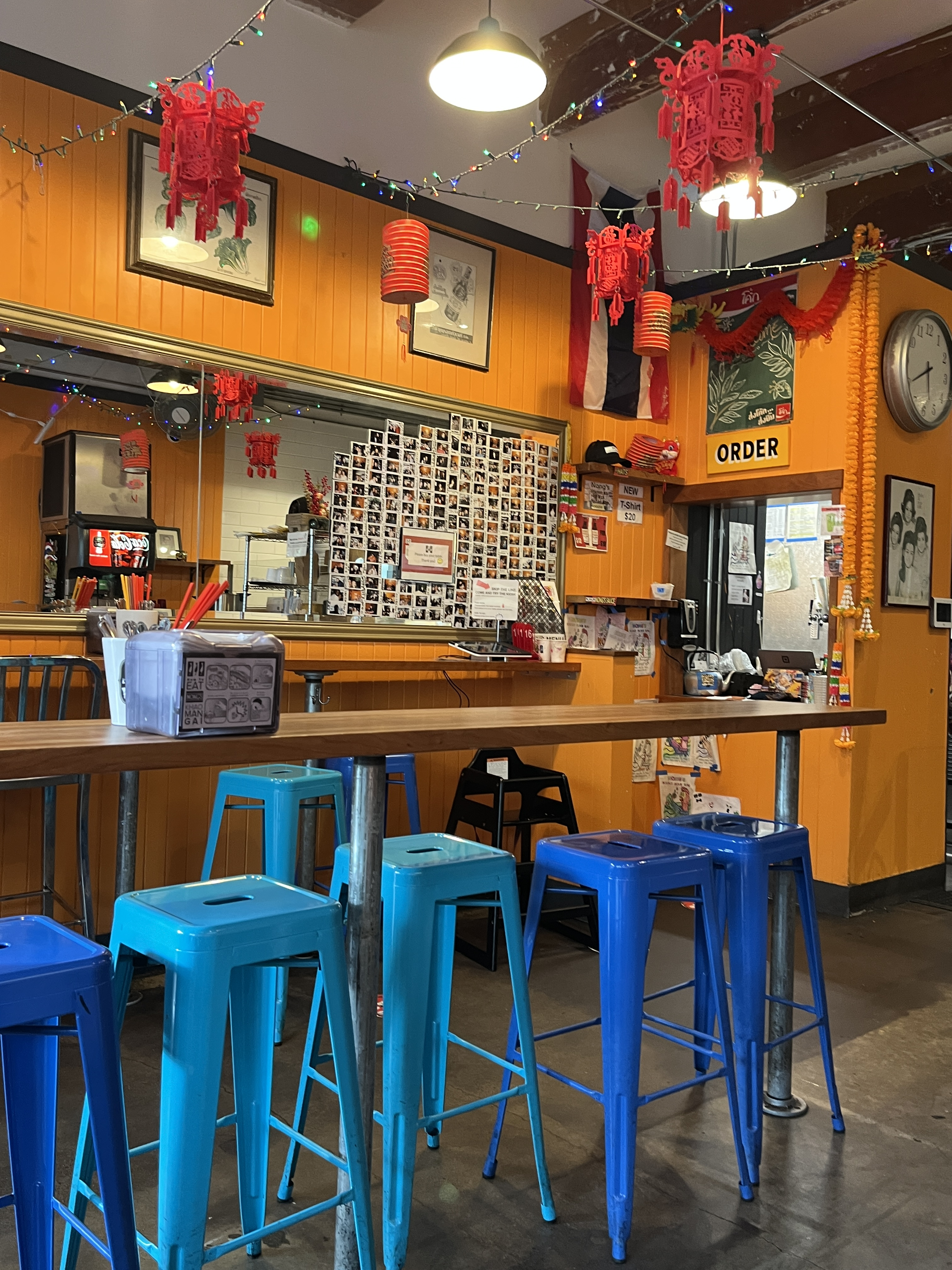
- Interior of the restaurant in southwest Portland, 2025
- Interactive map of Nong's Khao Man Gai

Restaurant information
- Established: 2009
- Owner: Nong Poonsukwattana
- Food type: Thai
- Location: 609 SE Ankeny St C and 417 SW 13th Ave, Portland, Multnomah, Oregon, United States
- Coordinates: 45.52238°N 122.65940°W
- Website: khaomangai.com

Nong's Khao Man Gai is a Thai restaurant located in Portland, Oregon which primarily serves Khao man gai, a chicken and rice dish originating in Southeast Asia.

== History ==
Nong's Khao Man Gai was founded by Nong Poonsukwattana in 2009. Poonsukwattana emigrated to Oregon from Bangkok, Thailand in 2003. She arrived with $70 and a suitcase. Poonsukwattana began working as a waitress at several restaurants in Beaverton, Oregon before eventually receiving a position at Pok Pok, a Thai restaurant in Portland. At Pok Pok, she was the only Thai cook. Poonsukwattana was later able to purchase a food cart off Craigslist for $1,300, and, in 2009, opened Nong's Khao Man Gai as a food cart at Southwest 10th Avenue and Alder Street, serving chicken and rice every day until the product ran out.

The first brick and mortar restaurant is located in southeast Portland's Buckman neighborhood.

In 2014, the restaurant was featured on Chopped. American chef Andrew Zimmern visited for an episode of the Travel Channel series The Zimmern List. Nong's Khao Man Gai was a vendor at the first Taste of Thailand festival in 2024.

== Reception ==
Nong's Khao Man Gai was included in The Infatuation's 2024 list of Portland's best restaurants. Katrina Yentch included the business in Eater Portland's 2025 overview of the best restaurants in Buckman. Michael Russell included the business in The Oregonian's 2025 list of the 21 best restaurants in southeast Portland. He ranked Nong's number 24 in the newspaper's 2025 list of Portland's 40 best restaurants. The business was included in Portland Monthly's 2025 list of 25 restaurants "that made Portland". Writers for Portland Monthly included the khao man gai in a 2025 list of the city's "most iconic" dishes.

== See also ==
- List of Thai restaurants
