= Zabb Elee =

Thai restaurant in New York City, U.S.

- Interactive map of Zabb Elee

Restaurant information
- Food type: Thai
- Location: 75 Second Avenue, New York City, New York, 10003, United States
- Coordinates: 40°43′35.7″N 73°59′22″W

Zabb Elee was a Thai restaurant in New York City. The restaurant had received a Michelin star.

== See also ==
- List of Michelin-starred restaurants in New York City
- List of Thai restaurants
