= Uncle Boons =

Thai restaurant in New York City, U.S.

- Interactive map of Uncle Boons

Restaurant information
- Established: 2013
- Closed: 2020
- Food type: Thai
- Location: 7 Spring Street, New York City, New York, 10012, United States
- Coordinates: 40°43′16.7″N 73°59′39.8″W
- Website: uncleboons.com

Uncle Boons was a Thai restaurant in New York City. The restaurant closed as a result of the COVID-19 pandemic.

== See also ==
- List of Michelin-starred restaurants in New York City
- List of Thai restaurants
