= Palms Thai =

Thai restaurant in Los Angeles, California, U.S.

- Interactive map of Palms Thai

Restaurant information
- Established: 1997
- Food type: Thai
- Location: 5900 Hollywood Blvd, Los Angeles, California, 90028, United States
- Coordinates: 34°6′5″N 118°19′6″W
- Website: palmsthairestaurant.com

Palms Thai is a Thai restaurant in the Hollywood neighborhood of Los Angeles, California. It is primarily known for its Thai Elvis impersonator, which has made it a hub for fans of Elvis Presley.

Palms Thai originally opened in Thai Town, Los Angeles, and is still often described as being part of the neighborhood. Kavee "Kevin" Thongpricha performed for many years as the restaurant's resident Elvis impersonator, although he has since retired.

== See also ==
- List of Thai restaurants
