= Apsonsi =

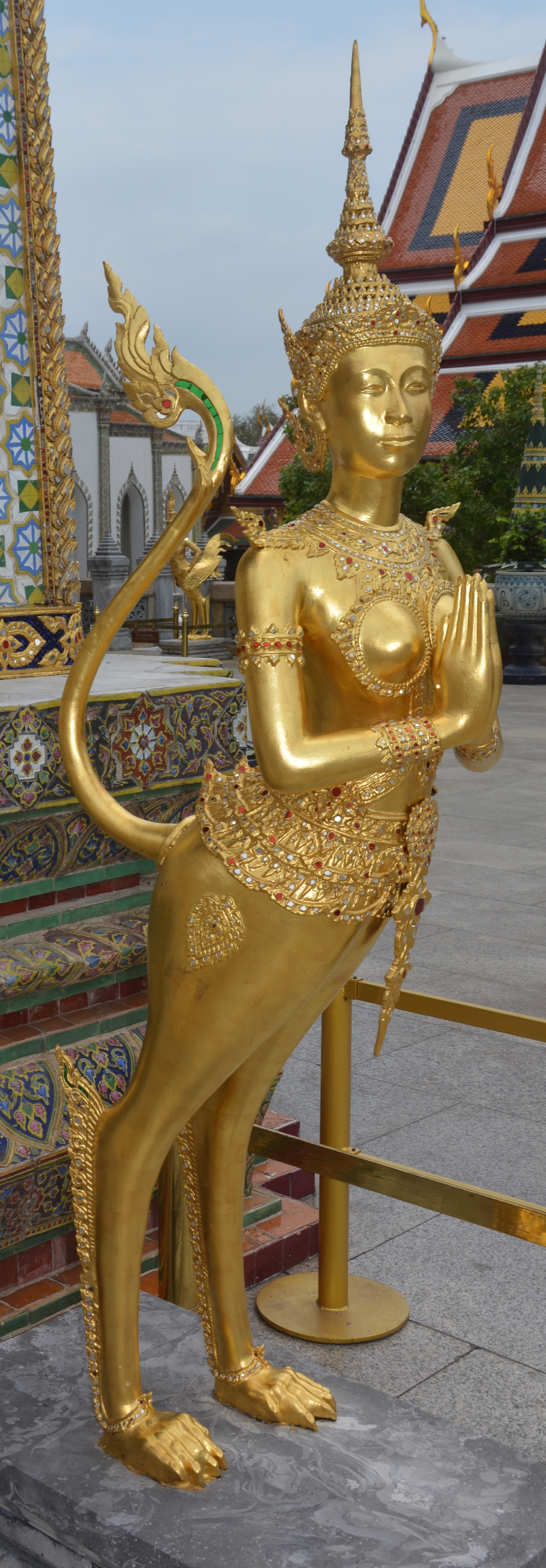
Apsonsi statue in Wat Phra Kaew

Apsonsi (Thai: อัปสรสีห์) is a half-woman half-lion mythical creature from Thai mythology. Apsonsi is one of the many hybrid creatures depicted in ancient South and Southeast Asian folklore. Also called Apsonsingh, Apsonsingha, Apsarasingha or Apsarasingh, being the compound of an Apsara (Apson) and a singha (singh), that is a female nymph and a lion. The combination of a male angel and a lion is called Thepnorasi. It is comparable to the Manussiha, a half-lion half-man Burmese mythical creature.

In Legend, Apsonsi lived in Himavanta, an invisible mythical forest set deep in the Himalaya Mountains. The Apsonsi is a half-woman, half-lion figure believed to be the protector from harm. Apsonsi figures stand guard at Wat Phra Kaew (The Emerald Buddha Temple), a historic site in Bangkok, Thailand.

== See also ==
- Kinnara
- Sphinx

== Sources ==
- "The World's Only Thai Town". Thai Community Development Center.
- "Kinnari and Apsonsi, All the Legends, Myths and Mysteries". Luxury Thailand Travel.
