= Rukdiew Cafe =

Thai restaurant in Portland, Oregon, U.S.

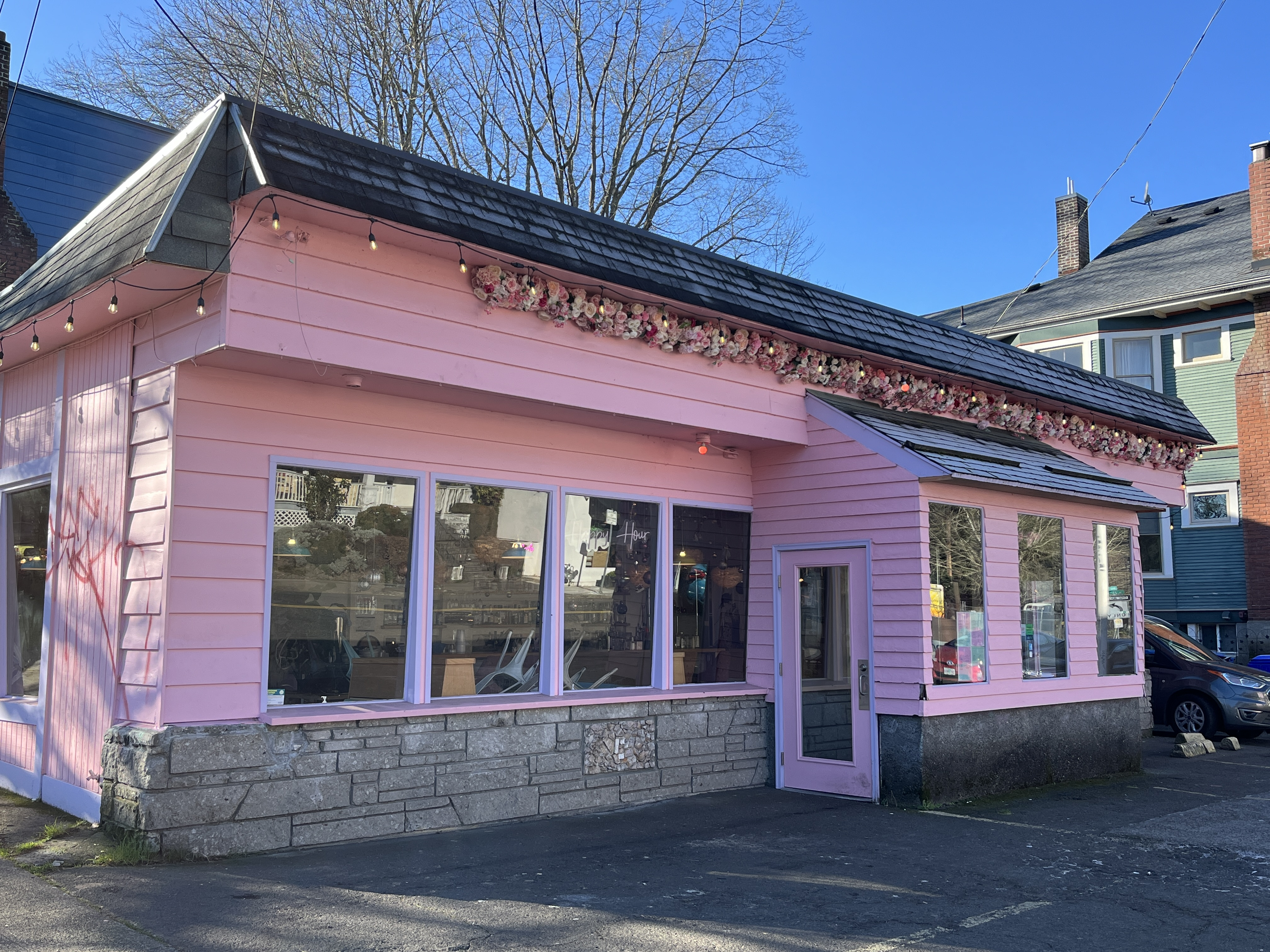
- The restaurant's exterior, 2025
- Interactive map of Rukdiew Cafe

Restaurant information
- Established: 2022
- Owner: Poomipat "Pat" Thaithongsuk
- Food type: Thai
- Location: 2534 Southeast Belmont Street, Portland, Multnomah, Oregon, 97214, United States
- Coordinates: 45.5163°N 122.6394°W

Rukdiew Cafe (sometimes RukDiew Cafe) is a Thai restaurant in Portland, Oregon. Owner Poomipat "Pat" Thaithongsuk opened the restaurant in southeast Portland's Buckman neighborhood in 2022. Rukdiew Cafe has garnered a positive reception and was named one of Portland's 25 best new restaurants by The Oregonian.

== Description ==
The Thai restaurant Rukdiew Cafe operates on Belmont Street in southeast Portland's Buckman neighborhood. The name Rukdiew (or RukDiew) translates to "one love" in Thai.

The Oregonian's Michael Russell has described Rukdiew as a "lively bar lined with tufted pink chairs and a similarly colorful menu of familiar Thai dishes". Thom Hilton of Willamette Week called the restaurant queer-friendly and said, "RukDiew's design, influenced by dreams and fairy tales, is both peaceful and playful, with framed illustrations on the walls, light fixtures that resemble clouds and eclectically patterned plates." He also called the cafe a "pastel pink and green oasis, decorated with quirky prints and hanging ornaments".

=== Menu ===
The menu includes pad Thai with fried trout or soft-shell crab, hot wings with basil leaves and egg noodles, crab rangoon with pineapple sauce, rolls with tofu and peanut sauce, and somtum (salad with green papaya and peanuts). The restaurant has also served khao soi (noodles in a Northern-style curry sauce), panang curry with shrimp, kana moo grob (pork belly stir fried with Chinese broccoli in a soy and oyster sauce), pineapple fried rice, and pad kee mow. Dessert options include sticky rice with mango, as well as lava cake. The drink menu includes Thai tea, a mango mojito, a lychee martini, and a plum sangria. The Cherry Blossom is a non-alcoholic drink with lychee and pomegranate juice.

== History ==
The team behind Thai Peacock and more Khao Moo Dang opened Rukdiew Cafe in 2022. Poomipat "Pat" Thaithongsuk is the owner.

The restaurant was a vendor at the new Taste of Thailand festival in 2024. It participated in Portland's Dumpling Week in 2026.

== Reception ==
Michael Russell included Rukdiew in The Oregonian's list of Portland's 25 best new restaurants of 2022. In 2022, Willamette Week's Thom Hilton said the pad kee mow was the best he has tried in Portland and wrote, "I'd stack this exceptional restaurant alongside the titans of Portland's Thai food scene. I, personally, cannot wait to make RukDiew Cafe my regular spot." He also called Rukdiew a "new regular Thai spot for curry crab rangoon and make-your-own cotton candy in pink fairyland digs". Willamette Week has also called the hot wings "heavenly" and possibly "the most sought-after Thai appetizer in Portland".

Brooke Jackson-Glidden and Nick Woo included the khao soi in Eater Portland's 2023 list of sixteen "soul-soothing" noodle soups in Portland, writing that it "has leapt in front of the pack when it comes to some of the city's great versions of the dish". Jackson-Glidden also included Rukdiew in a 2023 overview of recommended eateries for "marvelous mid-week lunch" in the city, again opining that the cafe had Portland's "finest" khao soi. In the website's 2024 overview of recommended eateries on "restaurant-packed" Belmont Street, Katrina Yentch called Rukdiew's approach to Thai cuisine "bright and precise". She recommended the boat noodles, the khao soi, and the pad Thai with soft shell crab, as well as the green, massaman, and red curries.

== See also ==
- List of Thai restaurants
