= Rhong-Tiam =

Defunct Thai restaurant in New York City, U.S.

- Interactive map of Rhong-Tiam

Restaurant information
- Established: March 2008
- Chef: Andy Yang
- Food type: Thai
- Location: 541 LaGuardia Place, New York City, New York, 10012, United States
- Coordinates: 40°43′43″N 73°59′53″W

Rhong-Tiam was a Thai restaurant in New York City. Andy Yang was the chef. The restaurant had received a Michelin star before closing.

== See also ==
- List of defunct restaurants of the United States
- List of Michelin-starred restaurants in New York City
- List of Thai restaurants
