= North Irvington Gardens Historic District =

Historic district in Indiana, United States

- U.S. National Register of Historic Places
- U.S. Historic district
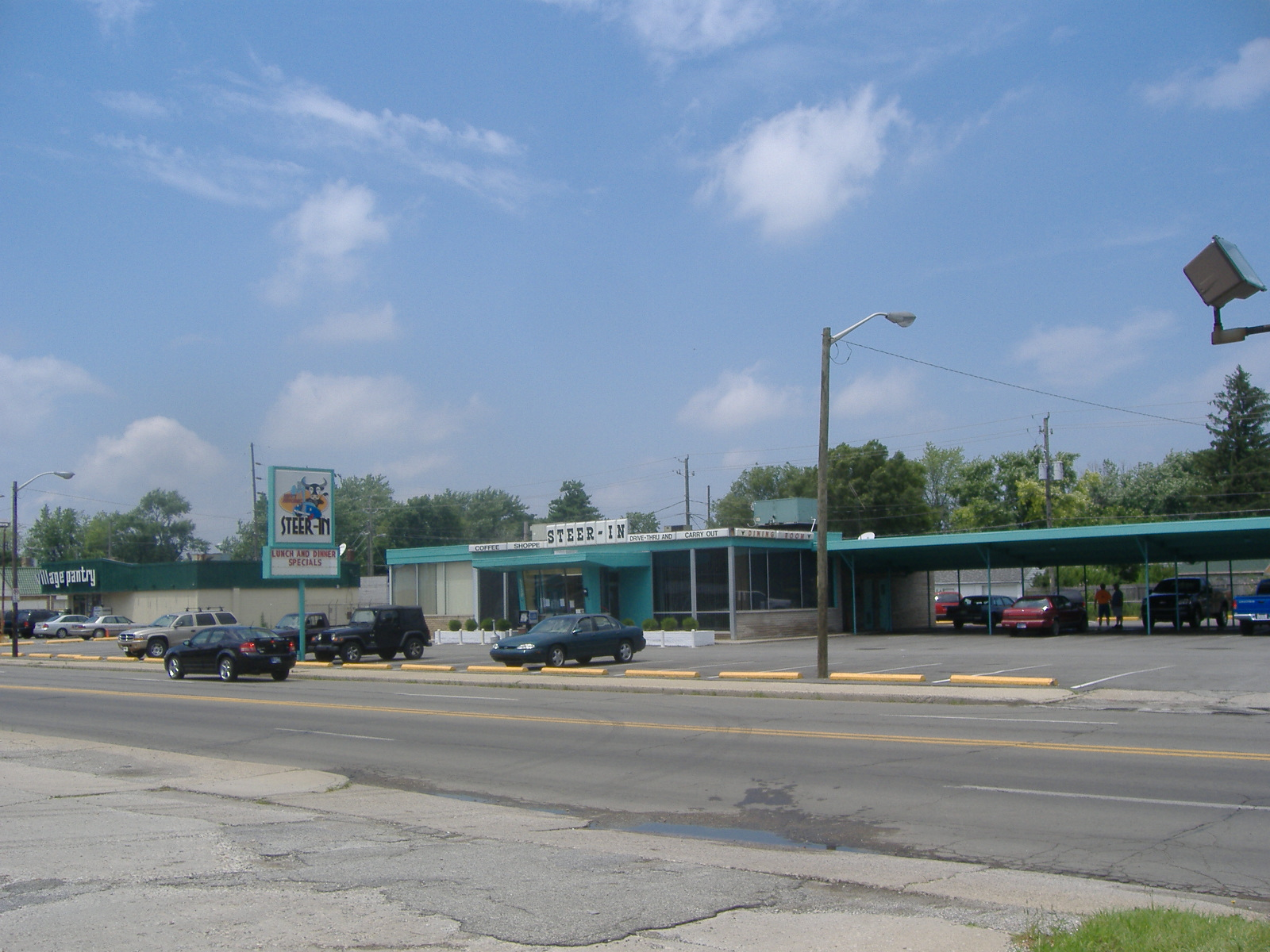
- Harold's Steer-In, a fixture of the District

- Location within Indianapolis Location within Indiana Location within the United States
- Location: Roughly bounded by 11th St., 10th St., Arlington Ave., Pleasant Run Pkwy N. Dr., Ritter Ave., St. Clair St., and Emerson Ave., Indianapolis, Indiana
- Coordinates: 39.779°N 86.074°W
- Area: 2,660 acres (1,080 ha)
- Built: 1910-1955
- Architect: Multiple
- Architectural style: Late 19th And 20th Century Revivals, Bungalow/Craftsman, American Four Square
- NRHP reference No.: 08000557
- Added to NRHP: June 27, 2008

The North Irvington Gardens Historic District is a neighborhood and national historic district in Indianapolis, Indiana. It was placed on the National Register of Historic Places on June 27, 2008. It is immediately to the north of the Irvington Historic District, which has been on the National Register since 1987, sharing the same east and west boundaries of the older district (Arlington Avenue and Emerson Avenue, respectively), and extending north to 10th and 11th streets. It is a neighborhood of mostly residential buildings dating primarily from 1910 to 1950, with no one distinctive architectural style, including a house associated with the historic Osborn Farm. Except for one church, the only buildings contributing to the historic nature of the district are 843 houses and 551 garages. Most fences in the district mark the perimeter of the individual properties; very few are along the streets.

The district was placed on the register for three reasons. First, it reflects residential development trends during its time of significance. Second, noted author Margaret Weymouth Jackson lived in the district between World War I and World War II. Finally, it reflects the various styles used in residence in a "textbook" manner, particularly "small houses".

One of the prominent structures in the district is Harold's Steer-In, built in 1951. It is a contributing building even though it was built one year after the era of notability. Originally named Northways Restaurant when it opened in 1951, it became Laughner's Cafeteria from the mid-1950s to 1964, at which time it gained the name Harold's Steer-In. It has remained open since then except for three weeks in 2004 when it seemed to have closed for good until two employees invested in the restaurant and reopened it in time for a special Thanksgiving Day feast for loyal customers. It is one of the few surviving authentic drive-ins left in Indianapolis. Peyton Manning once filmed a commercial for MasterCard in the building in 2005.

The Irvington Development Organization was the driving force in obtaining National Register status for the district. Money from a Preserve America grant given to the organization funded this effort.

== See also ==
- National Register of Historic Places listings in Marion County, Indiana
