= Manussiha =

Burmese mythical creature

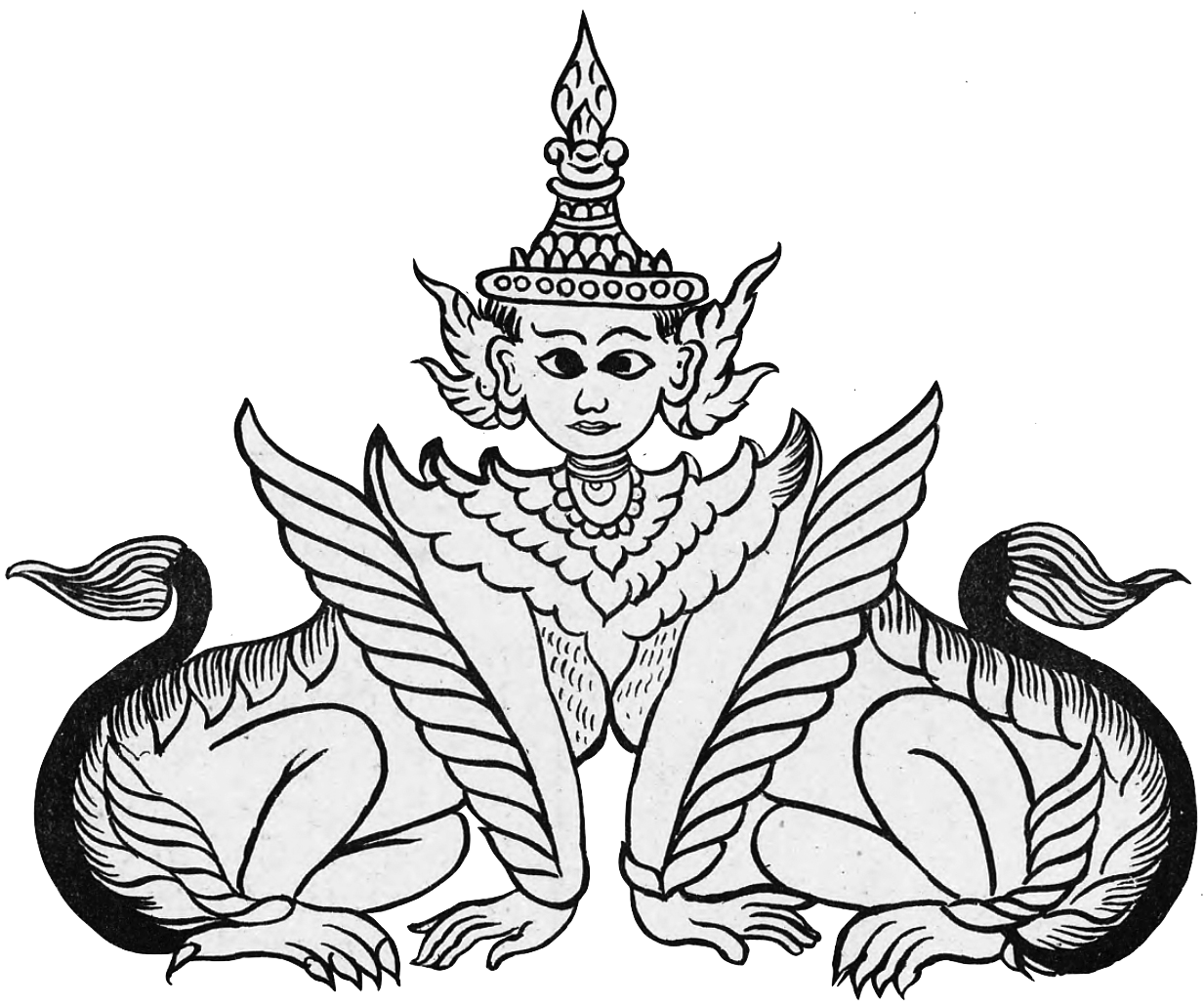

Manussiha (Burmese: မနုဿီဟ, (Note: MLCTS: ma.nu.ssiha.; ALA-LC: manussīha; BGN/PCGN: manuthiha / manokthiha / manotthiha / ma note thiha) Shan: မၼုၵ်ႉသီႇႁႃႉ, (Note: manuk siha) Pali: manussīha, lit. 'man-lion'), is a Burmese half-man half-lion mythical creature believed to be created by Buddhist missionary monks to protect a new-born royal baby from being devoured by rakshasis (ogresses) from the sea. Its statues are usually found guarding the four corners of a pagoda. It has a human head and torso and lion hindquarters. Thus, it can be called a Burmese sphinx. Notably, Manussiha is the symbol in the seal of Shwedagon Pagoda and the patch badge of Shwe Dagon Pagoda Security.

== Etymology ==
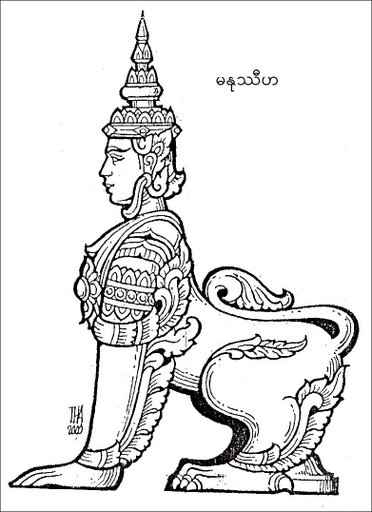
Side view of a Manussiha in a dictionary

Manussīha(မနုဿီဟ) is a combination of two Pali words; Manussa(မနုဿ) meaning "human" and Sīha(သီဟ) meaning "lion". Thus, it can be literally translated as "Man-lion".

The Myanmar-English Dictionary, published by the Myanmar Language Commission, defined မနုဿီဟ as:

မနုဿီဟ

fabulous creature with a man's torso and a lion's hindquarters, depicted in a squatting posture on forked haunches

[Pali မနုဿ + သီဟ]

== History ==
The most famous version of history of Manussīha is from Sāsanālaṅkāya Treatises (သာသနာလင်္ကာရစာတမ်း). (Note: In 1193 ME (1831 CE), by the order of the King Mindon, the interior minister and governor of Hsaw Thiri Maha Nanda Thingyan (Sīrimahānandasaṅkran) asked questions and the king's counselor minister Maha Dhamma Thingyan (Mahādhammasaṅkran) answered them, referencing on various canons and scriptures, then the questions and answers were written as the treatises and read out in the royal court. The treatises was clarified and published by Rangoon Hanthawadyy Pitakat Press in 1956.) According to that treatises, Manussīha, first appeared in 235 BE (309 BCE), is not a real creature, but a statue in order to frighten the ogres, demons and evil spirits.

In 235th year after Parinibbāna of Lord Buddha, the Buddhist missionary of five mathērs (senior monks) led by Soṇa and Uttara arrived at Sadhuim of Suvaṇṇabhūmi where the king Sirīmāsoka was reigning at that time. As the city is near the sea, the bīlūḥmas (belumas or ogresses) living in the sea had been coming to eat the babies from the royal households. On the same day when the missionaries arrived, the queen had just born a baby and the 500 bīlūḥmas were coming. The people were seriously frightened by seeing these. The missionary monks then used their Abhiññā Iddhi power to create 1000 frightening images, with a human head and two hindquarters of lions (thus called as Manussīha (Man-lion)), to surround the bīlūḥmas who frightened and ran away after that. The monks then recite the Paritta protections to prevent returning of bīlūḥs and other bad creatures. All the people converted to Buddhism, and 3500 men including 1500 princes were willingly ordained as monks. After that, Manussīha figures drawn on palm leaves were put as amulets on children's head to protect them from bad creatures. A rock Mannusīha statue was erected on the mountain northeast of Sadhuim (modern day Thaton). (Note: The Sāsanālaṅkāya Treatises, clarified and first published in 1956, states that this rock Manussīha statue still existing there. Someone should prove whether the statue is still existing.)

There are different versions of that history, only different in stating the name and location of the capital city of Suvaṇṇabhūmi. Sadhuim is the short form of Suddhammapura. Some sources say the capital city is Suddhammavati. Some other authoritative sources say that its name was Taikkala (from Golamatti in Pali, through Mon-Tuik gala). The authoritative sources states that half of the city was located on top of Mount Kelasa while the rest was on the adjoining plain.

== Gallery ==
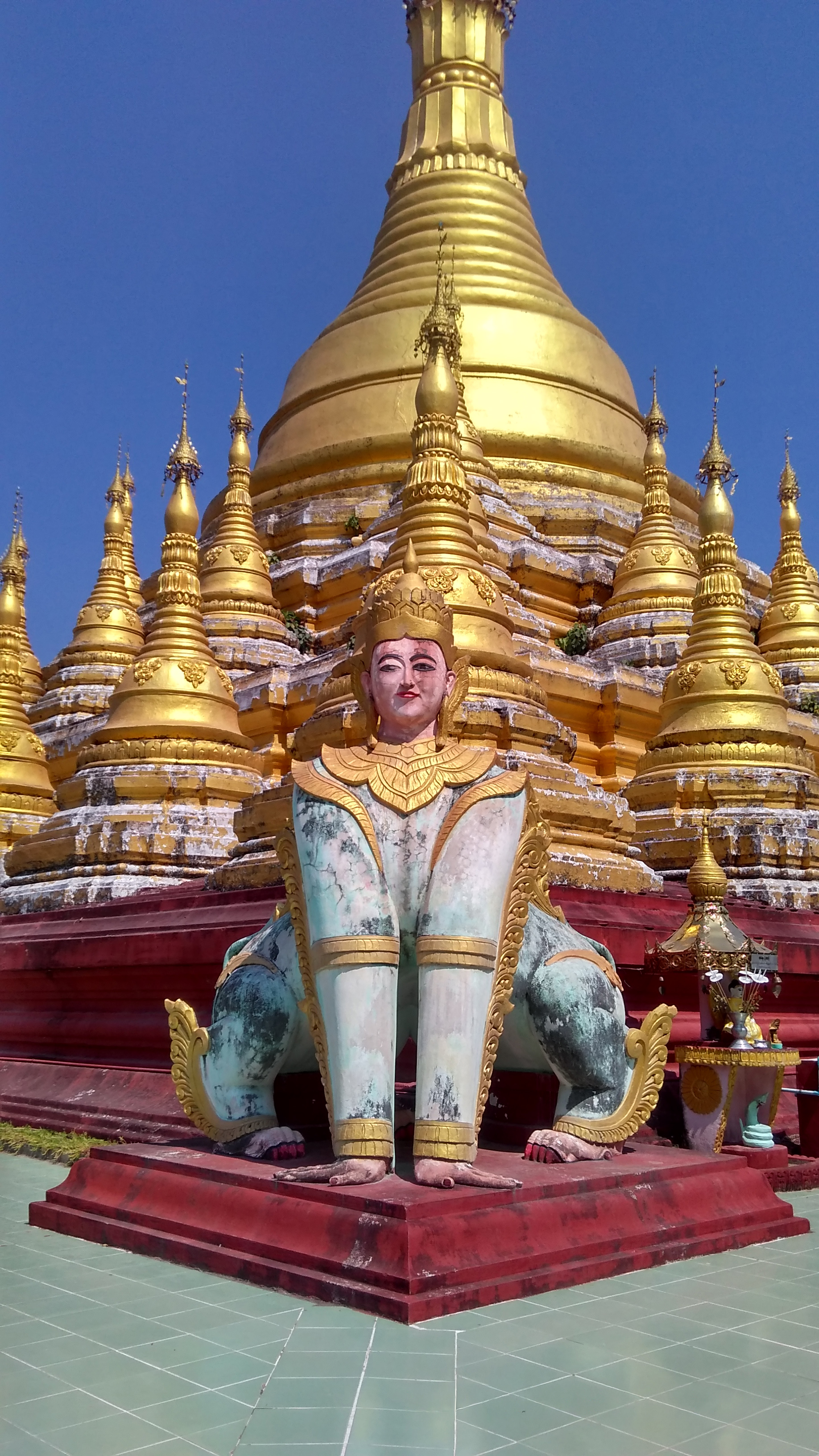
Manussiha sculpture at Myat Saw Nyi Naung Pagoda

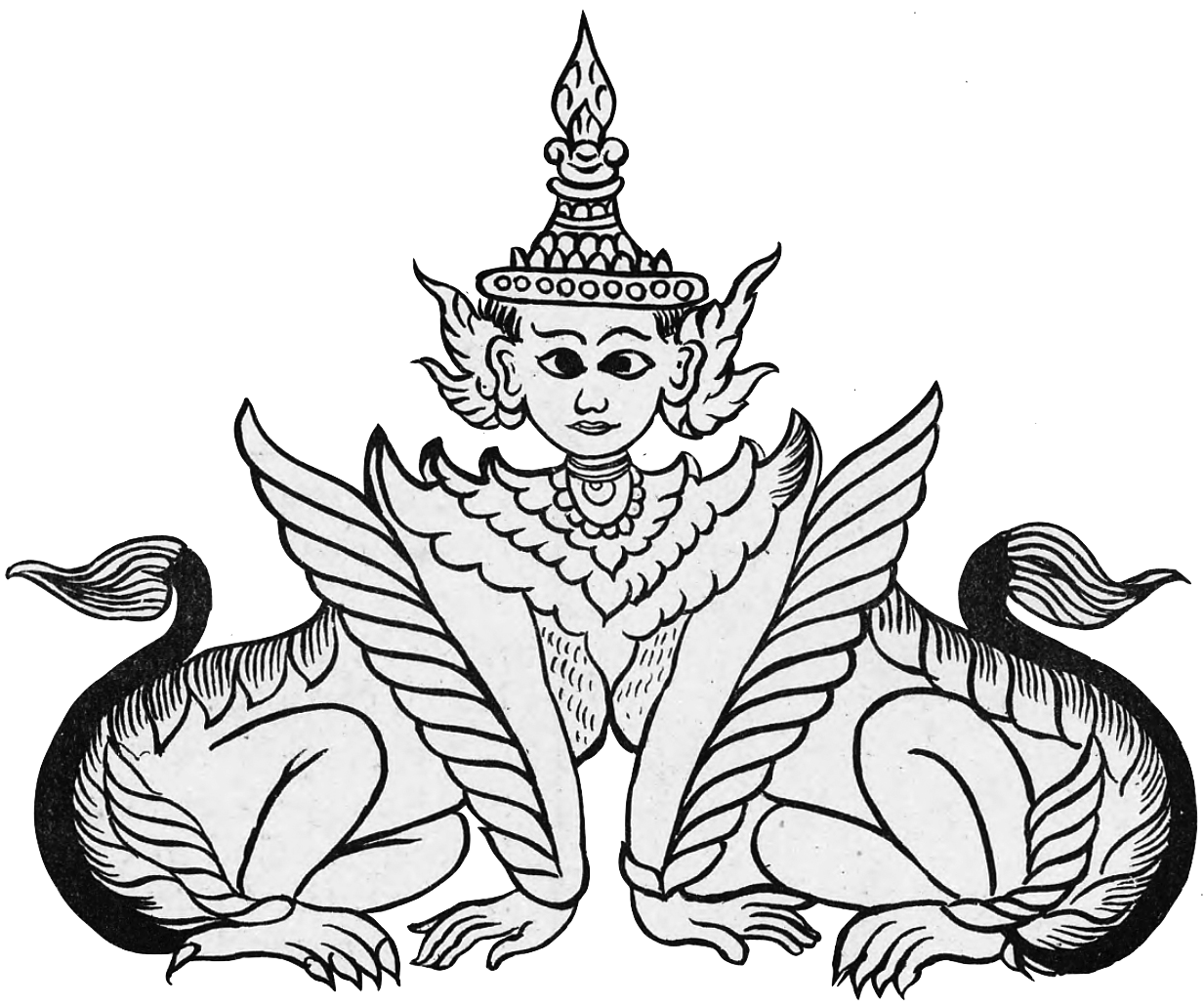
Manussiha in a book about Nats

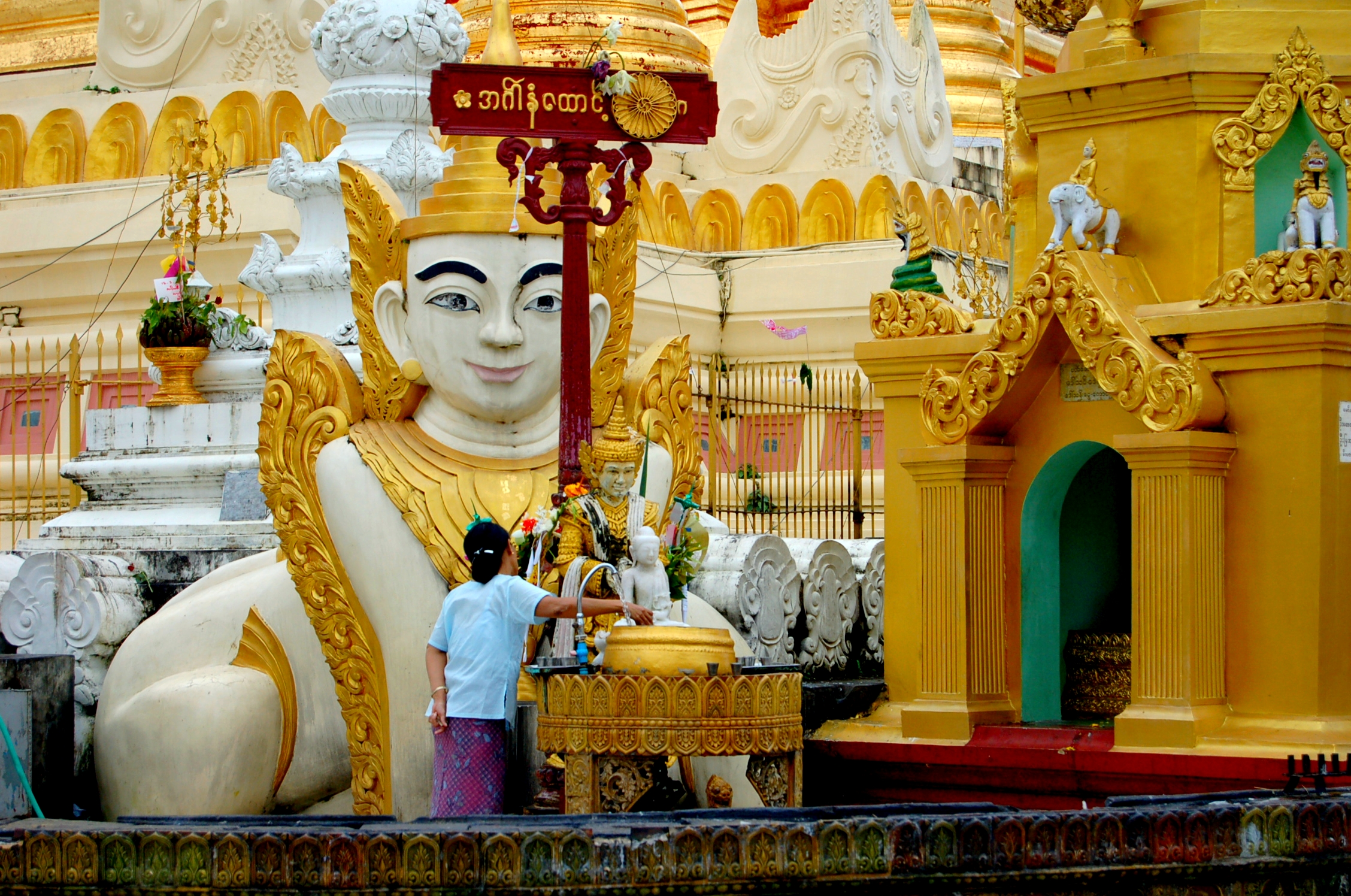
The planetary post for Tuesday, associated with the lion, at the Shwedagon Pagoda. A Burmese sphinx (Manussiha) statue stands in the background.

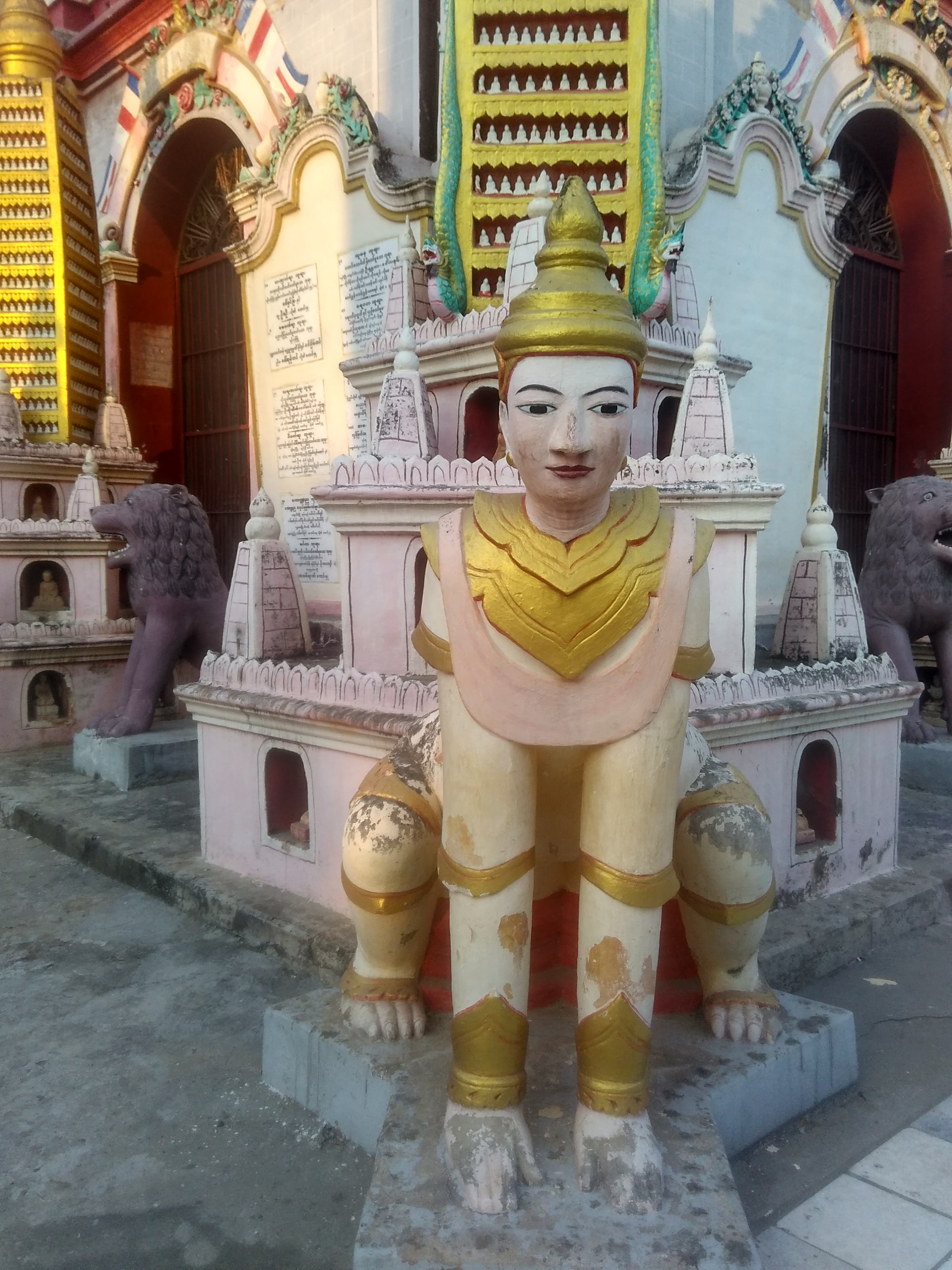
A Manussiha statue in Sambuddhe Pagoda

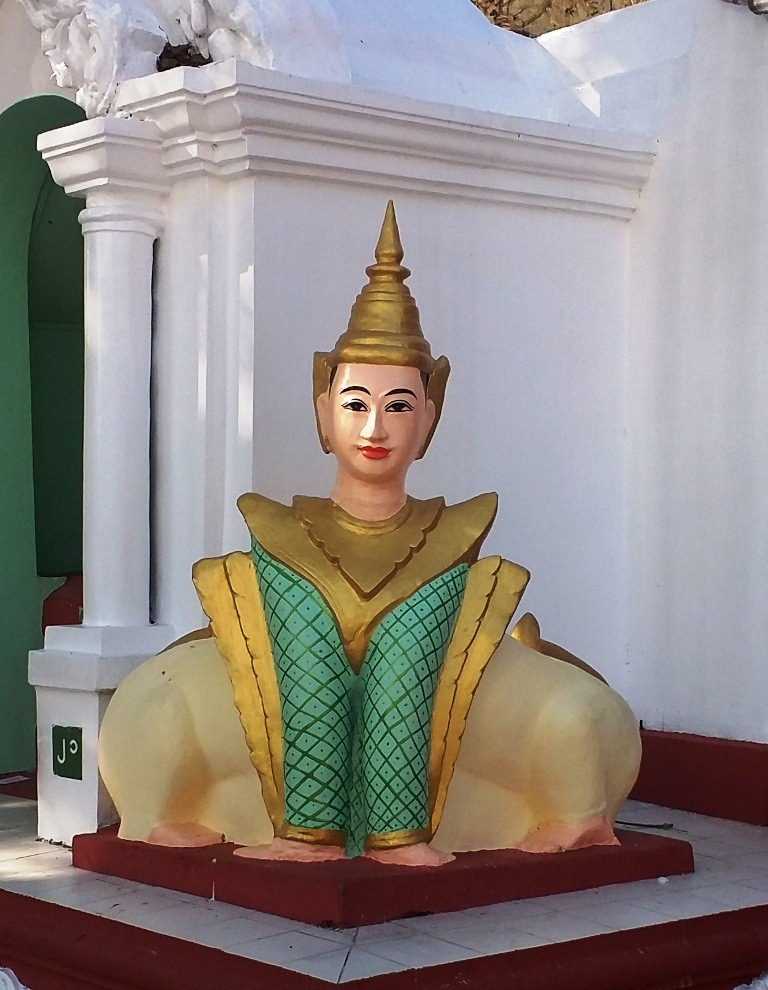
