= West Salem Historic District =

Historic district in North Carolina, United States

- U.S. National Register of Historic Places
- U.S. Historic district
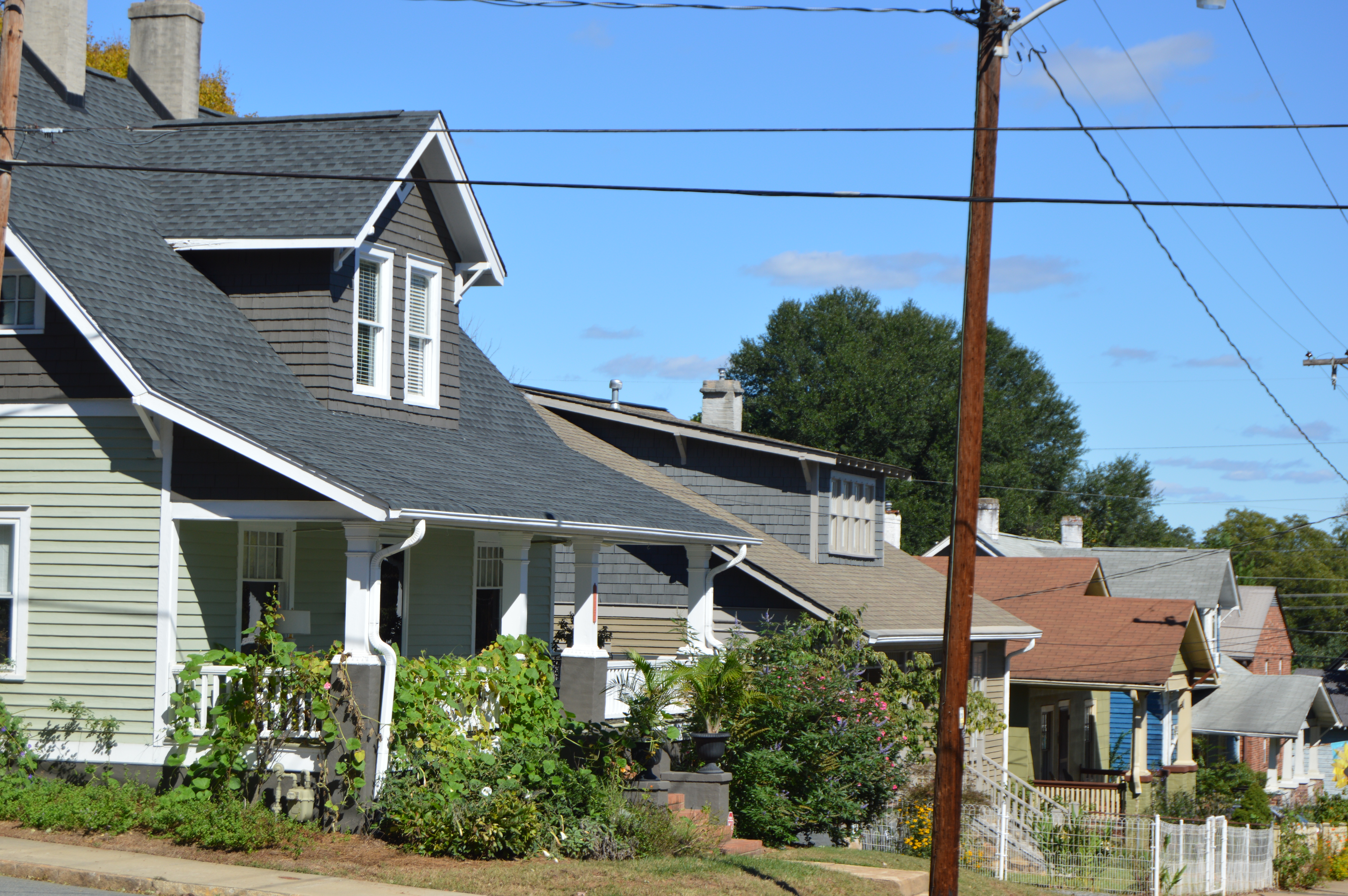
- Bungalows on West Street

- Location within North Carolina Location within the United States
- Location: Roughly bounded by Business 40, Poplar, Salem Ave., Walnut, Shober, Hutton Sts, Granville Dr. and Beaumont St., Winston-Salem, North Carolina
- Coordinates: 36°05′12″N 80°14′58″W
- Area: 350 acres (140 ha)
- Built: c. 1843
- Architectural style: Queen Anne, Bungalow/craftsman, Colonial Revival
- NRHP reference No.: 04001524
- Added to NRHP: January 19, 2005

West Salem Historic District is a national historic district located at Winston-Salem, Forsyth County, North Carolina. The district encompasses 591 contributing buildings, 1 contributing site, and 3 contributing structures in a largely residential section of Winston-Salem. The buildings date from about 1843 to 1957, and include notable examples of Colonial Revival, Queen Anne, and American Craftsman style architecture, as well as bungalows. Notable resources include the M. D. Gantt Building (1931), Coca-Cola bottling plant (1930), Christ Moravian Church (1895), and Green Street Methodist Church (1921).

It was listed on the National Register of Historic Places in 2005.
