= Baan Lao Fine Thai Cuisine =

Thai restaurant in Richmond, Canada

- Interactive map of Baan Lao Fine Thai Cuisine

Restaurant information
- Established: 2021; 5 years ago
- Chef: Nutcha Phanthoupheng
- Location: 4100 Bayview Street, Richmond, British Columbia, Canada
- Coordinates: 49°07′23″N 123°10′43″W
- Reservations: Yes
- Website: baanlao.ca

Baan Lao Fine Thai Cuisine is a restaurant in the Steveston neighbourhood of Richmond, British Columbia, Canada. It was opened in February 2021 by chef Nutcha Phanthoupheng. The restaurant was named Canada's Best Restaurant at the World Culinary Awards twice, in 2024 and 2025. It was also titled North America's Best Restaurant 2026 by the World Culinary Awards.

== History ==
The name Baan Lao translates to "our home" in Thai. Nutcha Phanthoupheng was born in the Isan region of northeastern Thailand, where she had previously worked as a nurse and cancer researcher before immigrating to Canada in 2014. She opened Baan Lao in Steveston in February 2021.

Before opening the restaurant, Phanthoupheng trained in Thailand under chef Chumpol Jangprai, a two-Michelin-star recipient, and under Vichit Mukura, a chef who had cooked for the Thai royal family.

== Cuisine ==
Baan Lao serves an 18-course tasting menu drawing on royal Thai culinary traditions. Ingredients include proteins and produce from Canadian farms and fishers, among them Nova Scotia lobster and British Columbia water buffalo. Organic rice is imported from Phanthoupheng's family farm in Thailand's Isan region.

== Recognition ==
At the World Culinary Awards, Baan Lao was named Canada's Best Restaurant in 2024 and 2025, becoming the first Canadian restaurant to win the award in consecutive years. In September 2025, it was ranked 12th on the inaugural North America's 50 Best Restaurants list and received the award for Best Restaurant in West Canada. Canada's 100 Best Restaurants named it Best Destination Restaurant in Canada for 2025.

Phanthoupheng was designated a Maître Rôtisseur by La Chaîne des Rôtisseurs, described as the first Thai chef in Canada to receive this distinction.

== Expansion ==
Phanthoupheng and her husband signed a lease for two locations on Granville Island in Vancouver.
