= Preserve America =

U.S. government cultural heritage program

Preserve America road sign in Oak Ridge, Tennessee, including the program logo

Preserve America is a United States government program, established under President George W. Bush, intended to encourage and support community efforts to preserve and enjoy the country's cultural and natural heritage.

As of 2017, more than 900 communities, representing all 50 states, Washington, D.C., American Samoa, and the U.S. Virgin Islands, have been designated as "Preserve America Communities". Designated communities become eligible to apply for Preserve America grants to enhance heritage tourism and the use of community historic and cultural sites. Federal budget allocations for Preserve America grants totaled approximately $5 million in fiscal year 2007 and $7.5 million in fiscal year 2008. Designated communities also receive White House recognition, a certificate of recognition, a Preserve America Community road sign, listing in the Preserve America Community directory on the program's website, authorization to use the Preserve America logo, inclusion in national and regional press releases, and official notification of the designation to state tourism offices and visitors bureaus.

Executive Order 13287, "Preserve America", signed by President Bush on March 3, 2003, established a federal policy to provide leadership in preserving the nation's heritage by actively advancing the protection, enhancement, and contemporary use of historic properties owned by the federal government. The order encourages federal agencies to seek partnerships with state, tribal, and local governments and the private sector to make more efficient and informed use of these resources for economic development and other recognized public benefits. In addition, it directs the secretary of commerce to assist in development of local and regional heritage tourism programs. Legislation providing permanent authorization for the Preserve America program was passed by the U.S. Congress and signed by President Barack Obama in March 2009.

The Preserve America program is jointly administered by the Advisory Council on Historic Preservation and Department of the Interior in partnership with the U.S. Departments of Agriculture, Commerce, Defense, Education, Housing and Urban Development, and Transportation; U.S. General Services Administration; National Endowment for the Humanities; President's Committee on the Arts and Humanities; Institute of Museum and Library Services; and Council on Environmental Quality. Laura Bush, former first lady of the United States, was the Honorary Chair of Preserve America from the program's inception. Her successor as First Lady, Michelle Obama, continued that tradition by serving an honorary role in supporting and promoting Preserve America.

== See also ==
- List of Preserve America Communities
