= Yaowarat (restaurant) =

Asian restaurant in Portland, Oregon, U.S.

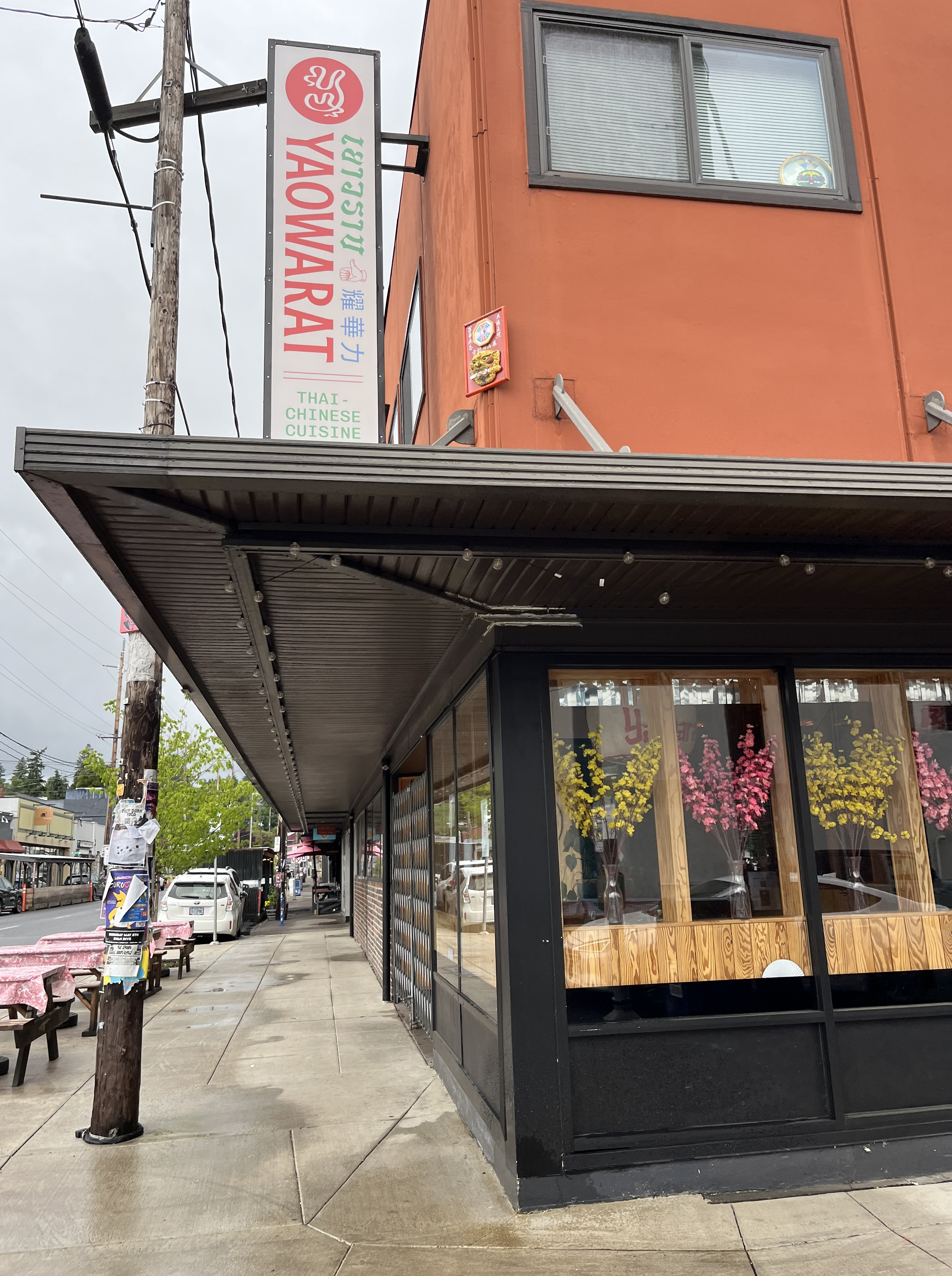
- The restaurant's exterior in 2025
- Interactive map of Yaowarat

Restaurant information
- Established: October 2023
- Food type: Thai; Chinese
- Location: 7937 Southeast Stark Street, Portland, Multnomah, Oregon, 97215, United States
- Coordinates: 45.5193°N 122.5817°W
- Website: yaowaratpdx.com

Yaowarat is an Asian restaurant in Portland, Oregon, in the United States. Akkapong "Earl" Ninsom opened the restaurant in the Montavilla neighborhood in October 2023, serving Thai and Chinese cuisine. Yaowarat has garnered a positive reception and was named one of the ten best new restaurants by The Oregonian as well as Restaurant of the Year by Portland Monthly.

== Description ==
Yaowarat serves Thai and Chinese cuisine on Southeast Stark Street in Portland's Montavilla neighborhood. The menu has grilled squid, mapo tofu, and pickled cabbage salad, as well as chive cakes, dumplings, and kuay teow kua gai. The dessert menu includes toasted buns served with pandan and Thai tea custards. On the drink menu, the Same But Prettier has Thai tea-infused rum and coconut-jasmine horchata.

== History ==
Inspired by and named after Bangkok's Chinatown, Akkapong "Earl" Ninsom—whose other restaurants include Eem, Hat Yai, Langbaan, and PaaDee—opened Yaowarat on October 6, 2023, in the space previously occupied by The Country Cat and later Lazy Susan. There were opening delays; in March 2023, Eater Portland said the restaurant was slated to open in late July or early August. In 2024, Sam Smith was the chef and Yaowarat began offering lunch service on weekends.

== Reception ==
Yaowarat was Portland Monthly's Restaurant of the Year for 2023. The business ranked fifth in The Oregonian's list of Portland's best new restaurants of 2023. The newspaper's Michael Russell included the chive cakes in an overview of the year's best new dishes in the city. He also included the business in the newspaper's 2025 list of the 21 best restaurants in southeast Portland.

Krista Garcia of The Infatuation included Yaowarat in a 2024 list of the 24 best restaurants in Portland and wrote, "a trip to this fun, casual spot ... is your chance to enjoy grilled squid swimming in spicy dressing, some of the silkiest mapo tofu you've ever tasted, and bright curries like Yaowarat's green version with springy fish balls and winter melon." She recommended the "fanciful" cocktails over the Singha.

Thom Hilton of Eater Portland said the dumplings, chive cakes, Chinese sashimi, wide rice noodles, grilled buns, and limeade slushies were the best restaurant meal he had in 2023. Garcia and Katrina Yentch also included Yaowarat in the website's 2024 overview of eateries for "stunning" Thai cuisine in the metropolitan area, recommending the toasted buns for dessert. The business was included in Time Out Portland's 2025 list of the city's eighteen best restaurants.

== See also ==
- List of Chinese restaurants
- List of Thai restaurants
