= Earl Ninsom =

Chef and restaurateur

- Born: Akkapong Ninsom; Bangkok, Thailand
- Occupations: Chef; restaurateur

Akkapong "Earl" Ninsom is an American chef and restaurateur in Portland, Oregon. His Thai-focused restaurants include Eem, Hat Yai, Langbaan, OK Chicken and Khao Soi, PaaDee, Phuket Cafe, and Yaowarat, some of which have been recognized by the James Beard Foundation Awards.

== Early and personal life ==
Ninsom was born in Bangkok, and relocated in Portland, Oregon.

== See also ==
- Lazy Susan (restaurant)
- List of chefs
- List of people from Portland, Oregon
- List of restaurateurs
