= Redwood (restaurant) =

Restaurant in Portland, Oregon, U.S.

- Interactive map of Redwood

Restaurant information
- Established: January 2013
- Owners: Chantel Chinco; Brenda Dunn
- Previous owners: Jessie Hawkins; Susie McWilliam; Austin Putnam
- Location: 7915 Southeast Stark Street, Portland, Multnomah, Oregon, 97215, United States
- Coordinates: 45.5193°N 122.5821°W
- Website: redwoodpdx.com

Redwood is a restaurant in Portland, Oregon, United States. Established in 2013, it operates in the southeast Portland part of the Montavilla neighborhood.

== Description ==
The gastropub Redwood operates on Stark Street in the southeast Portland part of the Montavilla neighborhood. The interior has redwood tabletops and walls. Thrillist has described the restaurant as an "arboreal meat-and-whiskey palace ... full of low lights [and] High Life".

=== Menu ===
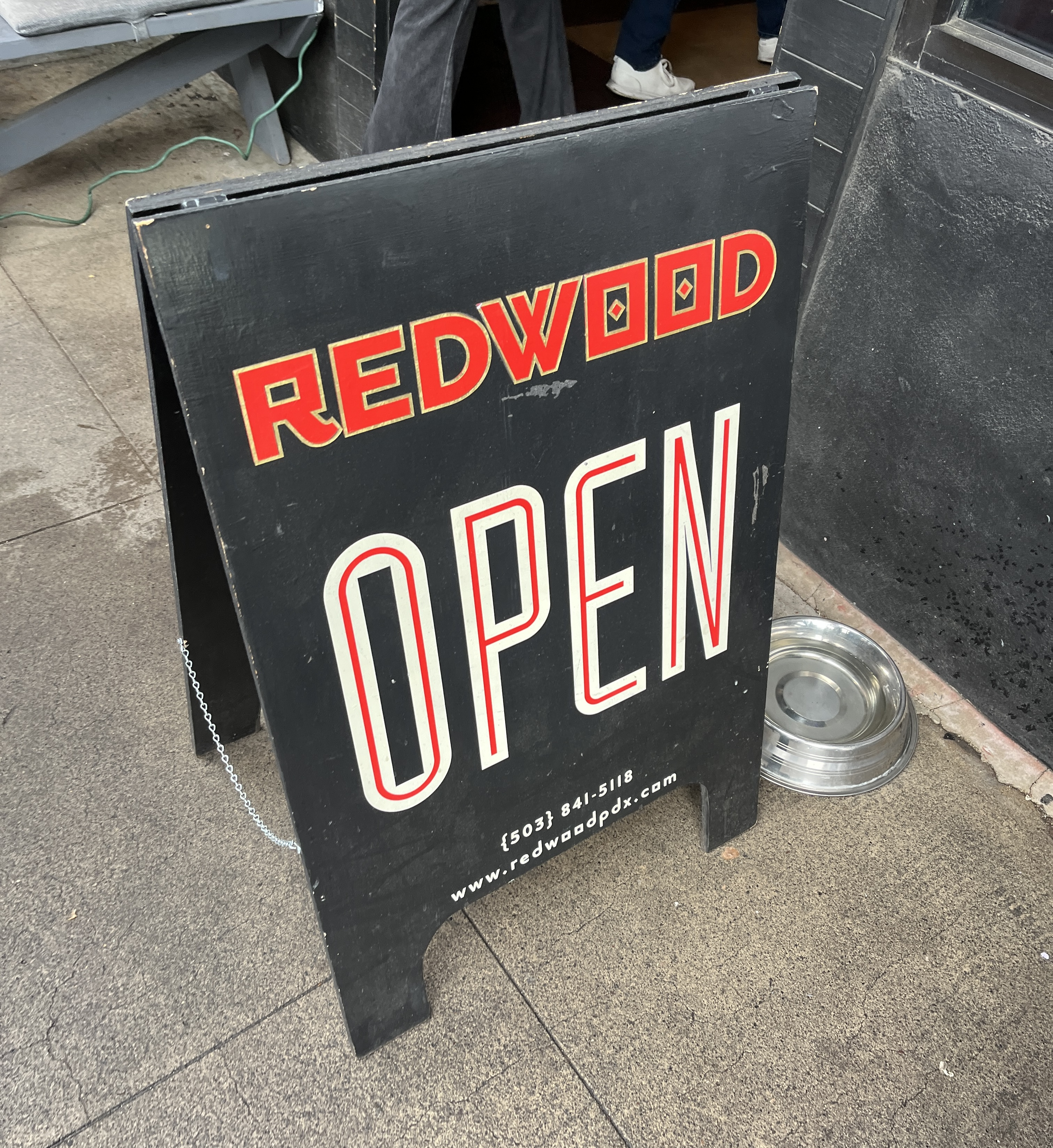
Sign for the restaurant, 2025

The menu has been described as "upscale seasonal comfort food" and has four sections: starters, salads, sandwiches, and "meals". Appetizers include apple fritters and fried brussels sprouts. The menu also includes grilled vegetable and pork shank sandwiches, pot roast, stewed chicken, and mussels frites. The restaurant has also served burgers; chilaquiles with roasted chicken, fried tortillas, green sauce, sour cream, queso fresco, and fried egg; curry roasted chicken with fried potato pancake, green papaya salad; and cohinita pibil. Dressings, pickles, pico de gallo, salsa, and other sauces are made in-house.

Brunch options include cheddar and corn fritters, a breakfast sandwich with roasted pork shoulder and eggs, smoked trout hash, wheat berries, and baked eggs. Redwood has also served hash browns, oatmeal waffles with sides of bacon and eggs, and scrambles with ingredients such as basil, spinach, and tomato. In addition to salads and sandwiches, the lunch menu includes soups and French fries. Dessert options have included chocolate brownie, chocolate buttermilk cake with ganache, and panna cotta with raspberry coulis.

Among cocktails is the Redwood Original, which has Bulleit Bourbon, vermouth, and Angostura bitters, as well as cherry-, lime-, and orange juice. The Wooden Nickel has Laphroaig and vodka, and the Indian Summer has Campari, St-Germain, and grapefruit juice. Redwood's drink menu also has a Bloody Mary.

== History ==
Media outlets began reporting about Redwood's planned opening in November and December 2012. Chef Susie McWilliam opened Redwood in January 2013, in the space that previously housed Thai restaurant Bangkok Bites. Jessie Hawkins and Austin Putnam have also been credited as founders and co-owners. Brunch service launched in July 2013. In 2022, the owner sold the business to longtime employee Chantel Chinco and Brenda Dunn.

City Commissioner Jo Ann Hardesty spoke to supporters at Redwood on election night (May 17) in 2022. In 2024, the restaurant hosted a Strawberry Social happy hour in conjuncion with Montavilla Farmers Market's Berry Bash Summer Celebration.

== Reception ==
Penelope Bass of Willamette Week said Redwood's food menu was " solid all the way around" in 2016. The newspaper's Casey Jarman said the business was Montavilla's "best breakfast spot" in 2013. Jarman wrote, "While it's facing increasingly tough brunch competition from the likes of its neighbors Lazy Susan and the earlier-rising Hungry Heart Bakery, the cozy and dim-lit Redwood remains the unique and hearty center of a.m. culture on Montavilla's main drag."
