= Lazy Susan (disambiguation) =

Lazy Susan may refer to:

- Lazy Susan
- Lazy Susan (drag queen)
- Lazy Susan (film)
- Lazy Susan (restaurant)
- Lazy Susan (song)
