= MidCity SmashedBurger =

Restaurant chain based in Portland, Oregon, U.S.

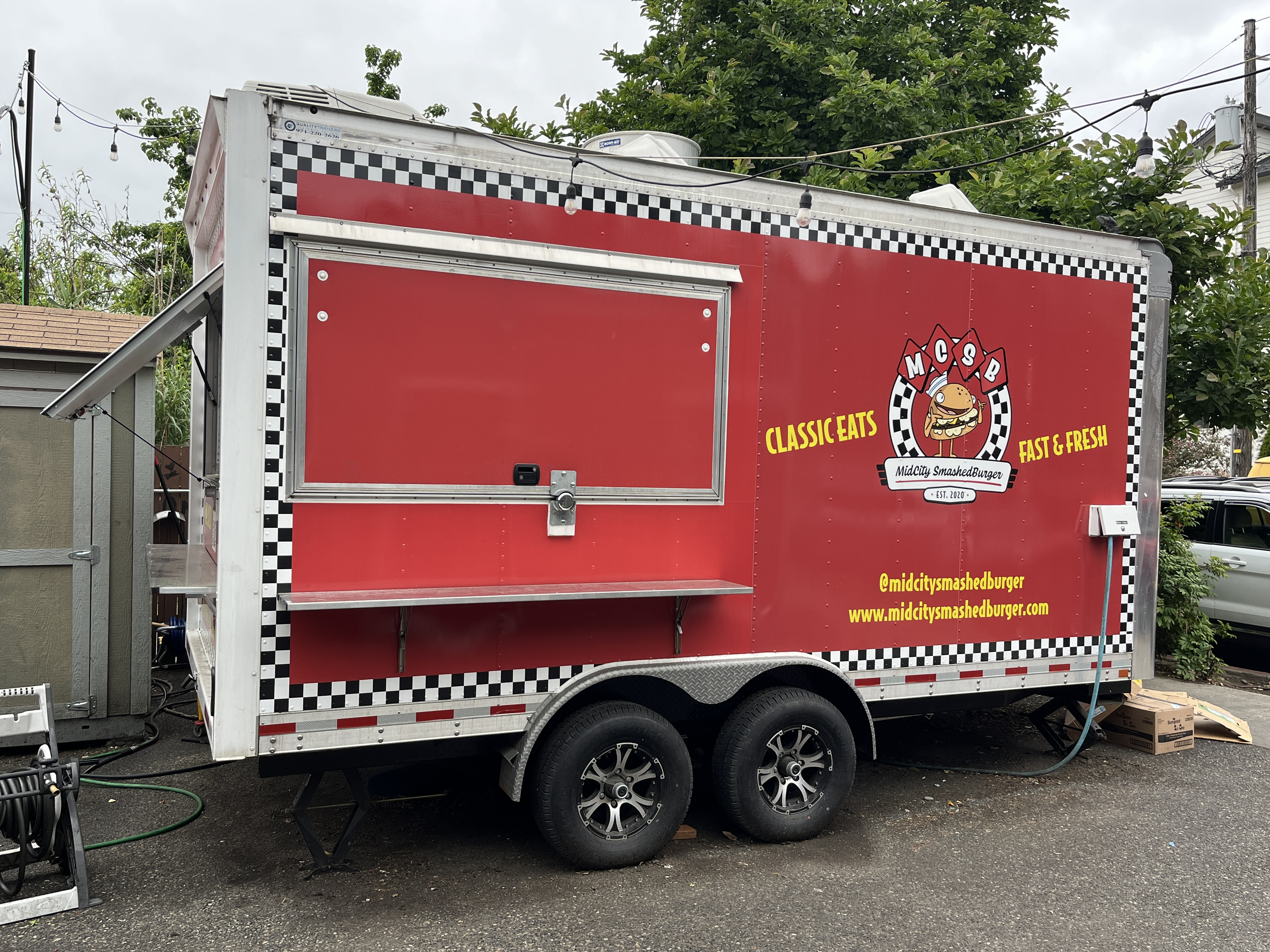
- One of the restaurant chain's food carts in Portland, Oregon, in 2025

Restaurant information
- Established: 2020
- Owner: Mike Aldridge
- Chef: Mike Aldridge
- Location: Oregon, United States
- Website: midcitysmashedburger.com

MidCity SmashedBurger (also known as MidCity SmashBurger) is a small chain of restaurants based in Portland, Oregon, United States. Chef Mike Aldridge founded the business as a pop-up restaurant in New Orleans in 2020 during the COVID-19 pandemic, then relocated and relaunched as a food cart in Portland in early 2021. MidCity specializes in smash burgers, featuring meat pressed directly on a flat-top grill. MidCity has also operated in Bend and Beaverton. The restaurant has garnered a positive reception and has been praised for serving some of the best burgers in Portland and Central Oregon.

== Description ==
MidCity SmashedBurger is a small chain of restaurants in the U.S. state of Oregon, operating in Portland and Bend, specializing in smash burgers, described by Michael Russell of The Oregonian as "burgers made from meat smashed directly on a flat-top grill". Beyond regular and vegan burgers, MidCity serves fish sandwiches, chicken nuggets, French fries, and milkshakes. The burger sauce is a blend of ingredients, including mayonnaise and mustard. One Portland location features an illustration by local artist Mike Bennett of a cheeseburger pointing finger guns. The cartoon burger, Smashy, has become MidCity's mascot.

== History ==
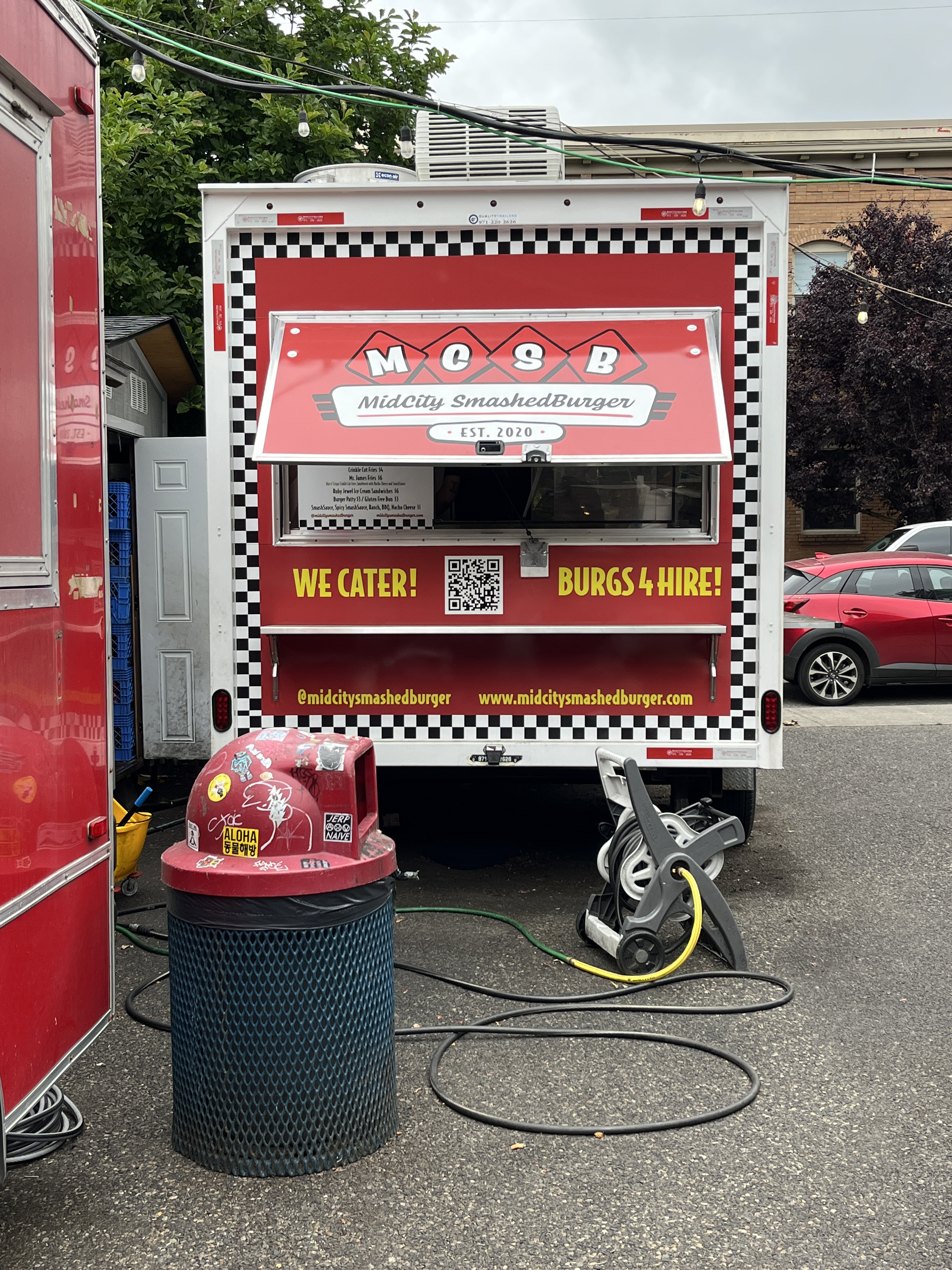
Food cart in Portland, Oregon (2025)

Chef and owner Mike Aldridge founded MidCity as a pop-up restaurant, selling burgers from his porch in New Orleans during the COVID-19 pandemic. He moved to Portland and re-opened in January 2021, operating a food truck on Stark Street at the intersection of 11th Avenue in southeast Portland's Buckman neighborhood, where he sold approximately 1,000 burgers in his first eight days. The business quickly built a social media following, selling up to 300 burgers per day. By September 2021 MidCity had sold tens of thousands of burgers.

In 2021, Brooke Jackson-Glidden of Eater Portland wrote that Aldridge hoped to open a brick and mortar location on Lombard Street in north Portland's St. Johns neighborhood, in a space that previously housed a Bernstein's Bagels shop. Restaurateur Eric Nelson (of local establishments Eem and Langbaan) collaborated with Aldridge to create a new menu featuring burgers, hot dogs, and margaritas. The St. Johns location did not materialize; instead, Aldridge opened a new food cart at a pod on North Williams Avenue near the Moda Center.

In 2022, MidCity expanded outside Portland when Aldridge opened a food cart next to the Boneyard Beer taproom on Northwest Lake Place in Bend's Old Bend neighborhood. By mid 2023, the cart had relocated to Third Street, operating outside the Waypoint Hotel's Hosmer bar, which was operated by Aldridge and his brother.

MidCity's original food cart moved in 2022. Aldridge declined the nearby space offered by food cart pod Pan y Pueblo (then known as Lil' America), relocating his cart to the Level Brewing taproom on Sandy Boulevard in the northeast Portland part of the Kerns neighborhood. In March 2024, the business announced plans to relocate a cart to Belmont. The cart opened at the Ship Ahoy Tavern in southeast Portland's Creston-Kenilworth neighborhood on March 27. MidCity also began operating at Binary Brewing in Beaverton in 2024.

== Reception ==
In 2021, Michael Russell of The Oregonian said MidCity had Portland's best smash burger. He also included the business in an overview of the city's best new food carts. Karen Brooks and Katherine Chew Hamilton included MidCity in Portland Monthly's 2021 list of the city's best new food carts. Alex Frane included the business in Thrillist's 2021 overview of "must-hit" restaurants in Portland.

In 2023, Eater Portland's Katrina Yentch lauded MidCity's affordability, and Jashayla Pettigrew included the restaurant in KOIN's list of the seven best smash burgers in the metropolitan area, based on Yelp reviews. Ron Scott and Janey Wong included the restaurant in Eater Portland's 2024 list of twenty "mind-blowing" burgers in the Portland metropolitan area. MidCity was also included in the website's 2025 list of the Portland's best affordable restaurants. Bend Magazine has also included the restaurant in its overview of the best burgers in Central Oregon.

== See also ==
- List of hamburger restaurants
- List of restaurant chains in the United States
