= OK Chicken and Khao Soi =

Thai restaurant in Portland, Oregon, U.S.

- The restaurant's exterior, 2026
- Interactive map of OK Chicken and Khao Soi

Restaurant information
- Established: January 23, 2026
- Owner: Earl Ninsom
- Head chef: Sam Smith
- Food type: Thai
- Location: 3226 Southeast Division Street, Portland, Multnomah, Oregon, 97202, United States
- Coordinates: 45°30′17″N 122°37′56″W
- Website: okchickenandkhaosoi.com

OK Chicken and Khao Soi is a Thai restaurant in Portland, Oregon, United States. Established in January 2026, it operates in southeast Portland's Richmond neighborhood, in the space that previously housed Pok Pok. OK Chicken and Khao Soi was included in The New York Times's 2026 list of the nation's 50 best restaurants.

== Description ==
OK Chicken and Khao Soi serves northern Thai cuisine on Division Street southeast Portland's Richmond neighborhood. The main dining rooms have walls with wood panelling. The restaurant also has a patio. OK Chicken and Khao Soi plays Thai pop music and sets tables with silverware in Thai Pepsi boxes.

=== Menu ===
The khao soi comes with chicken, beef, or tofu. The menu also includes fried chicken, sai oua (seasoned pork sausage), pork belly, and other grilled meats with herbs and fish sauce. Papaya salads have crab paste, pork curry, and nam phrik relishes. Desserts include salted coconut milk, longan, and coconut or tamarind ice cream. Drink options include herbal tea slushies and chamomile-infused Scotch whisky, as well as nonalcoholic juices and teas.

== History ==
OK Chicken and Khao Soi opened on January 23, 2026, operating in the space that previously housed Pok Pok. Earl Ninsom opened OK Chicken and Khao Soi with Sam Smith as head chef and Eric Nelson overseeing the bar program. Ninsom also hired multiple people who previously worked at Pok Pok.

== Reception ==
OK Chicken and Khao Soi was included in The New York Times's 2026 list of the nation's 50 best restaurants. The business was also included in The Infatuation's 2026 list of the nation's 25 best new restaurants.

== See also ==
- List of Thai restaurants
