= Ship Ahoy Tavern =

Dive bar in Portland, Oregon, U.S.

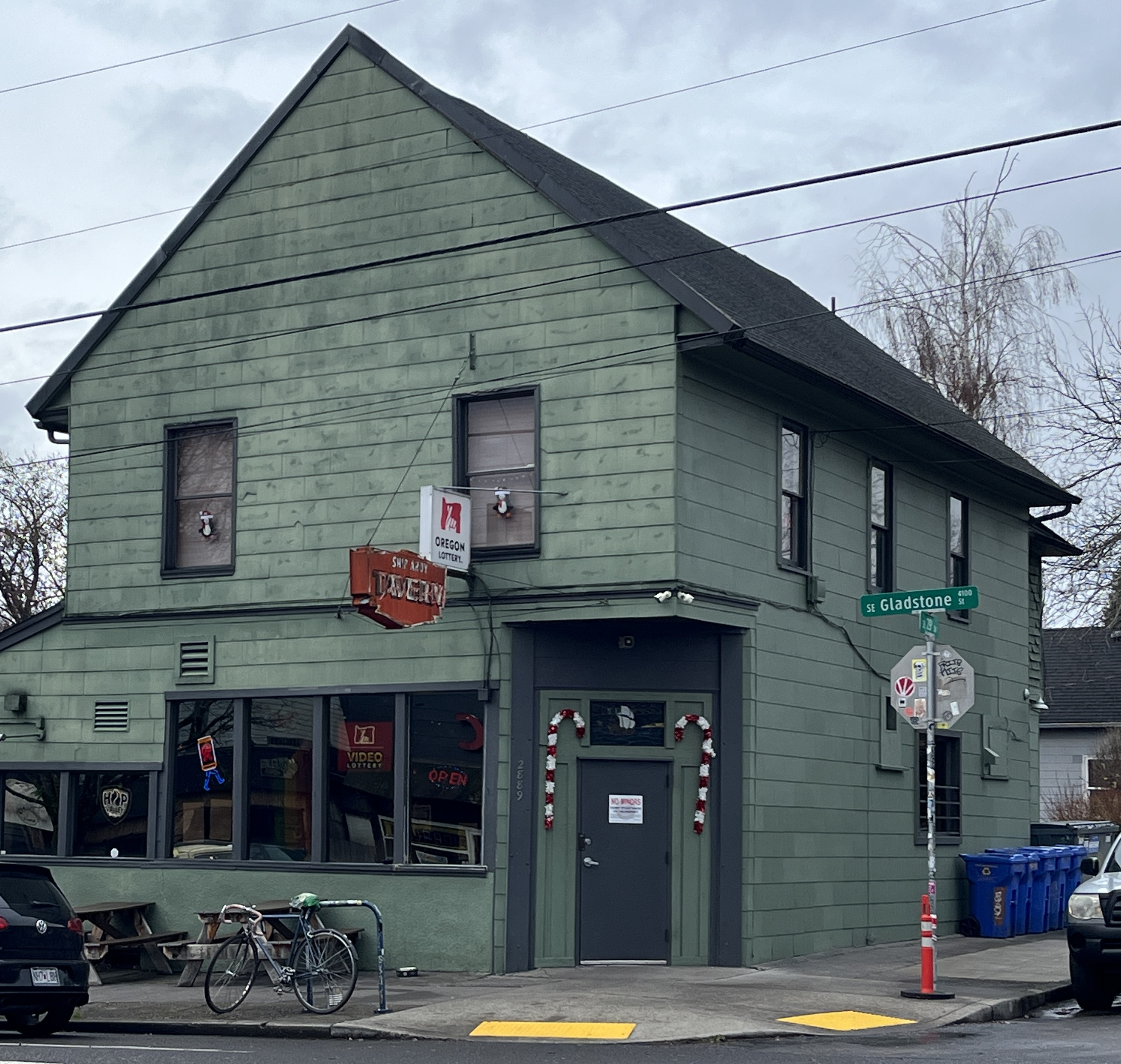
- The bar's exterior, 2024
- Interactive map of Ship Ahoy Tavern

Restaurant information
- Location: 2889 Southeast Gladstone Street, Portland, Multnomah, Oregon, 97202, United States
- Coordinates: 45.4936°N 122.6358°W

Ship Ahoy Tavern is a dive bar in Portland, Oregon, United States. It is located in southeast Portland's Creston-Kenilworth neighborhood and opened during the 1940s. The nautical-themed bar has pinball, a billiard table, and decorations like lighthouses and ship models. Ship Ahoy has hosted food carts and pop-up restaurants on-site, including MidCity SmashedBurger.

== Description ==
The nautical-themed dive bar Ship Ahoy Tavern operates on Gladstone Street in southeast Portland's Creston-Kenilworth neighborhood. It has a patio, and the interior has a card table, knicknacks, pinball, a billiard table, and multiple television screens. Decorations include lighthouses and ship models. The bar serves beer and cider, as well as snacks like pizza and pretzels. According to the Portland Mercury, patrons are allowed to bring in food from select nearby restaurants. In 2023, Willamette Week said Ship Ahoy "feels quintessentially Portland with its mix of lovable weirdos, service-industry workers enjoying their night off, neighborhood lifers and hipsters".

== History ==
The bar opened during the 1940s, and was later owned by the Moles family. Ship Ahoy has been described as a sibling establishment to My Father's Place. Ship Ahoy was burglarized in 2008. In 2023, someone crashed a U-Haul truck into the building.

=== Food carts and pop-up restaurants ===
In 2018, Ship Ahoy hosted the pop-up Wanna Fight, which Eater Portland said served "modernist-meets-Big Mac" food such as smoked mussel Jell-O shots, grits with oxtail ragu and American cheese, beet with green papaya atchara, and a ricotta custard with miso dulce de leche.

The Thai food cart Chop Chop PDX (or simply Chop Chop), which ranked fourth in The Oregonian's list of the best new food carts of 2023, operated in front of Ship Ahoy until February 2024. In March, the owner of MidCity SmashedBurger announced plans to start operaring a food cart at Ship Ahoy by the end of the month.

== Reception ==
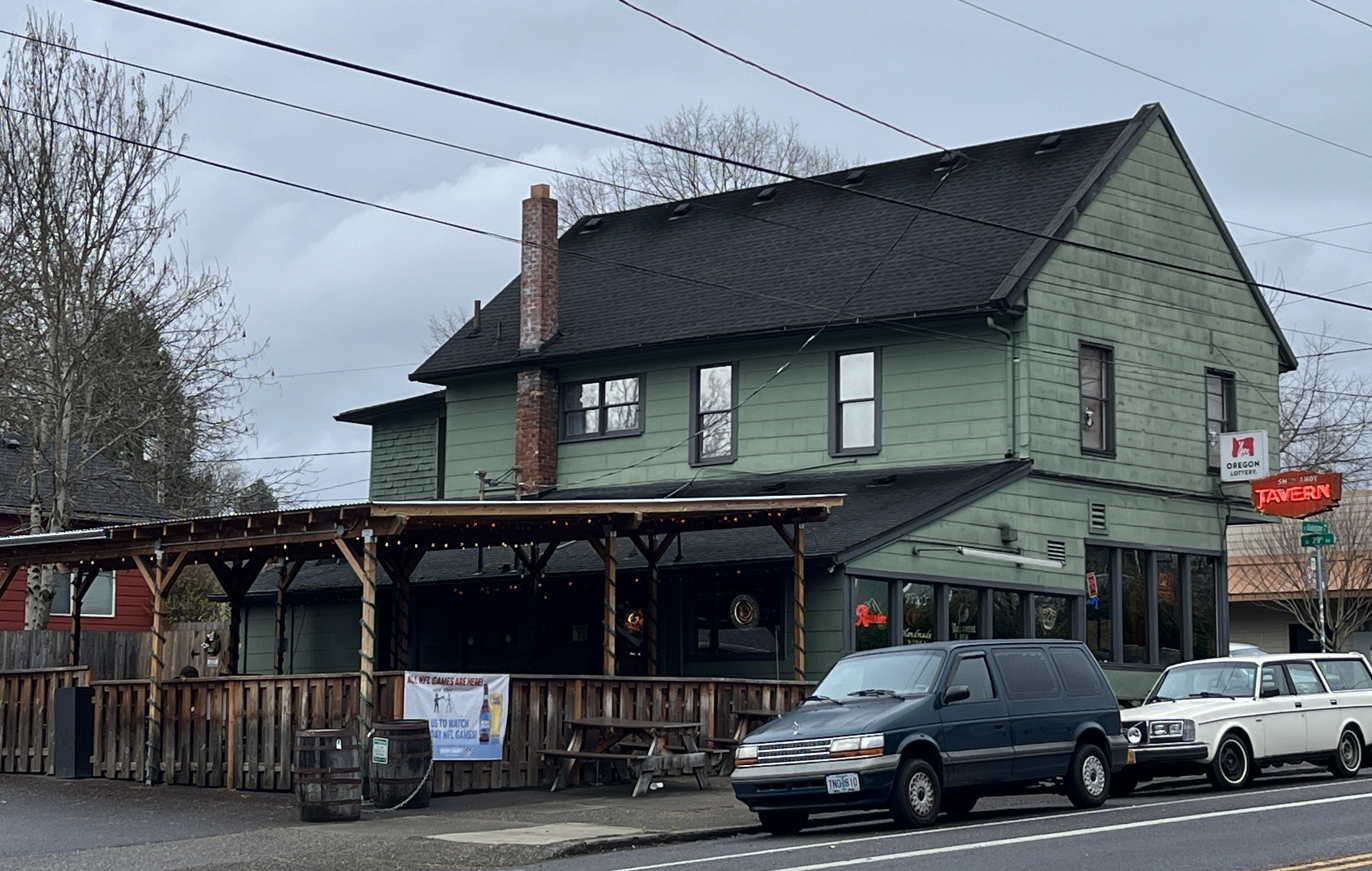
The bar's exterior in 2024

In 2004, Marjorie Skinner of the Portland Mercury said of Ship Ahoy's clientele:

This cozy, old school dive bar is a good place for Reed College kids to slum when they get bored of Putters, but 'the Ship's' main clientele are neighborhood folks, a little on the aged side. Urban legends of reckless smarminess abound, such as one friend who swears that whenever he took his girlfriends there, half-toothed gentlemen would simply sit down at their table, block him off, and take their best shot at the little lady. But when the regulars of this joint get their hands on a karaoke machine, they tear it up! A good place for people watching—just don't piss anyone off.

Ship Ahoy was among ten businesses selected for the 'Your Favorite Dive Bar' category in the Portland Mercury's 2014 readers' choice poll. In 2016, the newspaper's Joe Streckert said the bar's nautical decorations "place character without crossing over into kitsch" and called the bar "a place where living happens". He opined, "Ship Ahoy is a neighborhood place, the kind you hang out in after work on a weekday. It's not momentous or gigantic, but that's why it's good. It's the type of neighborhood bar where one can just be, whether gazing into a TV screen or standing at a pinball machine."

Drew Tyson included Ship Ahoy in Thrillist's 2014 "definitive guide" to Jell-O shots in Portland. Pete Cottell selected the business for the Gladstone neighborhood in the website's 2015 list of the best dive bars in 25 of Portland's neighborhoods. He said the bar offers "an excellent patio, above-average tots, and a solid selection of pinball machines, and Ship Ahoy is exactly what the doctor ordered for a no-bullshit Friday night. Or Sunday morning. There's always room for jello." Matthew Korfhage included Ship Shoy in Willamette Week's 2016 overview of Portland's "biggest PBR bars" and wrote, "When you order PBR at south-of-Powell dive bar Ship Ahoy, you have to be specific. 'Bottle, draft or can?'"

Heather Arndt Anderson recommended Ship Ahoy in Eater Portland's 2017 overview of "where to eat and drink like a pirate", or nautical-themed restaurants, in the city. In the website's 2024 "ultimate guide" to Portland's "iconic" dive bars, Ben Coleman said Ship Ahoy "has the battered charm of a reliable old trawler that doesn't know how to sink". He opined, "Food is of the 'we can heat up a Totino's for you but we'd rather not' school, but if grog is what you're after and Gladstone is what you're on, the Ship Ahoy can oblige."

== See also ==
- List of dive bars
