= My Father's Place (Portland, Oregon) =

Bar and restaurant in Portland, Oregon, U.S.

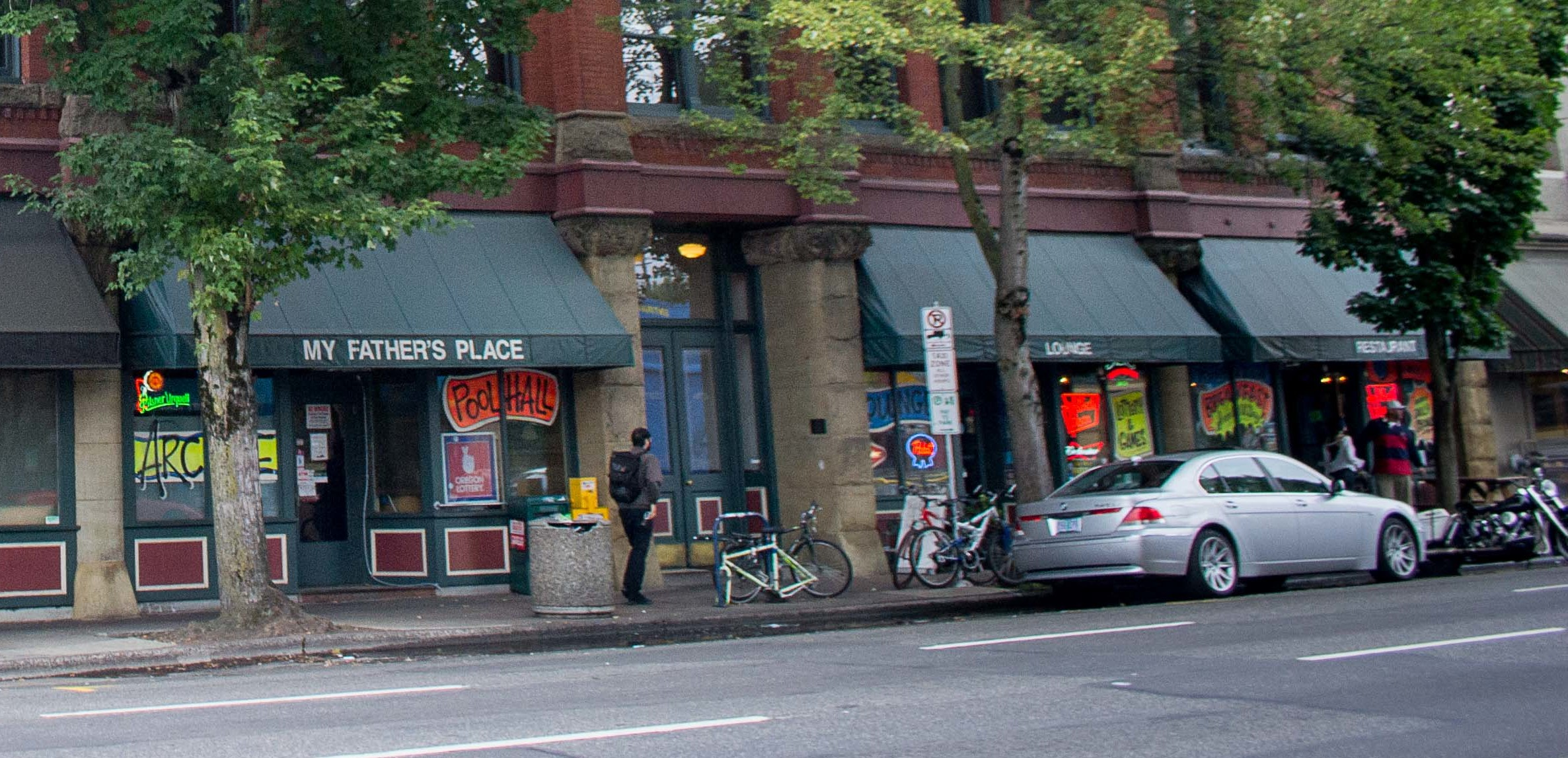
- The bar and restaurant's exterior in 2013
- Interactive map of My Father's Place

Restaurant information
- Established: 1978
- Owners: Linda Moles; Darrell Moles; Kasey Moles
- Previous owner: Merrie Ann Dillon
- Food type: American
- Location: 523 Southeast Grand Avenue, Portland, Multnomah, Oregon, 97214, United States
- Coordinates: 45.5188°N 122.6609°W
- Website: myfathersplacepdx.com

My Father's Place is a restaurant and dive bar in the Buckman neighborhood of Portland, Oregon. Housed in the New Logus Block, a building complex completed in 1872, included on the National Register of Historic Places, the diner has a game room and lounge and attracts a diverse clientele. The restaurant opened in 1978, and was later owned by Merrie Ann Dillon, who sold the business to her daughter Linda Moles in 2002. Remaining under the ownership of the Moles family, My Father's Place serves breakfast all day and offers happy hour options. The game room and lounge have pool tables, lottery machines, pinball, and a jukebox. Musicians Elliott Smith and Willy Vlautin frequented the bar, which hosts game nights and other events. Known as a local favorite, it operates every day including holidays, Thanksgiving and Christmas. The reportedly haunted My Father's Place has received a generally positive reception.

== Description ==
My Father's Place is a dive bar and restaurant in the New Logus Block, a building complex completed in 1892, included on the National Register of Historic Places, in southeast Portland's Buckman neighborhood. Eater Portland's Michelle DeVona described My Father's Place as an "old-school" diner with a bar, game room, and lounge, calling the bar a "quirky Portland watering hole" and the "diviest of dives". Thrillist describes My Father's Place as a "classic, old-school" dive bar with large booths and comfort food. In his book Unique Eats and Eateries of Portland, Oregon (2018), Adam Sawyer called My Father's Place an "old-school diner, knick-knack treasure trove, lounge, and game room". The bar and restaurant had operated from 6:00 am–2:30 am, every day, since the late 1970s.

Until 10:00 pm, minors are allowed in the bar part of My Father's Place, which hosts events such as comedy shows and game night on Wednesdays, as of 2016. In 2019, Willamette Week said My Father's Place is known for operating on holidays and serving as a "refuge to those either without the means or the desire to spend the holidays at their actual father's place".

DeVona stated My Father's Place caters to people of all walks of life, from "artists, straight-laced professionals, laypersons, vagrants, and other miscreants". The diner "welcomes a wide swath of well-wishers throughout the day", according to Willamette Week, which said "first call attracts an especially diverse scrum for unofficial sunrise service, split evenly between retirees seeking eye-openers and drinkers still awake from the night before". The Oregonian's Grant Butler said the bar is popular with "graveyard shift workers in the morning" and "rabble-rousers late at night". Sawyer noted the diversity of guests, describing them as "truckers, punks, transients and transplants, the curious and constant, poets, businessmen, couples and families". He wrote, "The clientele at 6 a.m., when the restaurant opens, are just as likely to be ending their day as beginning it. Vice versa when they close at 2 a.m."

=== Interior ===
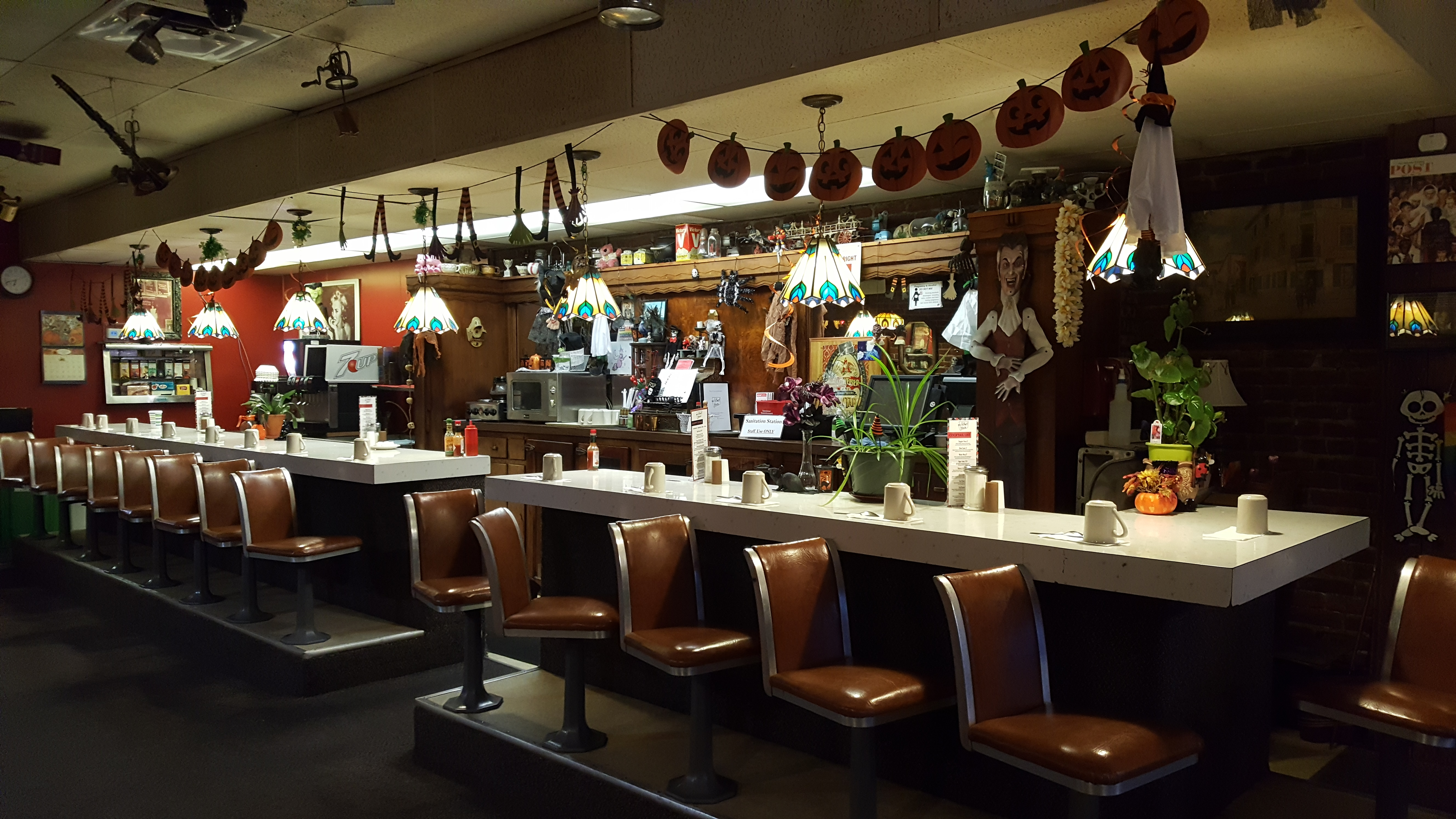
Interior counter, 2021

The interior has "well-worn" booths, exposed brick walls, "vintage" ceiling lamps, a jukebox, and an "eclectic" collection of knickknacks. There are black-and-white photographs on the walls, a glass cabinet with antique liquor bottles, and a vending machine stocked with cigarettes, despite being a non-smoking establishment. Portraits depict John F. Kennedy, Abraham Lincoln, and Franklin D. Roosevelt, among others. In 2015, DeVona said, "Even on bright sunny days, the dark choice of coloring for the interior, coupled with modest lighting, give off a dusky ambiance."

There is also a room with pool tables, lottery machines, and pinball. Amoris Walker of Serious Eats noted the "giant collection of pretty much every board game that has ever existed" and wrote, "Antique knick-knacks and crusty old toys dangle precariously above your head: If a 1950s diner, a midwestern truck stop, and an antique store were to have a baby, it would look like this dive bar." In 2008, Anne Marie DiStefano of the Portland Tribune described an artificial Christmas tree on continual display for years, with ornaments for different holidays including flags for Independence Day and ghosts or jack-o'-lanterns for Halloween.

=== Menu ===
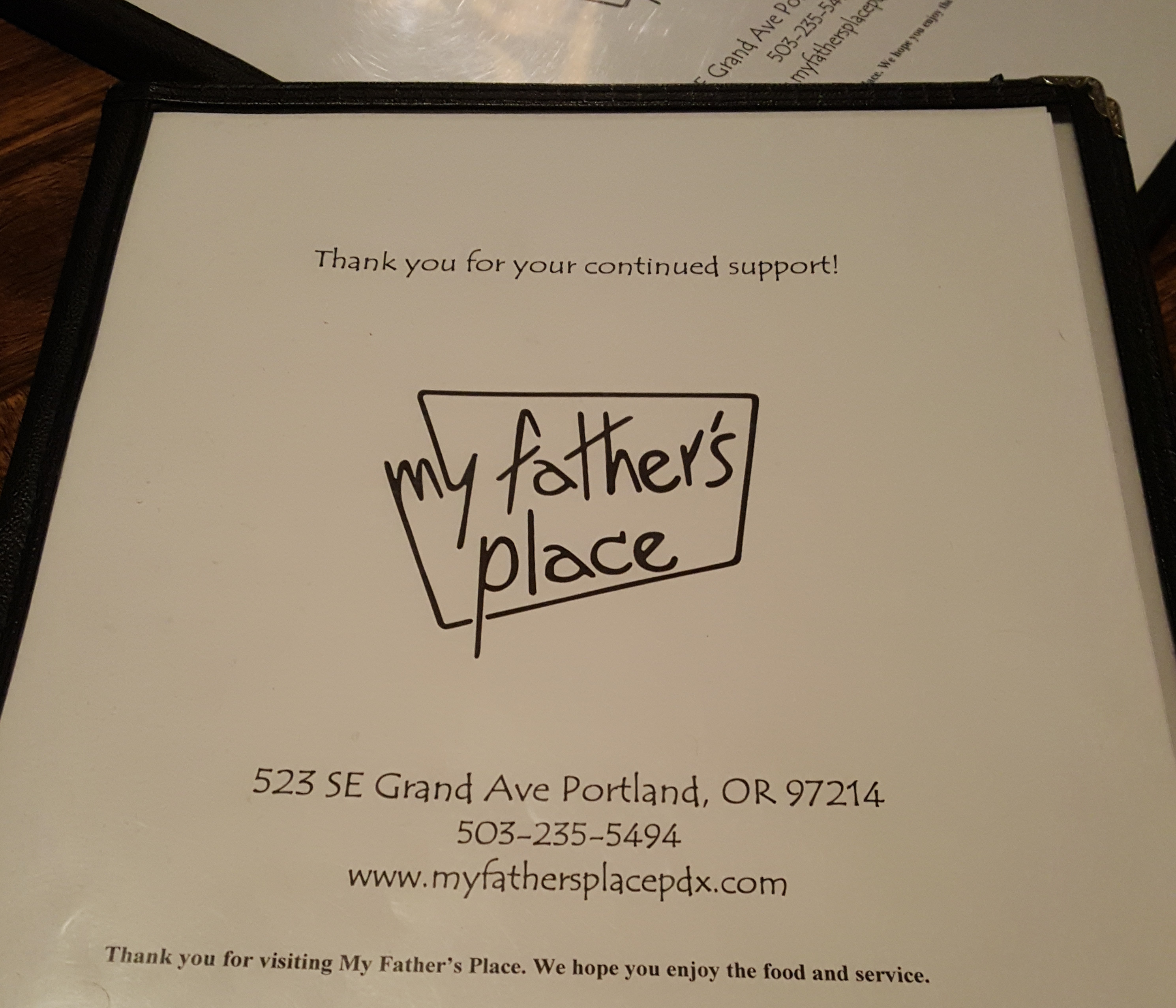
Menu

My Father's Place serves breakfast all day. Menu options include bacon, biscuits and gravy, chicken fried steak, eggs (including Eggs Benedict), french fries, hash browns, onion rings, pancakes, sandwiches, sausage, sliders (chicken and pulled pork), quesadillas, and toast. The drink menu includes Bloody Marys with bacon, black pepper, cilantro, garlic, or habanero, as well as Spanish coffee and beer. As of 2017, beer options include Hamm's Brewery, Olympia Brewing Company, Pabst Blue Ribbon, and Rainier Brewing Company. The Jay Horton, named after a local freelance writer, includes coffee with well whisky, topped with whipped cream. In 2008, DiStefano described a special Christmas dinner special with ham, mashed potatoes, stuffing, candied sweet potato, vegetables, and a bread roll. The diner's Thanksgiving special in 2017 included ham or turkey with mashed potatoes and gravy, green beans, salad or soup, dinner rolls, and cheesecake.

== History ==
My Father's Place opened in 1978. Merrie Ann Dillon began working as a waitress at the bar, before becoming a co-owner then sole proprietor. In 2002, she sold the business to her daughter Linda Moles. Moles' sons Darrell and Kasey grew up around the bar and later worked there while Moles continued waitressing. My Father's Place remains family-owned. Ship Ahoy Tavern has been described as a sibling establishment.

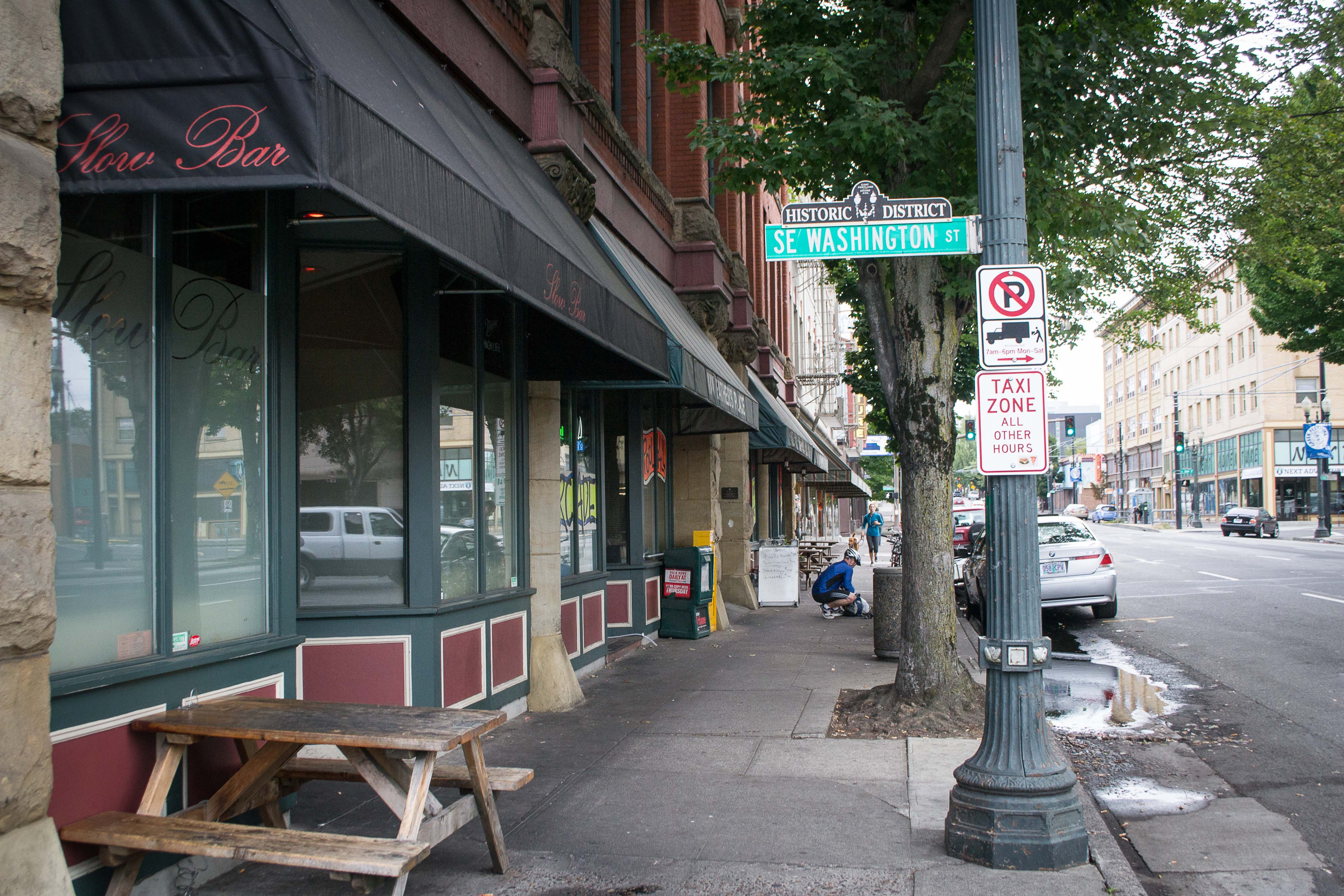
The sidewalk outside My Father's Place and neighboring Slow Bar in 2013

My Father's Place had approximately 25 employees, as of 2018. Sawyer called them "an extension of the family" and noted the high employee retention, with half having worked at the bar for at least five years. He said My Father's Place was "more or less unchanged from the day it opened in 1978" and "a place for everybody". Sawyer complimented family's other bars but said "there is only one true dive-bar melting pot, and it's My Father's Place". Darrell Moles has said, "All ages, races, genders, sexual orientations, political views, sharing the same space, food, and drink. It has always been that way there." Musicians Elliott Smith and Willy Vlautin frequented the bar, which Butler said has "long been a favorite with local musicians".

In 2016, Eater Portland included My Father's Place in an article called "Ghost Stories from Portland's 5 Most Haunted Restaurants" and said, "Some occurrences reported by employees are paper towel dispensers rolling without aid and a man's voice sometimes heard early in the morning." The website quoted Linda Moles as saying "some individuals never leave" and shared a bartender recalling a sign, which had served as a memorial to a former bartender, Bud, falling when some of Bud's favorite songs by the Beatles played on the jukebox. Eater Portland said, "Moles maintains that it's a positive presence rather than a haunting and sees it as a friendly reminder that our loved ones are still with us — in spirit, of course."

My Father's Place hosted shows as part of the Bridgetown Comedy Festival in 2016. During the COVID-19 pandemic, bar seating was restricted and staff assistance was required for the jukebox and pinball machines, as of September 2020.

== Reception ==
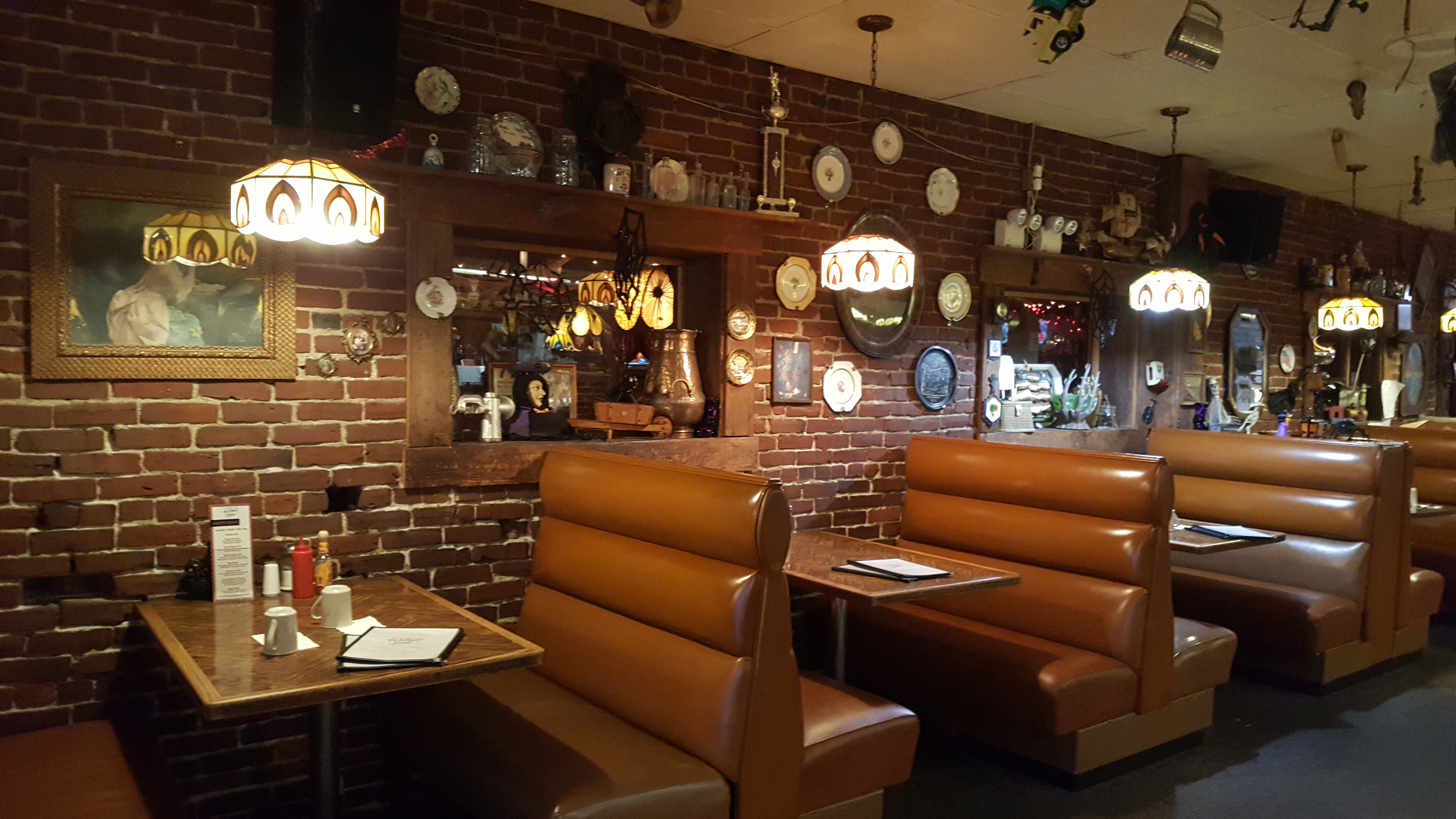
Interior booths, 2021

In her article about My Father's Place during Christmas, DiStefano wrote, "I've been here on Thanksgiving before, and once on Easter. I don't find it the least bit depressing to spend a holiday this way, although there are people out there who will absolutely refuse to believe me." In Serious Eats' 2013 list of the city's best dive bars, Walker called My Father's Place "a locals' favorite". In 2015, DeVona described the bar as Portland's "quirkiest home away from home" and called the dark interior "oddly comforting". She opined, "it's perfectly normal to see someone who personifies, say, the Ziggy Stardust-era Bowie sitting alongside a slick-suited business type at the bar. Or for families to have their weekend breakfast amidst a nest of revelers nursing hangovers. The fact that people from all stations in life can congregate here without any bearing of judgment makes My Father's Place a unique entity among the plethora of trendy spots now joining the neighborhood."

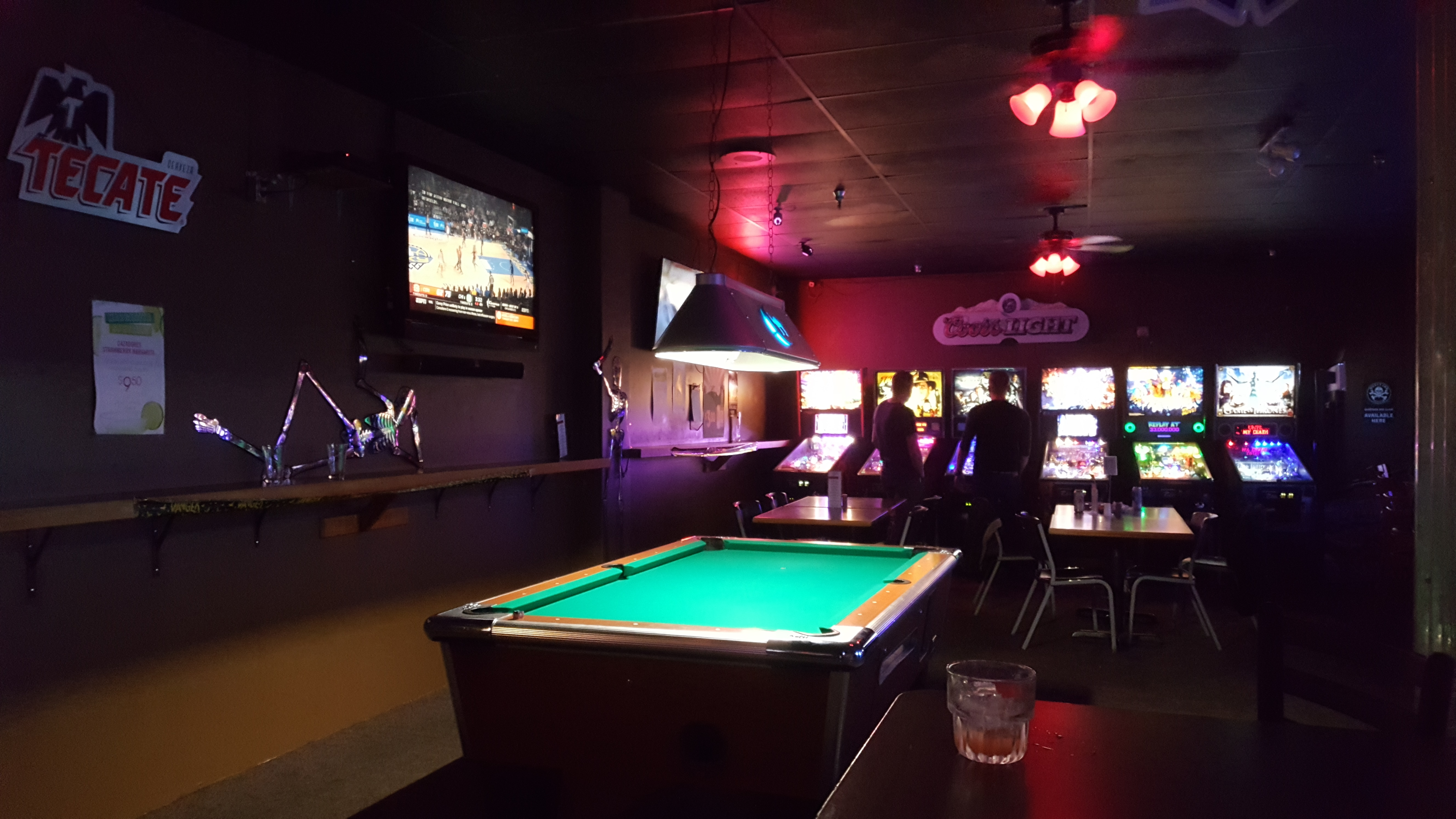
Pool table and pinball machines

In 2016, the Portland Mercury's Suzette Smith called the food "cheap" and "fine". In her 2017 overview of Portland's dive bar brunches, Ciara Dolan called My Father's Place "one of Portland's premiere dive bars" with "greasy, buttery, and affordable" food and a "surprisingly family friendly" atmosphere for weekend brunch. She wrote, "The coffee is endearingly subpar—this is not for the Stumptown crowd. But between the rich, bright-yellow hollandaise of the eggs benedict, the crunchy goodness of the hash browns, and the reliable comfort of a short stack of pancakes, My Father's Place is exactly where you want to be for an old-fashioned, no-frills brunch." Leonie Cooper of NME included the bar in a 2018 guide of the city and said, "If you want some resolutely no frills drinking then head to My Father's Place." Cooper said the bar has "strong 'nan's living room' vibes" and was "perfect for all night benders or early rising boozehounds". Eater Portland's Alex Frank included the bar in his 2019 list of 14 "spots to day-drink" and wrote, "There's not a lot of natural light through the windows, papered with signs and posters as they are, so drinkers getting started early should be wary when leaving or risk being blinded by the fact that yes, it's still the middle of the day." Portland Monthly called the drinks "stiff" and the waiting staff friendly, and Thrillist said the diner's comfort food will "keep you coming back night after night. And if that doesn't do the trick, good booze and good company will." Thrillist's Pete Cottell included My Father's Place in his 2019 list of "the most fun" bars operating on Christmas.

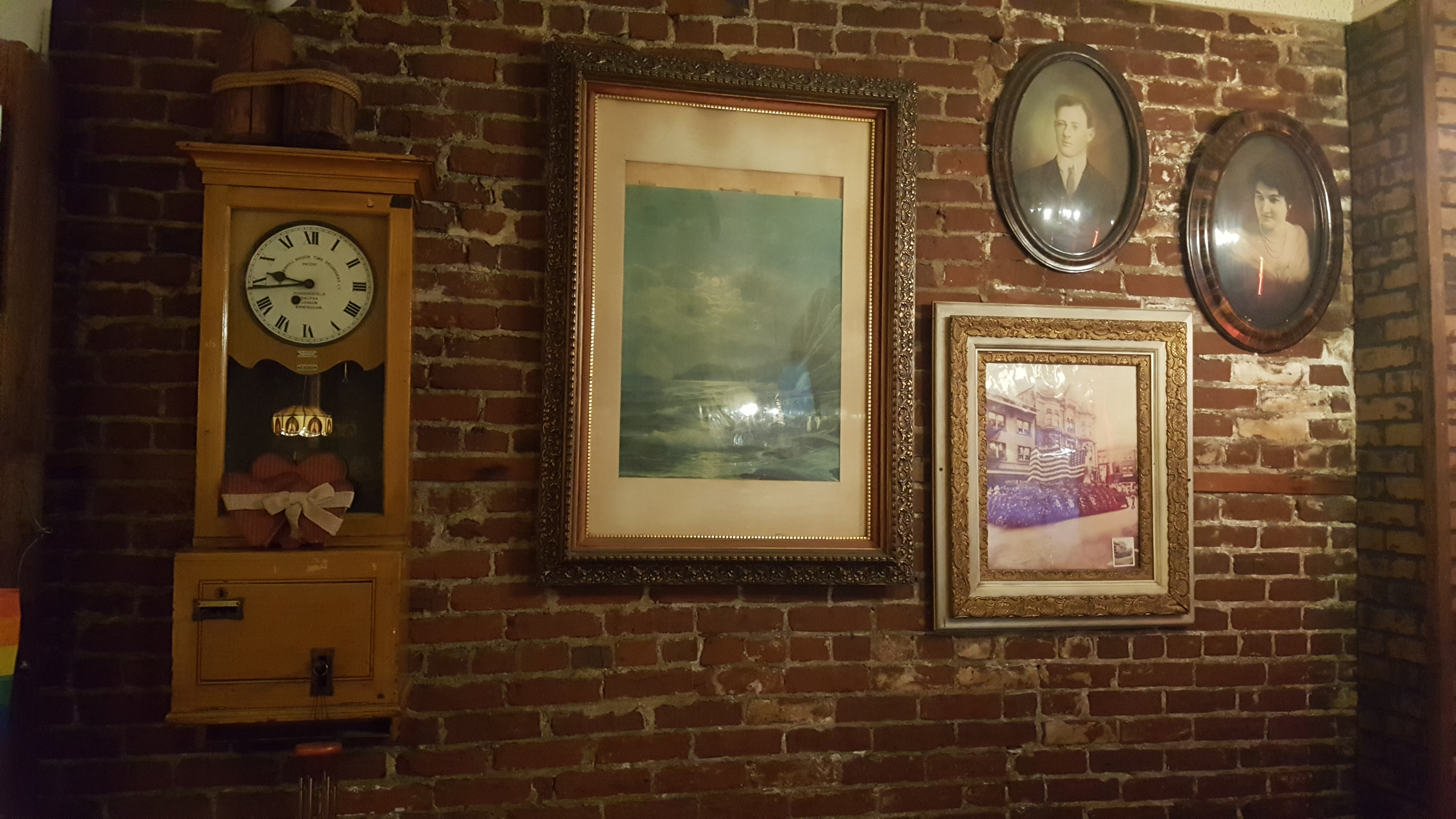
Exposed brick wall and decor

Willamette Week's 2016 overview of the best happy hours in southeast Portland described My Father's Place as the Central Eastside's "dive bar of record", and Matthew Korfhage included the bar in lists of places with cheap beer and late night happy hours. Cottell included My Father's Place in the newspaper's list of the city's 10 "best scumbag breakfasts", in which he called the bar "legendary" and "Old Portland's platonic idea of pre-noon power drinking", with a Serpico vibe and "surly old-schoolers occupying both sides of the bar at the oddest hours". He called the breakfast special "OK at best". Willamette Week's 2018 inner eastside bar crawl guide said, "With surly, take-no-shit service and an unbeatable breakfast menu that's always available, this dive diner is definitely the kind of place your dad would go when the oppressive preciousness of Portland gets to be too much." The newspaper has also included the bar in lists of the "top five places to drink" on Thanksgiving and Christmas. In 2018, Matthew Singer wrote, "If you've never started the holiday sharing a pre-dawn shot with the other lonely lushes using the eastside's homiest dive as a surrogate for their actual father's place, have you ever really spent Christmas in Portland? No, you have not." In 2019, the newspaper said, "You're really not a Portlander until you've spent a bleary Thanksgiving in this classic dive, playing board games with a bunch of strangers." My Father's Place ranked second in the Best Late-Night Eats category of Willamette Week's annual 'Best of Portland' readers' poll in 2024.

== See also ==
- List of diners
- List of dive bars
- National Register of Historic Places listings in Southeast Portland, Oregon
- Reportedly haunted locations in Oregon
