= Slow Bar =

Bar and restaurant in Portland, Oregon, U.S.

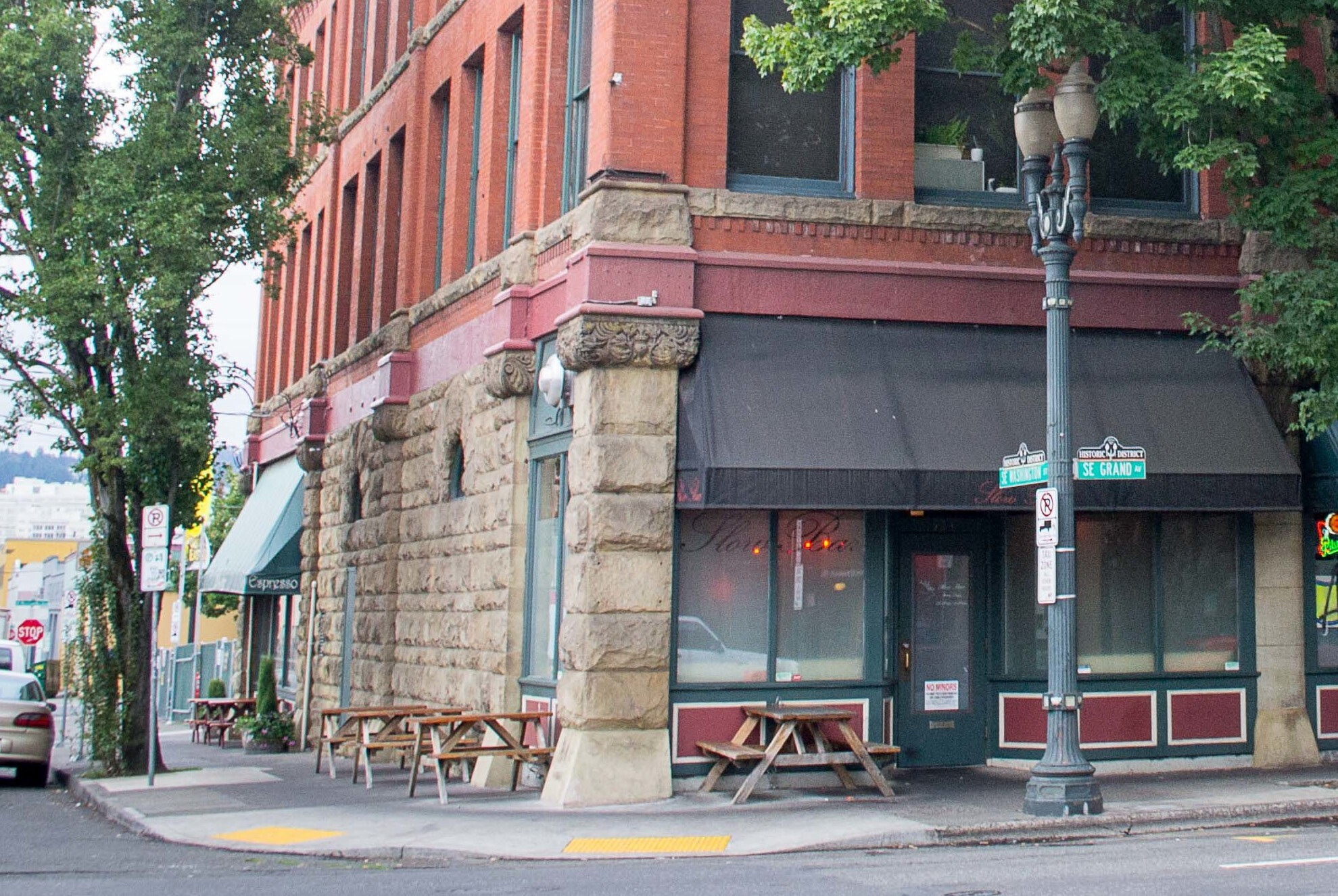
- The bar's exterior, 2013
- Interactive map of Slow Bar

Restaurant information
- Location: 533 Southeast Grand Avenue, Portland, Multnomah, Oregon, 97214, United States
- Coordinates: 45.5188°N 122.6610°W
- Website: slowbar.net

Slow Bar is a bar and restaurant in Portland, Oregon, United States. It has operated in southeast Portland's Buckman neighborhood since 2004. The bar is known for its onion ring burger. It was slated to close permanently in August 2025, but was re-opened under new ownership.

== Description ==
The bar and restaurant Slow Bar operates in the New Logus Block on Grand Avenue in southeast Portland's Buckman neighborhood.

The menu has included burgers, ceviche, fondue, pizzas, salads, and sliders. Seafood options include buttermilk fried chicken and hushpuppies. The restaurant has also served French fries and a vegan burger. Margaritas are on the drink menu.

== History ==
Slow Bar opened in July 2004.

In July 2025, the business announced plans to close permanently on August 9, operating for approximately 21 years. The general manager cited multiple reasons for the closure. The bar closed temporarily before re-opening under new ownership later in the year.

== Reception ==
Thrillist included the Slowburger in a 2016 list of the eleven best burgers in Portland. Michael Russell included the bar in The Oregonian's 2016 list of the city's 27 best eateries after 10pm.
