= New Logus Block =

Historic building in Portland, Oregon, U.S.

- U.S. National Register of Historic Places
- U.S. Historic district – Contributing property
- Portland Historic Landmark
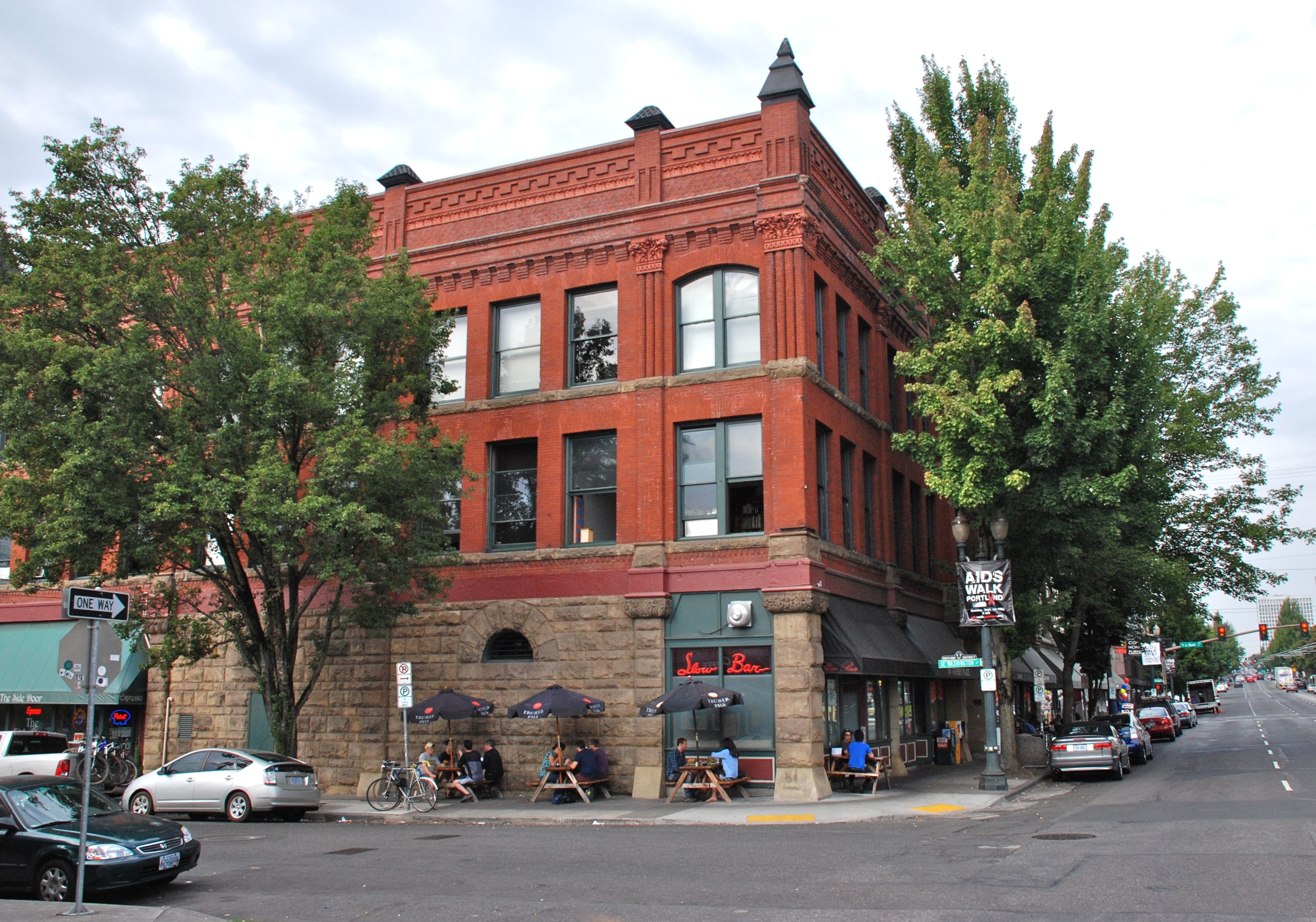
- The building's exterior in 2012

- Location within Portland, Oregon Location within Oregon Location within the United States
- Location: 523–535 SE Grand Avenue; Portland, Oregon
- Coordinates: 45°31′08″N 122°39′40″W
- Area: 0.2 acres (0.081 ha)
- Built: 1892
- Architectural style: Romanesque, Richardsonian Romanesque
- Part of: East Portland Grand Avenue Historic District (ID91000126)
- NRHP reference No.: 80003371
- Added to NRHP: February 1, 1980

The New Logus Block is a building complex in southeast Portland, Oregon, listed on the National Register of Historic Places.

== See also ==
- My Father's Place (Portland, Oregon)
- National Register of Historic Places listings in Southeast Portland, Oregon
- Slow Bar
