= PaaDee =

Thai restaurant in Portland, Oregon, U.S.

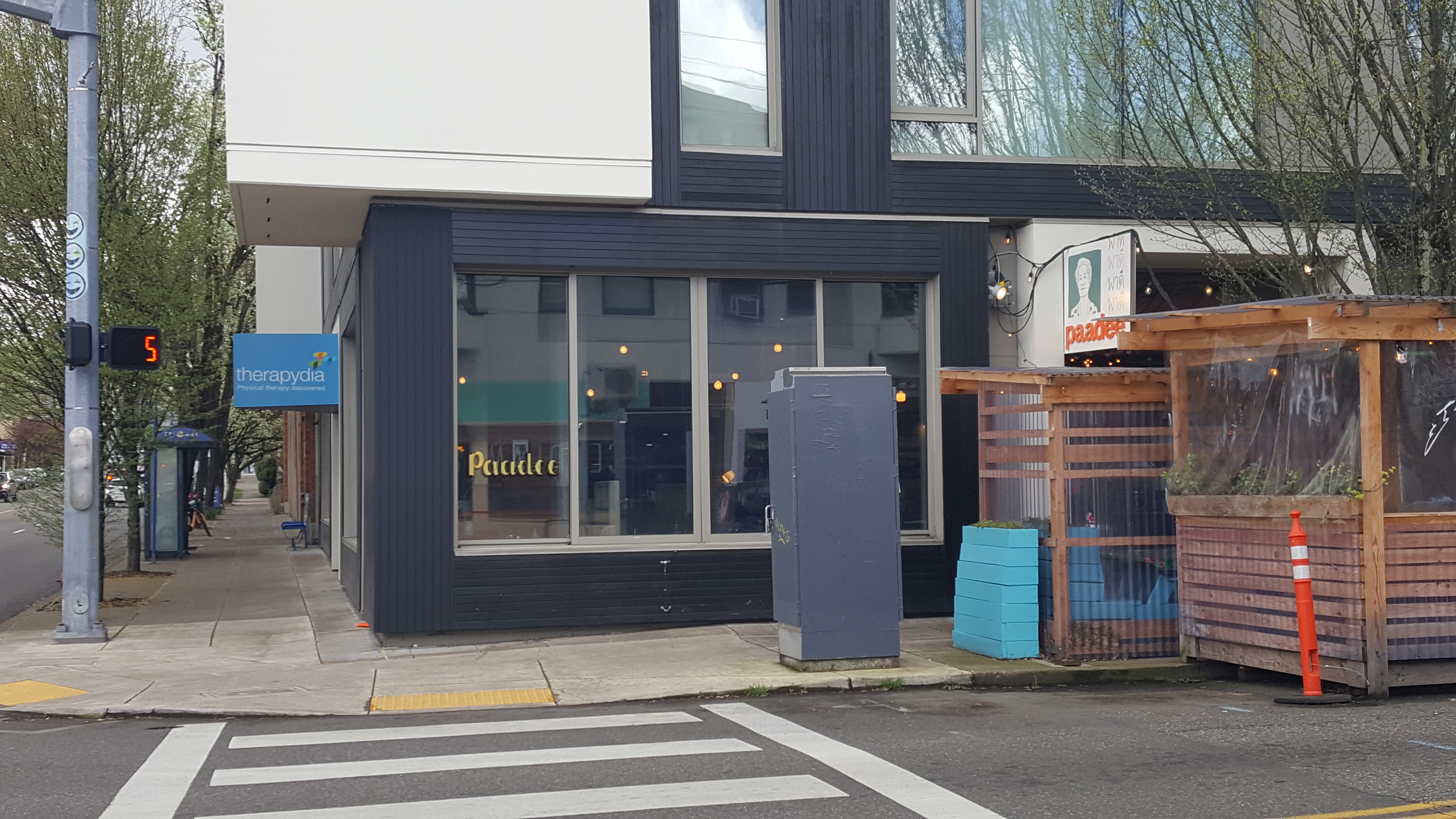
- The restaurant's exterior in 2022
- Interactive map of PaaDee

Restaurant information
- Established: November 2011
- Owner: Earl Ninsom
- Chef: Amporn Khayanha
- Food type: Thai
- Location: 6 Southeast 28th Avenue, Portland, Multnomah, Oregon, 97214, United States
- Coordinates: 45°31′21.8″N 122°38′13.7″W
- Website: paadeepdx.com

PaaDee (or Paadee) is a Thai restaurant in Portland, Oregon, United States.

== Description ==
PaaDee is a Thai restaurant on East Burnside Street in the southeast Portland part of the Kerns neighborhood. Erin DeJesus of Eater Portland has described the menu as Thai comfort food, including noodle bowls and soups, grilled steak, pork belly, skewers, kai jiew muu sub, (Thai-style omelette), sai grog e-san (fried Northern Thai fermented rice and pork sausage), and tod mon pla (fried fish cakes with cucumber relish). The Ba Mhee Pitsanulok is an egg noodle soup with pork belly, red pork, and pork meatballs in pork broth. Brunch options include egg custard, crab congee, buttermilk pancakes with sausage and fish sauce, and "street-style" omelettes.

== History ==
In early 2011, Earl Ninsom and partners announced plans to open the restaurant. PaaDee was under construction, as of September. The restaurant opened on November 12, and added weekend brunch service in December. PaaDee's first anniversary party saw some proceeds benefit the Oregon Humane Society. Amporn Khayanha served as chef, as of 2013.

PaaDee closed temporarily in 2014, during construction of Langbaan, a 24-seat Thai restaurant which opened in March 2014. For Eater's Burger Week in 2015, PaaDee served a limited number of fried chicken sandwiches with coconut cream and red curry sauce, butter lettuce, pickled vegetables, and cilantro, served on bread made by Grand Central Bakery. The restaurant was burglarized in early 2021.

== Reception ==
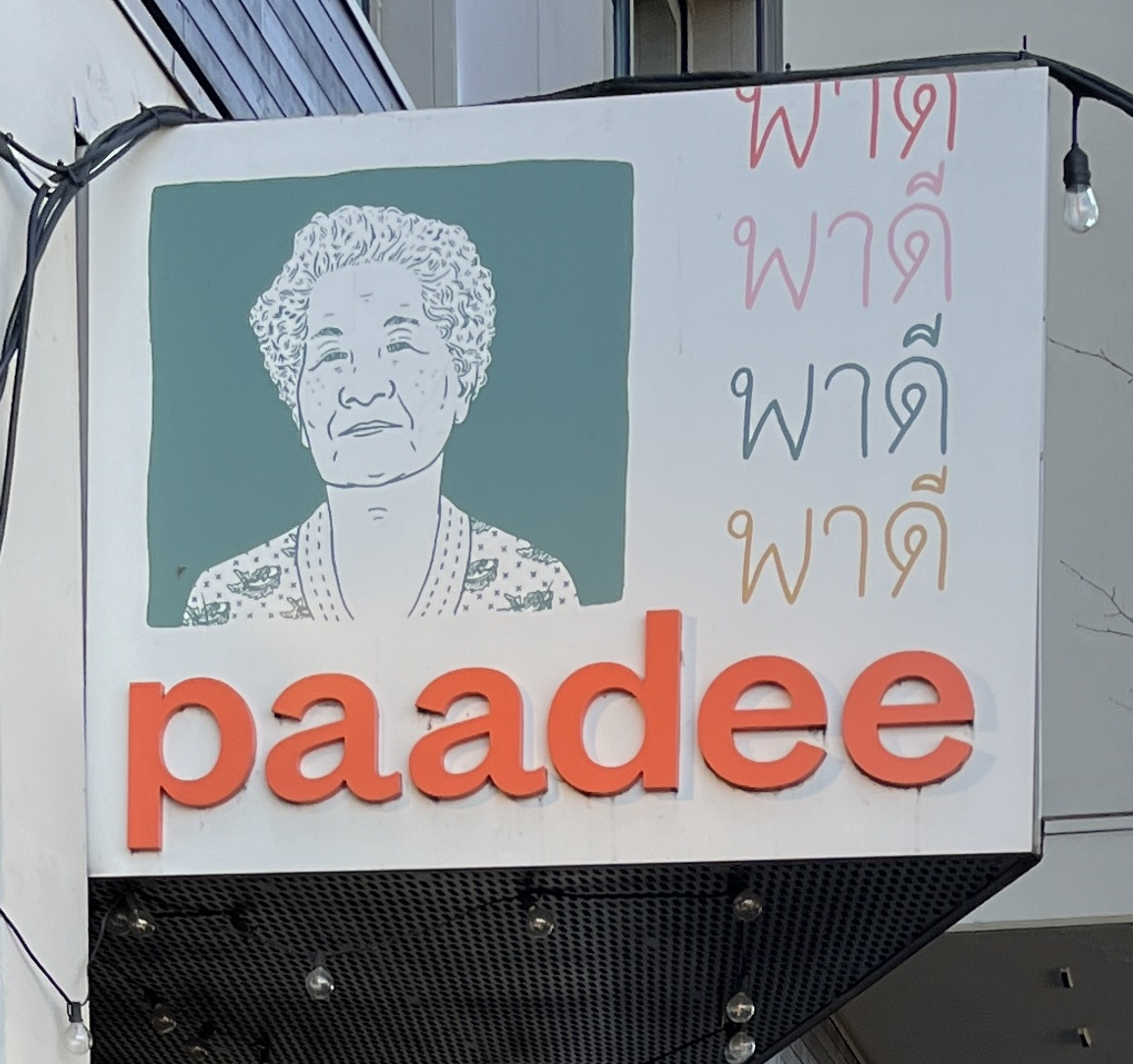
Sign for the restaurant, 2025

Nick Woo included PaaDee in Eater Portland's 2018 overview of "where to eat, drink, and relax on East 28th's underrated restaurant row". He also included the restaurant's Ba Mhee Pitsanulok in a 2018 list of 13 "soul-soothing" noodle soups in the city. In his 2018 overview of Portland’s "incredible" Southeast Asian restaurants, Woo wrote:

Often overshadowed by its fine-dining sibling Langbaan, the casual PaaDee holds its own with an Issan menu flush with tasty larb (do not miss the fluffy, omelet larb with crispy rice that’s full of citrus and mint). Whole salt-grilled rockfish is a stunner, as is the ba mhee pitsanulok, an egg noodle and pork broth soup featuring pork belly, red pork, and pork meatballs. The fun, fruity cocktails are a good match for some of the aggressively spicy dishes.

The website's Brooke Jackson-Glidden included the Tum and Laab in a 2020 list of "Healthy Portland Restaurant Plates That Don't Feel Like a Bummer". In 2021, Alex Frane and Michelle Lopez included PaaDee and Langbann in Eater Portland's list of "15 Portland Bars and Restaurants Slinging Boozy Slushies This Summer", in which they wrote: "In addition to enjoying some of the best Thai food in Portland, Paadee and Langbaan offer two delicious slushie drinks on its shared patio: the Langbaan Margarita — a bright blue frozen margarita made with curacao, lime leaf, lemongrass, and Thai chili — and the Paadee-Colada, a Thai twist on the piña colada with ingredients like soju and lime-leaf-infused coconut milk."

PaaDee ranked second in the Best Thai Restaurant category of Willamette Week's annual 'Best of Portland' readers' poll in 2022, 2024, and 2025.

== See also ==
- List of Thai restaurants
