= Lazy Susan (restaurant) =

Restaurant in Oregon, US, 2020–2023

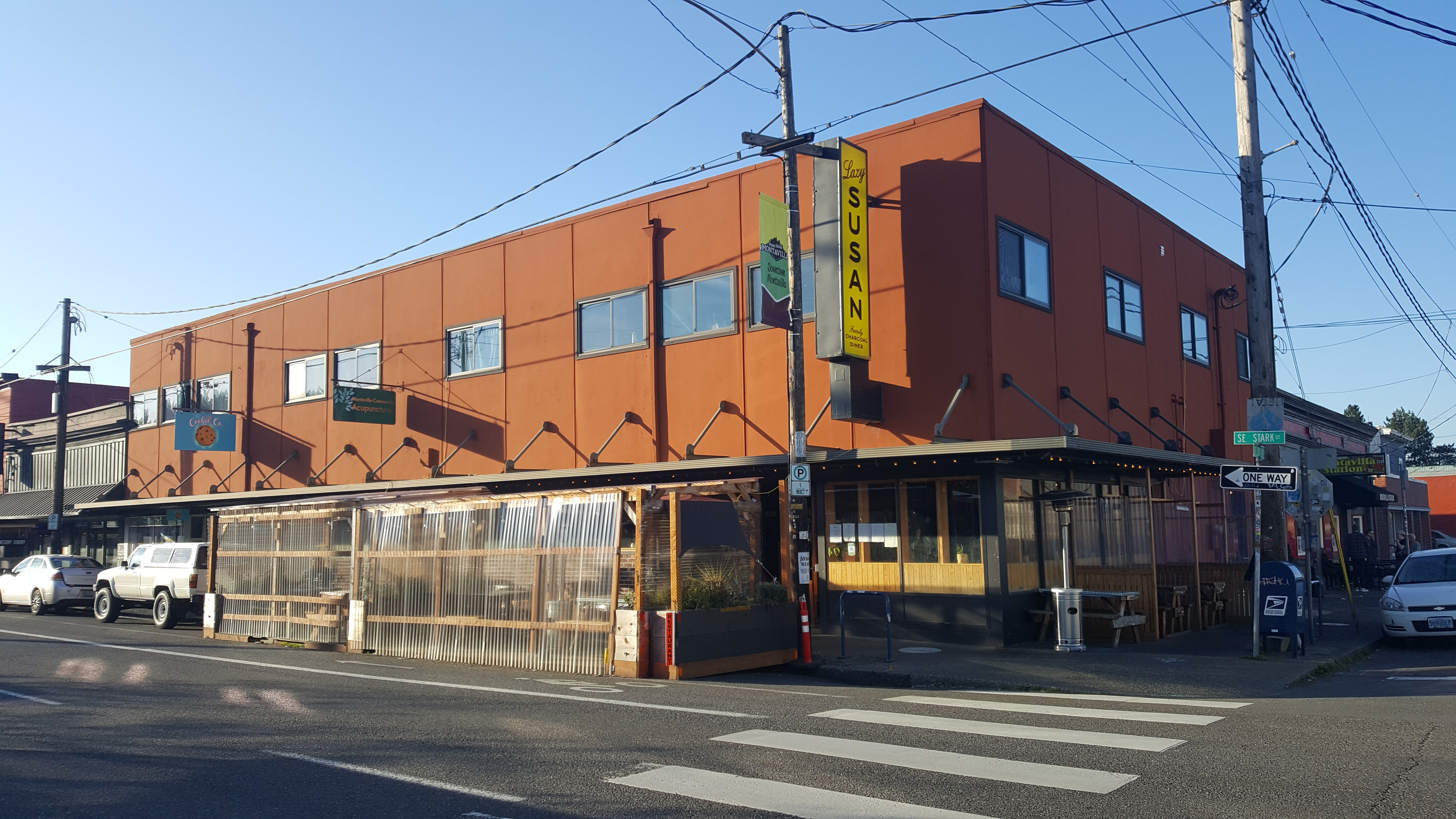
- The restaurant's exterior in 2022
- Interactive map of Lazy Susan

Restaurant information
- Established: March 2020
- Closed: July 23, 2023
- Food type: New American
- Location: 7937 Southeast Stark Street, Portland, Multnomah, Oregon, 97215, United States
- Coordinates: 45.5193°N 122.5817°W
- Seating capacity: ~64
- Website: lazysusanpdx.com

Lazy Susan was a New American restaurant in Portland, Oregon's Montavilla neighborhood, in the United States. Akkapong "Earl" Ninsom, as well as Andrew and Nora Mace, opened the restaurant in early 2020, just prior to the arrival of the COVID-19 pandemic. Despite garnering a positive reception, the restaurant closed permanently in July 2023.

== Description ==
The restaurant Lazy Susan operated at the intersection of 80th Avenue and Stark Street, in the southeast Portland part of the Montavilla neighborhood. The restaurant's seating capacity was approximately 64.

=== Menu ===
The Oregonian has described Lazy Susan's menu as New American, with jerk quail, crudité platters, izakaya-style mackerel, pies, oysters, morels, prawns, short ribs, and whitefish dip and tender pork secreto. The brunch menu included bacon, cinnamon rolls, hash browns, potato doughnuts, and a Dutch baby pancake with maple-sage sausage and apple slices. Lazy Susan also served a bialy plate with house-cured lox. Pie varieties included beef brisket and porcini mushroom, butterscotch pumpkin with candied pepitas and whipped cream infused with pumpkin seed oil.

The drink menu included the Passive Regression, which had whiskey, coffee crystals, Frangelico liqueur, condensed milk, cream soda, cinnamon, and salt. Lazy Susan also served slushies, described by Alex Frane and Michelle Lopez of Eater Portland as "generally goofy, fun, and incredibly well-balanced, using unusual twists to temper sweetness".

For Thanksgiving in 2021 and 2022, the restaurant's special dinner menu included turkey pot pie, mashed potatoes with wild mushroom gravy, squash, chicory salad, and crackers with whitefish spread, butterscotch pumpkin pie, and select wines by the bottle. The Hanukkah menu included wild mushroom matzah ball soup, sufganiyah, beef-tallow-fried hash browns, bialys, whitefish spread, and king salmon gravlax.

== History ==
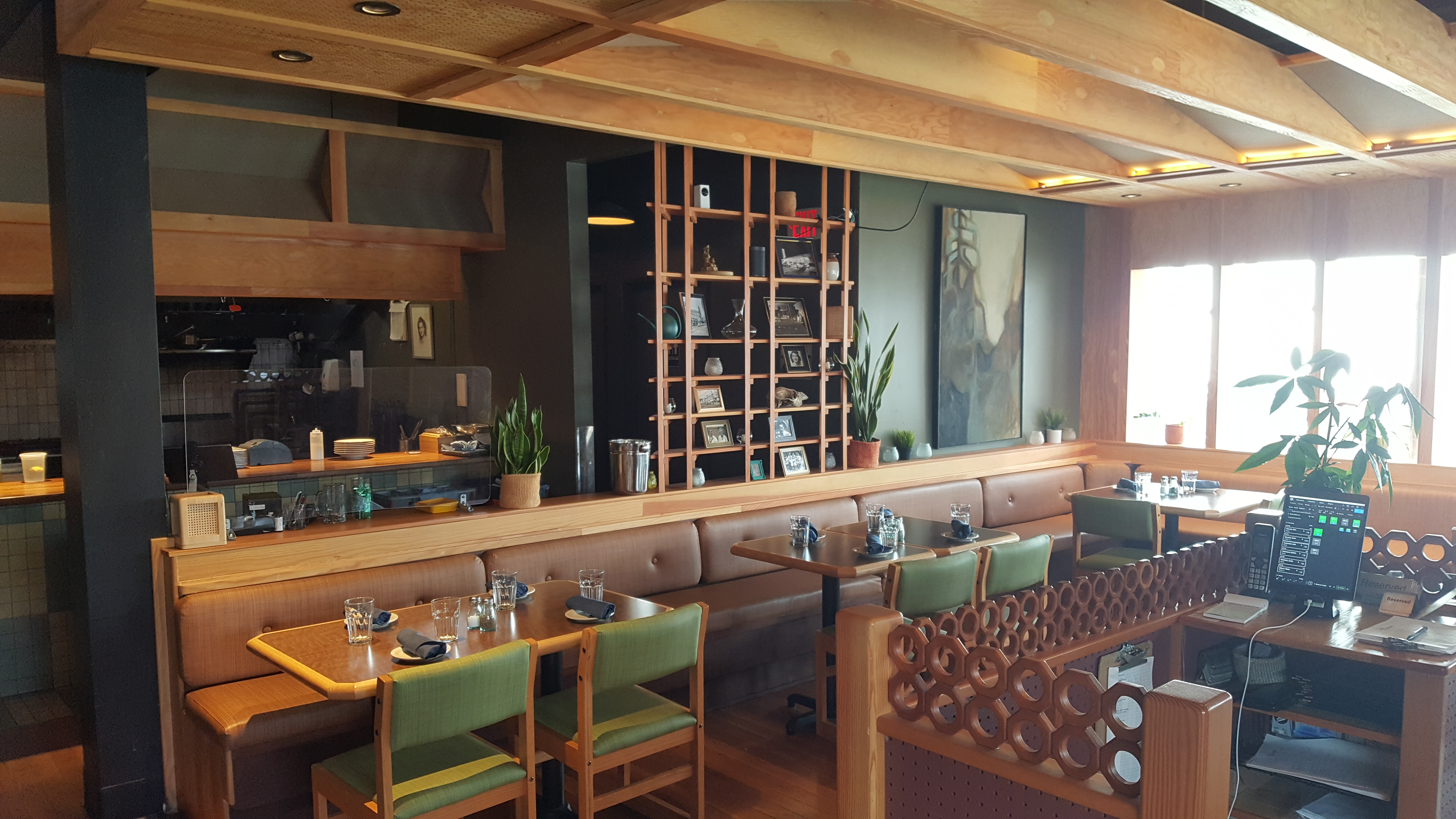
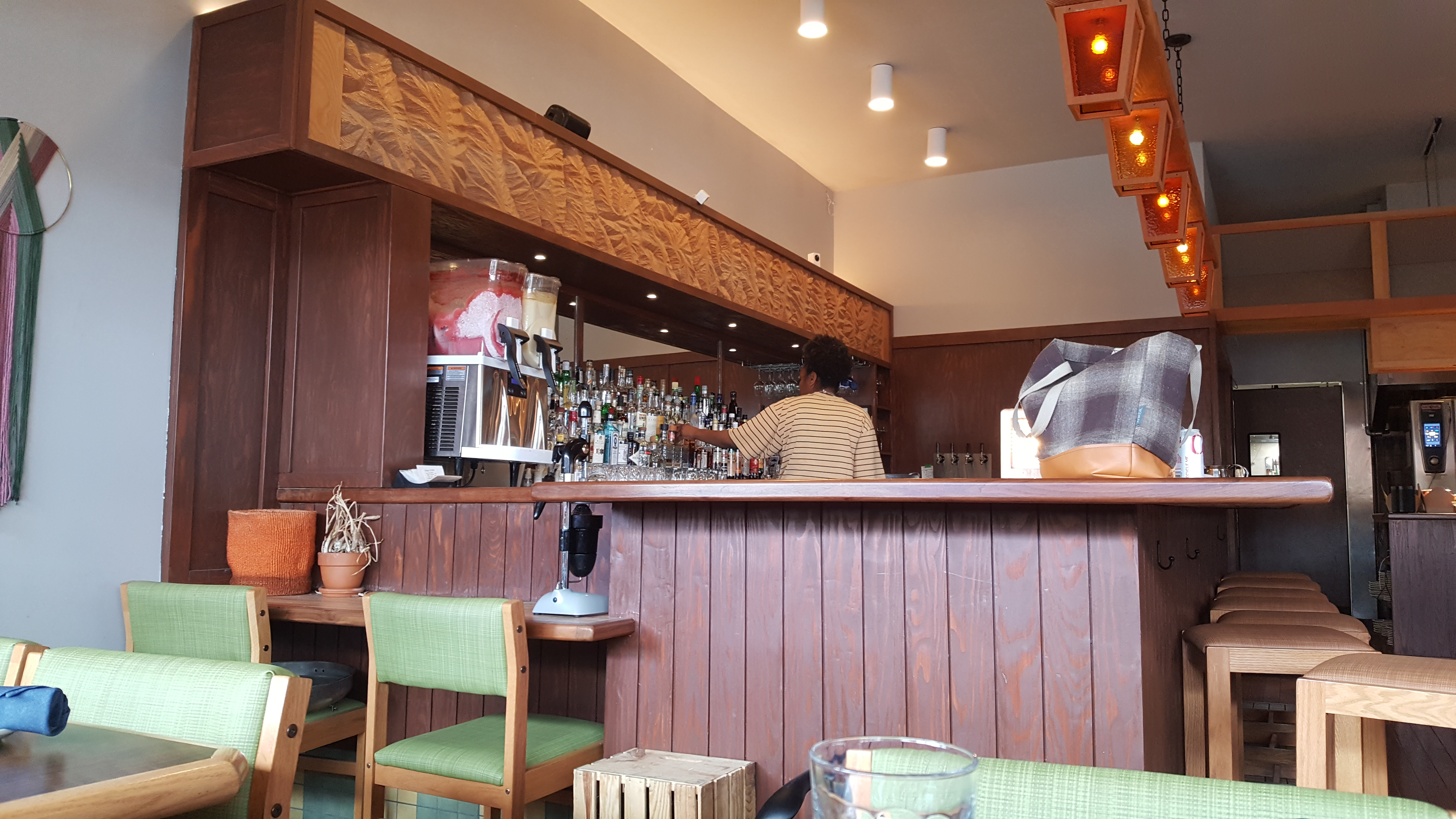
The restaurant's interior, 2022

Lazy Susan was co-owned by Akkapong "Earl" Ninsom, as well as Andrew (who was also the culinary director) and Nora Mace. The restaurant opened in early 2020, weeks before the COVID-19 pandemic's arrival, in the space which previously housed The Country Cat. The interior was designed by Osmose Design.

According to Frane and Brooke Jackson-Glidden Eater Portland, "when COVID-19 hit, the team pivoted into something closer to a backyard cookout, with grilled meats, potato salad, and seasonal vegetable sides". The restaurant initially resisted indoor dining. For a community-supported deli box with three other local businesses, Lazy Susan contributed sausage links with Calabrian chile. In 2021, the restaurant participated in the Nikkei Bake Sale, which raised funds for the Asian Pacific American Network of Oregon (APANO) and the Asian Mental Health Collective.

Outdoor seating capacity was temporarily reduced in 2023 due to road construction. The business later confirmed plans to close on July 23. An announcement read, "We are eternally grateful for all that have shown us love since March of 2020. It has been a wild ride. Pandemic, inflation, wildfires, record-breaking heatwaves, and you all still showed up. So now it's time to come show love one last time." The Asian restaurant Yaowarat opened in the space in October 2023.

== Reception ==
In 2021, Jordan Michelman of the Los Angeles Times highlighted how Lazy Susan and five other Portland restaurants overcame challenges associated with the pandemic to become "statement-making food destinations". He wrote, "In summer of 2021, Lazy Susan has emerged as one of the city's most notable new restaurants, synthesizing a diverse and global set of influences into a menu and bar program that defies easy categorization." Eater Portland's Brooke Jackson-Glidden included Lazy Susan in a 2021 guide to weekend brunch in Portland and a 2022 list of 18 "date-worthy" restaurants in the city open on Mondays. She and Frane included the restaurant in a 2022 list of 19 "jaw-dropping" happy hours in Portland. Frane and Nathan Williams included Lazy Susan in a 2022 overview of recommended eateries in Montavilla. Michael Russell included the restaurant in The Oregonian's 2023 list of Portland's ten best new brunches.

== See also ==
- List of New American restaurants
