= Hat Yai (restaurant) =

Thai restaurant in Portland, Oregon, U.S.

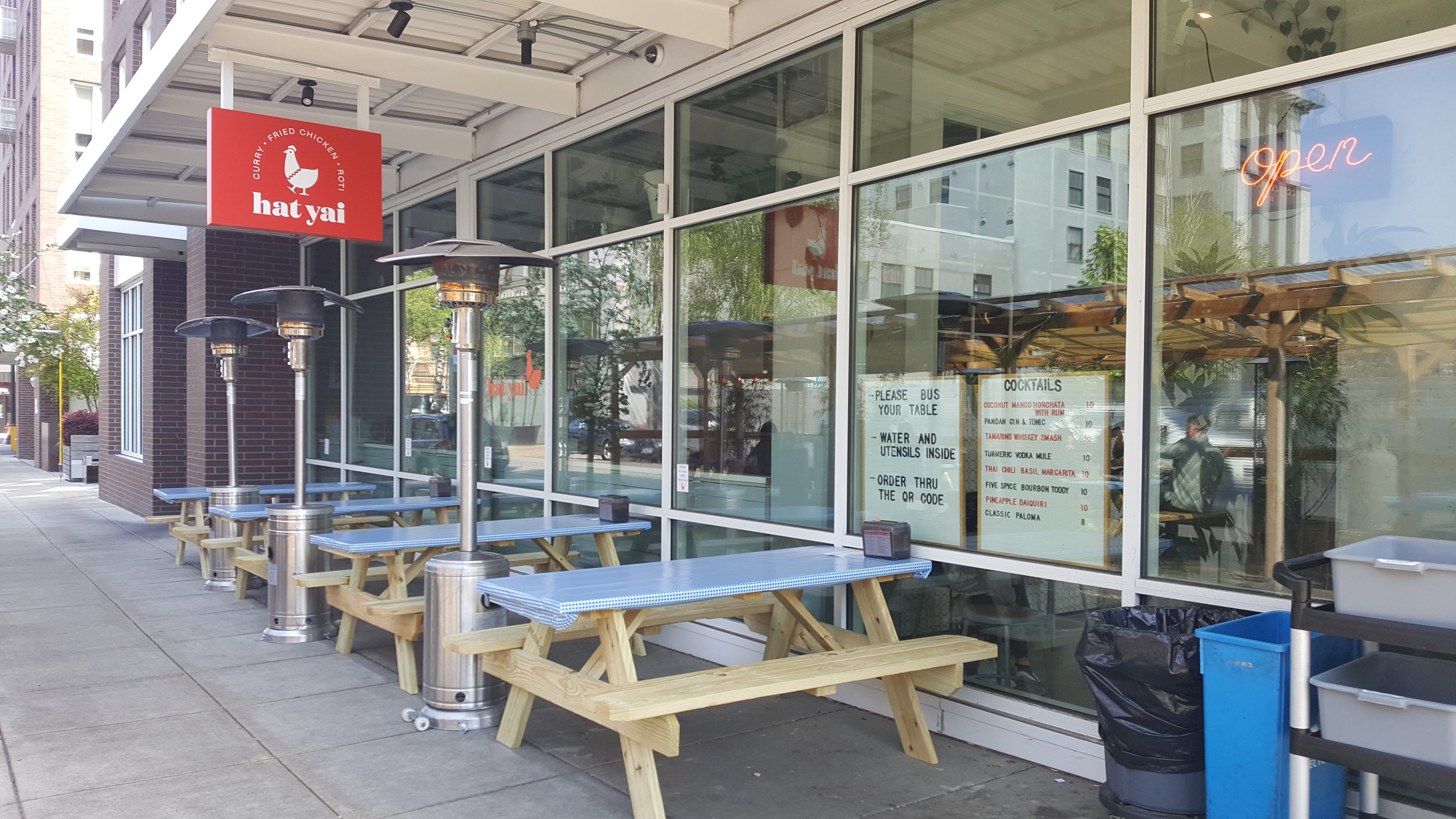
- Exterior of the restaurant in southeast Portland, Oregon's Buckman neighborhood, 2022

Restaurant information
- Owners: Earl Ninsom; Alan Akwai
- Food type: Thai
- Location: Portland, Multnomah, Oregon, United States
- Website: hatyaipdx.com

Hat Yai is a Thai restaurant with two locations in Portland, Oregon, United States.

== Description ==
Hat Yai is a Thai restaurant in Portland, Oregon, named after the city in Thailand of the same name. The original restaurant on Killingsworth Street in northeast Portland's Vernon neighborhood has a seating capacity of 36–38. Andi Prewitt of Willamette Week said of the location:

The humble skinny strip of a dining room echoes the simplicity of those stands, and you can watch the team work quickly but methodically in an open kitchen. There's just a hint of stateside Southern character, too, and not just because there's fried chicken. Countryfied touches extend to the rustic wood, cheery blue-and-white vinyl tablecloths and drinks served in Mason jars.

A second restaurant operates in southeast Portland's Buckman neighborhood. The menu includes rice-battered fried chicken.

== History ==
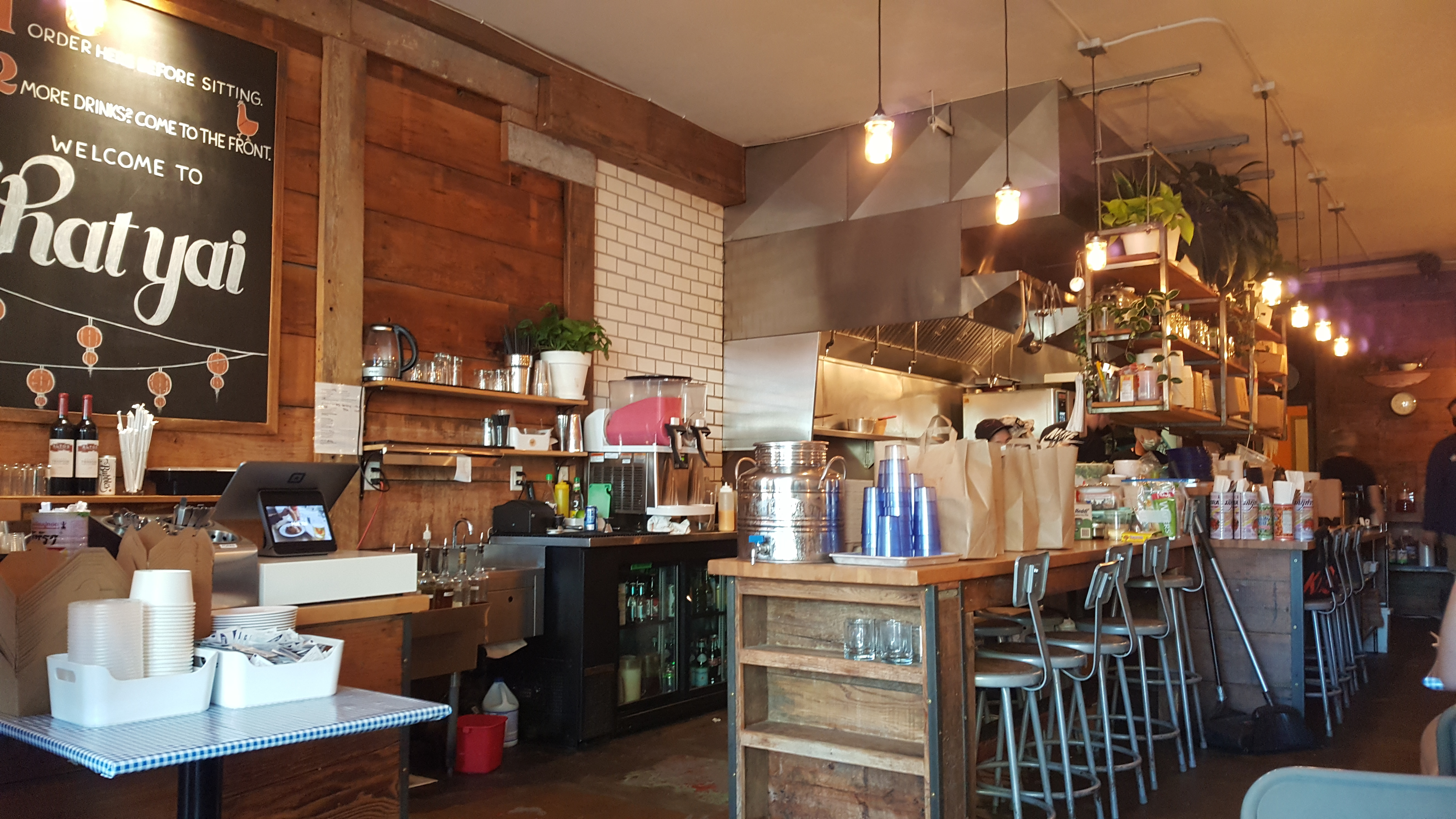
Interior of the restaurant in northeast Portland in 2022

Construction of the first restaurant was underway, as of December 2015. Hat Yai's menu was revealed in early 2016. Plans for a second restaurant in southeast Portland were confirmed in October 2017.

The business is owned by chef Earl Ninsom and Alan Akwai.

== Reception ==
In 2016, Alex Frane included Hat Yai in The Daily Meal's "ultimate guide to Portland's best Asian fried chicken". Matthew Korfhage named the restaurant Willamette Week's Pop-In of the Year. He also included Hat Yai in the newspaper's 2017 list of sixteen "great" eateries in northeast Portland. In 2017, The Oregonian's Michael Russell called Hat Yai the "Southern star in Portland's Thai food constellation".

Brooke Jackson-Glidden included the fried chicken combo in Eater Portland's 2024 overview of "iconic" Portland dishes. Hat Yai was also included in the website's 2025 list of Portland's best restaurants for mid-week lunches. Katrina Yentch included Hat Yai in the website's 2025 overview of the best restaurants in Buckman. The business was included in Time Out Portland's 2025 list of the city's eighteen best restaurants. Writers for Portland Monthly included the fried chicken combo in a 2025 list of the city's "most iconic" dishes.

== See also ==
- List of Thai restaurants
