= The Country Cat =

Restaurant in Portland, Oregon, U.S.

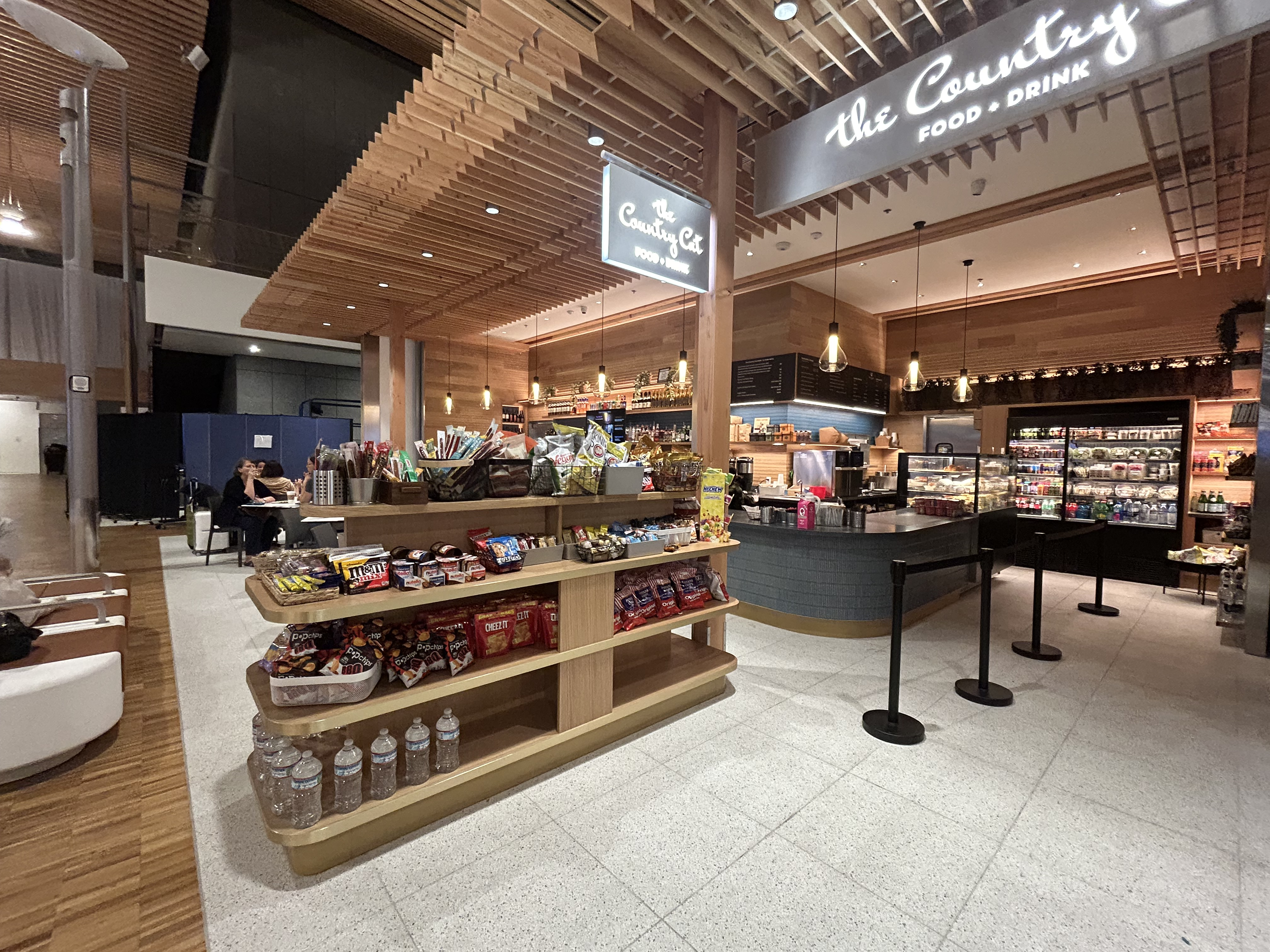
- The Country Cat at Portland International Airport, 2024

Restaurant information
- Food type: Southern
- Location: Portland, Oregon, United States

The Country Cat is a Southern restaurant in Portland, Oregon, United States. The original restaurant operated in southeast Portland from 2007 to 2019, and a second location has operated at the Portland International Airport since 2015.

== History ==
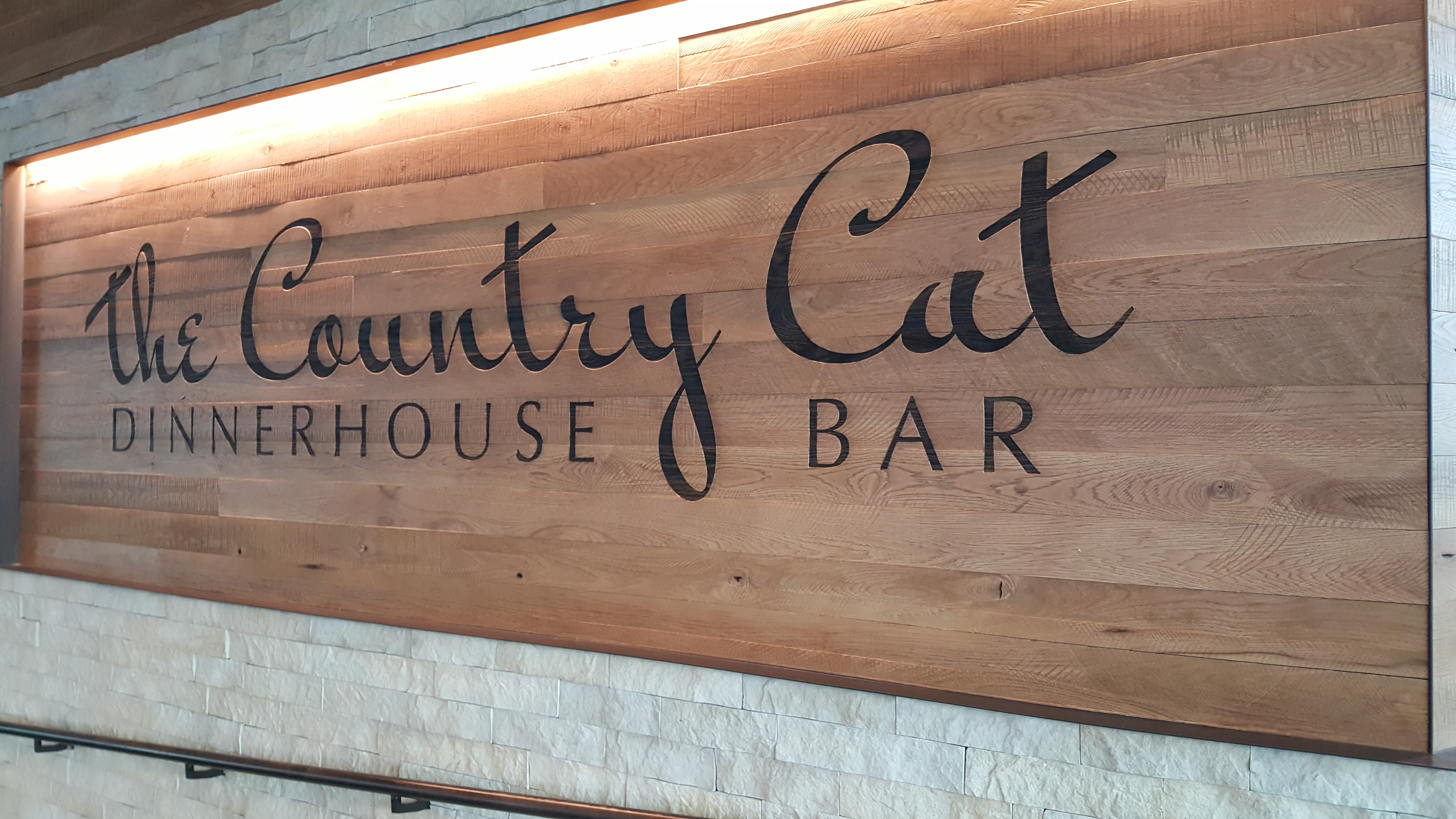
Sign at the former Portland International Airport location, 2021

Adam and Jackie Sappington opened the original restaurant in southeast Portland's Montavilla neighborhood in 2007, followed by a second at the Portland International Airport in 2015. The Montavilla restaurant closed in 2019, but the airport location continued to operate. In 2023, the business confirmed plans to convert the airport location into more of a deli and market.

The original location was featured on a 2013 episode of Diners, Drive-Ins and Dives, hosted by Guy Fieri.

In 2024, due to the Portland Airport being remodeled, The Country Cat relocated to a pre-security location in the new terminal.

== See also ==
- List of Southern restaurants
