= Langbaan =

Thai restaurant in Portland, Oregon, U.S.

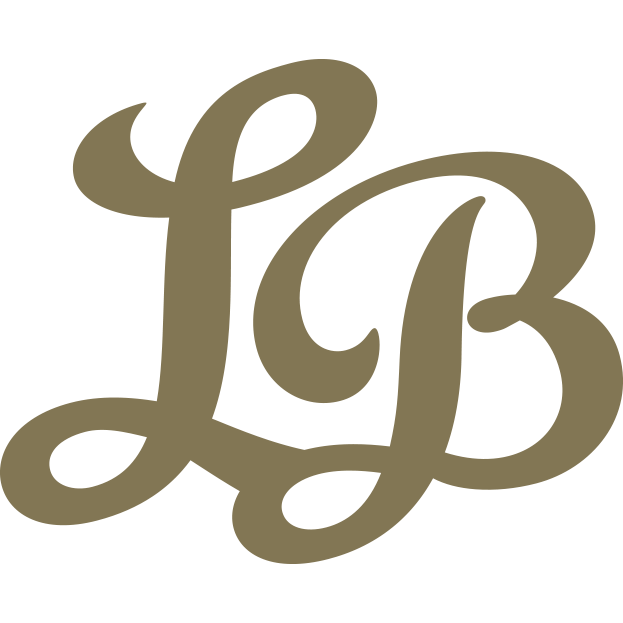
- Interactive map of Langbaan

Restaurant information
- Food type: Thai
- Location: 1818 Northwest 23rd Place, Portland, Oregon, 97210, United States
- Coordinates: 45°32′09″N 122°41′59″W
- Website: langbaanportland.com

Langbaan is a Thai restaurant in Portland, Oregon, United States. In 2024, Langbaan won in the Outstanding Restaurant category of the James Beard Foundation Awards.

== Description ==
Portland Monthly said Langbann as "looks like a foodie's vision of a Bangkok night market". Langbaan has been described as a "restaurant-within-a-restaurant" (PaaDee). PaaDee has also been described as Langbaan's "sibling" restaurant.

== History ==
The restaurant is relocating from southeast Portland to northwest Portland in 2021.

== Reception ==
Michael Russell of The Oregonian described Langbaan as "arguably America's finest Thai restaurant". He ranked the business number 2 in the newspaper's 2025 list of Portland's 40 best restaurants.

Langbaan received the 2023 "Outstanding Restaurant" award from the James Beard Foundation, awarded in June 2024. It was included in The Infatuation's 2024 list of Portland's best restaurants. Rebecca Roland included the ban binn in Eater Portland's 2025 overview of the city's eleven best restaurants for desserts. Hannah Wallace included the business in Condé Nast Traveler's 2025 list of Portland's 23 best restaurants. The business was included in Portland Monthly's 2025 list of 25 restaurants "that made Portland".

== See also ==
- List of Thai restaurants
