= Labor trafficking in the United States =

Labor trafficking in the United States is a form of human trafficking where victims are made to perform a task through force, fraud or coercion as it occurs in the United States. Labor trafficking is typically distinguished from sex trafficking, where the task is sexual in nature. People may be victims of both labor and sex trafficking.

== History ==
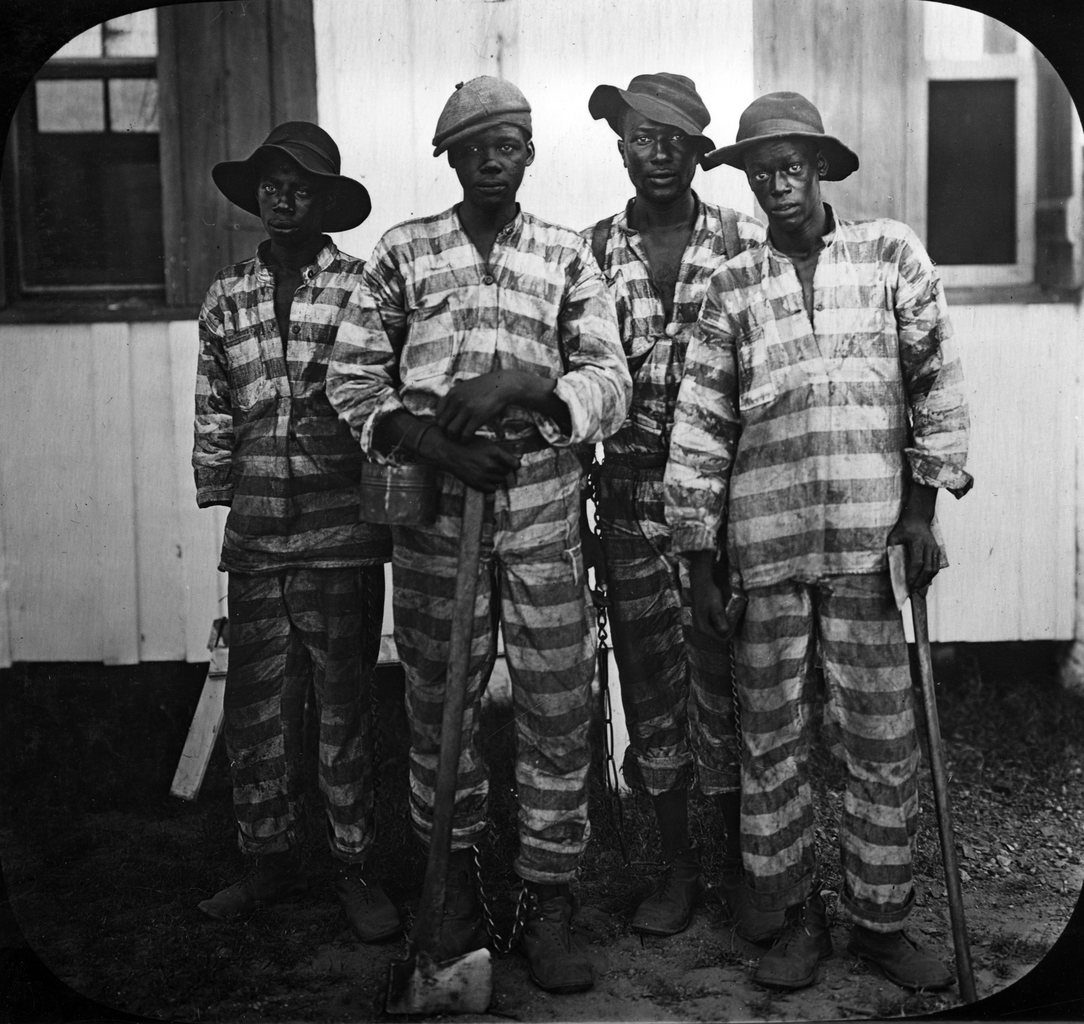
Convicts leased to harvest timber circa 1915, in Florida

Many Native American tribes practiced some form of slavery before the European introduction of African slavery into North America; but none exploited slave labor on a large scale. The arrival of the Europeans ushered in the Atlantic slave trade, where Africans were sold into chattel slavery into the American continent. It lasted from the 15th through 19th centuries and was the largest legal form of human trafficking in the history of the United States, reaching 4 million slaves at its height. It first became illegal in the northern states, which favored other forms of human trafficking, such as debt bondage. Following the Civil War, chattel slavery became illegal throughout the United States through the thirteenth amendment, except as punishment for a crime. Three years later, the peonage system of slavery was abolished in New Mexico Territory.

Though the amendment formally abolished slavery throughout the United States, the amendment did not clearly define slavery. Factors such as Black Codes, white supremacist violence, and selective enforcement of statutes continued to subject some black Americans to involuntary labor, particularly in the South. Employers had complete control over black employees, and were allowed to use corporal punishment. If blacks tried to "escape" employment, they were arrested and brought back to their employers. They were also arrested and enslaved if they failed to find a job or were homeless. Many blacks were arrested for minor offenses and subject to often brutal forms of penal labor. A system of convict leasing emerged which sold black prisoners to do the work previously done by slaves. The black codes were eventually overturned and ruled unconstitutional during the civil rights movement.

In addition to race-based slavery, many poor Americans were enslaved through debt bondage. One common system was the truck system, in which victims were paid in credits to the company store. The pay was not enough to sustain life, and so victims were often indebted to the company store, and were unable to leave until the debt was repaid. The 19th and 20th centuries saw major reforms of labor law and debt bondage is outlawed. Today, illegal forms of unfree labor are considered labor trafficking. Under federal law, this includes any form of force, fraud or coercion, but differs under state law.

At the beginning of the 19th century, there was growing concern over "white slavery", which referred to the kidnapping of females to work in the sex industry. A number of laws, such as the Mann Act, were passed to protect white females, and eventually extended to children and women of all races and to a lesser degree men. The laws have continued to change, especially regarding the boundary between a willing prostitute and an innocent victim. Currently, under federal law, prostitutes are considered a victim of human trafficking if either under 18 or being controlled through force, fraud or coercion. However, this is not fully implemented, and in many states, prostitutes who are considered victims under federal law are still arrested and prosecuted under state law. Some states have adopted the federal standard, while others have only partially adopted them.

== Estimates on prevalence ==
It is difficult to determine the exact extent of labor trafficking in the United States because of the secretive nature. The U.S. government only keeps a count of survivors, defined as victims of severe instances of human trafficking, who have been assisted by the government in acquiring immigration benefits. The National Institute of Justice (NIJ) notes that while only 15% of trafficking cases identified by law enforcement involve labor trafficking, there is significantly more labor trafficking victims seeking service than sex trafficking victims. They suggest that labor trafficking victims are harder to identify, that police and prosecutors were unfamiliar with labor laws, they lacked the infrastructure to identify labor trafficking, and research tends to focus on sex trafficking.

According to the National Human Rights Center in Berkeley, California, there are currently about 10,000 forced laborers in the U.S., around one-third of whom are domestic servants and some portion of whom are children. In reality, this number could be far higher due to the difficulty in getting exact numbers of victims, due to the secretive nature of human trafficking. Research at San Diego State University estimates that there are 2.4 million victims of human trafficking among illegal Mexican immigrants. Research by the Urban Institute says that law enforcement agencies do not prioritize labor trafficking cases, were reluctant to help victims obtain authorization to legally remain in the United States, and felt there was not enough evidence to corroborate victim statements.

In 2014, the National Human Trafficking Resource Center reported 990 cases of forced labor trafficking in the US, including 172 which also involved sex trafficking. The most common types of labor trafficking included domestic work, traveling sales crews, agriculture/farms, restaurant/food service, health & beauty services, begging, retail, landscaping, hospitality, construction, carnivals, elder care, forestry, manufacturing, and housekeeping.

== Agriculture ==
In the agriculture sector, the most common victims of trafficking are U.S. citizens and legal permanent residents, undocumented immigrants, and foreign nationals with temporary H-2A visas. Due to the nature of agricultural work as being seasonal and transient, the ability of employers to exploit these workers is high. Such exploitation may take the form of threats of violence and playing on vulnerabilities (i.e. immigration status). In some cases, workers are held in a state of perpetual debt to the crew leaders who impose mandatory transportation, housing and communication fees upon the workers which are high in relation to pay received, therefore further indebting the worker. Crew leaders may also provide workers with H-2A visas and transportation to the place of work from a home country.

JB Farm Labor contractor hired hundreds to work on an asparagus farm in San Joaquin County. Once hired, they were held hostage and threatened with physical harm if they complained to authorities. After California Rural Legal Assistance was unable to locate JB Farm Labor contractor, they sued the grower who was ordered to pay the workers back-pay. In 2010, the company Global Horizons was indicted on charges of trafficking more than 400 Thai workers through a program of bonded labor. Charges were ultimately dropped in 2012.

In November 2002, Ramiro Ramos, his brother Juan, and their cousin Jose Luis, sub-contractors of a farm in Immokalee, Florida, were charged ten to twelve years each for holding migrant workers in involuntary servitude. The human trafficking ring was uncovered by the Coalition of Immokalee Workers, a local organization that focuses on human rights of the Mexican and Central American immigrants in the region who are exploited for cheap or unpaid labor. The Coalition has also led the Campaign for Fair Food, which resulted in the Fair Food Program. They argued that larger companies put pressure on suppliers to constantly cut prices, leading many suppliers to engage in human trafficking. They successfully campaigned for several large companies to only buy tomatoes from growers that followed certain standards that guarded against human trafficking and pay them an extra cent per pound for tomatoes which would go directly to the growers.

From 2015 to 2017, Bladimir Moreno, owner of Los Villatoros Harvesting LLC, ran a racketeering-style forced-labor scheme using H-2A agricultural visas, across several U.S. states, including Florida, Kentucky, Indiana, Georgia, and North Carolina. He charged inflated recruitment fees, confiscated passports, imposed debt burdens, housed workers in crowded unsanitary conditions, and threatened them with deportation if they refused. In 2022 he pleaded guilty to RICO and forced-labor conspiracy, and was sentenced to 118 months in federal prison, plus over US$175,000 restitution.

== Fishing ==
According to an Associated Press investigation published in 2016, exemptions from federal human trafficking, minimum wage, and other labor protection laws have allowed certain fishing boats to operate with foreign workers in what critics have described as a "human trafficking scheme" and debt bondage. The exemptions apply to "highly migratory species" caught outside the Exclusive Economic Zone, in practice largely tuna and swordfish caught off Hawaii. Though the fish are delivered to ports on Honolulu and San Francisco, crew members are not allowed to leave the vessels for years at a time, and have their passports held by boat owners. Paid as little as $0.70 per hour, some fishermen work in unsanitary conditions, and some report abuse or being deceived into taking a job which they thought would pay considerably more than the land-based jobs they were leaving. The fish are sold on to restaurants, hotels, and stores like Sam's Club and Costco; Whole Foods Market suspended purchases after the AP report.

Bills to reform state and federal laws have been introduced, but as of November 2017, have not been passed. Activist groups filed a request for investigation with the Inter-American Human Rights Commission in July 2017, though the commission can only make non-binding recommendations. In January 2018, one boat owner settled a human trafficking lawsuit brought by two escaped fishermen, but the practice largely continues.

== Garment industry ==
The garment industry is particularly susceptible to labor trafficking in part because of a highly immigrant work force, low profit margins, and a tiered production system. The production of garments is often divided into several parts. Major retailers will often subcontract work to different companies, which will subcontract to other smaller companies. The limited number of contracts will often go to the cheapest subcontractor. The largest cost is often human labor, so subcontractors that pay their employees the least are often the ones that get the contracts. Because of the tiered nature, it is difficult to regulate and there is little incentive to verify that subcontractors are obeying the law. Coupled with a worker population that is vulnerable because of their visa status and unfamiliarity with American laws, this creates a system that is ripe for human trafficking.

In the El Monte Thai Garment Slavery Case, 72 Thai nationals were discovered working and living in an apartment complex ringed with barbed wire and spiked fences, sewing clothes for major retailers and manufacturers in El Monte, California. Some of the captives had been held for as long as seven years by the leader of a human trafficking ring, "Auntie Suni." The play Fabric was based on the events of the case.

In the United States v. Kil Soo Lee, Lee was the director of Daewoosa, Ltd., a garment factory located in American Samoa. Lee recruited internationally for his workers, targeting Vietnam, China and Samoa. The workers were required to pay $3,600 to $8,000 to be hired plus an additional $5,000 if not completed. When they arrived, Lee detained their passports. The living conditions were highly controlled, including a curfew. Complaining about the conditions resulted in punishment: lack of food, physical abuse, detainment or deportation. The United States Department of Labor (DOL) and the National Labor Relations Board (NLRB) began, in May 1999, an investigation on Lee, eventually reimbursing many unpaid workers. The day the back payments were made, Lee demanded the workers sign the checks over to him, which he placed in his personal account.

== Domestic labor ==
Domestic servitude is the forced employment of someone as a maid or nanny, and victims are often migrant women who come from low-wage communities in their home countries. Domestic workers perform duties such as cleaning, cooking and childcare in their employers home. They are commonly US citizens, undocumented workers or foreign nationals most commonly holding one of the following visa types: A-3, G-5, NATO-7 or B-1 The most common victims of this type of trafficking are women. Similar means of control to agricultural work are common. Additionally, a lack of legislation regarding the duties and protection of these workers facilitates their exploitation. Employers often use workers' lack of knowledge of the language or legal system as a means of control and intimidation. This is also commonly paired with various forms of abuse and/or passport revocation. Many domestic workers are brought to the United States on a promise of a better life or an education. Traffickers are usually married couples from the same country of origin as the trafficked person, and are usually not involved in organized criminal networks, making it more difficult to identify instances of this type of trafficking. Perpetrators of domestic servitude are often well-respected members of their communities and lead otherwise normal lives. Areas with large middle-class and upper-middle-class populations are commonly the destinations of this type of trafficking.

The Associated Press reports, based on interviews in California and Egypt, that trafficking of children for domestic labor in the U.S. includes an extension of an illegal but common practice in Africa. Families in remote villages send their daughters to work in cities for extra money and the opportunity to escape a dead-end life. Some girls work for free on the understanding that they at least will be better fed in the home of their employer. This custom has led to the spread of trafficking, as well-to-do Africans accustomed to employing children immigrate into the U.S.

Legally employed domestic workers are distinct from illegally employed domestic servants. While legally employed domestic house workers are fairly compensated for their work in accordance with national wage laws, domestic servants are typically forced to work extremely long hours for little to no monetary compensation, and psychological and physical means are employed to limit their mobility and freedom. In addition, deportation threats are often used to discourage internationally trafficked persons from seeking help.

== Peddling and begging ==
According to the Department of Health and Human Services, instances of trafficking of adults and children in traveling sales crews, peddling and begging rings are rising.

In one highly publicized case, a group of deaf Mexicans were kidnapped and brought to New York City to sell key chains and miniature screwdriver kits in the subways, at airports, on roadsides. All of their earnings were turned over to the bosses, who controlled their food and sleeping arrangements. They were forced to work 18 hours a day and were not allowed to contact family. They were discovered after two of the slaves escaped and made their way to the police.

=== Traveling sales crew ===
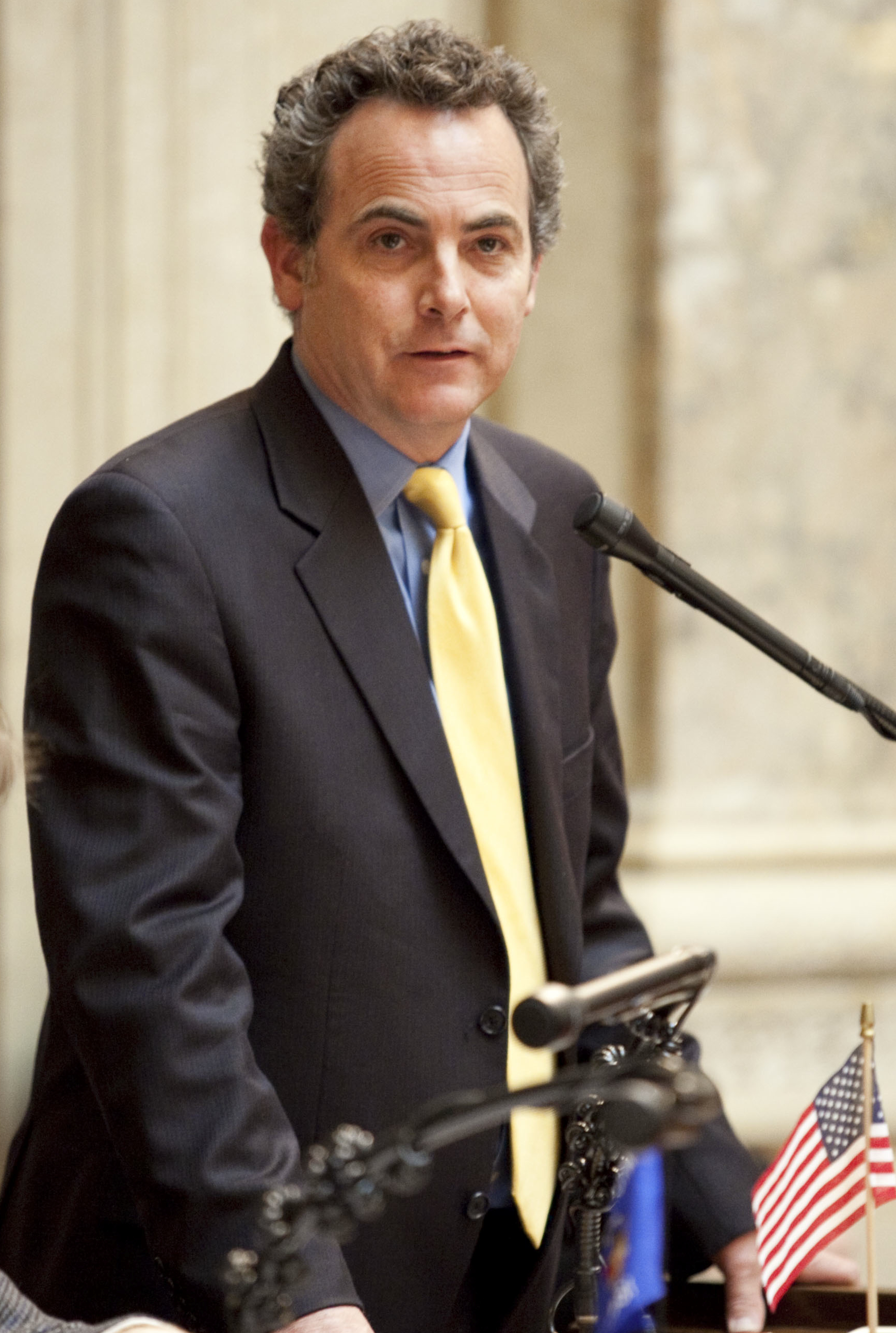
Jon Erpenbach authored Malinda's Traveling Sales Crew Protection Act.

Traveling sales crews have the highest rate of labor trafficking after domestic labor. The traveling nature makes it easier for traffickers to control their victims' sleeping arrangements and food and to alienate them from outside contact. Traffickers may withhold food or threaten to abandon their victims in unfamiliar locations without money if they do not comply. Unlike other professions, members of traveling sales crews are considered independent contractors even if they do not have any autonomy in their life outside of work. As independent contractors, they are not overseen by several laws meant to prevent abuse, such as Title VII of the Civil Rights Act of 1964. Victims often incur debt from their traffickers, and enter into a form of debt slavery.

Malinda's Traveling Sales Crew Protection Act is a Wisconsin law that gives traveling sales crew members similar employment rights as part-time workers in Wisconsin are currently guaranteed by state law. It also requires all crews to register with the Department of Agriculture, Trade, and Consumer Protection before going door to door in state communities. By registering members of the crew, alerts for members with outstanding warrants in other states can be identified and criminals detained. It is the only law in the United States that regulates traveling sales crews. Wisconsin governor James E. Doyle said the intent of the law is to "stop companies from putting workers in dangerous and unfair conditions". The bill was passed in a form that applies only to sales workers who travel in groups of two or more. It was authored by Jon Erpenbach. Southwestern Advantage lobbied against the bill, arguing that their independent contractor business model nurtured the entrepreneurial spirit. During the hearings, former Southwestern student dealers testified on both sides of the issue.

== Military ==
The United States Armed Forces has been alleged to hire contractors to conduct work on its overseas military bases that are engaged in what some auditors describe as potentially "forced labor and human trafficking." These contractors' workers are often foreign laborers that conduct their work in poor and sometimes dangerous conditions for low pay. Additionally, the contractors sometimes keep their workers' passports, which restricts their freedom of movement.

== Media ==
- The actress Julie Parrish appeared as Mariana Jaramilio in the 1967 episode "Along Came Mariana" of the syndicated television series Death Valley Days, hosted by Robert Taylor. In the story line, Mariana works against great odds and tradition to unravel the peonage system in the New Mexico Territory.
- "Sixteen Tons" is a song by Tennessee Ernie Ford about debt bondage under the truck system among coal miners in Kentucky in the early 1900s. The practice was since made illegal and is considered a form of labor trafficking.
- The Men of Atalissa is a documentary film by POV.org and The New York Times about 32 intellectually challenged people who were employed by Texas-based Henry's Turkey Service without proper compensation, and were abused physically and mentally, living in harsh conditions, at Atalissa, Iowa for more than 30 years beginning in the 1970s. The men, paid a wage of $65 a month and sheltered in an old uphill schoolhouse, were used for meat processing. Their conditions were made public in 2009 leading to a $240 million jury verdict, subsequently reduced to $50,000 per person. The documentary is based on court records and internal documents of the company and features first-time interviews with seven of the victims.
- In October 1910, Florida sugar cane plantation planter Edgar Watson was shot and killed by his own neighbors; according to legend he would use peonage Native American and Negro help and then would "pay" his workers by killing them. His story was fictionalized by writer Peter Matthiessen in his Lost River Trilogy, later remade into Shadow Country.
- The film Boy Slaves is an exposé of child labor. Children entrapped in peonage strike for better food, try to alert the government, but fail in these attempts.
- Manderlay is a movie set in the early 1930s, which tells the story of Grace, an idealist who attempts to oust the owners of a plantation in Alabama and free the slaves living there.
- Slavery by Another Name is a book by American writer Douglas A. Blackmon, published by Anchor Books in 2008. It explores the forced labor of imprisoned black men and women through the convict lease system used by states, local governments, white farmers, and corporations after the American Civil War until World War II in the southern United States. The resulting book was well received by critics and became a New York Times Best Seller. In 2009, it was awarded the Pulitzer Prize for General Nonfiction, and in 2011 was adapted into a documentary film for PBS.
- Call + Response is a documentary film released in 2008 by Fair Trade Pictures to support human rights activism against human trafficking and slavery on a community level. The film was Justin Dillon's directorial debut and has received worldwide recognition, becoming one of the most important devices in spurring the modern-day abolitionist movement and was one of the year's top documentaries.
- Fabric is a play based on a sweatshop in El Monte, California.

== See also ==
- Sharecropping in the United States
- Convict lease
- Peon
- Labor history of the United States
