= Fabric (play) =

Fabric, written by playwright Henry Ong, is the only known dramatization of the 1995 El Monte Thai Garment Slavery Case. First performed in 2000, it was produced by the Company of Angels in 2010, in partnership with the Thai Community Development Center to commemorate the 15th anniversary of the landmark case. In 2015, it was reprised and presented at the Pasadena Playhouse as part of a month-long celebration of the 20th anniversary of the case.

== Background ==
On August 2, 1995, in El Monte, California, 72 Thai nationals were discovered working and living in an apartment complex ringed with barbed wire and spiked fences, sewing clothes for major retailers and manufacturers. Some of the captives had been held for as long as seven years by the leader of a human trafficking ring, "Auntie Suni." The story made national and international headlines as the first case of modern-day slavery since the abolishment of slavery in the United States.

== Production ==
Playwright Henry Ong, upon reading an account of the raid in the Los Angeles Times, contacted Chanchanit Martorell, executive director of the Thai Community Development Center. Martorell agreed to put Ong in touch with the people involved in the case, including the Thai garment workers.

Ong received a City of Los Angeles Cultural Affairs Department grant to write the play. In addition to interviews with the principal players, Ong did extensive research and visited the Smithsonian Institution which had created an exhibit on the history of garment workers to collect additional data and information. He developed the play over four years through workshops and readings. Singapore Repertory Theatre staged Fabric in a world premiere in 2000. This was followed by a production by Nomad Theater in Surrey, England the next year. Company of Angels produced it in 2010, in association with Thai Community Development Center, in commemoration of the 15th anniversary of the Thai garment workers slavery case.

== Synopsis ==
The play interweaves two stories. The first follows a group of Thai nationals who are lured into coming to America to work in a garment factory by a human trafficking ring, masterminded by a Thai national (known as Auntie Suni) who was assisted by her sons and daughters in-law. Once in America, these workers found themselves confined in an apartment building which had been converted into an underground sewing shop. Under the control of Auntie Suni, the men and women were forced to work long hours (from 7 a.m. to midnight), with no weekend breaks or holidays, to pay off their debts to the traffickers.

The other narrative thread follows the law enforcement investigation. A garment worker escapes from the premise. She speaks about her predicament to an Immigration Officer, who is familiar with Thai culture, having worked in Thailand for many years and being married to a Thai woman.

Through investigations by both the Immigration and Naturalization Service; and the State Labor Commission, a raid is planned on the apartment complex. Auntie Suni, the ring leader, and her family members are arrested and brought to justice. The workers are freed and allowed to live in the United States.
