= Julie Su (disambiguation) =

Julie Su (born 1969) is an American attorney.

Julie Su may also refer to:

- Julie-Su, a fictional character in the Archie Comics series Sonic the Hedgehog
- Su Rui (born 1952), also known as Julie Su, Taiwanese singer
