= El Monte Thai garment slavery case =

1995 US slavery case in California

On August 2, 1995, 72 Thai nationals were found working in conditions of slavery in a makeshift garment factory consisting of a row of residential duplexes in El Monte, California, just east of Los Angeles. This case is considered the first recognized case of modern-day slavery in the United States since the abolition of slavery. It would serve as a wake-up call for the world to the global phenomenon of human trafficking and modern-day slavery and would begin the anti-trafficking movement in the United States with the Thai Community Development Center as its pioneer. The case would also lead to the passage of California laws to reform the garment industry and end sweatshop abuses through independent monitoring and a code of conduct and then eventually to the Victims of Trafficking and Violence Protection Act of 2000 (TVPA) passed by the United States Congress (later known as the Trafficking Victims Protection Reauthorization Act (TVPRA).

== The Beginning ==
As early as 1988, recruiters in Thailand were canvassing rural villages in the provincial parts of Thailand for garment workers. Many of the garment workers came from impoverished farming families and were eager to take any opportunity to better their life circumstances. Rotchana, one of the 72 workers discovered in the sweatshop, said she wanted to go to America so she could have a better life for herself and her children. She said the recruiter was kind and generous promising her a legitimate job that would enable her to quickly pay off the $4,800 loan she secured from the recruiter to pay for the plane ticket and processing fee to the United States.

Elsewhere in Thailand, many others were hearing the same story. They were taken to the airport and given expensive jewelry to wear so that they would appear to be wealthy tourists. Having passed the Immigration Control, the recruiters took the jewelry, their passports and their money. They transported the workers to the El Monte complex—a row of two story buildings with boarded up windows and a fence surrounding the entire compound topped with barbed wire and spikes facing inward. Two guards armed with guns, knives and baseball bats patrolled the building twenty-four hours a day.

Once at the El Monte complex, the Thai nationals were forced to sew clothing seventeen to twenty-two hours a day. They were not allowed any contact with the outside world and their letters home were censored, opened and read to insure no news of their captivity would reach home. They were not allowed breaks even when sick or any social interactions with each other. They were under 24/7 surveillance by armed guards. Some were held against their will for as long as seven years.

The workers were virtually not paid as they had to work off their debt to their traffickers/employers. In essence, they became indentured servants. However, they were forced to buy food and personal supplies such as toothpaste and shampoo at inflated prices from the employers residing at the complex who operated sundries in the garages. Having no money to make their purchases, these amounts for the rent and personal items would just be tacked on to their debts. Therefore, their debt just kept growing with no end in sight.

They sewed clothing for many well-known brands such as Anchor Blue, B.U.M., High Sierra, CLEO and Tomato Inc. The workers were forced to wake up at six every morning and worked under the watchful eyes of their Thai national employers who included Suni Manasurangkun and her four sons and two daughters-in-law.

The workers were warned if they dared escape, both they and their families back home would be physically harmed. They were also threatened that they will be caught by United States authorities who will shave their heads and deport them back to Thailand. The threat of retaliation was constant and relentless. The guards even showed them a picture of the last man who had tried to escape—he had been beaten.

== Discovery and Freedom ==
The barbed wire, Rotchana and the others later discovered, had been installed after one victim escaped from a second story window. Too scared to contact the police, the woman told her story only to her boyfriend years later during her freedom. But eventually the story was repeated by her co-worker and reached the ears of State of California Deputy Labor Commissioner TK Kim who was inspecting the garment factory where she, her boyfriend, and the co-worker were working.

On August 1, 1995, Deputy Labor Commissioner TK Kim came to the office of the Thai Community Development Center (Thai CDC) and met with its Executive Director, Chanchanit Martorell, and requested the Thai Community Development Center’s participation in a multi-governmental agency raid on the El Monte compound. These agencies participating in the raid included the State of California Department of Industrial Relations - Division of Labor Standards Enforcement (California Labor Commission or DLSE), the United States Department of Labor - Wage and Hour Division, the State of California Occupational Safety and Health Administration, the State of California Employment Development Department, the El Monte Police, and the Thai Community Development Center. At the pre-dawn hour of 5 am on August 2, 1995, the raid occurred on the El Monte slavery compound. The law enforcement authorities which included the El Monte Police and Sworn California Peace Officers from DLSE secured the site first in the raid of the El Monte compound and the rest of the agencies including Thai CDC followed in to find the workers and separate them from the employers. Chanchanit Martorell, the Executive Director of the Thai CDC, participated in that raid and once on the scene, started speaking to the frightened workers in their native tongue calming their fears and reassuring them that they were now liberated and no harm will come to them. She explained who Thai CDC was and the role it will play in bringing them relief and helping them pursue justice.

From the El Monte compound, instead of being turned over to Thai CDC to be sheltered and cared for as promised, the workers were transported to the Immigration and Naturalization Services (INS) detention where the workers were detained and held captive again but this time in the hands of the United States government for another nine days. Thai CDC and its ally, the Korean Immigrant Worker Advocates immediately formed a broad coalition of civil, immigrant, workers’ rights organizations that included the Coalition for Humane Immigrant Rights of Los Angeles (CHIRLA), Korean Immigrant Worker Advocates (KIWA - known today as the Koreatown Immigrant Workers Alliance), Asian Pacific American Legal Center (APALC – known today as the Asian Americans Advancing Justice), and the Union of Needletrades, Industrial and Textile Employees (UNITE) to fight for the release of the workers from detention. During those nine days, the coalition visited the detention center demanding access to the El Monte workers, held press conferences and sit-ins, and pressed for their immediate release into the care of Thai CDC.

After nine long days and nights in detention – a period during which the workers were shackled whenever they were transported between the INS holding tanks in Downtown Los Angeles and the federal detention center at San Pedro Terminal Island – the workers were finally permitted to take off their orange prison garb and put on their own clothes and leave INS into the care of Thai CDC. They were allowed to board a donated yellow school bus arranged by CHIRLA and head for temporary shelters arranged by Thai CDC including shelters belonging to the Methodist Church in North Hollywood, the Episcopal Church in Tujunga, and the Filipino American Service Group, Inc. (FASGI) in Los Angeles only after UNITE was able to persuade the United States magistrate to allow the workers to be released on “signature bonds” as opposed to cash bonds as a way of securing the workers’ return to court to testify as witnesses in the criminal prosecution of their captors as the workers were now designated by the United States federal court as material witnesses. Thai CDC arranged for those bonds to be signed by its supporters and allies.

Thai CDC began the arduous task of providing the workers with emergency relief and resettlement assistance. It obtained work authorizations and social security numbers for the workers, held meetings with the coalition and the workers on pursuing their redress and restitution while participating in KIWA’s Retailer Accountability Campaign to reform the garment industry where the workers also participated and learned to become activists themselves, created a support fund for the workers, and assisted the workers in obtaining permanent housing, healthcare, employment, legal, language, and acculturation assistance.

Seven of the on-site operators of the sweatshop were taken into federal custody and pleaded guilty to criminal counts of involuntary servitude and conspiracy. Two brothers evaded arrest and fled to Thailand and are still considered fugitives by the United States government.

Since the United States did not have immigration relief laws in place at the time for trafficked victims, the workers were at risk of being deported soon after the successful prosecution of their traffickers. The case was prosecuted by Assistant US Attorneys, Michael Gennaco and Tom Warren. INS Special Agent Philip Bonner utilized another law to help keep them in the country. His clever use of the S visas, colloquially known as “snitch” visas used for drug snitchers in drug trafficking cases, not only allowed the victims a reprieve while in the United States but secured the ability of the workers to adjust to permanent legal residency status after three years of continued presence in the United States. Since the workers fell under this category, they were able to remain in the United States avoiding deportation where they most certainly would have faced retaliation from their traffickers in Thailand.

A civil case was also pursued on the behalf of the workers. On the civil case, the workers won a $4 million settlement from the retailers and manufacturers who profited from their slave labor. The legal agencies that helped the workers with the civil suit were the Asian Pacific American Legal Center, Los Angeles; Asian Law Caucus; ACLU Immigrants Rights Project; the ACLU Foundation of Southern California; and the Law Firm of Dan Stormer and Della Behan. The lead attorney was Julie Su.

The families of the workers were reunited with them in the United States and the workers have since become independent and productive individuals who found steady employment outside the garment industry or became business owners with the help of Thai CDC’s small business program and entrepreneurship training and are now naturalized United States citizens and spokespersons against human trafficking and modern-day slavery.

== Media ==
The 2010 play Fabric, by Henry Ong, was based on the events of the case.
