= Vince Micone =

American governmental official

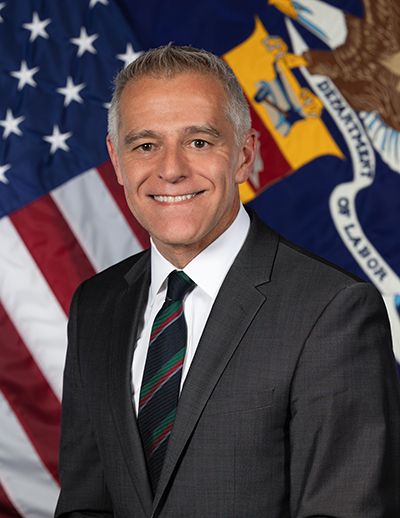
- Official portrait, 2025

Acting United States Secretary of Labor
- In office January 20, 2025 – March 11, 2025
- President: Donald Trump
- Preceded by: Julie Su (acting)
- Succeeded by: Lori Chavez-DeRemer

Personal details
- Education: Arizona State University, Tempe (BA); University of Southern California (MPA)

Vince Micone is an American civil servant who acted as the United States secretary of labor from January to March in 2025, while he was the deputy assistant secretary for operations from 2023 to 2025. Micone is one of five openly gay men to have served in the Cabinet of the United States.

== Personal life ==
Micone graduated from Arizona State University (BA) and the University of Southern California (MPA).

== Political career ==
Micone started his political career working at the Department of Justice through the Presidential Management Fellows program. Later he served in the Department of Treasury, Department of Homeland Security and the Department of Commerce.

=== Acting Secretary of Labor ===
He served as the acting secretary of labor from January 20 to March 11, 2025. During his time leading the Department of Labor, he complied with DOGE initiatives of the Trump administration. In an email at the time, he wrote "We are taking steps to close all agency DEIA offices and end all DEIA-related contracts… These programs divided Americans by race, wasted taxpayer dollars, and resulted in shameful discrimination."

Due to the controversy in complying with DOGE and other initiatives to dismantle DEI policies, he stepped down from a board position with the Capital Pride Alliance (the organization that organizes the pride parade in Washington, DC) that he had held since 2010.

At a March 20, 2026 public roundtable of the D.C. Council's Committee on Transportation and the Environment, an anonymous public witness opposed Micone's confirmation to the D.C. Water Board, criticizing his actions while serving as acting labor secretary and asking, "Does the Committee want someone with his capricious views or his ability to concede so easily just so he can climb the ranks to make decisions for a major American utility?" On March 30, Mayor Muriel Bowser requested that the nomination be withdrawn; her letter did not provide a reason. Cabot Petoia objected to Micone's behavior in an opinion piece for the 51st, writing, "Could Micone have chosen something different? Of course. He could have refused the directive, issued a public statement, or resigned in protest. Instead, he actively chose to further policies designed to harm his own community" and "Micone’s actions harm BIPOC, immigrants, disabled folks, and others who hold marginalized identities. His words also represent a profound betrayal of LGBTQ+ individuals, for whom anti-discrimination laws have been crucial in expanding access to jobs, housing, and health care."

During his tenure, he was also named as a defendant in National Association of Diversity Officers in Higher Education, et al v. Trump, et al due to his part in complying in the dismantling of DEI policies in the federal government.

=== Post-U.S. government career ===
Micone currently works at the National League of Cities as Chief of Staff to CEO & Executive Director Clarence E. Anthony. He also currently serves as the chair of the Advisory Neighborhood Commission 4E.

Clarence E. Anthony, National League of Cities, CEO & Executive Director, and Vince Micone in Philadelphia, Pennsylvania, in May 2026.

Political offices
Preceded by Julie Su; Acting	United States Secretary of Labor; Acting; 2025	Succeeded by Lori Chavez-DeRemer
