= Ena Dubnoff =

American architect

Ena Dubnoff is an American architect based in Santa Monica, California. She is the principal of Ena Dubnoff Architects.

== Education ==
Ena Dubnoff studied for a year at the University of California at Berkeley, but came back to Los Angeles area and enrolled at the University of Southern California (USC). She was the only woman in her class. According to her, many of her classmates were returning Korean War veterans. Dubnoff graduated cum laude, earning a Bachelor of Architecture in 1960. While still at USC she received the AIA Medal for Excellence in Architecture award. In 1966 Dubnoff earned a master's degree in Urban Design from Columbia University. After graduation from Columbia University she traveled widely on the William Kinne Fellows traveling fellowship (1966–1967), and spent a year in India.

== Academic teaching ==
From 1963 to 1965 Dubnoff taught at the Department of Architecture at Pennsylvania State University, where she joined the faculty at the request of Gregory Ain who was the dean of the Department of Architecture there. She also taught at the Southern California Institute of Architecture (SCI-ARC) from 1973 to 1976. In 1981 Dubnoff was hired as the first tenure-track female faculty in architecture at USC where she taught until 1988.

== Architectural work ==
After graduating from USC, Dubnoff collaborated with the office of Buff, Straub and Hensman to design a residence for her parents. The residence was widely published and received several awards. It is included in the 2004 book on Buff & Hensman edited by James Steele; according to the description, it was finished in 1961.

She spent two years on the office of William Pereira and Associates, working on many projects including the Master Plan for the Irvine Ranch, the Master Plan for Catalina Island, and Los Angeles County Museum of Art. In addition, she worked for A. Quincy Jones, and in the New York office of Skidmore, Owings & Merrill.

After Dubnoff received her architectural license, she designed the main building for the Dubnoff School in association with former classmates who founded the firm Flores, Gelman and Greenberg in 1965.

Dubnoff collaborated with Dolores Hayden forming the firm of Dubnoff and Hayden in 1984 to design Willowbrook Green, an affordable housing and Child Care project in the Willowbrook area of Los Angeles. She later formed ONE Company Architecture (later renamed Ena Dubnoff Architects) when Dolores Hayden withdrew to pursue her teaching career. Dubnoff became a founding member of the four-women collaborative named O.N.E.Company, formed in 1991 for the purpose of developing affordable housing. Later, a spin-off non-profit organization named W.O.R.K.S, Women Organizing Resources, Knowledge, and Services was formed to partner with O.N.E. Company. Ena Dubnoff's Architectural practice continued to design projects for non-profit social service agencies and for developers of housing for low-income families. Dubnoff's design work, particularly earlier in her career and as embodied in the Dubnoff Center, is considered exemplary of mid-century Modernism. In addition to her work in architecture, Dubnoff was the co-founder of Westend Printmakers studio in Santa Monica.

She is currently engaged in a second career in woodturning. Her work is being recognized and shown nationally in juried exhibitions and in galleries and shops.

=== Select projects ===
- El Centro del Pueblo, with Fernando Vasquez, 2008. Expanded in 2013. Los Angeles.
- El Centro del Pueblo playground, 2008. Los Angeles.
- Young Burlington Apartments, with Tomko Woll Group Architects, 2008. Los Angeles.
- Jovenes, with Tomko Woll Group Architects, 2008. Los Angeles.
- Planned Parenthood Los Angeles, with Tomko Woll Group and Fernando Vazquez Studio, 2008. Los Angeles.
- Pisgah Village, 2006. Developers: Pisgah Village LLP. Los Angeles.
- Temple Villas, with Tomko Woll Group, 2006. Los Angeles. Developers: ONE Company and W.O.R.K.S.
- Court Street Apartments, with Tomko Woll Group, 2006. Los Angeles. Developers: ONE Company and W.O.R.K.S.
- Ingram Preservation Project, 2005. Los Angeles. Owner: ONE Company and W.O.R.K.S.
- Highland Village Apartments, 2001. Los Angeles. Developers: ONE Company and W.O.R.K.S.
- Park Williams Apartments, 2001. Pomona. Developers: ONE Company and W.O.R.K.S.
- Stevens Place Apartments, 2000. Medford, Ore. Developers: ONE Company and OnTrack.
- Normandie Village, 1999. Los Angeles. Developers: ONE Company and SIPA.
- Halifax Apartments, 1997. Los Angeles. Developers: ONE Company and Thai Community Development Center.
- Somerville Place I & II, 1996. Los Angeles. Developer: Dunbar Economic Development Corporation.
- Willowbrook Green, 1990. Los Angeles. Developer: Drew Economic Development Corporation and County of Los Angeles.

== Awards ==
Dubnoff is a recipient of various awards and honors, including:

- AIA National Award of Merit for the Dubnoff Residence
- Los Angeles Conservancy Preservation Awards for Pisgah Village and for Halifax Apartments
- CCAIA Design Award and the AIA/LA Merit Design Award for the El Centro del Pueblo Youth and Recreation Center
- Urban Land Institute National Award for Excellence for Normandie Apartments
- Urban Beautification Award for Somerville Apartments

== Personal ==
Ena Dubnoff's father, Jacob W. Dubnoff, was a biochemist at the California Institute of Technology (Caltech). Dubnoff's mother, Belle Dubnoff, was an educator, who established the Dubnoff School for Educational Therapy in 1948, now known as the Dubnoff Center for Child Development and Educational Therapy.
