= Julie Su =

American attorney and government official (born 1969)

- 蘇維思
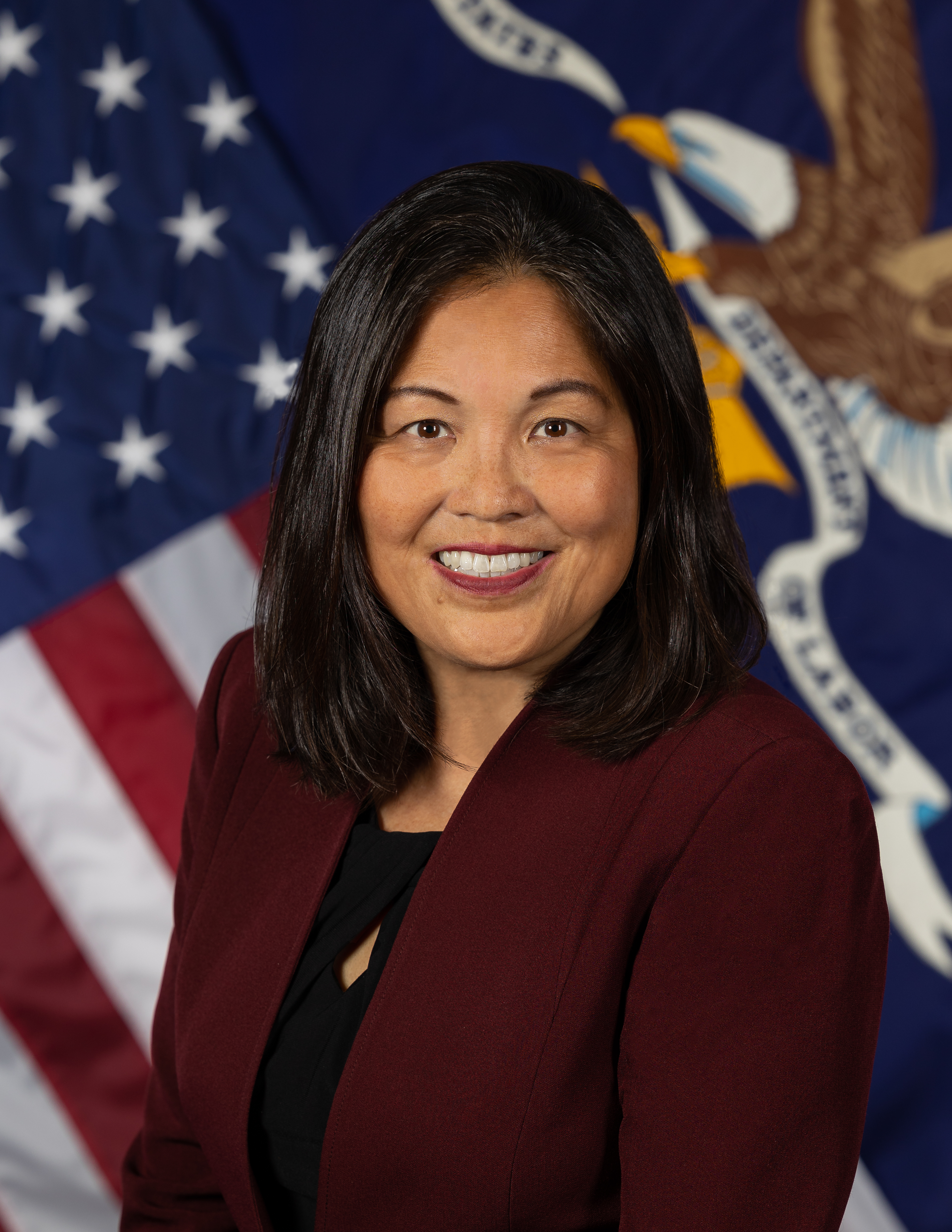
- Official portrait, 2021

Deputy Mayor of New York City for Economic Justice
- Incumbent
- Assumed office March 1, 2026
- Mayor: Zohran Mamdani
- Preceded by: Position established

Acting United States Secretary of Labor
- In office March 11, 2023 – January 20, 2025
- President: Joe Biden
- Preceded by: Marty Walsh
- Succeeded by: Vince Micone (acting); Lori Chavez-DeRemer

37th United States Deputy Secretary of Labor
- In office July 17, 2021 – January 20, 2025
- President: Joe Biden
- Preceded by: Patrick Pizzella
- Succeeded by: Keith Sonderling

Secretary of the California Labor and Workforce Development Agency
- In office January 7, 2019 – July 17, 2021
- Governor: Gavin Newsom
- Preceded by: David Lanier
- Succeeded by: Natalie Palugyai

Personal details
- Born: Julie Ann Su; February 19, 1969 (age 57) Madison, Wisconsin, U.S.
- Party: Democratic
- Education: Stanford University (BA); Harvard University (JD)

Chinese name
- Traditional Chinese: 蘇維思
- Simplified Chinese: 苏维思
Transcriptions
Standard Mandarin
- Hanyu Pinyin: Sū Wéisī
- Wade–Giles: Su^{4} Wei^{2}-ssu^{1}
- Yale Romanization: Sū Wéisz
- IPA: [sú wěɪ.sí]

Julie Ann Su (Chinese: 蘇維思; born February 19, 1969) is an American attorney and government official who has served as Deputy Mayor of New York City for Economic Justice since March 2026. A member of the Democratic Party, Su acted as U.S. secretary of labor from 2023 to 2025, while she was the deputy secretary of labor from 2021 to 2025. She previously served as the California secretary of labor from 2019 to 2021 and California labor commissioner from 2011 to 2018.

Su began her career as a lawyer, notably serving as the lead attorney for the El Monte Thai garment slavery case in 1995. She was appointed as the California labor commissioner by Governor Jerry Brown in 2011, overseeing California's Division of Labor Standards Enforcement, before becoming the state's secretary of labor in 2019 under Governor Gavin Newsom. Su was nominated to serve as the U.S. deputy secretary of labor by President Joe Biden and was sworn in as the 37th deputy secretary on July 17, 2021, following Senate confirmation. Following the resignation of Secretary Marty Walsh, Su became acting secretary on March 11, 2023, and was nominated by President Biden to fill the position permanently. Su's confirmation stalled in the Senate, however, she was retained in an acting capacity for the duration of the Biden administration. Following the election of Zohran Mamdani as mayor of New York City, Su was selected to fill the newly created position of deputy mayor for economic justice, taking office in March 2026.

== Early life and education ==
Su was born in Madison, Wisconsin, as a second-generation American. Her mother, unable to afford a ticket on a passenger ship, came to the United States on a cargo ship from China; her father is from Taiwan. She graduated from Whitney High School in Cerritos, California. She earned a Bachelor of Arts degree from Stanford University in 1991, double majoring in political science and economics. She later earned a Juris Doctor from Harvard Law School.

== Legal career ==
Su started her legal career at the Asian Pacific American Legal Center (later known as Advancing Justice Los Angeles), a non-profit civil rights organization, where she served as a Litigation Director.

Su was the lead attorney for the El Monte Thai garment slavery case. As the lead for civil case brought by the El Monte garment workers, Su successfully pursued a legal theory that held manufacturers responsible for the wage theft, as well as the operators who actually kept the garment workers captive. She and other activists also petitioned for the workers to be able to stay in the United States under a visa program for those who cooperate with the government in criminal trials. This led to the creation of the T visa for victims of human trafficking.

== California government ==
During Jerry Brown's tenure as governor, Su headed California's Division of Labor Standards Enforcement (DLSE) as the California Labor Commissioner. Under Governor Gavin Newsom, Su served as Secretary of the California Labor and Workforce Development Agency.

== United States Department of Labor ==
=== Deputy Secretary of Labor ===
In November 2020, Su was named as a potential candidate to serve as Secretary of Labor in the Biden administration. Su's prospective nomination was pushed by AAPI political leaders and activists, including the Congressional Asian Pacific American Caucus (CAPAC).

Conversely, she was opposed by business groups and congressional Republicans. Opponents criticized her leadership of California's unemployment agency during the COVID-19 pandemic, when over a million legitimate applicants had their claims delayed or frozen, while up to $31 billion was sent to fraudulent claimants. Opposition also centered on her enforcement of California's controversial employment law, AB 5.

On February 10, 2021, Su was nominated by President Biden to be the Deputy Secretary of Labor under Secretary Marty Walsh. Asian-American leaders, including members of the Congressional Asian Pacific American Caucus, had lobbied the Biden administration to appoint her as Deputy Secretary after she wasn't chosen to lead the department.

The Senate HELP Committee held hearings on Su's nomination on March 16, 2021. The committee reported her nomination favorably to the Senate floor on April 21, 2021. On July 13, 2021, Su was confirmed to the role by the Senate in a 50–47 vote.

=== Secretary of Labor nomination ===
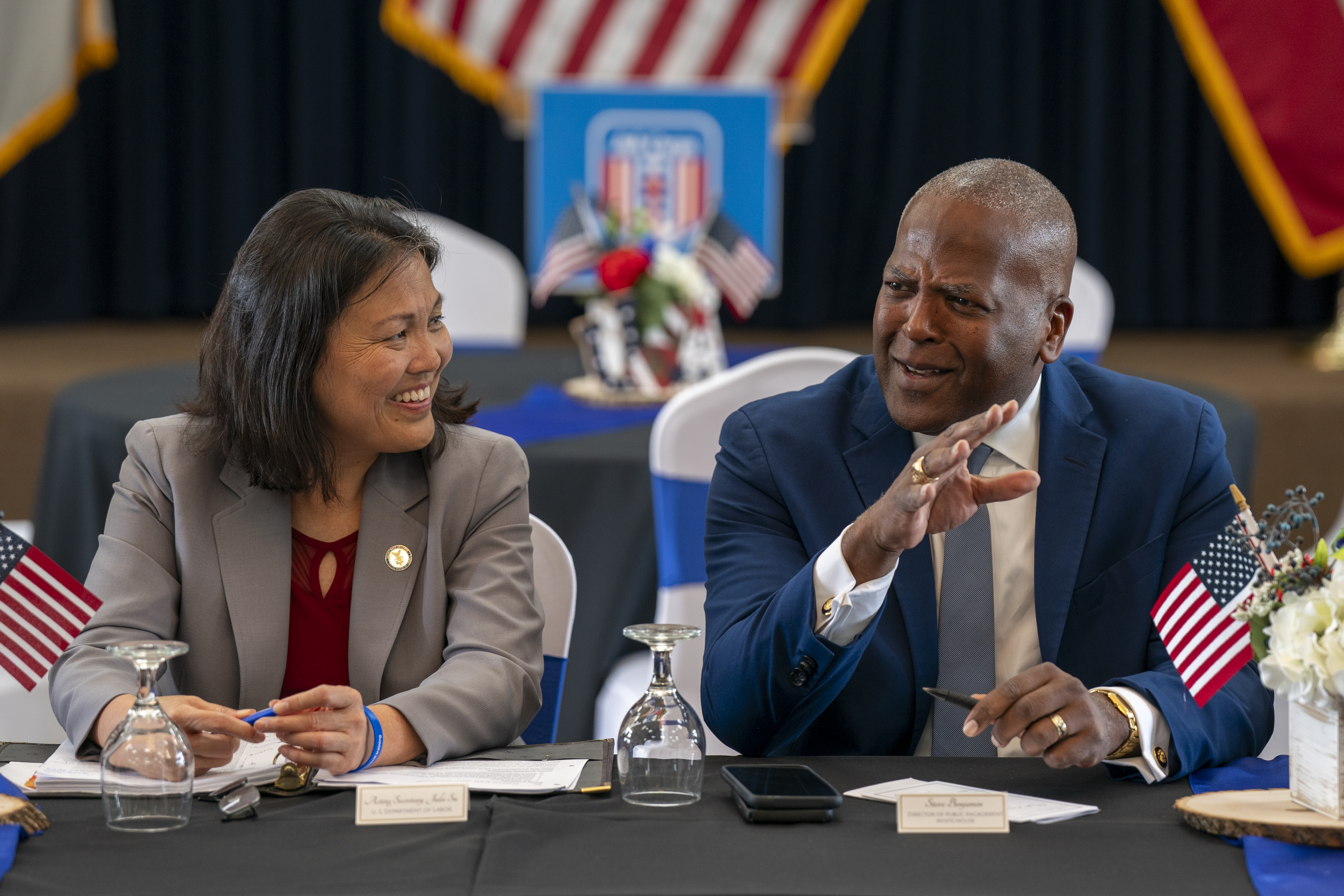
Su with Senior Advisor to the President Stephen K. Benjamin in 2024

After it was reported in 2023 that Walsh would leave the role, Su was expected to serve as acting Secretary of Labor in his absence. After Walsh's resignation announcement, members of the Congressional Asian Pacific American Caucus called on Biden to nominate Su as Walsh's permanent successor, citing the lack of Asian-Americans in Biden's cabinet. On February 28, 2023, Su was nominated to serve as the United States Secretary of Labor.

Su's nomination faced challenges on both sides of the aisle, due to the reluctance of Senator Joe Manchin to support her, as well as Republican criticism of her handling of COVID unemployment relief funding in California, wherein an estimated $31 billion meant to safeguard unemployed Californians during the pandemic ended up being paid out fraudulently. The confirmation process stalled in the Senate due to a lack of votes necessary for confirmation.

Su's nomination expired at the end of 2023, though Biden renominated her in January 2024. On February 27, 2024, the Senate HELP Committee advanced Su's nomination in an 11–10 vote. She remained acting secretary for the remainder of the Biden administration.

The Government Accountability Office responded to a challenge to her serving as acting secretary beyond the 210 day limit as set by the FVRA, and found it lawful because a succession statute specific to the department allows a deputy secretary of labor to serve as acting secretary until a successor is confirmed.

== New York City government ==
On December 19, 2025, Su's appointment was announced for the newly created position of Deputy Mayor of New York City for Economic Justice in the Zohran Mamdani administration. She assumed office on March 1, 2026, after becoming a resident of the city.

== Awards ==
- Skadden Fellowship
- 2001 MacArthur Fellows Program
- 1996 Reebok International Human Rights Award

== Works ==
- "Making the Invisible Visible: The Garment Industry's Dirty Laundry" University of Iowa Journal on Gender, Race & Justice (winter 1997–1998)
- "Critical Coalitions," (with Eric Yamamoto) Critical Race Theory: An Anthology
- "Workers at the Crossfire: Immigration Enforcement to Preserve Capital," in Unfinished Liberation (Joy James, ed. Colorado University Press 1999)
- Social Justice: Professionals, Communities and Law (Martha Mahoney, John O. Calmore, Stephanie M. Wildman 2003).

== See also ==
- Chinese people in New York City

Political offices
| Preceded by Patrick Pizzella | United States Deputy Secretary of Labor; 2021–2025 | Succeeded by Keith Sonderling |
| Preceded by Marty Walsh | United States Secretary of Labor; Acting; 2023–2025 | Succeeded by Vince Micone; Acting |
