= Halifax Apartments =

- U.S. National Register of Historic Places
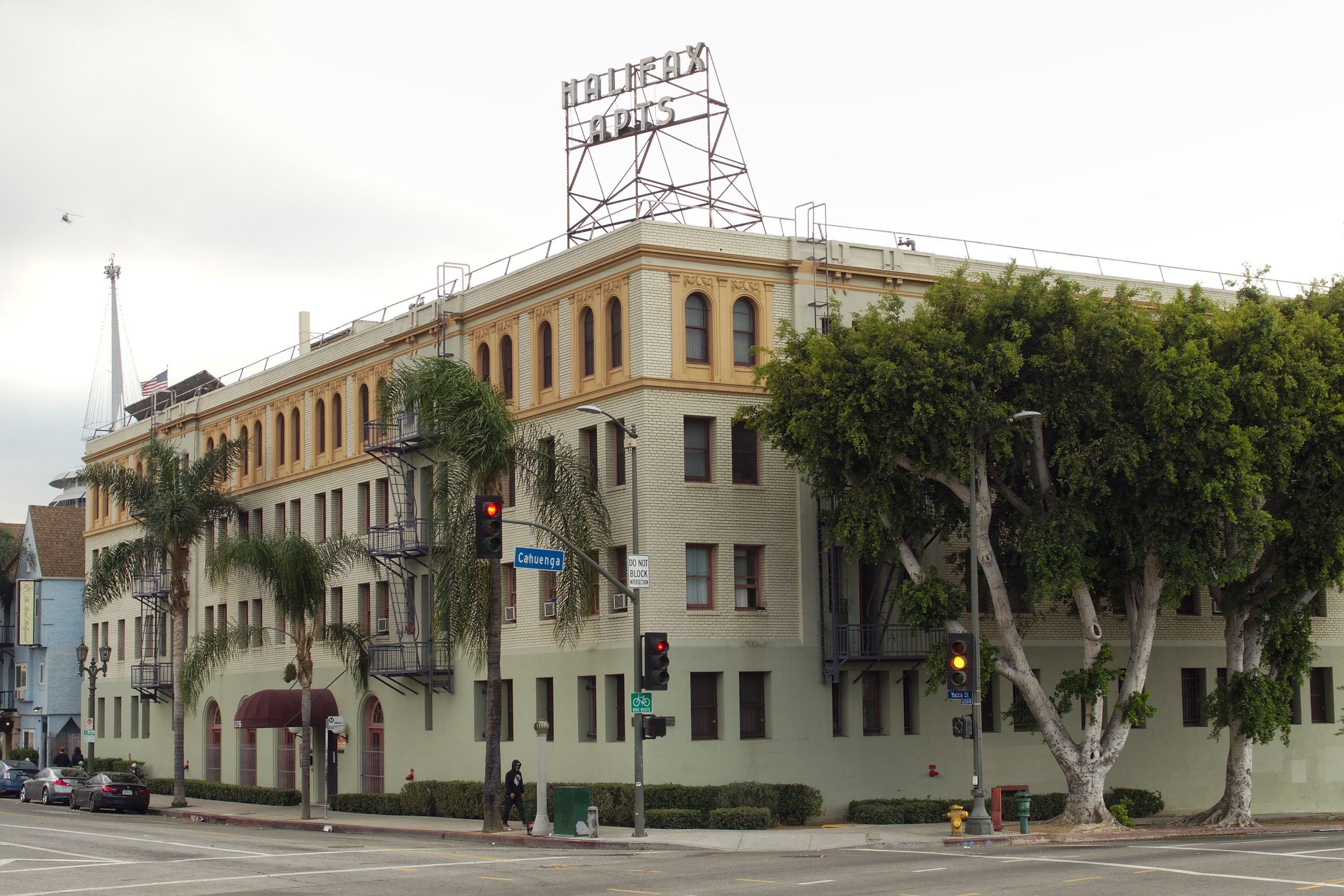
- Halifax Apartments, 2015

- Location within the Los Angeles metropolitan area Location within California Location within the United States
- Location: 6376 Yucca St., Los Angeles, California
- Coordinates: 34°6′13″N 118°19′42″W
- Built: 1923
- Architect: Walker and Eisen
- Architectural style: Renaissance
- NRHP reference No.: 98001242
- Added to NRHP: October 14, 1998

Halifax Apartments, originally known as the Cross Arms Apartments, is a historic apartment building on Yucca Street in Hollywood, Los Angeles, California. Designed by Walker and Eisen, the building was completed in 1923. The building was originally owned by Leach Cross, who named it the "Cross Arms Apartments." At the time of its opening, it was considered one of the largest and most beautiful apartment houses in Hollywood. In October 1924, the building sold for $750,000, and the new owner renamed the building the "Halifax Apartments." In its early years, the Halifax was a popular residence for entertainers, including silent film star Ned Sparks, and opera star Ernestine Schumann-Heink. It was also the site of important gatherings, including a 1937 reception hosted by Joseph Laemmle for Mayor Shaw which was also attended by the chief of police and district attorney. In 1981, the Halifax was converted to Section 8 housing for senior citizens. In 1997, ONE Company, headed by Ena Dubnoff, and the Thai Community Development Center rehabilitated the building, converting 72 single units into 46 units of affordable multi-family housing. The building was added to the National Register of Historic Places in 1998.

== See also ==
- List of Registered Historic Places in Los Angeles
