= Chanchanit Martorell =

Chanchanit Martorell (born in Bangkok, Thailand) is an activist, educator, urban planner, and a community development practitioner. She is the Founder and Executive Director of the Thai Community Development Center (Thai CDC).

== Early life ==
Born in Thailand and raised in Los Angeles, Martorell studied political science and public law at UCLA where she received her B.A. and her M.A. in Urban Planning with a specialization in Urban Regional Development/Third World Development. She also studied Humanities at Chiang Mai University in Northern Thailand in 1988.

Her experiences leading to the founding of Thai CDC included work as a planner, as an aide to Congressman Mel Levine and work with other local and state legislative offices. She also created and taught the first Thai-American Experience course offered as part of UCLA's Asian-American Studies curriculum in 1992.

During Thailand's military coup of 1992, she mobilized the Thai community in Southern California to protest the atrocities committed by the military junta against civilian demonstrators in Bangkok, demanding a peaceful return to democracy for Thailand and its people. After the Los Angeles Civil Unrest in 1992, she co-authored the Mid-City Plan for the Coalition of Neighborhood Developers which sought to address the lack of economic resources in an inner-city area of Los Angeles. The pivotal event also led her to document the demographics and social and human service needs of Thais in Los Angeles for the first time in a landmark community needs assessment study as a way to advocate for more resources in underserved communities.

== Personal life ==
Martorell has been married to her husband, Esteban Martorell since 1994 and has two children.

== Thai Community Development Center ==
Engaged in social activism for the past 35 years, Martorell is currently the Executive Director of the Thai Community Development Center, a non-profit organization she founded in 1994 in an effort to improve the lives of Thai immigrants through services that promote cultural adjustment and economic self-sufficiency.

She has worked on over a half dozen major human rights cases, involving one involving over 400 Thai victims of human trafficking who were discovered working in conditions of slavery in the United States. Her tireless advocacy on behalf of the victims and the success of each case has made her a leading expert and sought-after spokesperson on the serious issue of modern-day slavery. She taught a course entitled "Human Trafficking and Modern-day Slavery" at the UCLA Department of World Arts and Cultures.

Because of her deep commitment to creating positive change, she has also become a leading practitioner in the field of community development engaged in ongoing affordable housing development, small business promotion, and neighborhood revitalization projects. Two of the projects undertaken by Thai CDC under Martorell's leadership include the development of affordable housing through the rehabilitation of one of Hollywood's historical edifices, the Halifax Apartments, and the development of Palm Village, an affordable senior housing project in Sun Valley. In 1999, under her leadership, Thai CDC played a pivotal role in the seven-year-long community organizing campaign which raised community consciousness and led to the designation of the first Thai Town in the nation right here in East Hollywood. The designation of Thai Town allowed the community to define itself and its place in history. For Martorell, the designation of Thai Town was the first step of a multi-faceted, economic development strategy to revitalize a depressed section of Hollywood while enriching the City's cultural and social fiber.

== Organizations ==
Dedicated to social and economic justice, she actively serves in a variety of capacities in a number of community/immigrant/labor rights organizations with local, national, and global concerns, including the California Community Foundation Council on Immigrant Integration, Center for Human Rights and Constitutional Law, the Labor Community Services Program, and the former Mayor's Office of Immigrant Affairs.

She is also the co-founder of the Coalition to Abolish Slavery and Trafficking, The Asian Pacific Islander Small Business Program, the Rotary Club of Thai Town, and the National Coalition for Asian Pacific American Community Development.

Committed to heightening awareness of Thai arts and culture, she also sits on the board of the Thai Community Arts and Cultural Center and serves as an advisor to the Thai New Year Day's Songkran Festival Corporation. Formerly a member of the Convention to Eliminate All Forms of Discrimination Against Women Task Force, she was part of a campaign that succeeded in the performance of a gender analysis by the City of Los Angeles of its personnel.

She served on the Union Bank Community Advisory Board for three years between 2008 and 2011 and was chair in her last year. The members help guide the bank in its community reinvestment activities and outreach efforts in low and moderate-income communities. On September 28, 2005, she was confirmed by the Los Angeles City Council as Commissioner for the Central Area Planning Commission upon being appointed by Mayor Antonio Villaraigosa, became Vice-Chair, and continued serving under Mayor Eric Garcetti until June 10, 2014.

== Publications ==
She is the author of Thais in Los Angeles, a book detailing the history of Thai migration to the Los Angeles area. She is also the co-author and contributing author for two important pieces on human trafficking: "The Importance of Ethnic Competency: The Thai Case of Labor Trafficking and Temporary Worker Visa Immigration/Migrations" and "Exploitation and Abuse in the Garment Industry: The Case of the Thai Slave Labor Compound in El Monte".

Chanchanit Martorell has also written the following pieces on community development: "Urban Revitalization: The State of Asian Pacific America: Economic Diversity, Issues, and Politics" and "Beyond Asian American Poverty: Community Economic Development Policies and Strategies".

== Awards ==
Chanchanit Martorell has been the recipient of numerous awards that recognized her as a tireless defender of social justice and human rights.

Special Invitation to the White House on Combating Human Trafficking - 2012

Phenomenal Woman Award from California State University, Northridge, Women and Gender Studies Department - 2012

Outstanding Service Award from the Thai Association of So. California - 2012

Royal Decoration of the Most Admirable Order of the Direkgunabhorn from His Majesty King Bhumibol Adulyadej of Thailand - 2012

Special Recognition in Honor of AAPI Heritage Month from Congresswoman Karen Bass - 2012

Dream of Equality Award from Asian Americans For Equality - 2012

Inclusionary Award from Assemblyman Mike Eng, 49th District - 2011

API Heritage Month Honoree from Assemblyman Kevin De Leon, 45th District - 2010

Sheroes Award from State Senator Curren Price, 26th District - 2010

Exemplary Leadership Award from Thai Association of So. California - 2008

Advocate Award from Kasetsart University Alumni Association, USA - 2008

Unsung Hero Award from KCET - 2004

Violence Prevention Initiative Fellow, The California Wellness Foundation - 2001-2003

Woman of Courage Award from City of Los Angeles Commission on the Status of Women - 1998

Mentor Award from Los Angeles Women's Foundation - 1997

Leadership Award from Leadership Education for Asian Pacifics - 1997

Woman Warrior Award from Asian Pacific Women's Network - 1996

Distinguished Service Award from Asian Pacific American Labor Alliance - 1996

Solidarity Award from Korean Immigrant Workers’ Advocates - 1996

"A Woman Making a Difference in the Heart of Los Angeles," California Legislative Certificate of Recognition from Assemblyman Louis Caldera - 1995

"In honor of your courage and efforts to bring just and safe conditions to working men and women in the garment industry," Certificate of Recognition, California State Senate - 1995

Asian American Leadership Award from Asian Business Association - 1995

Community Service Award from UCLA Graduate School of Architecture and Urban Planning- 1993

Golden Bear Award for Community Service from UCLA - 1990
