= United States v. Kil Soo Lee =

Daewoosa, Ltd. was a garment factory located in American Samoa. The owner, operator, president and director of Daewoosa was Kil Soo Lee. Lee recruited internationally for his workers, targeting Vietnam, China and Samoa. The workers were required to pay $3,600 to $8,000 to be hired for three years; if they did not finish their term, they were charged an additional $5,000 causing each of the workers and their families significant hardship.

Lee controlled all of the living conditions for the workers inside a highly secured compound. He controlled what the workers ate, whether or not they could leave the compound, with whom they could speak outside of the company and when they worked, hours for which they were often not compensated. If workers returned to the compound after the nightly curfew, they were abused by the guards. Complaining about the conditions resulted in punishment: lack of food, physical abuse, detainment or deportation.

To reinforce the workers' enslavement, Lee threatened arrest and jail time for noncompliance. Upon arrival to the island, Lee charged exorbitant fines for their immigration card and detained their passports so they could not leave the country or find another employer.

Lee was investigated on several occasions for unlawful labor practices, but used coercion and threat, promising to withhold food and pay, or deport workers, to ensure workers dropped their cases. The United States Department of Labor (DOL) and the National Labor Relations Board (NLRB) began, in May 1999, an investigation on Lee, eventually reimbursing many unpaid workers. The day the back payments were made, Lee demanded the workers sign the checks over to him, which he placed in his personal account.

== The Tipping Point ==
Daewoosa received a large order from J.C. Penney, which needed to be completed within two months. Lee ordered his factory manager, Elekana Nuu'Uli Ioane to "beat [workers] up and send them home" if they were not working as quickly as necessary. A Vietnamese woman, Truong Thi Le Quyen, became a victim of this threat and was choked by the manager. This spurred 20 Samoan security workers to beat the women in Quyen's sewing line with plumbing pipes, eventually gouging out one of Quyen's eyes. The scene afterwards was described as a "massacre", with blood covering the factory floor and garments. A few months later, on January 12, 2001 the plant was ordered by a Samoan court to be taken over by a receiver.

== Consequences ==
The FBI secured a warrant on March 23, 2001 and arrested Lee in American Samoa for involuntary servitude and forced labor; he was escorted directly to the District of Hawaii. He was indicted by a federal grand jury for 22 counts including involuntary servitude, extortion, money laundering, false financial reporting and bribery of a bank official.

The jury trial commenced on October 22, 2002. It included 36 witnesses, including 21 individuals from the factory. Several counts were dismissed, but Lee was found guilty of 14 of the remaining 18 counts. His sentence included 480 months in prison, $1,826,088 in restitution payments and $1400 in court fines.

Lee processed appeal No. 05-10478, United States Court of Appeals for the Ninth Circuit: United States of America vs. Kil Soo Lee on June 22, 2005, Fed. R. App. P. 4(b)(2). He argued that the District of Hawaii was the wrong venue for his trial, and that he should be tried in American Samoa instead of Hawaii. The judge denied the appeal, stating that Hawaii was in fact the right place to try him, as American Samoa does not have courts to prosecute and that the US Courts have jurisdiction for these federal crimes.
