= Thai Community Development Center =

American nonprofit organization in Los Angeles, California

- Abbreviation: Thai CDC
- Formation: April 13, 1994; 32 years ago
- Founder: Chanchanit (Chancee) Martorell
- Founded at: Los Angeles, California, US
- Type: Nonprofit
- Location: Los Angeles
- Services: Immigrant support and services
- Official language: English, Thai
- Executive Director: Chanchanit (Chancee) Martorell
- Website: www.thaicdc.org

The Thai Community Development Center (Thai CDC) is a nonprofit NGO in Los Angeles, California that assists Thai and other immigrants.

== History ==
Thai CDC was founded by Chanchanit Martorell on April 13, 1994, with the idea that all peoples have a basic right to a decent standard of living and quality of life. Since its establishment, Thai CDC has addressed the needs of Thai and other disadvantaged immigrants faced with substandard housing conditions and lack of access to basic health services, education and employment opportunities.

== Mission ==
The mission of the Thai Community Development Center is "to advance the social and economic well-being of low and moderate income Thais and other ethnic communities in the greater Los Angeles area through a comprehensive community development strategy including human rights advocacy, affordable housing, access to healthcare, promotion of small businesses, neighborhood empowerment, and social enterprises."

== Core programs and services ==
=== Affordable housing ===
==== Developments ====
Thai CDC has developed 106 units for very low and low-income individuals and families. Thai CDC completed the historic rehabilitation of the renowned Halifax Apartments in Hollywood in partnership with a women- and minority-owned for-profit developer, the Organization for Neighborhood Empowerment Company (O.N.E.) in 1997, converting 72 single units into 46 units of affordable multi-family housing. Thai CDC, in partnership with the Little Tokyo Service Center Community Development Corporation (LTSC CDC), a Los Angeles nonprofit organization, completed the development of 60 units of senior affordable housing, Palm Village Senior Housing, in March 2008.

==== Housing counseling program ====
Thai CDC used to provide foreclosure assistance to troubled homeowners in August 2008 during the foreclosure crisis as a result of the economic downturn. Thai CDC became a HUD-approved counseling agency in August 2010. Besides the one-on-one counseling services that were offered, the Housing Counseling Program use to also provide mortgage delinquency and default solution workshops and credit repair workshops to the Thai community.

==== Financial education ====
Thai CDC provides a series of financial education workshops for homeowners or first-time homebuyers. Workshop subjects include financial institutions, taxes, and salary and budgeting.

=== Micro/small business development ===
==== Asian Pacific Islander Small Business Program ====
Thai CDC co-founded the Asian Pacific Islander Small Business Program (API SBP). Formed in 1999, API SBP is a consortium of five of the longest-standing organizations in the Los Angeles Asian and Pacific Islander community that includes the Thai Community Development Center, Koreatown Youth and Community Center, Chinatown Service Center, Little Tokyo Service Center Community Development Corporation, and Search to Involve Filipino Americans. Its purpose is to assist small and largely Asian immigrant businesses in Los Angeles by offering business development services, counseling, and general technical assistance free of charge to small business owners and entrepreneurs who are interested in starting, growing, or expanding their businesses. In addition, the program helps small businesses in the areas of accessing capital and loans, business structuring, marketing, permits and licensing, taxes, accounting, and business plans.

==== Entrepreneurship Training Program ====
The Entrepreneurship Training Program (ETP) is a five-week weekend course for Thai-speakers interested in starting a US business. Thai CDC has offered the ETP since 1995. The ETP provides information on developing, opening, and operating a business. Topics covered include developing a business plan, licenses and permits, the importance of credit, business legal issues, and access to capital.

=== Social enterprises ===
==== Thai Town Marketplace ====
The Thai Town Marketplace is a public market that provides entrepreneurs with small business opportunities, creates permanent jobs, and helps low-income individuals become economically self-sufficient. Representing Thai CDC's first commercial venture, the Thai Town Marketplace, to be located at the Hollywood/Western Redline Metro Stop at the gateway to Thai Town, is designed to be a social enterprise business incubator in the East Hollywood area.

=== Neighborhood development ===
==== Thai Town development ====
In 1999, the world's first Thai Town was officially designated by the Los Angeles City Council. After a seven-year protracted campaign facilitated by Thai CDC, the Thai community won the City of Los Angeles designation of Thai Town in East Hollywood on October 27, 1999.

The goal of Thai Town is to utilize cultural tourism as a vehicle for economic development in East Hollywood. The designation of Thai Town also acknowledges the history of the Thai community and its contributions to the economy and cultural and social fiber of the city. Thai Town is a form of community empowerment because it has helped establish a Thai identity within the diversity of Los Angeles. Since the designation, Thai CDC has continued to collaborate with community stakeholders on projects aimed at achieving the goals of community beautification, cultural preservation, and neighborhood revitalization.

Thai Town is now in President Obama’s federally designated Promise Zone.

==== Asian Pacific Islander Preserve America Neighborhood Coalition ====
In 2008, Thai CDC expanded its partnership with the four Asian Pacific Islander (API) communities in Los Angeles to pursue a national designation by the White House of all five API towns as a Preserve America Neighborhood. The other API towns include Chinatown, Little Tokyo, Historic Filipinotown, and Koreatown. Together, the five communities formed the API Preserve America Neighborhood Coalition. Thai Town was officially designated a Preserve America neighborhood in 2008 by the White House. This federal initiative encourages community efforts to preserve and enjoy its national and cultural heritage.

==== Thai New Year's Day Songkran Festival ====
Co-founded by Thai CDC and occurring on the first Sunday in April and originating in 2004, the festival attracts approximately 100,000 people annually. The Songkran Festival is a day of Thai culture, food, and entertainment on the streets of Thai Town on Hollywood Boulevard between Western and Normandie Avenues. Over 200 booths sell Thai food, beverages, silk, silver, ceramics, lacquerware, jewelry, plants, flowers, pottery, and handicrafts. People can also take part in the traditional water blessing.

==== Thai Town tree planting project ====
Thai CDC worked with the former Community Redevelopment Agency of the City of Los Angeles to implement the East Hollywood Streetscape Project in 2010 to improve sidewalks, install sidewalk designs, and plant trees along Hollywood Blvd increasing the canopy by 60 percent.

==== Thai Town beautification days ====
Thai CDC works together with the Rotary Club of Thai Town in organizing monthly Thai Town clean-up events.

==== Thai Town Apsonsi Gateway Project ====
Thai CDC installed four angel statues called "apsonsis" that stand at the four corners of Thai Town as symbolic guardians of the Thai cultural and commercial corridor. The first two were installed in 2007. The last two were installed in 2012. The Thai angel statues greet locals and visitors to Thai Town from their position at the district's west and east entrances on Hollywood Boulevard. The apsonsi is a mythical half-woman, half-lion figure. In ancient Thai literature, the apsonsi is believed to be a protector and safeguard against harm. Angels were chosen for the gateway as the names of both the City of Bangkok and the City of Los Angeles mean "city of angels".

==== Thai Town Kinnara lamppost project ====
The Thai Town Friendship City Kinnara Monument Project is a project of the Thai Community Development Center and the Royal Thai Consulate General of Los Angeles. Installed in 2013, these mythical half-man, half-bird lampposts can be found in the heart of Thai Town.

==== East Hollywood Certified Farmers' Market ====
The East Hollywood Certified Farmers' Market was created by Thai CDC in 2012 to improve access to fresh affordable locally-grown fruits and vegetables and encourage healthy behavior among low-income and vulnerable populations in East Hollywood.

=== Community empowerment ===
==== Transit-oriented development ====
Thai CDC is part of the Alliance for Community-based Transit LA (ACT-LA) which seeks to rebuild LA by engaging community voices often excluded from discussions of development. Thai CDC focuses on transit-oriented developments (TODs) in East Hollywood, populated by a high proportion of foreign-born households. Thai CDC has been addressing the issue of equitable TOD since before the Metro Red Line began construction in 1999.

==== Voter education and registration ====
Thai CDC engages in voter education and registration in order to raise community consciousness about the importance of voting and civic engagement and increase voter participation.

==== CHOICE neighborhood planning initiative ====
In partnership with the Youth Policy Institute, Thai CDC engages community stakeholders in the planning process to revitalize the Hollywood neighborhood.

=== Human rights advocacy ===
==== Slavery Eradication and Rights Initiative Project (SERI) ====
Thai CDC started the Slavery Eradication and Rights Initiative, SERI ('freedom' in Thai), to raise awareness of human trafficking and modern-day slavery in the US and to gain redress and restitution to trafficked Thai victims. The first case of modern-day slavery in the US was discovered after a raid by federal and state authorities, Thai CDC, and law enforcement in El Monte, California in 1995. The case is known as the El Monte Thai Garment Slavery Case.

Since that case, the Thai CDC has worked on six more cases involving over 400 Thai victims trafficked for garment work, domestic work, sexual exploitation, welding, and agriculture. Thai CDC's services extend to members of their families, who must be resettled, culturally oriented, and shepherded through a complex web of systems to help them achieve full integration in a new country upon reunification, thereby increasing the number of victims being served by Thai CDC to over 2,000.

=== Family and children services, youth development, legal services ===
==== Hollywood Family Source Center ====
In partnership with the Youth Policy Institute, Thai CDC used to operate a Hollywood Family Source Center (HFSC), offering linguistically and culturally competent social services to low-income Thai individuals and families residing in Los Angeles. At the Hollywood Family Source Center, Thai CDC provides free income tax preparation to low-income families as part of its Volunteer Income Tax Assistance (VITA) helping low-income families receive their Earned Income Tax Credit.

==== Summer activist training ====
Founded in 1993, the Summer Activist Training Program (SAT) has provided young Asian Pacific Islander Americans an opportunity to spend three and a half days learning valuable skills in community organizing and direct-action campaigns. The Summer Activist Training Program is sponsored by seven Los Angeles-area Asian Pacific Islander community organizations and is staffed by experienced staff from the organizations, coalition partners, and SAT alumni.

==== Promise Neighborhood ====
In partnership with the Youth Policy Institute, Thai CDC provides enrichment activities for children in Hollywood under the Promise Neighborhood program to break the cycle of generational poverty and provide children with a path to success through health, social, and educational support.

==== Legal services ====
Thai CDC provides legal services in the area of immigration including citizenship, family-based petitions, and advance parole and re-entry permits.

==== California health insurance enrollment ====
Thai CDC is a certified Covered CA health insurance enrollment agency and can assist anyone eligible to enroll into the affordable health insurance plan.
