= Henry Ong =

American dramatist

- Born: November 23, 1949; Malaysia
- Died: September 29, 2018 (aged 68); Los Angeles, California, United States
- Education: Iowa State University
- Spouse: Matthew Black
- Writing career
- Years active: 1989–2018
- Notable works: Sweet Karma, Fabric, Legend of the White Snake, People Like Me, Madame Mao's Memories
- Notable awards: DramaLogue Award for Excellence in Writing, Lee Melville Award from Playwrights Arena

Henry Ong (November 23, 1949 – September 29, 2018) was an internationally produced playwright whose works have been produced at the Old Globe Theatre, San Diego, Singapore Repertory Theatre, Latchmere Theatre, London; Queens Theatre in the Park, NY, Bailiwick Theatre, Chicago, Whitefire Theatre, Los Angeles, Grove Theater Center, Los Angeles, and Company of Angels, Los Angeles. His fully produced plays include The Blade of Jealousy, Sweet Karma, Fabric, Legend of the White Snake, People Like Me, and Madame Mao's Memories. His other completed works include Ascent (expanded from a short play, "The Silkworm Scientist"), Rachel Ray, Nina Balatka, and The Masseur.

== Early life ==
Born in Malaysia in 1949, Ong attended school in Singapore before migrating to the United States to attend Iowa State University.

== Works ==
Ong was a 16-time recipient of the City of Los Angeles Department of Cultural Affairs Artist-in-Residence grants. He has worked on many oral history projects in several underserved communities—notably Asian American—resulting in presentation of stories not often portrayed in mainstream media. These include Chinese American Stories, Thai American Stories, Pinoy Stories, and Sikh American Stories, among others.

In 1998, Ong received a DramaLogue Award for Excellence in Writing for his play, People Like Me. In 2014, he was recognized with the Lee Melville award by Playwrights' Arena for Outstanding Contribution to Theater in Los Angeles. in 2018, he was awarded the Dean's Arts and Humanities Award from College of Liberal Arts and Sciences at Iowa State University, in recognition of distinguished alumni who have enhanced appreciation of the arts and humanities at the local, state, national or international level. Ong was an Active Member of the Dramatist Guild.

== Death ==
Ong died on September 29, 2018, in Los Angeles, California.

== Playwriting credits ==
=== Full-length plays ===
- Madame Mao's Memories, Theatre/Theater, Los Angeles (1989); Latchmere Theatre, London (1990); TheatreWorks, Singapore (1991); Edinburgh Festival (1993); Old Globe Theatre, San Diego (1994)
- People Like Me, Playwrights' Arena (1997)
- Fabric, Singapore Repertory Theatre (1999); Nomad Theatre, Surrey, England (2000); Company of Angeles (2010)
- Odd Birds (book of musical), Los Angeles Theatre Center (1999)
- Dream of the Red Chamber (stage adaptation), Central Library ( 2000), commissioned by Library Foundation of LA; Action Theatre, Singapore (2001). Awarded an Inglewood Growing Artists Performed Projects (IGAPP) grant for 2017; full six-hour staged adaptation presented in Edward Vincent Jr Park and Willie Agee Playhouse.
- The Legend of the White Snake, Center for the Arts, Eagle Rock (2005)
- The Old Lady Who Popped Out of the Sidewalk and Became a Christmas Tree, Theatre East (2006)
- Sweet Karma, Queens Theatre in the Park, NY (2009); Grove Theater Center (2013)
- Rachel Ray (adaptation of Anthony Trollope's 19th century novel), The Coop, Pacific Resident Theatre (workshop production) 2010
- The Call of the Nightingale, (workshop production) Company of Angels (2011)
- The Blade of Jealousy, Whitefire Theatre (2018). Inspired by Tirso de Molina's La Celosa De Sí Misma (Jealous of Herself), translated by Harley Erdman.
- Ascent, Plain Wood Productions at Skylight Theatre (2026).

=== One-acts and short plays ===
One acts:

- Letters of Wei Jingsheng Ocean Park Branch Library (1997)
- Voices of Hiroshima, Faith United Methodist Church, (1999); West. Los Angeles United Methodist Church (1997)
- The Silkworm Scientist, LA History Project, Los Angeles Theatre Center (2001)

Short plays include: Winter; The Valley of the Bones; Legit; Seppuku!; Who's F***ing the Horse?; Stella!; Leonardo Doesn't Live Here Anymore; Sunset in Silver Lake; Dim Sum and Then Some; The Birth of Narcissus; The Saga of Lulu Wong; Four Walls.

Youth plays (2001–2006):

Golden Flower Princess (Thai folktale); The Fire Boy (Japanese folktale); Lady White Snake (Chinese folktale); The Marriage of Bolak Sonday (Filipino folktale) [all produced by Marlton School, Los Angeles]

Writing/oral history workshops (facilitated and conducted):

- Pinoy Stories, Eagle Rock City Hall (2006)
- Chinese American Stories, Chinese Historical Society of So. California (2007–08)
- Korean American Stories, Korean American Youth & Community Service Center (2008/09)
- Stories of the Visually-Impaired or Deaf, Braille Institute (2009)
- Thai American Stories, Palm Village Senior Housing (2011)
- Sikh American Stories, Sikh Gurdwara of Los Angeles, (2013)
- Middle Eastern/North African Stories, The Markaz (2015)

Teaching experience

- Haque Center for Creativity and Acting, Singapore, (The Blank Page Project, 2014)
- Youth Drama Workshop, TeenScape, LA Public Library (1998)
- Writing Workshops for Youth, David Geffen Center (Jul-Aug 96), South Gate High School (1996), American Youth Foundation (1995)
- Monologue Writing, TheatreWorks, Singapore, (1992)

Published plays and books

- Madame Mao's Memories, Three Continents Press<
- People Like Me, Norman Maine Publishing
- Uncle Yankee, Yellow Chrysanthemum Press

Screenplays

China Boy, The Body Perfect, Tara

== Awards ==
- Dean's Arts and Humanities Award, College of Liberal Arts & Sciences, Iowa State University (2018)
- Lee Melville Award (Outstanding Contribution to Theater in LA) Playwrights' Arena (2014)
- Department of Cultural Affairs Artist-in-residence grants (16 time recipient)
- DramaLogue Award for Excellence in Writing – "People Like Me" (1998)
